= List of journalists killed during the Russo-Ukrainian war =

As of 16 May 2023, at least 17 civilian journalists and media workers have been killed in the line of duty since the Russo-Ukrainian War began in 2014. Six have been Russian, four Ukrainian, one Italian, one American, one Lithuanian, one Irish and three French.

An initial wave of journalist fatalities occurred in the early stages of the war in Donbas in 2014, starting with Italian journalist Andrea Rocchelli and his interpreter, Russian activist Andrei Mironov. In the following four months, four Russian journalists in the company of Russian separatist forces were killed by Ukrainian fire, as was one Ukrainian journalist in an incident that both sides in the conflict blamed on each other. Two pairs of killings led to legal proceedings: In Rocchelli and Mironov's deaths, Ukrainian National Guard member Vitalii Markiv was tried in Italy for allegedly ordering the strike. He was convicted but later exonerated. In the deaths of Russian journalists Igor Kornelyuk and Anton Voloshin by mortar strike, captured Ukrainian Army pilot Nadiya Savchenko was tried in Russia for allegedly ordering the strike. She was convicted and subsequently freed in a prisoner exchange with Ukraine. The relationship between Russian journalists and separatist forces became a subject of controversy.

A second wave of deaths began with the full-scale Russian invasion of Ukraine in 2022. Yevhenii Sakun, a Ukrainian, was the first journalist killed in that phase of the war, a victim of a Russian airstrike on the Kyiv TV Tower on 1 March 2022. Six more journalists have been killed by Russian soldiers, including four shot and one killed by shelling. The dead include American documentarian Brent Renaud, Ukrainian photojournalist Maks Levin, and most recently Lithuanian documentarian Mantas Kvedaravičius.

In addition, at least six Ukrainian journalists have been killed outside the line of duty or under ambiguous circumstances and at least seven journalists have been killed while serving in the Armed Forces of Ukraine or the Russian separatist forces in Donbas.

== Civilian journalists killed in the line of duty ==
Eighteen journalists and media workers are listed by the Committee to Protect Journalists's database as of 1 June 2022 as having been killed in the Russo-Ukrainian War—seven in the war in Donbas in 2014–2015, ten in the full-scale Russian invasion of Ukraine in 2022. As of 11 October 2024, at least 18 civilian journalists have been killed in the line of duty according to the National Union of Journalists of Ukraine.

Name and nationality	Profession	Employer	Date of death	Killed by	Cause of death
(Italy) Andrea Rocchelli	Photojournalist	Cesura	24 May 2014	Armed Forces of Ukraine	Shelling
(Russia) Andrei Mironov	Interpreter and fixer	(Freelance)	24 May 2014	Armed Forces of Ukraine	Shelling
(Russia) Igor Kornelyuk	Correspondent	VGTRK	17 June 2014	Armed Forces of Ukraine	Shelling
(Russia) Anton Voloshin	Sound engineer	VGTRK	17 June 2014	Armed Forces of Ukraine	Shelling
(Russia) Anatoly Klyan	Camera operator	Channel One	30 June 2014	Armed Forces of Ukraine	Shot
(Russia) Andrey Stenin	Photojournalist	Several news agencies	Disappeared 5 August 2014; Body found 3 September 2014	Armed Forces of Ukraine	Unclear; body found in burnt-out car
(Ukraine) Serhiy Nikolayev	Photojournalist	Segodnya	28 February 2015	Disputed: (Donetsk People's Republic) Donbas People's Militia or (Ukraine) Armed Forces of Ukraine	Shelling
(Ukraine) Yevhenii Sakun	Photojournalist and correspondent	Live; EFE	1 March 2022	(Russia) Russian Armed Forces	Airstrike
(United States) Brent Renaud	Documentarian	(Independent)	13 March 2022	(Russia) Russian Armed Forces	Shot
(Republic of Ireland) (France) Pierre Zakrzewski	Photojournalist	Fox News	14 March 2022	(Russia) Russian Armed Forces	Shelling
(Ukraine) Oleksandra Kuvshynova	Fixer	Fox News	14 March 2022	(Russia) Russian Armed Forces	Shelling
(Russia) Oksana Baulina	Correspondent	The Insider	23 March 2022	(Russia) Russian Armed Forces	Rocket strike
(Ukraine) Maks Levin	Photojournalist	LB.ua	Disappeared 13 March 2022; Body found 1 April 2022	(Russia) Russian Armed Forces	Shot
(Lithuania) Mantas Kvedaravičius	Documentarian	(Independent)	2 April 2022	(Russia) Russian Armed Forces	Shot (alleged)
(Ukraine) Roman Zhuk	Photographer	(Independent)	26 May 2022	(Russia) Russian Armed Forces	
(France) Frédéric Leclerc-Imhoff	Camera operator	BFM TV	30 May 2022	(Russia) Russian Armed Forces (alleged)	Shelling
(Ukraine) Bohdan Bitik	Producer	La Repubblica	26 April 2023	(Russia) Russian Armed Forces (alleged)	Shot by Sniper
(France) Arman Soldin	Reporter, video coordinator	Agence France-Presse	9 May 2023	(Russia) Russian Armed Forces	Rocket attack
(Ukraine) Victoria Amelina	Writer and journalist	(Independent)	1 July 2023	(Russia) Russian Armed Forces	Rocket attack
(Russia) Rostislav Zhuravlev	Journalist	RIA Novosti	22 July 2023	Armed Forces of Ukraine	Shelling; cluster bombing (alleged by Russia)
(Russia) Boris Maksudov	Journalist	Rossiya 24	23 November 2023	Armed Forces of Ukraine	Shelling; drone strike (alleged by Russia)
(Russia) Semyon Eremin	Journalist	Izvestia	19 April 2024	Armed Forces of Ukraine	Drone strike (alleged by Russia)
(Russia) Valery Kozhin	Cameraman	NTV	13 June 2024	Armed Forces of Ukraine	Shelling (alleged by Russia)
(Russia) Nikita Tsitsagi	Correspondent	NEWS.ru	15 June 2024	Armed Forces of Ukraine	Drone strike (alleged by Russia)
(United Kingdom) Ryan Evans	Safety advisor	Reuters	25 August 2024	(Russia) Russian Armed Forces	Missile strike (alleged by Ukraine)
(Russia) Alexander Martemyanov	Correspondent	Izvestia	4 January 2025	Armed Forces of Ukraine	Drone strike (alleged by Russia)
(Ukraine) Tetiana Kulyk	Correspondent	Ukrinform	26 February 2025	(Russia) Russian Armed Forces	Drone strike (alleged by Ukraine)
(Russia) Alexander Fedorchak	Correspondent	Izvestia	24 March 2025	Armed Forces of Ukraine	Airstrike (alleged by Russia)
(Russia) Andrei Panov	Cameraman	Zvezda	24 March 2025	Armed Forces of Ukraine	Airstrike (alleged by Russia)
(Russia) Alexander Sirkeli	Driver	Zvezda	24 March 2025	Armed Forces of Ukraine	Airstrike (alleged by Russia)
(Russia) Nikita Goldin	Correspondent	Zvezda	22 April 2025	Armed Forces of Ukraine	Airstrike (alleged by Russia)
(Russia) Anna Prokofieva	Correspondent	Channel One	26 March 2025	Armed Forces of Ukraine	Landmine (alleged by Russia)
(France) Antoni Lallican	Photojournalist		3 October 2025	(Russia) Russian Armed Forces	Drone strike (alleged by Ukraine)
(Russia) Ivan Zuev	Correspondent	RIA Novosti	16 October 2025	Armed Forces of Ukraine	Drone strike (alleged by Russia)
(Ukraine) Olena Hramova	Journalist	Freedom TV	23 October 2025	(Russia) Russian Armed Forces	Drone strike (alleged by Ukraine)
(Ukraine) Yevhen Karmazin	Cameraman	Freedom TV	23 October 2025	(Russia) Russian Armed Forces	Drone strike (alleged by Ukraine)

=== Andrea Rocchelli and Andrei Mironov ===
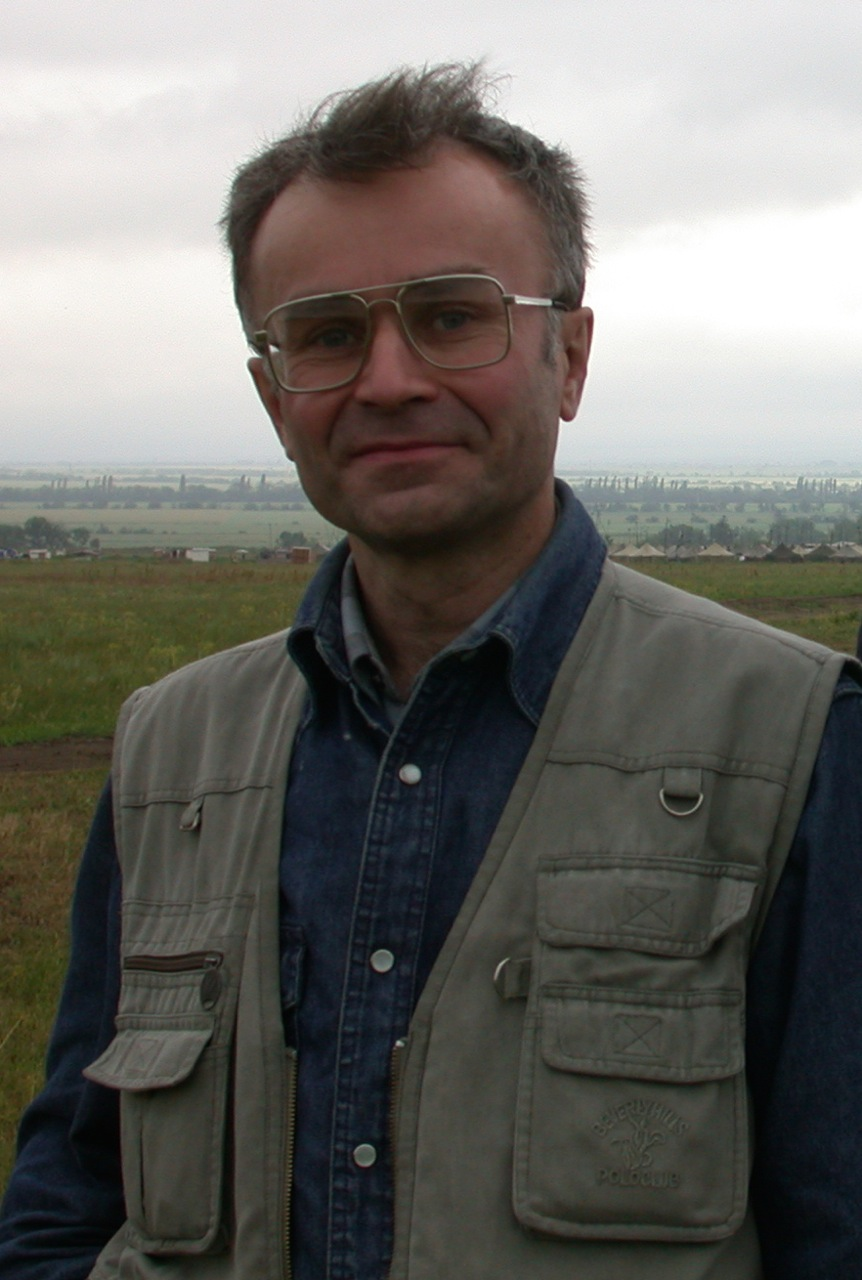
Andrei Mironov

Italian photojournalist Andrea Rocchelli and Russian journalist and activist Andrei Mironov, who was serving as Rocchelli's fixer and interpreter, were killed on 24 May 2014 near the city of Slovyansk. The two men, plus French reporter William Roguelon, and a local driver were fired at on the way to their car. Roguelon stated that they were then targeted with 40 to 60 mortars.

In July 2019, an Italian court convicted Vitalii Markiv, an Italian-Ukrainian dual citizen and an officer in the National Guard of Ukraine, of directing the strike that killed Rocchelli and Mironov. Markiv's conviction was overturned in November 2020, a decision made final by the Supreme Court of Cassation in December 2021.

=== Igor Kornelyuk and Anton Voloshin ===
Igor Kornelyuk and Anton Voloshin, correspondent and sound engineer respectively for Russian state-owned broadcasting company VGTRK, were struck by Ukrainian mortar shells on 17 June 2014 while filming a separatist roadblock in Metalist, Slovianoserbsk Raion. Voloshin died instantly, while Kornelyuk died later that day.

Both men were posthumously awarded the Russian Order of Courage by Vladimir Putin.

Nadiya Savchenko, a Ukrainian army helicopter pilot, was captured by separatists the same day and was accused of directing the mortar strike. She claimed that she had rather been captured an hour before the attack. Savchenko was convicted by a Russian court on 21 March 2016, in what Amnesty International characterized as a "flawed, deeply politicized trial". She was pardoned by Vladimir Putin as a result of a prisoner swap for two Russian soldiers two months later.

=== Anatoly Klyan ===
Anatoly Klyan, a camera operator for Russian Channel One, was killed by Ukrainian soldiers while traveling with a group of protesting soldiers' mothers on 30 June 2014 in Donetsk Oblast. The trip had been organized by separatists and the driver was wearing camouflage. Klyan continued to film the attack until he grew too weak.

=== Andrey Stenin ===
Andrey Stenin, a Russian photojournalist and correspondent for several Russian and international news agencies, disappeared on 5 August 2014 while embedded with Russian-backed forces in Donetsk. He was confirmed dead on 3 September 2014.

Stenin's body was found in a burnt-out car alongside Donetsk People's Republic militia Information Corps members Sergei Korenchenkov and Andrei Vyachalo (see § Sergei Korenchenkov and Andrei Vyachalo). Their deaths were not announced until ten days after his. The Interpreter magazine, a publication of the Institute of Modern Russia, suggested that Russia was trying to obscure the connection between Stenin and militia members. Ukrainian journalist Yuriy Butusov described Stenin as a "zampolit of Strelkov" rather than a journalist.

Stenin was posthumously awarded the Order of Courage by Vladimir Putin.

=== Serhiy Nikolayev ===
Serhiy Nikolayev, a photojournalist with the Ukrainian newspaper Segodnya, died along with soldier Mykola "Tank" Flerko during the shelling of the village of Pisky on 28 February 2015. Nikolayev was wearing a bulletproof vest marked "PRESS". Both sides in the war blamed each other.

Nikolayev had previously been attacked by the Berkut special police while reporting on the Euromaidan demonstrations in 2013. After his death he was awarded the title Hero of Ukraine by Petro Poroshenko.

=== Yevhenii Sakun ===
The strike on the Kyiv TV Tower

Yevhenii Sakun [ca], (Note: Ukrainian: Євгеній Сакун, also transliterated Evgeny Sakin) a photojournalist for Ukrainian TV channel Live and correspondent with EFE, was killed by an attack on the Kyiv TV Tower on 1 March 2022, in what Reporters Without Borders described as a "precision strike" on the facility.

=== Brent Renaud ===
Brent Renaud, a Peabody Award-winning documentary filmmaker and journalist who previously worked for The New York Times, was shot dead by Russian soldiers while at a checkpoint in Irpin on 13 March 2022. Renaud, who was known for his work depicting refugees and deportees, had been filming evacuating refugees, according to his colleague Juan Arredondo.

=== Pierre Zakrzewski and Oleksandra Kuvshynova ===
Pierre "Zak" Zakrzewski [fr], (Note: Zakrzewski (/ˈzækʃɛvskiː/ ZAK-shev-skee) was born in August 1966 in Paris to a French mother and Polish father. He was raised in Ireland.) an Irish-French photojournalist working for Fox News, and Oleksandra "Sasha" Kuvshynova [uk], (Note: Kuvshynova (Ukrainian: Олександра Кувшинова, also transliterated Kuvshinova) was 24 at the time of her death.) a Ukrainian freelancer working with Fox, were killed on 14 March 2022 when their vehicle came under fire in Horenka, Kyiv Oblast. British journalist Benjamin Hall, also of Fox, was wounded in the same attack.

Zakrzewski had worked as a freelancer for some years, but had "with mixed feelings" moved to Fox partly because it was too dangerous to work in conflict areas without the support of a media organization. He had worked for Fox in the Iraq War, War in Afghanistan, and Syrian civil war, and had received Fox's "Unsung Hero" employee award for his role in evacuating Afghan freelancers and their families after the U.S. withdrawal from Afghanistan. Shortly before his death, he had found an abandoned infant on the streets of Kyiv and brought it to a hospital.

Kuvshynova had been guiding Fox crews and assisting with newsgathering.

Killings of Oleksandra Kuvshynova and Pierre Zakrzewski were condemned by the Director-General of the UNESCO Audrey Azoulay in a press-release published on 15 March. According to global monitoring on the safety of journalists by the Observatory of Killed Journalists, their killings bring to 7 the number killed in Ukraine in 2022.

=== Oksana Baulina ===
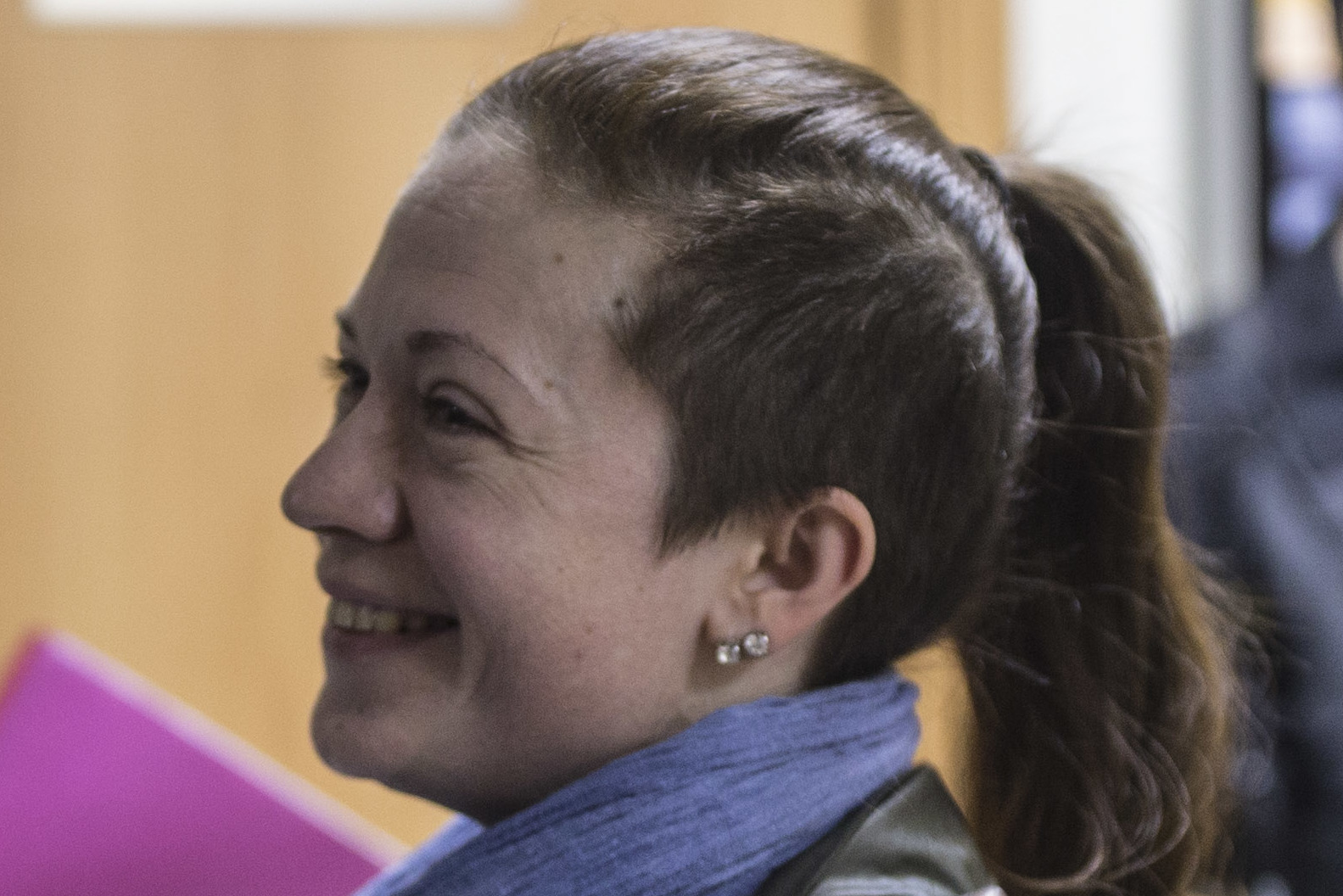
Oksana Baulina

Oksana Baulina, (Note: Oksana Viktorovna Baulina (Russian: Оксана Викторовна Баулина) was born 1 November 1979 in Krasnoyarsk Krai, Russia.) a Russian journalist for the independent investigative website The Insider, was killed in the Podilskyi District of Kyiv on 23 March 2022 by Russian shelling. She had been filming the site of a Russian rocket strike on a shopping center. Another civilian was killed in the same attack.

Baulina, once a fashion editor at Time Out Moscow, became an activist with Alexei Navalny's Anti-Corruption Foundation in 2016. She emigrated to Poland shortly before the organization was branded extremist by the Russian government. Before the invasion, she was based in Warsaw, and during the invasion had reported from Kyiv and Lviv. Her final work included interviews with Russian prisoners of war, whom she let call home using her cell phone.

=== Maks Levin ===
Maks Levin, a Ukrainian photojournalist working for the media outlet LB.ua, went missing on 13 March 2022 and was found dead near the village of Huta-Mezhyhirska in Kyiv Oblast on 1 April 2022. According to the Ukrainian Prosecutor General's Office, he was fatally shot twice by Russian soldiers while wearing a press jacket. Levin had worked with Reuters, the BBC, and the Associated Press, among other news organizations. Most of his documentary projects were related to the war in Ukraine.

Levin disappeared along with Oleksiy Chernyshov, another Ukrainian journalist, who was found dead on 1 April 2022.

A report from Reporters Without Borders concluded that the evidence they were murdered by Russian forces was overwhelming.

=== Mantas Kvedaravičius ===
Mantas Kvedaravičius, a Lithuanian documentary film director, was killed on 2 April 2022 while trying to leave the besieged city of Mariupol, the life of which he had documented for many years. According to the Russian film director Vitaly Mansky, Kvedaravičius "died with a camera in his hand". Lyudmyla Denisova, Ukraine's ombudsperson for human rights, alleged that Kvedaravičius "was taken prisoner by 'rashists', who later shot him. The occupiers threw the director's body out into the street". Kvedaravičius's widow reported that two days after his death a Russian soldier had led her to his body. She said that he had been shot in the stomach, but there was "no blood on the ground" and no bullet hole in the clothes he was wearing.

Kvedaravičius had earlier worked to document torture and forced disappearances in Russia's North Caucasus region. His 2011 documentary about war-ravaged Chechnya was awarded an Amnesty International prize.

=== Frédéric Leclerc-Imhoff ===
On 30 May 2022, French President Emmanuel Macron announced the death of French journalist Frédéric Leclerc-Imhoff, working for the media BFM TV. He was the victim of a shrapnel wound while following a humanitarian operation in Luhansk Oblast. The French Minister of Foreign Affairs, Catherine Colonna, stated that he had died as the result of a Russian action.

=== Arman Soldin ===
On 9 May 2023, Arman Soldin and his team were near Chasiv Yar, Donetsk Oblast, together with a detachment of Ukrainian soldiers. Soldin was killed by a rocket which exploded near the place he was lying, nobody else was injured. Soldin was 32. Soldin worked with Agence France-Presse since 2015, in Rome, then in London, and since 2020 again in Rome. As the Russian invasion started in February 2022, he was immediately sent to Ukraine with the Agence France-Presse team to cover the invasion. He was later rotated, against his wishes, but returned to Ukraine in September 2022, working as a video coordinator.

=== Boris Maksudov ===
Maksudov was claimed by Russia to have been targeted along with other journalists and his film crew by a combined Ukrainian artillery and drone attack in Zaporizhzhia Oblast. According to his own unreleased video shots from that day he did not wear neither "PRESS" helmet nor same vest, making him indistinguishable from regular Russian combat troops. He died of his injuries the following day.

=== Semyon Eremin ===
Eremin was reported by his employer to have been killed in a drone strike during an attack on his film crew on their way from a reporting trip to the frontline village of Pryiutne, Zaporizhzhia Oblast. He had previously covered the Siege of Mariupol and other battles in Donetsk Oblast.

=== Valery Kozhin ===
Kozhin was reported by his employer to have been killed from injuries sustained during a shelling attack on his film crew near Horlivka, Donetsk Oblast. His companion, TV journalist Alexey Ivliev, lost an arm in the attack.

=== Nikita Tsitsagi ===
Tsitsagi was reported by his employer to have been killed in a drone attack in the vicinity of a monastery near Vuhledar, Donetsk Oblast.

=== Ryan Evans ===
Evans was killed after the hotel where his team was staying in was struck in Kramatorsk, Donetsk Oblast. Two other Reuters staff were injured.

=== Alexander Martemyanov ===
Martemyanov was killed after the vehicle he was traveling in was struck near Donetsk while he was returning from an assignment in Horlivka. Five other media workers were injured.

=== Tetiana Kulyk ===
Killed along with her husband in a Russian night-time drone strike on their residence in Bucha Raion.

=== Alexander Fedorchak and Nikita Goldin ===
Izvestia said that Fedorchak was killed along with Zvezda cameraman Andrei Panov and driver Alexander Sirkeli in a strike on their car in the Kupiansk sector in Kharkiv Oblast. Nikita Goldin died later in hospital after being injured. However, the head of the Luhansk People's Republic, Leonid Pasechnik, and the Investigative Committee of Russia said that they were killed along with three civilians in Kreminna.

=== Anna Prokofieva ===
Channel One said that Prokofieva was killed after her film crew "struck an enemy mine" near the Ukrainian border in Belgorod Oblast. A cameraman, Dmitry Volkov, was also injured.

=== Antoni Lallican ===
The Ukrainian 4th Separate Mechanized Brigade said Lallican was killed in a Russian drone strike near Druzhkivka, Donetsk Oblast, that also seriously injured Ukrainian photojournalist Heorhii Ivanchenko, who is also a member of the Ukrainian Association of Professional Photographers and did freelance work for The Kyiv Independent.

=== Ivan Zuev ===
RIA Novosti said that Zuev was killed in a drone strike in Zaporizhzhia Oblast that also seriously injured another journalist, Yuri Voitkevich.

=== Olena Hramova and Yevhen Karmazin ===
Donetsk Oblast governor Vadym Filashkin said that both Hramova and Yevhen Karmazin were killed in a Lancet drone strike on their vehicle in Kramatorsk. Freedom TV also said their companion, special correspondent Oleksandr Kolychev, was injured in the attack.

== Civilian journalists killed outside the line of duty or under ambiguous circumstances ==
At least six Ukrainian journalists or media workers have been killed during the 2022 Russian invasion of Ukraine while not engaged in news-gathering or under ambiguous circumstances. As of 29 April 2022, Shakirov, Dedov, and Girich are not included in the committee to Protect Journalists's list, while Nezhyborets, Zamoysky, and Bal are listed as "motive unconfirmed".

=== Dilerbek Shakirov ===
Iryna Venediktova, Prosecutor General of Ukraine, said in a Facebook post that Dilerbek Shukurovich Shakirov, a freelance journalist for weekly newspaper Navkolo tebe (Around You) was shot dead on 26 February 2022, in Zelenivka, Kherson Oblast. A representative of the Institute of Mass Information confirmed his death; the IMI listed him separate from journalists killed in the line of duty. The BBC reported Venediktova's statement but did not independently confirm it.

Venediktova said that Shakirov was a member of the "House of Hope" charitable organization; the IMI said that he had been a part of Kherson's self-defense forces from 2014 to 2015. Venediktova said that Shakirov had been killed by Russian soldiers firing an automatic weapon from a car.

=== Roman Nezhyborets ===
The committee to Protect Journalists reported on 13 April 2022 that Roman Nezhyborets, a video technician at Dytynets, had been found dead in Yahidne. The director of Dytnets, Tatyana Zdor, said that Russian soldiers had confined Nezhyborets and the other residents of the village to underground shelters and confiscated their cell phones. Zdor said that Nezhyborets had used a hidden cell phone to contact his mother, whom he asked to hide evidence that he worked for Dytnets. According to Zdor, on 5 March, Nezhyborets was caught on the phone with his mother; his family thinks he was killed between then and 9 March.

=== Viktor Dedov ===
The National Union of Journalists of Ukraine reported on 23 March 2022, that Viktor Dedov [ca], a camera operator with Sigma, had been killed on 11 March when his apartment building in Mariupol was shelled, which his wife, Natalya Dedova, had announced on Facebook on 20 March. The shelling also wounded Dedova and other family members. A subsequent shelling set fire to the building and prevented the family from burying the body.

=== Zoreslav Zamoysky ===
The Irpin City Council reported on 12 April 2022 that Zoreslav Zamoysky, a freelance journalist and activist, had been found dead in the street in Bucha. The National Union of Journalists of Ukraine reported the same the next day. His last post online was on 4 March.

=== Yevhenii Bal ===
Yevhenii Bal, a 78-year-old journalist and fiction writer, was taken from his home in Melekine, Mariupol Raion, by Russian soldiers on 18 March, after they found a picture of him with Ukrainian marines. Russian soldiers then tortured him for three days before releasing him, saying "We are not at war with veterans of the Soviet Navy". He died of his wounds on 2 April.

=== Vira Hyrych ===
Radio Free Europe/Radio Liberty journalist and producer Vira Hyrych (Note: Ukrainian: Віра Гирич, also transliterated Gyrych and Hyrych) died as a result of a Russian missile hitting the house where she lived in Kyiv, according to her employer. Radio Liberty reported that the missile attack took place on 28 April, but her body was found under the wreckage on the morning of 29 April.

=== Victoria Roshchyna ===
Victoria Roshchyna, a journalist who covered the war for multiple media outlets, was reported have died under unexplained circumstances on 19 September 2024 while imprisoned in Russia. She went missing while reporting in Russia-occupied territory in August 2023, with the Russian defence ministry confirming her capture in 2024. Roshchyna's body was returned to Ukraine in February 2025, showing signs of torture and strangulation. The brain, both eyeballs, and trachea were missing from the body.

== Journalists killed while serving in the military ==
At least six Ukrainians, one Russian and two separatists have been killed while serving as military journalists or while serving as soldiers independent of their work as journalists. They are not included in the committee to Protect Journalists's list.

=== Sergei Korenchenkov and Andrei Vyachalo ===
Sergei Korenchenkov and Andrei Vyachalo, correspondents with the Donetsk People's Republic militia's Information Corps, disappeared alongside Andrey Stenin on 5 August 2014 (see § Andrey Stenin). Ten days after Stenin's body was found, pro-Russian newspaper Golos Sevastopolya reported the remains of both Korenchenkov and Vyachalo's had been found at the same time as his body. The two were among the first on the scene after militia forces shot down Malaysia Airlines Flight 17, and The Interpreter magazine speculated they may have known which rebels shot down the airliner.

=== Oleh Zadoyanchuk ===
Oleh Zadoyanchuk, (Note: Ukrainian: Задоянчук Олег Іванович) a soldier in the 12th Territorial Defence Battalion and journalist with state news agency Ukrinform, was killed by Russian artillery shelling on 4 September 2014.

=== Dmytro Labutkin ===
Dmytro Labutkin, (Note: Ukrainian: Дмитро Лабуткін) a military journalist with the Sevastopol TV channel Breeze prior to Russia's annexation of Crimea, died on 16 February 2015 during the Battle of Debaltseve.

=== Viktor Dudar ===
Viktor Dudar, (Note: Ukrainian: Віктор Дудар) the defense correspondent for the Lviv-based newspaper Expres and a volunteer paratrooper, was fatally shot by Russian soldiers while fighting in Mykolaiv. His death was announced on 7 March 2022. He was not working as a journalist at the time; he had re-enlisted in the military on 24 February, having previously served in Donbas from 2014 to 2015. He was among the first Ukrainian soldiers killed in the invasion.

=== Oleg Yakunin ===
On 25 March, the Ukrainian Institute of Mass Information reported the death in battle on 18 March of Oleg Yakunin, (Note: Oleg Ivanovich Yakunin (Ukrainian: Олег Іванович Якунін, first name also transliterated Oleh)) founder and editor-in-chief of several Ukrainian news sites, based on a Facebook post from his wife.

=== Yury Oleynik ===
On 26 March 2022, Channel 24 reported that one of its camera operators, Yury Oleynik, (Note: Ukrainian: Юрій Олійник) was killed on 23 March fighting in Luhansk.

=== Oleksandr Makhov ===
Oleksandr Makhov from Luhansk worked last for Telekanal Dom and prior at Ukraine, as well Channel 24. Makhov was war correspondent from the Donbas war in 2014 and reported as first Ukrainian from the Vernadsky Research Base in the Antarctica. He went in late February 2022 with beginning of the Russian invasion of Ukraine, as serviceman to the Armed Forces of Ukraine and died on 4 May 2022 in combat in Izium. Makhov became famous, after proposing to his girlfriend from the front in Odesa and the video went viral, some Newspapers and news channel (include Euronews) reported about the marriage proposal.

=== Vitaly Derekh ===
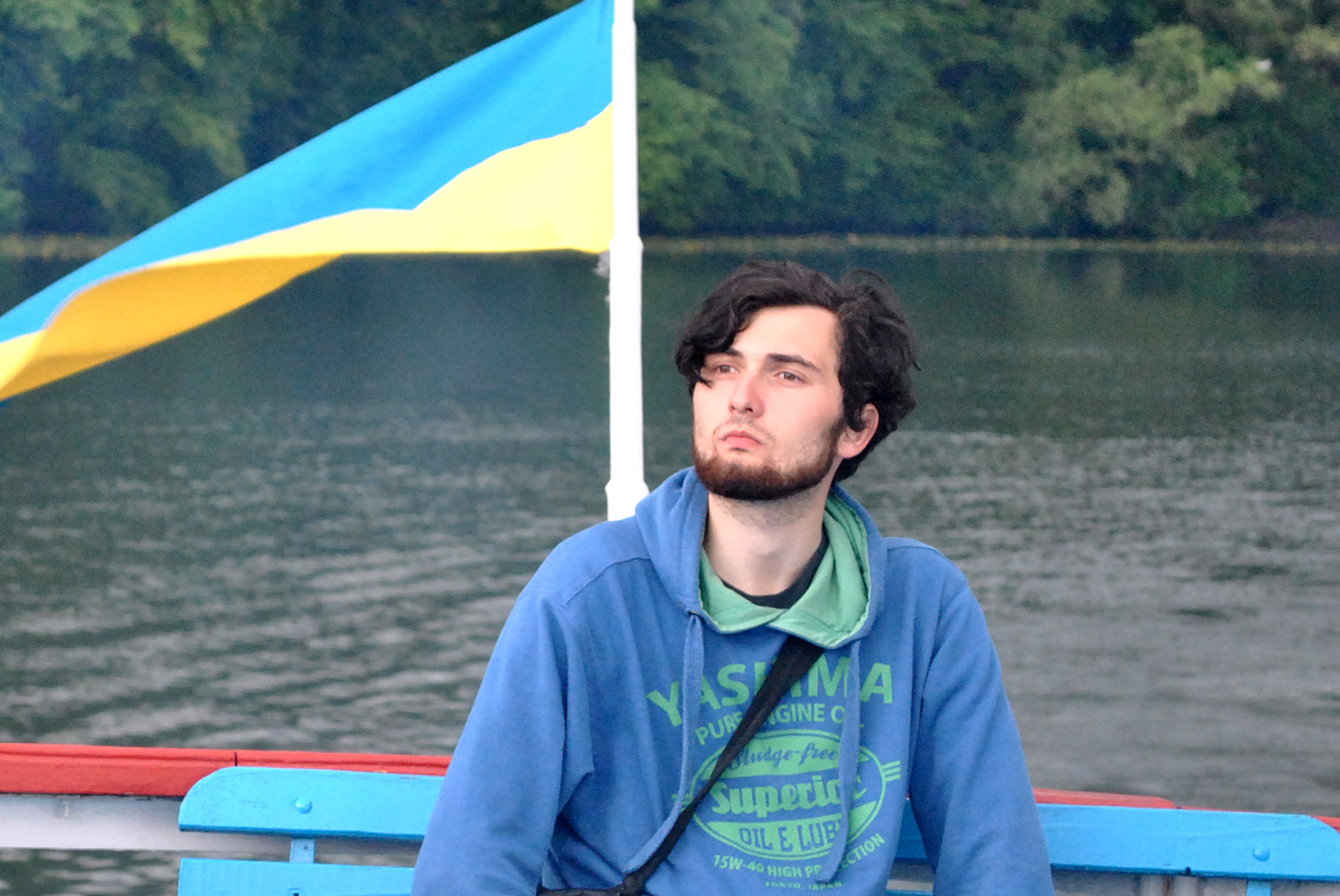
Vitaly Derekh

On 24 February 2022, Vitaly Derekh joined the military again during Russia's invasion of Ukraine. He took part in the combat in March in the Luhansk Oblast operation as well as in the area around Kyiv. He oversaw the destruction of several Russian tanks and other vehicles while leading an anti-tank division. At the age of 34, he was killed in combat on 28 May during the Battle of Bakhmut by an air strike near Popasna.

=== Sergey Postnov ===
On 15 June 2022, Russian media reported that Russian military journalist Colonel Sergey Postnov had died during Russia's "special military operation" in Ukraine.

=== Oleksandr Bondarenko ===
Oleksandr Bondarenko was a Luhansk-born Ukrainian journalist. He worked for BBC News Ukrainian from 2007 to 2011 as a news reporter, presenter and editor of radio programs. He then became a TV reporter, covering the Euromaidan protests and the Russian annexation of Crimea. At the beginning of the war, he worked at Ukrainian communications agency RMA as a communications expert and media trainer. He volunteered in the Territorial Defense Forces in February 2022 and was killed in action in April 2023.

=== Petro Tsurukin ===
Petro Tsurukin was a Ukrainian journalist from Truskavets who was formerly editor-in-chief of the One for All project on STB TV and host of the KYIV LIVE TV channel. He went missing while in military service and was confirmed by the Verkhovna Rada to have been killed in action after six months, with his date of death being listed as 4 June 2023.

=== Volodymyr Myroniuk ===
Volodymyr Myroniuk was an independent Ukrainian-American photographer who previously worked as a truck driver in the United States before going to Ukraine to cover the Revolution of Dignity in 2014. During the war, he joined the military and was also known by his call sign John. His death was announced in September 2023 by Yurii Butusov, editor-in-chief of the media outlet Censor.net.

=== Evgeny Polovodov ===
Press officer of the Russian Ministry of Defence within Zapad (West) Group of Forces, Major Evgeny Polovodov, also known with his callsign Buryj (Бурый), died on 10 April 2024 near Kreminna, Luhansk Oblast, Ukraine, in an artillery strike on a Vesti Lugansk TV crew. He was posthumously awarded with the Medal of the Order of Courage.

=== Alla Pushkarchuk ===
Alla Pushkarchuk was a Ukrainian journalist who worked for the publications the Weekly and Chytomo. She also joined the military in 2014 and was also known by her call sign Ruta. Her death was announced on 26 April 2024 by Dmytro Krapyvenko, editor-in-chief of the Weekly, adding that she died in Donetsk Oblast.

=== Oleksandr Mashlay ===
Oleksandr Mashlay was a Ukrainian journalist who was formerly the editor-in-chief of the Pravyi Postup outlet. He was reported killed in action in the Avdiivka sector on 8 May 2024 by the Verkhovna Rada Committee on Freedom of Speech.

=== Artur Shybalov ===
Artur Shybalov was a Ukrainian journalist who formerly worked as a cameraman and editor at the PTV UA channel. He was reported by his mother to have been killed in action in Kursk Oblast on 13 March 2025.

=== Kostiantyn Huzenko ===
Kostiantyn Huzenko was a Ukrainian photojournalist who formerly worked as a media producer and podcaster at Ukrainer before enlisting in the 35th Marine Brigade, where he served as a photographer and press officer in the unit's communications department. He was killed in a Russian strike in eastern Ukraine on 1 November 2025.

== See also ==
- List of Ukrainian sports figures killed during the Russo-Ukrainian war
