= Horenka =

Horenka or Gorenka (Ukrainian: Горенка, Russian: Горенка) may refer to:

- Horenka, Bucha Raion, Kyiv Oblast, a village in Ukraine
- Horenka (river), a tributary of the Irpin
