= Manhush Raion =

Former subdivision of Donetsk Oblast, Ukraine

Manhush Raion Мангушський район
- Raion
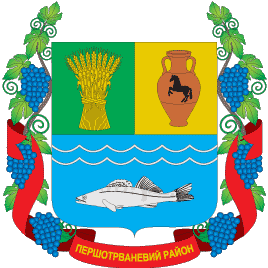
- Flag Coat of arms

- Coordinates: 47°3′30.7908″N 37°18′30.2934″E
- Country: Ukraine
- Region: Donetsk Oblast
- Disestablished: 18 July 2020
- Admin. center: Manhush
- Subdivisions: List: — city councils; 2 — settlement councils; 16 — rural councils; Number of localities: — cities; 2 — urban-type settlements; 16 — villages; 8 — rural settlements

Government
  - Governor: Borys Trima

Area
  - Total: 792 km^{2} (306 sq mi)

Population (2020)
  - Total: 25,524 ▼
  - Density: 32.2/km^{2} (83.5/sq mi)
- Time zone: UTC+02:00 (EET)
  - Summer (DST): UTC+03:00 (EEST)
- Postal index: 87400-87455
- Area code: +380 6297

Manhush Raion (Ukrainian: Мангушський район), until May 2016 Pershotravnevyi Raion (Ukrainian: Першотравневий район), was one of the raions of Donetsk Oblast, located in southeastern Ukraine. The administrative center of the raion was the urban-type settlement of Manhush (until 1995 Pershotravnevyi). The raion was abolished on 18 July 2020 as part of the administrative reform of Ukraine, which reduced the number of raions of Donetsk Oblast to eight, of which only five were controlled by the government. The area of the former Manhush Raion was merged into the newly created Mariupol Raion. The last estimate of the raion population was 25,524 (2020 est.).

The militia of the Donetsk People's Republic occupied the region for a short time but was expelled by the Donbas Battalion, a paramilitary group which consists of locals from the Donbas region.

On 19 May 2016, Verkhovna Rada adopted a decision to rename Pershotravnevyi Raion to Manhush Raion according to the law prohibiting names of Communist origin.

== Demographics ==
According to the 2001 Ukrainian Census:

Ethnicity		
Ukrainians	14,735	50.3%
Russians	7,881	26.9%
Greeks	5,882	20.1%
Belarusians	208	0.7%
