= Material Evidence =

Material Evidence (Russian: Вещдоки) is an international exhibition first presented in Russia in 2013 by Vladislav Shurigin and Denis Tukmakov with direct financial support from Zhurnalistskaya Pravda (Journalistic Truth), a Moscow-based newspaper, indirectly financed by Internet Research Agency. Both Shurigin and Tukmakov are authors of for far right magazine Zavtra, members of the National Bolshevik Party and nationalist Izborsk Club. The exhibition displays a strongly anti-Western and pro-Russian view on civil conflicts in Syria, Ukraine, Iraq and Afghanistan. It is advertised as an "evidence of USA aggression" and the section on Ukraine describes the events of surrounding Euromaidan as an "upsurge of nationalist-banderite groups" and the War in Donbas as "opposition against banderites and Western Oligarchs".

== Layout ==
Photo exhibition is based on the material submitted by war correspondents illustrating countries where civil conflicts take place, including Andrey Stenin who died near Donetsk. The exhibition's original curator in Europe, Benjamin Hiller, is a German freelance photographer and journalist who works mainly on conflict photography in hotspots such as Syria and Ukraine.

== Locations ==
The exhibition was held in a number of Russian, European, and American cities including Moscow, Ufa, Grozny, Brussels, Berlin, New York City. It is planned to hold the exhibition in Los Angeles and Washington, as well as Canada.

== Reactions ==
According to organizers, over 50 thousand people have visited the galleries.

While it was on display in New York City the exhibition was attacked and vandalized by group of people who Hiller claimed were neo-Nazis upset with Hiller's negative representation of Ukraine. As a result, some pictures had been defaced with black paint.

== Funding and controversies ==
The exhibit has become controversial due to its ties to Russian extremist newspaper Zavtra and its connection to a widespread Russian propaganda content farm network. In an article by Gawker, according to the assistant curator of the New York exhibit "in Berlin, a "silent guy" visited, told the organizers he liked what he saw, then left. Later, he came back with a bag of cash and dropped it for them with no explanation." Russian state-sponsored company Internet Research Agency is among the main sponsors of the exhibition.

The organizers are also offering financial grants of 10-20,000 euro for journalists.

== See also ==
- Media portrayal of the Russo-Ukrainian War
- Internet Research Agency
- Andrey Stenin
- Syrian Civil War
- War correspondent
