= Manhush, Donetsk Oblast =

Urban locality in Donetsk Oblast, Ukraine

Manhush Мангуш
- Rural settlement
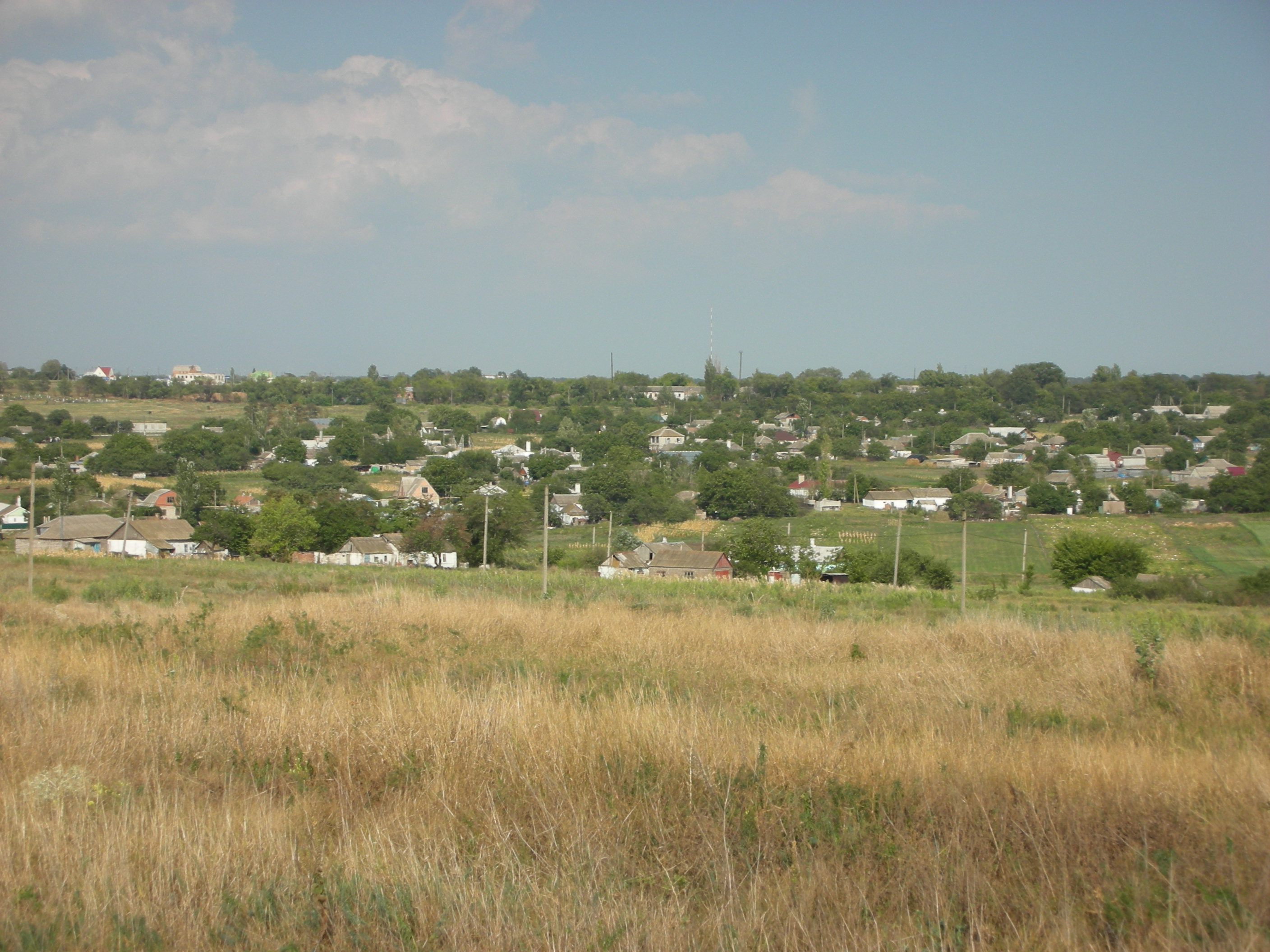
- Skyline of Manhush

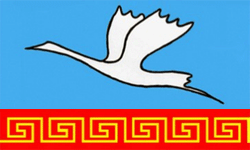
- Flag Coat of arms

- Location within Ukraine Location within Donetsk Oblast
- Country: Ukraine
- Oblast: Donetsk Oblast
- Raion: Mariupol Raion
- Hromada: Manhush settlement hromada
- Foundation: 1778

Government
  - Head of settlement council: Oleksandr Kotendzhy

Area
  - Total: 9,291 km^{2} (3,587 sq mi)
- Elevation: 56 m (184 ft)

Population (2022)
  - Total: 7,731
  - Density: 0.8321/km^{2} (2.155/sq mi)
- Postal code: 87400—87405
- Area code: +380 6297

Manhush (Ukrainian: Мангуш) is a rural settlement in Donetsk Oblast, eastern Ukraine. It was the administrative seat of Manhush Raion, but is now administered under Mariupol Raion. The population is 7,731 (2022 estimate).

The town has been under Russian occupation since March 2022.

== History ==
The settlement was founded by around 800 Crimean Greeks (out of Mangup) who were deported by Alexander Suvorov's troops. It was a village in Mariupol uezd of Yekaterinoslav Governorate of the Russian Empire. In 1946 to 1995 it was known as Pershotravneve or Pershotravnevyi. In January 1989 the population of the settlement was 7467 people.

In April 2022, during the Russian invasion of Ukraine, the town was reported to have been the site of a mass grave consisting of three hundred pits, each measuring six feet by ten feet. The mass graves are believed to contain civilian corpses taken from the siege of nearby Mariupol.

== See also ==
- Urums, Turkophone Greeks
- Greeks in Ukraine
- Treaty of Küçük Kaynarca (Metropolitanate of Gothia and Annexation of Crimea by the Russian Empire)

== Gallery ==
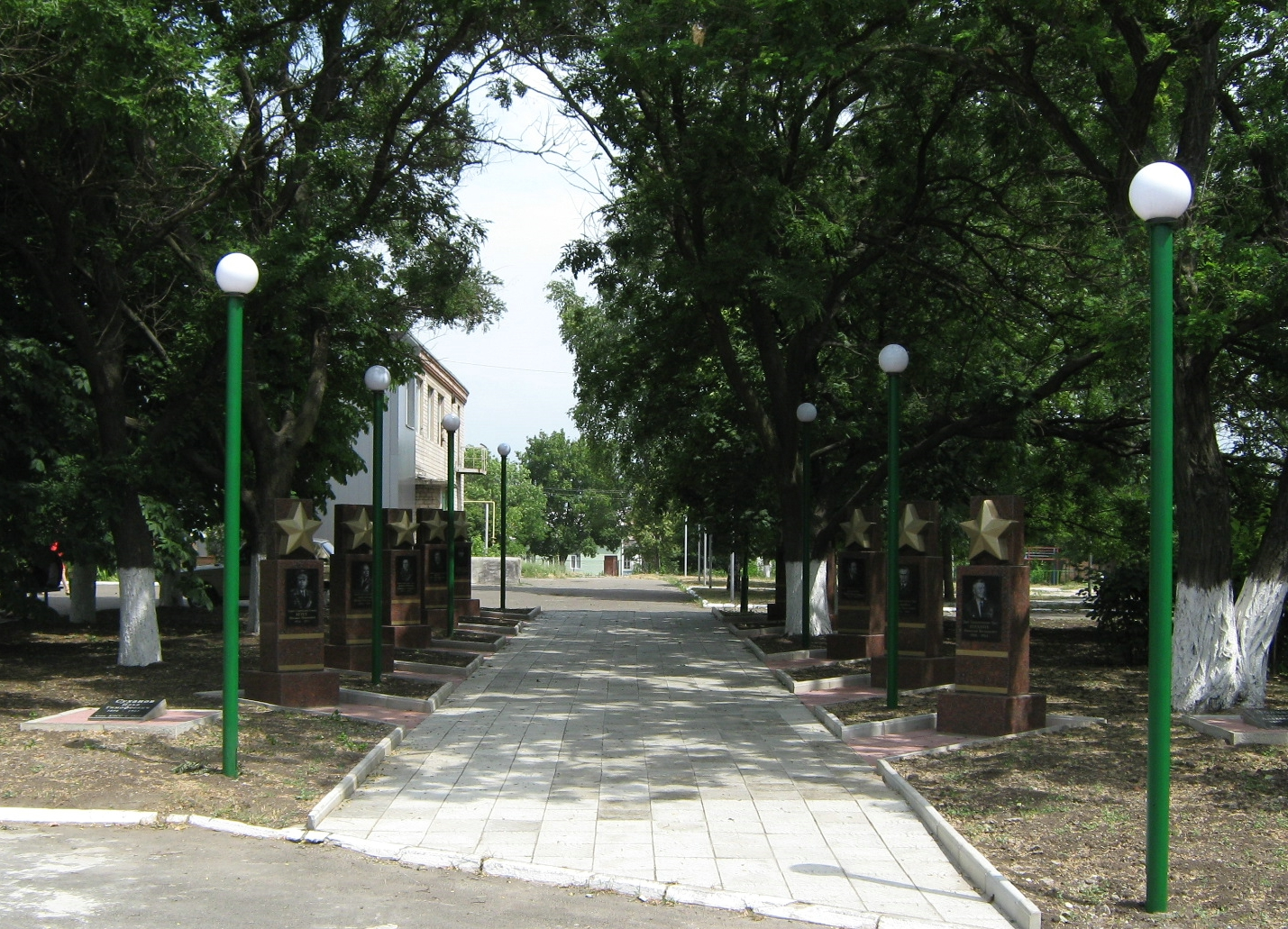
Alley of Glory in Manhush

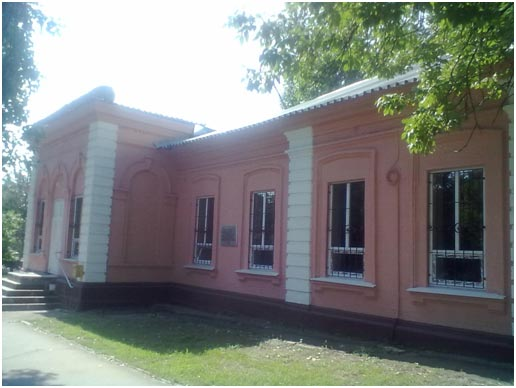
Historical building

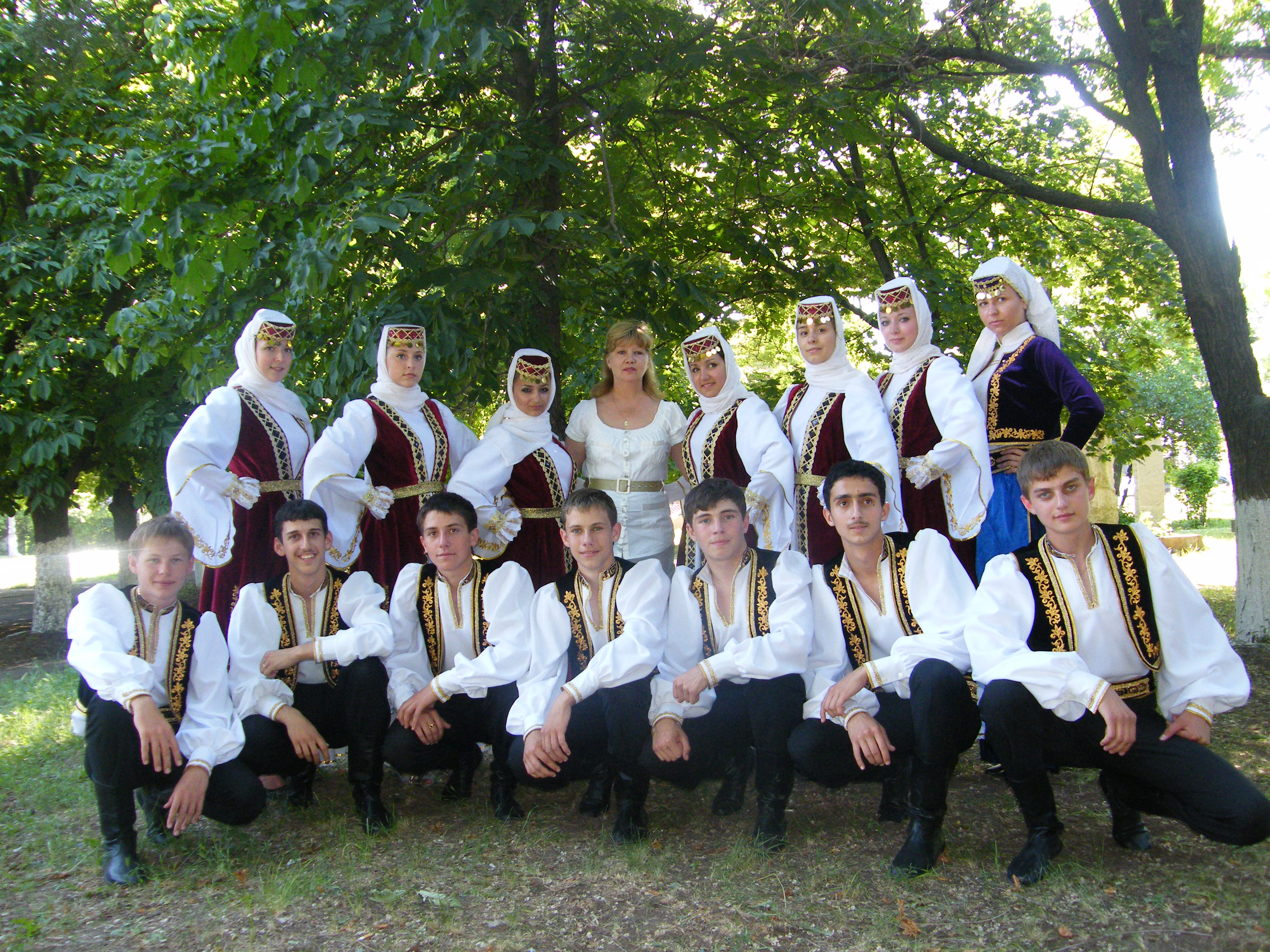
"White Bird" folk dance theatre in Manhush
