= Yuriivka, Mariupol Raion, Donetsk Oblast =

Yuriivka Юріївка
- Village
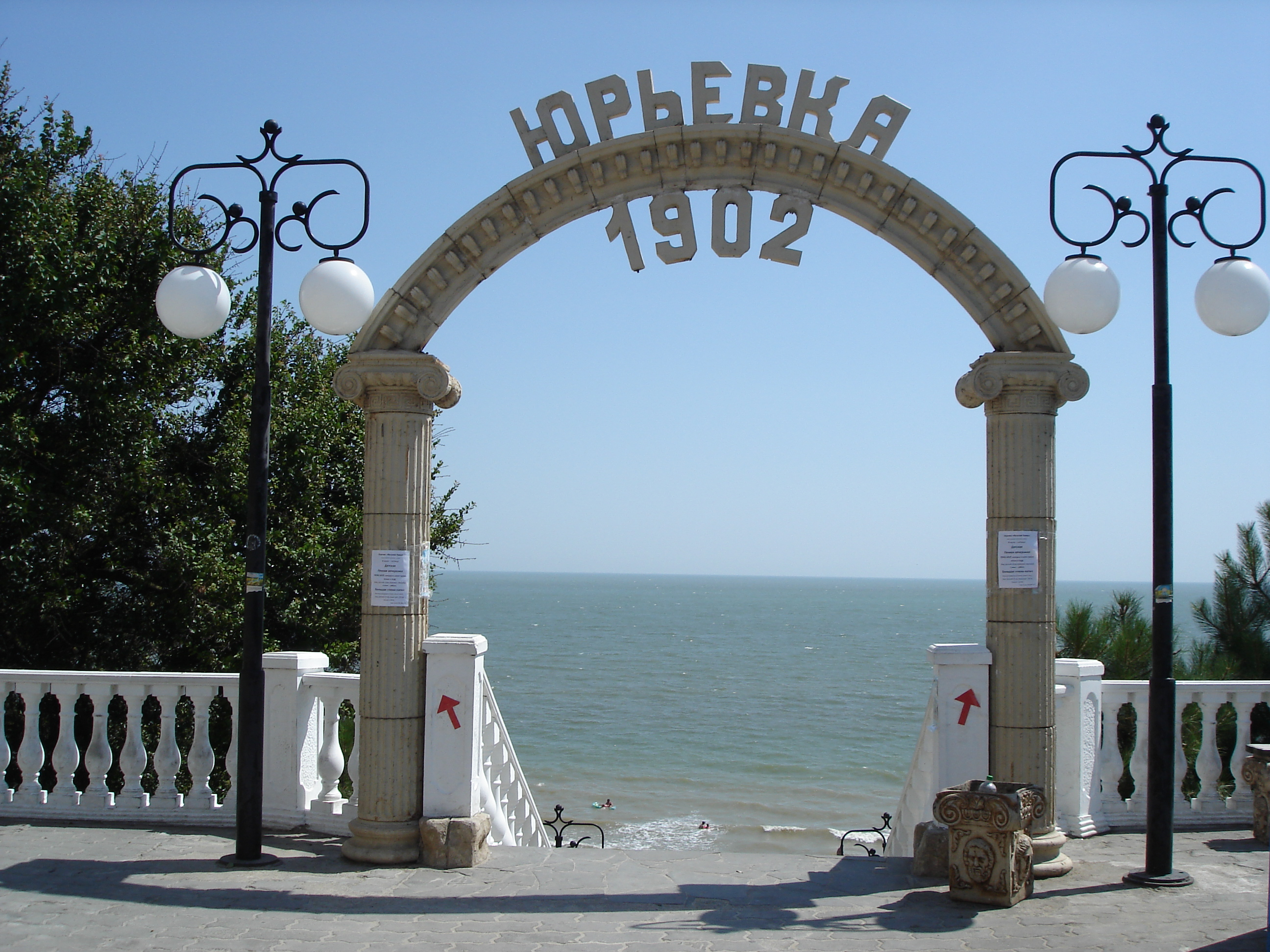
- Interactive map of Yuriivka
- Location of Yuriivka Yuriivka (Ukraine)
- Coordinates: 46°56′10″N 37°11′50″E
- Country: Ukraine
- Oblast: Donetsk Oblast
- Raion: Mariupol Raion
- Hromada: Manhush settlement hromada
- Founded: 1902
- Elevation: 18 m (59 ft)

Population (2001)
  - Total: 296
- Time zone: UTC+2 (EET)
  - Summer (DST): UTC+3 (EEST)
- Postal code: 87454
- Area code: +380 6297

Yuriivka (Ukrainian: Юріївка; Russian: Юрьевка, romanized: Yuryevka), formerly Yurivka (Юр'ївка), is a village in eastern Ukraine, along the coast of the Sea of Azov. Administratively, the village is within Manhush settlement hromada, Mariupol Raion, in Donetsk Oblast.

== History ==
During the German-Soviet War, the village came under occupation of German forces. In September 1943, the Soviet Black Sea Fleet, led by Konstantin Olshansky, launched an amphibious assault and attacked German logistics here, which helped liberate the nearby city of Mariupol soon later in the Soviets' Donbas Offensive.

During peacetime, before the Russo-Ukrainian War began, the village was most famous for having a large collection of seashells contained in several artworks.

In February 2022, with the Russian invasion of Ukraine, the village soon fell under Russian control during the Southern Ukraine campaign.

On August 14, 2023, the Ukrainian military struck a Russian command post stationed in the village.

On 18 June 2025, the Verkhovna Rada renamed the village to Yuriivka to match Ukrainian language standards.

== Geography ==
The village sits along the Sea of Azov, and has an average elevation of 18 metres (59 ft)

== Demographics ==
According to the 2001 Ukrainian Census, the population of Yurivka stood at 296. The native language distribution was 33.1% Ukrainian, 66.6% Russian, and 0.3% Greek (including Mariupol Greek and Urum).
