= Manhush settlement hromada =

Manhush settlement hromada Мангушська селищна громада
- Hromada
- Interactive map of Manhush settlement hromada
- Country: Ukraine
- Oblast: Donetsk
- Raion: Mariupol

Area
  - Total: 637.8 km^{2} (246.3 sq mi)

Population (2020)
  - Total: 21,307
  - Density: 33.41/km^{2} (86.52/sq mi)
- Settlements: 17
- Villages: 15
- Towns: 2

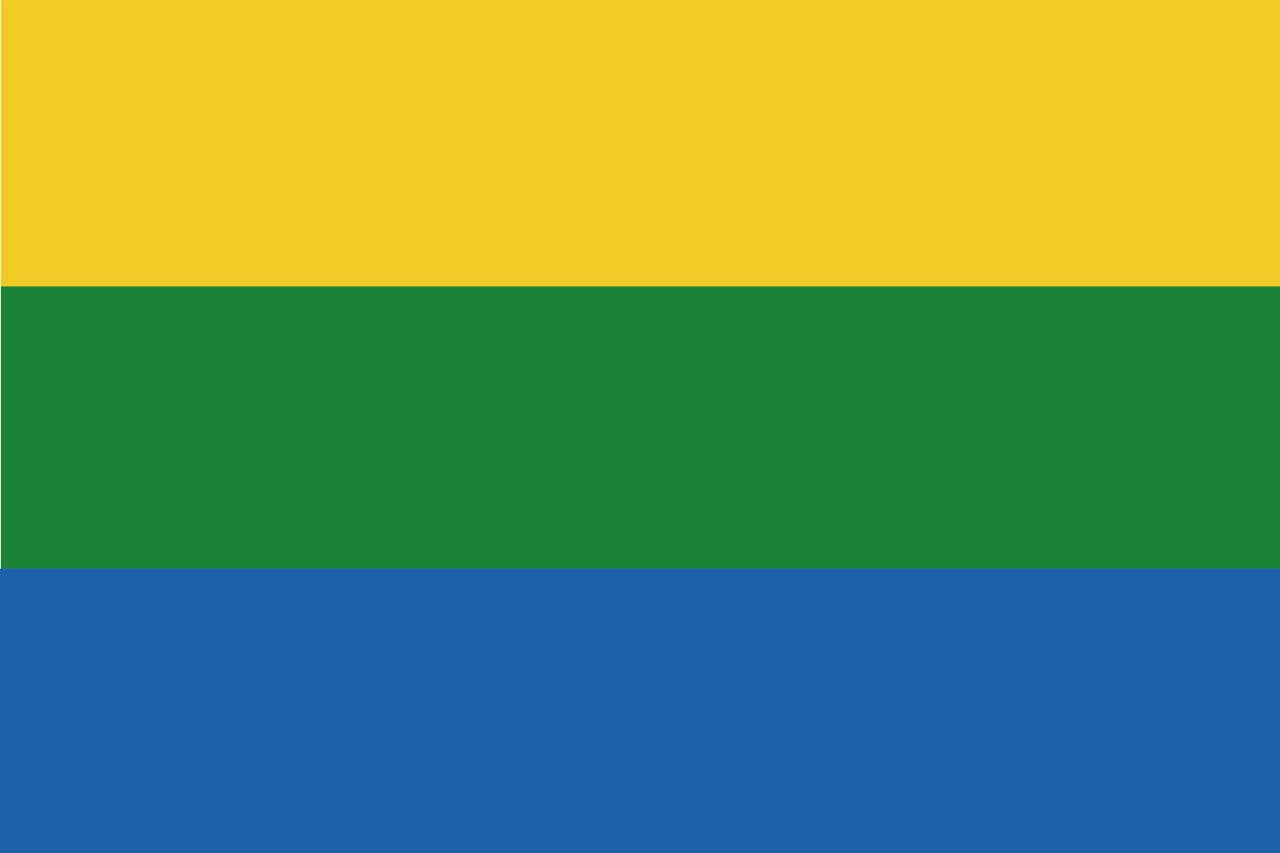
Flag of the Manhush rural territorial community

Manhush settlement hromada (Ukrainian: Мангушська селищна громада) is a hromada of Ukraine, located in Mariupol Raion, Donetsk Oblast. Its administrative center is the town of Manhush.

It has an area of 637.8 square kilometres (246.3 mi^{2}) and a population of 21,307, as of 2020.

The hromada includes 17 settlements: 2 rural settlements (Manhush and Yalta) and 15 villages:

- Azovske
- Babakh-Tarama
- Bilosaraiska Kosa
- Buriakova Balka
- Hlyboke
- Demianivka
- Zakharivka
- Komyshuvate
- Melekine
- Ohorodne
- Portivske
- Starodubivka
- Ukrainka
- Urzuf
- Yuriivka

== See also ==
- List of hromadas of Ukraine
