= Yahidne, Chernihiv Oblast =

Yahidne Ягідне
- Village
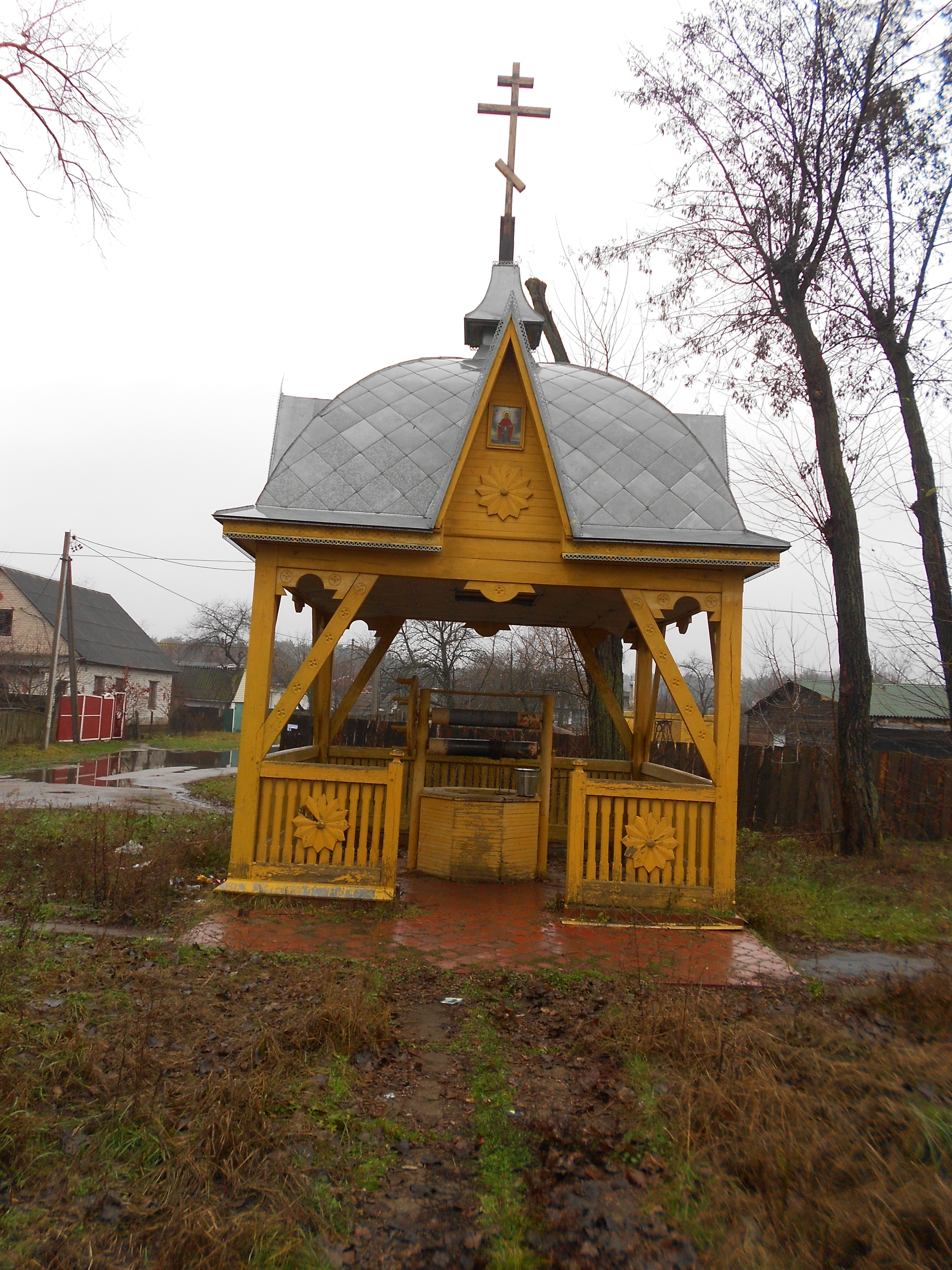
- Well in Yahidne

- Location within Chernihiv Oblast Location within Ukraine
- Coordinates: 51.3462°N 31.2771°E
- Country: Ukraine
- Oblast: Chernihiv Oblast
- Raion: Chernihiv Raion

Population (2001)
  - Total: 318
- Postal code: 15562

Yahidne (Ukrainian: Ягідне, pronounced [ˈjɑɦidne]) is a Ukrainian village in Chernihiv Raion, around 140 km north east of Kyiv and around 15 km south of Chernihiv. The population was 318 people as of the 2001 census. It was occupied by Russian forces during the 2022 Russian invasion of Ukraine.

== History ==
During the Russian invasion of Ukraine in 2022, the village was occupied by Russian forces who looted and destroyed much of it.

Inhabitants reported how during the Russian occupation of the village, soldiers forced more than 300 residents, of whom approximately sixty were children, into the basement of a school at gunpoint, where they were held against their will from 5 March to 1 April that year.

Seven villagers were reportedly executed by Russian soldiers and ten people died due to the poor conditions in the basement. Reuters and al Jazeera have stated that, in total, at least twenty people have been killed or died; however, no official death toll has been published. The journalist Roman Nezhyborets was among those who were executed by Russian soldiers.

In the beginning of April 2022, Russian forces withdrew from the village as part of the coordinated regional withdrawal from northern Ukraine.

In November 2024, German Foreign Minister Annalena Baerbock visited the school basement and commented on the inhumanity of the Russian occupation.

A study, published in 2026, showed how the use of archaeological method can be helpful even with regard to contemporary events. A joint Polish Ukrainian team used photography, satellite imagery, CAD reconstruction and photogrammetry to establish and preserve the crime scene because the building suffers from structural damage and needs to be renovated.

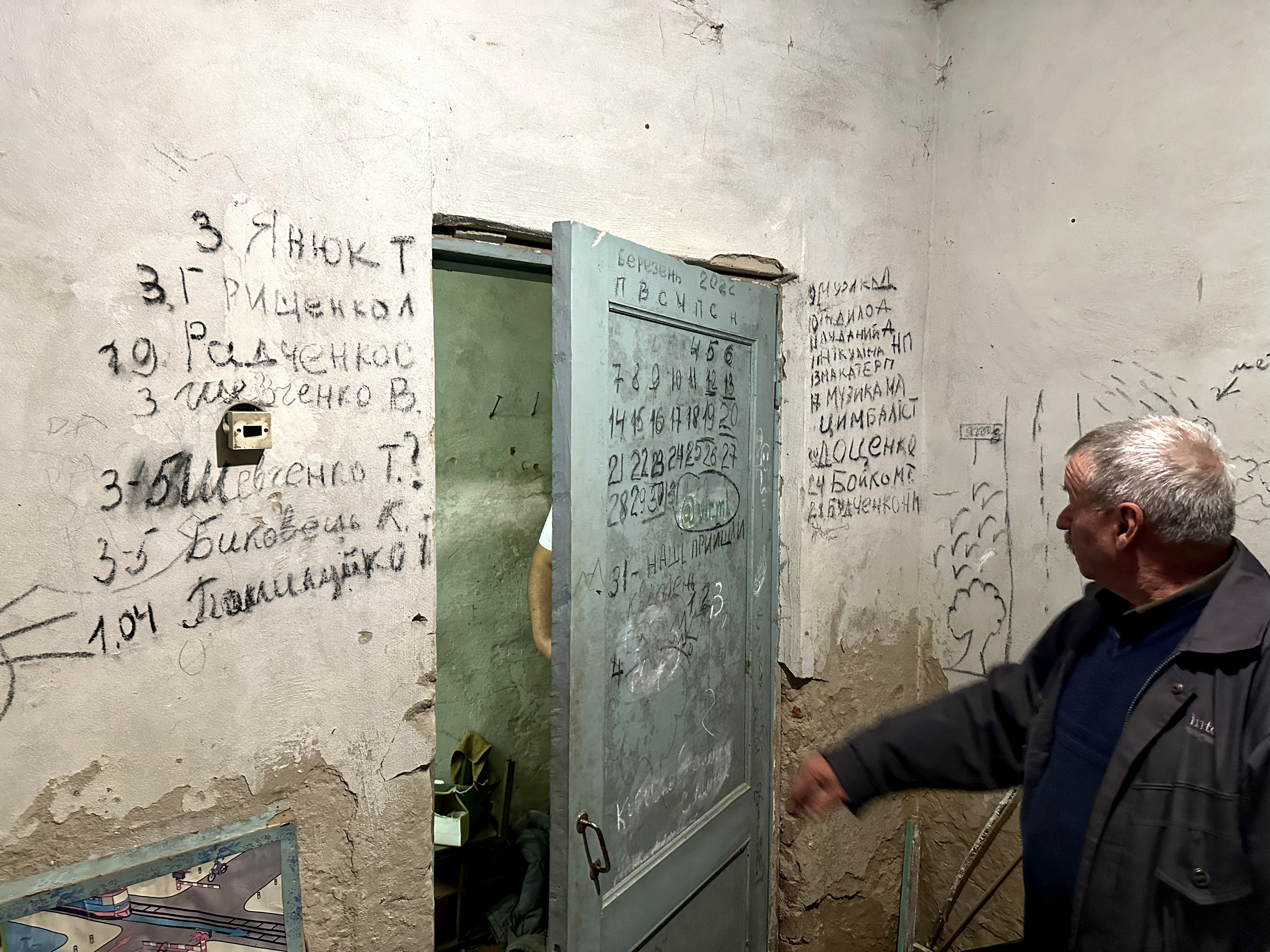
The school basement where the villagers were held. Lists of deceased and killed people, maintained by the captives, are seen on the wall.
