= Benjamin Hall (journalist) =

British journalist (born 1982)

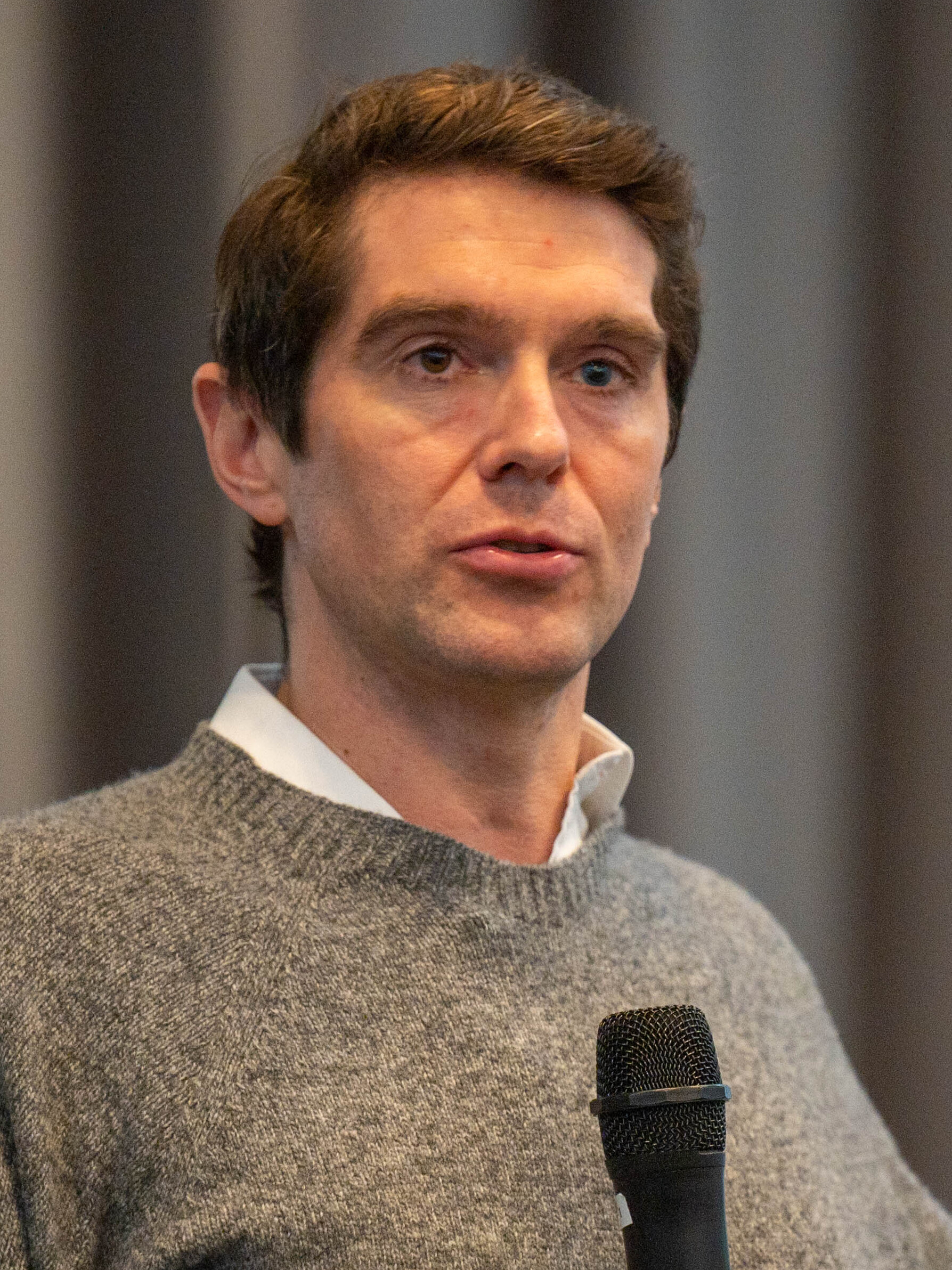
- Hall in 2024
- Born: 23 July 1982 (age 43); London, England
- Citizenship: United Kingdom; United States
- Occupation: Journalist
- Employer: Fox News
- Website: Official website

Benjamin Hall (born 23 July 1982) is a British-American journalist who serves as a State Department correspondent for Fox News Channel. He has worked for The New York Times, BBC Radio, and Esquire Magazine.

== Early life ==
Hall grew up in London, as a dual citizen, holding both US and UK passports. He studied at Ampleforth College, City of London School, and Duke University, and received a BA from Richmond University, London.

== Career ==
Hall began his career as a journalist focusing on the Middle East. Since 2007, he has written from the front lines for The New York Times, The Times of London, The Sunday Times, The Independent, the BBC, and other outlets, often as one of the first journalists on the ground.

=== War correspondence ===
Hall has traveled to Syria and Iraq, repeatedly filing dispatches for BBC Radio and Agence France Presse, as well as the aforementioned publications – often from behind enemy lines and embedded with rebel and regime troops.

Hall smuggled himself into Misrata, Libya during the height of the siege, and reported for Esquire Magazine, Channel 4 News, and others regarding Muammar Qaddafi's indiscriminate shelling of the local population. In 2014, he embedded with UN troops during the siege of the Mogadishu parliament, writing for The Times. He has reported from Egypt, Haiti, and Iran. He was a jury member of the London Kurdish film festival.

=== 2022 Ukraine attack ===
On 14 March 2022, he was injured while on assignment reporting the 2022 Russian invasion of Ukraine in Ukraine outside of Kyiv. The vehicle Hall was traveling in was attacked; Hall was wounded while Fox war zone photo journalist and Irish citizen Pierre Zakrzewski, aged 55, and Ukrainian journalist and interpreter Oleksandra Kuvshinova, aged 24, were killed in the incident in Horenka, Kyiv Oblast. Benjamin was evacuated from a hospital in Kyiv by a non-governmental organization.

==== Injuries and recovery ====
Three weeks after the attack, Hall reported on Twitter that he had lost half of one leg, his foot on the other leg, suffered loss of function in one eye, damage to his hearing and injuries to a hand. He also paid tribute to his deceased colleagues.

Fox News Media CEO Suzanne Scott and President Jay Wallace visited Hall on 14 July 2022, at the Brooke Army Medical Center in Texas, where he had been recovering since the attack. Wallace wrote, "He looks incredible given everything he has endured, and he is truly an inspiration," in a note to Fox News staff.

On 14 September 2022, Benjamin Hall made a surprise appearance at the Fox News Quarterly Address exactly six months after the attack occurred. In part, he said "I remember thinking that day then when I was lying there that there was one thing I needed to do, and that was to get home, try somehow to get home and see my family. And what's happened from then to now with so much support, so much goodwill, so much help from everybody". He also said that the attack on him and his co-workers was "a story, not really of tragedy, but one of goodwill."

=== Return to broadcasting ===
On 26 January 2023, Hall returned to live television after months of being off the air while healing from the attack. He said he returned with no feet, one fully functioning hand, one eye, one fully working ear, and one leg. During the interview on Fox & Friends, he announced he wrote a book about the attack and the resulting months of healing called Saved: A War Reporter's Mission to Make it Home. The book was released on 14 March 2023, the first anniversary of the attack.

== Awards and recognition ==
In November 2022, Hall received the Courage Award at the 4th Annual Patriot Awards. In part he said "I wish I could be there in person to pick it up, but I can't yet. I am doing very well now," he said. "I'm walking a lot better. I'm seeing better. My injuries are getting better and that is all thanks to the people who came to save me. It's thanks to the people who put me back together."

In December 2022, Hall received the Foreign Press Award. Fox News President and Executive Editor Jay Wallace accepted Hall's award on his behalf, but Hall did give a recorded speech saying in part, "Thank you very much for this award tonight. I do think that this is not just an award for myself. It is an award for Pierre and for Sasha, who both died during that attack and also for every other war correspondent who has been injured or killed covering conflicts. And despite the attack... I think it is essential that people continue telling the news, telling the stories from war. I think that that's the only way we truly get to understand the atrocities, the disasters and the horror that's happening out there. And only then perhaps can good things can change come from it."

== Bibliography ==
Hall authored the book Inside ISIS: The Brutal Rise of a Terrorist Army, which was published by Hachette Book Group in 2015. Hall released his latest book, "Resolute: How We Humans Keep Finding Ways to Beat the Toughest Odds" on March 18, 2025.
