= Vira Hyrych =

Ukrainian journalist (1967–2022)

- Віра Гирич
- Born: 1967
- Died: 28 April 2022 (aged 54–55); Kyiv, Ukraine
- Cause of death: Missile strike
- Occupations: Journalist and radio producer
- Organizations: Radio Free Europe/Radio Liberty

Vira Hyrych (Ukrainian: Віра Гирич; also transliterated Vira Ghyrytch; 12 September 1967 – 28 April 2022) was a Ukrainian journalist and radio producer.

== Biography ==
Hyrych was born in 1967. In 2018, she began working for Radio Free Europe/Radio Liberty's Radio Svoboda.

She had previously worked for the Israeli embassy in Ukraine.

According to her colleague Maryana Drach, publishing editor of Radio Liberty, she was investigating the ecological trace left by the Russian fleet in the Black Sea.

== Death ==
She was killed on 28 April 2022, during the Russian invasion of Ukraine after the building in Kyiv where she lived was hit by a Russian missile.

Her death happened while UN Secretary General António Guterres was in Kyiv. The bombing was condemned by the French Minister for Europe and Foreign Affairs' Jean-Yves Le Drian.

== See also ==
- List of journalists killed during the Russo-Ukrainian War
