= Arman Soldin =

Bosnian-born French journalist (1991–2023)

- Soldin in 2021
- Born: 21 March 1991; Sarajevo, SR Bosnia and Herzegovina, SFR Yugoslavia
- Died: 9 May 2023 (aged 32); Chasiv Yar, Donetsk Oblast, Ukraine
- Cause of death: Rocket attack
- Citizenship: French
- Education: University College London; University of Sarajevo; Université Lumière
- Occupation: Journalist
- Years active: 2015–2023
- Employer: Agence France-Presse

Arman Soldin (21 March 1991 – 9 May 2023) was a Bosnian–French journalist killed at the age of 32 by a Russian-fired Grad rocket while reporting for Agence France-Presse in Ukraine near the city of Chasiv Yar, Donetsk Oblast during the Russian Invasion. His death was noted and deplored by journalists worldwide and by international leaders. France posthumously awarded him the Legion d’Honneur (Legion of Honour).

== Early life ==
Soldin was born on 21 March 1991 in Sarajevo, SR Bosnia and Herzegovina. He was evacuated with his mother Oksana (later a philosophy and sociology professor) to France on 25 April 1992, at the age of 12 months. The family returned to Bosnia after the ethnic conflict 6 years later, where Soldin attended primary school, but after the divorce of his parents in 2002, he lived in Rennes in Brittany. In addition to Bosnian as his native language, Soldin spoke French, English, and Italian. Precociously interested in news and journalism, at 16 he created a YouTube compilation Sarajevo in War, set to Italian composer Tomaso Albinoni's mournful Adagio.

== Education ==
Soldin took the French Baccalaureate, specialising in Science, with an upper second class honour at the Lycée Saint Martin, Rennes, 2006–2009. In 2013 at University College London he attained a BA in Politics & Eastern European Studies with Politics, Economics, History, and International Relations. While there, he was co-editor in chief of its Eureka Magazine, covering politics, society, arts and culture.

At the Academy of Sciences and Arts of Bosnia and Herzegovina, University of Sarajevo his 2014 MA was in Production and Management in performing arts, and cinematography and production in film and video; then in 2014–15 he graduated from the Université Lumière, Lyon with a Masters in Journalism – New Journalistic Practices.

== Career ==
Arman Soldin joined Agence France-Presse in 2015 as an intern in Rome and is remembered there by video reporter Sonia Logre as "a dream intern," who "wanted to do everything, see everything, know everything. He wanted humbly to learn, had a desire to discover Italy and a deep love of life." He reported on African refugee arrivals at the small Italian island of Lampedusa. He then worked for the agency's London office, reporting in June 2018 on the stand-off between the Italian government and the Lifeline humanitarian ship with 233 migrants on board, many ill, when it arrived in Malta after a week of waiting in the Mediterranean, and in October on Nationalist Milorad Dodik winning the seat reserved for Serbs in the Bosnian collegiate presidency. In 2019 he broke a story on the thirty-nine bodies, including that of a teenager, discovered in east London in a refrigerated lorry from Belgium. During the emergence of Brexit he wrote in December 2019 on Scottish Prime Minister Nicola Sturgeon's opposition to Brexit and her bid for a plebiscite on Scottish independence. From 2020 he was again posted to Rome.

Known as a gifted junior footballer for Stade Rennais in western France from 2006 to 2008, he ceased competition due to a knee injury, but used his experience as a sports commentator 2021–2023 on English Premier League, UEFA Women's Euro, UEFA Super Cup matches for Canal+ France. It was work he also conducted in between postings to Ukraine.

=== Ukraine ===
As the Russian invasion started in February 2022, Arman volunteered immediately to be among the France-Presse agency's first special envoys. He was later rotated, against his wishes, but returned to Ukraine in September 2022, working as a video coordinator. Frequently he used his mobile phone to record subjects who would otherwise be intimidated by a video camera, such as a woman digging in her garden in Chasiv Yar, or former welder Oleksandr delivering bread to sheltering civilians on his moped in Donbass. In Kherson in December 2022, Soldin produced video for AFP of risky civilian rescues of Ukrainians stranded on islands in the Dnieper River after Russian troops retreated in November to the other side of the Dnieper, but kept snipers and artillery trained along the river, rendering it a new front line. His coverage in January 2023 showed an intense Russian offensive on Soledar, and Vuhledar, in the eastern Donetsk Oblast. In April 2023 he covered Ukrainian soldiers digging defences near Bakhmut.

Soldin was an avid social media user. One of the stories which received attention was when he and his team found an injured hedgehog in a trench, fed and released it into the wild after a couple of days. In memory of AFP video reporter Arman Soldin, Olha Chevhaniuk of the UAnimals NGO announced a ₴100,000 (€2,475.13) grant for volunteers and shelters for the rescue of hedgehogs in war zones. She said:

We corresponded the day before yesterday, and today he died. Last week, French journalist Armand Soldin wrote to us and shared a video of how he and his colleagues rescued an exhausted hedgehog in a trench. He cured the animal and later released it into the wild. We edited a small story based on Arman's video, and it touched many of our subscribers. He thanked us, and we rejoiced at his kindness. And we just found out that Arman died. It was a numbing shock...we only knew each other online, but we had time to feel how kind and devoted this person was. When the news of Armand's death came out, we consulted and decided to at least symbolically honour his memory.

== Death ==
On 9 May 2023, the team was near the city of Chasiv Yar, Donetsk Oblast, together with a detachment of Ukrainian soldiers. Soldin was killed by a Grad rocket which exploded near the place he was lying. Nobody else was injured. Emmanuel Peuchot, an experienced war correspondent who joined the team last October reported that Soldin died "with his camera in his hand", "his face showing no signs of suffering." Soldin was 32.

Gulnoza Said, the Committee to Protect Journalists' Europe and Central Asia program coordinator in New York City responded to news of his death with the statement:

The Committee to Protect Journalists is profoundly saddened by the death of journalist Arman Soldin while covering the war in Ukraine. We extend our deep condolences to his friends and family. Journalists are civilians whose reporting from war zones is essential. We call on Russian and Ukrainian authorities to thoroughly investigate the circumstances of Soldin’s death.

The CPJ noted that Soldin is the 17th journalist to be killed in Ukraine since 2022. Reporters Without Borders global news director Phil Chetwynd remarked that;

Arman's brilliant work encapsulates everything that makes us so proud of AFP journalism in Ukraine. Arman's death is a terrible reminder of the risks and dangers of reporting on this war.

The killing of Arman Soldin was condemned by the Director-General of UNESCO Audrey Azoulay in a press-release published on May 10, 2023. UNESCO's mandate to "promote the free flow of ideas by word and image" includes the protection of journalists and media workers against any forms of attacks and reprisals related to their duties. The facts and circumstances surrounding this killing are categorized and archived online on UNESCO's Observatory of Killed Journalists. The Observatory archives publicly accessible information on all the journalists killed in relation to their duties since 1997, where the Director-General has issued a condemnation. Agence France-Presse director for Europe Christine Buhagiar remembered Soldin as "enthusiastic, energetic and courageous," and journalists and staff of AFP in Paris and across the world held a minute of silence on 11 May to remember their colleague. French President Emmanuel Macron used Twitter to announce that "a journalist from Agence France-Presse, one of our compatriots, Arman Soldin, was killed in Ukraine. With courage, from the first hours of the conflict he was at the front to establish the facts," and that "we share the pain of his loved ones and his colleagues". On 1 June 2023, in its Paris headquarters, AFP conducted a memorial ceremony for Soldin, and announced that in the following week its journalists would return to frontline reporting in Ukraine. AFP Information Director Phil Chetwynd emailed agency employees, detailing the circumstances of his death;

Arman died from Grad rocket fire near the village of Chasiv Yar in eastern Ukraine, while our team of four journalists moved away from the front lines, escorted by two Ukrainian soldiers, ... his colleagues on the ground believe that he may have tried to reach the trench a few meters ahead, instead of throwing himself to the ground ... the rocket fell very close to Arman and he died almost instantly.

White House spokeswoman Karine Jean-Pierre said that the "world owes a debt to Arman Soldin, an AFP journalist who lost his life today on the front line of the war in Ukraine...journalism is one of the foundations of a free society".

According to global monitoring on the safety of journalists achieved by the Observatory of Killed journalists, Soldin was the 3rd media professional killed in Ukraine in 2023.

French anti-terror investigation unit the Central Office for Combating Core International Crimes and Hate Crimes (Office central de lutte contre les crimes contre l'humanité, OCLCH). have launched a war crime investigation into the death of Soldin and will probe the circumstances of Soldin's death, the prosecutors said.

Soldin is survived by his mother Oksana, his sister Ena, and younger brother Sven.
