= Horenka, Bucha Raion, Kyiv Oblast =

Horenka Горенка
- Village
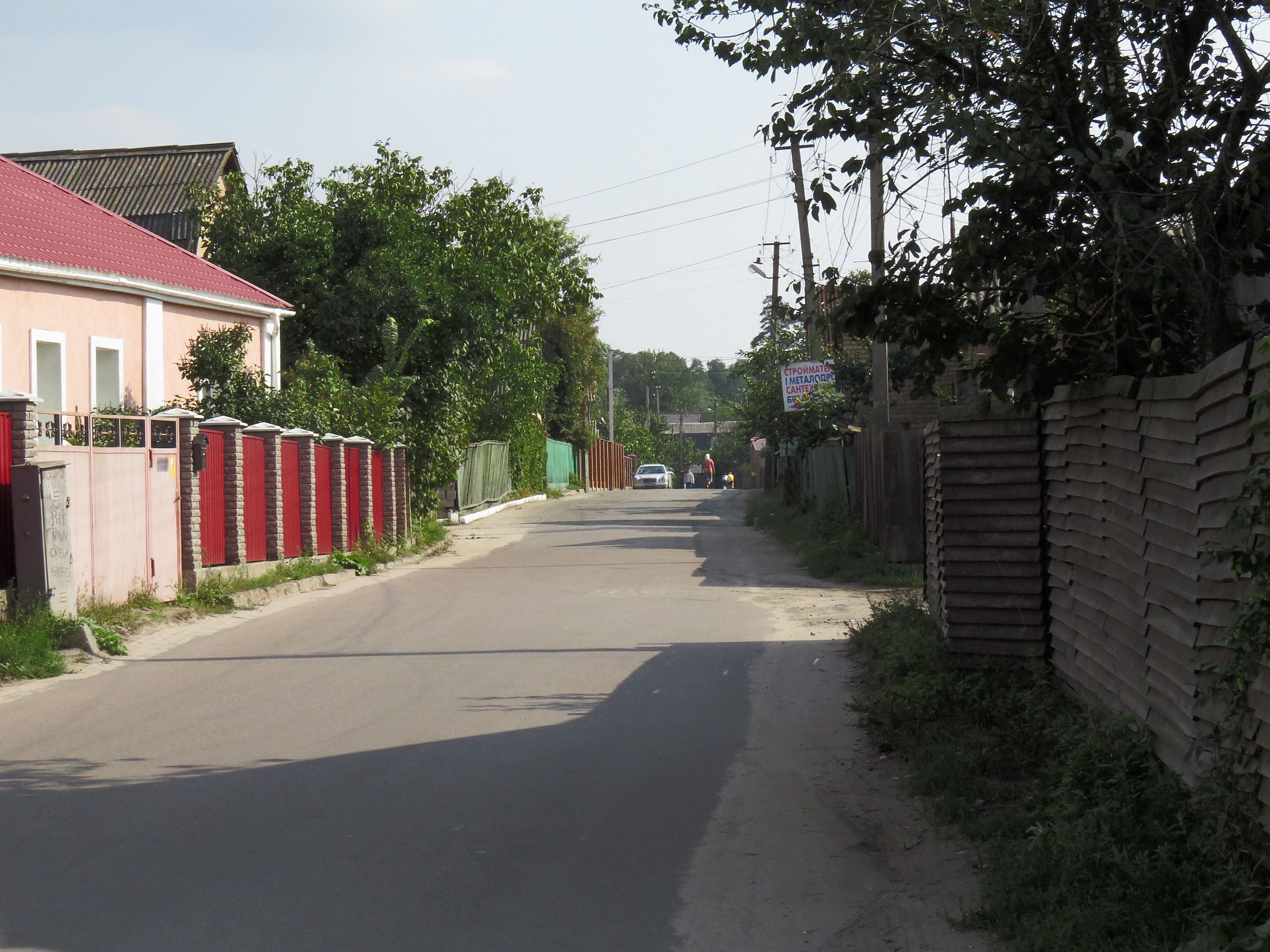
- Kyivska Street

- Location of Horenka within Ukraine Horenka (Ukraine)
- Coordinates: 50.556944°N 30.3175°E
- Country: Ukraine
- Oblast: Kyiv Oblast
- Raion: Bucha Raion
- Hromada: Hostomel settlement hromada
- Status: 1552

Area
  - Total: 29.1 km^{2} (11.2 sq mi)
- Elevation: 116 m (381 ft)

Population (2001 census)
  - Total: 5,358
  - Density: 184/km^{2} (477/sq mi)
- Time zone: UTC+2 (EET)
  - Summer (DST): UTC+3 (EEST)
- Postal code: 08105
- Area code: +380 4598

Horenka (Ukrainian: Горенка; Russian: Горенка) is a village in Bucha Raion (district) in Kyiv Oblast of Ukraine, on the NW border of the city of Kyiv. It belongs to Hostomel settlement hromada, one of the hromadas of Ukraine.

Until 18 July 2020, Horenka was located in Kyiv-Sviatoshyn Raion. The raion was abolished that day as part of the administrative reform of Ukraine, which reduced the number of raions of Kyiv Oblast to seven. The area of Kyiv-Sviatoshyn Raion was split between Bucha, Fastiv, and Obukhiv Raions, with Horenka being transferred to Bucha Raion.

On March 14, 2022, during the Russian invasion of Ukraine, journalists Pierre Zakrzewski and Oleksandra Kuvshinova, respectively a camera operator for and contractor with Fox News, were fatally wounded in the village. Their colleague Benjamin Hall was seriously injured.

== Gallery ==
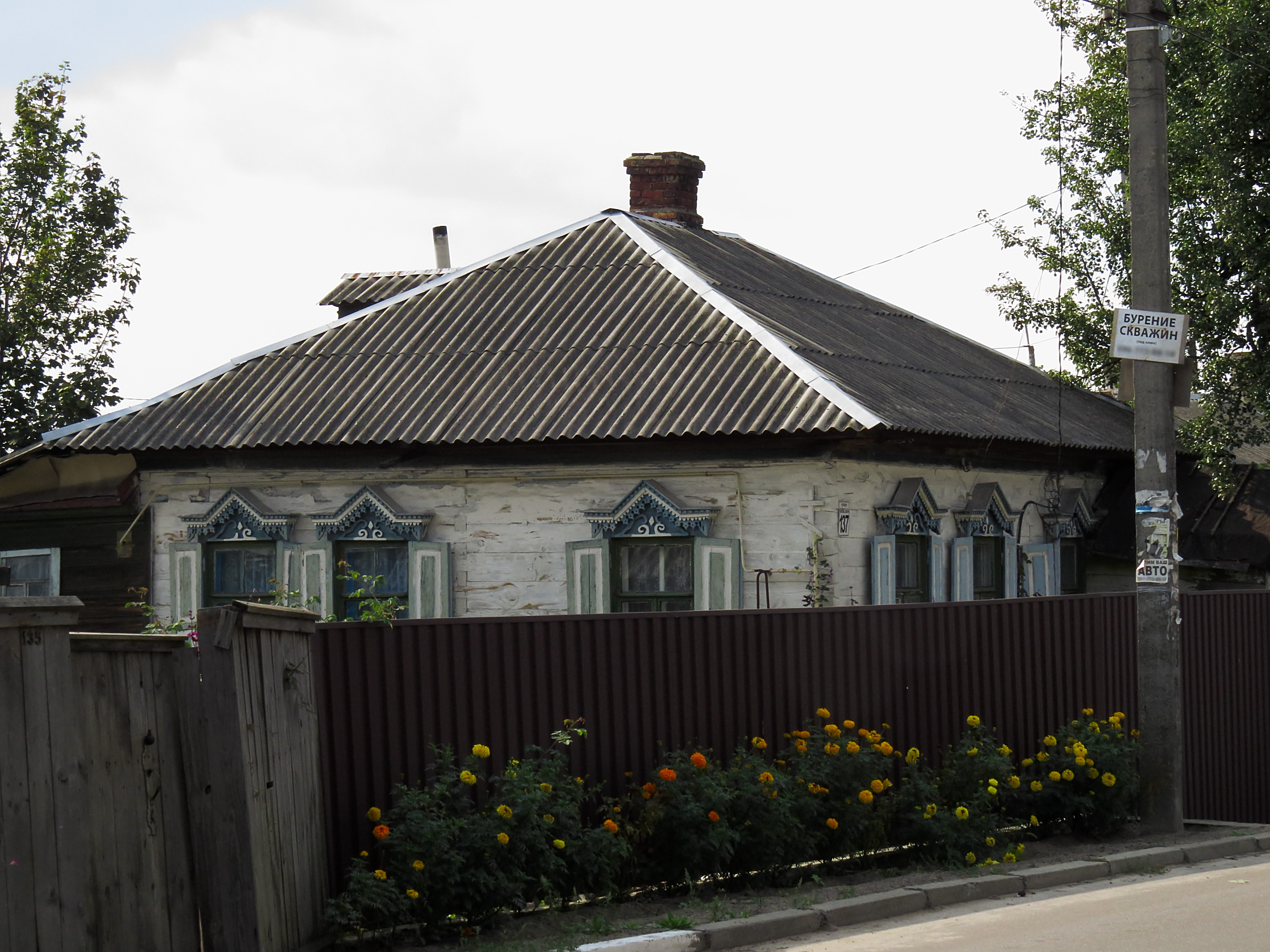
A wooden house

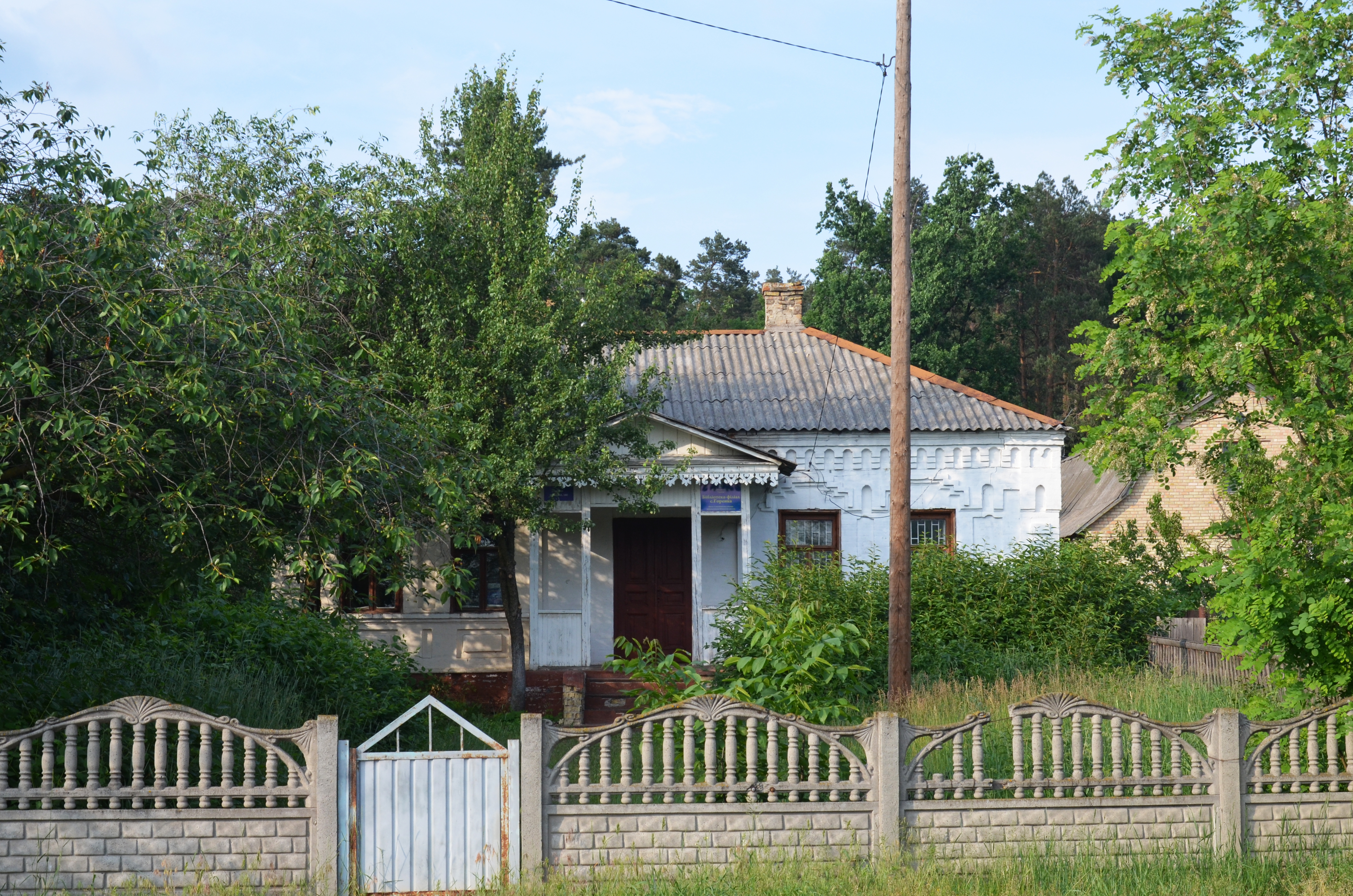
Branch of the village library

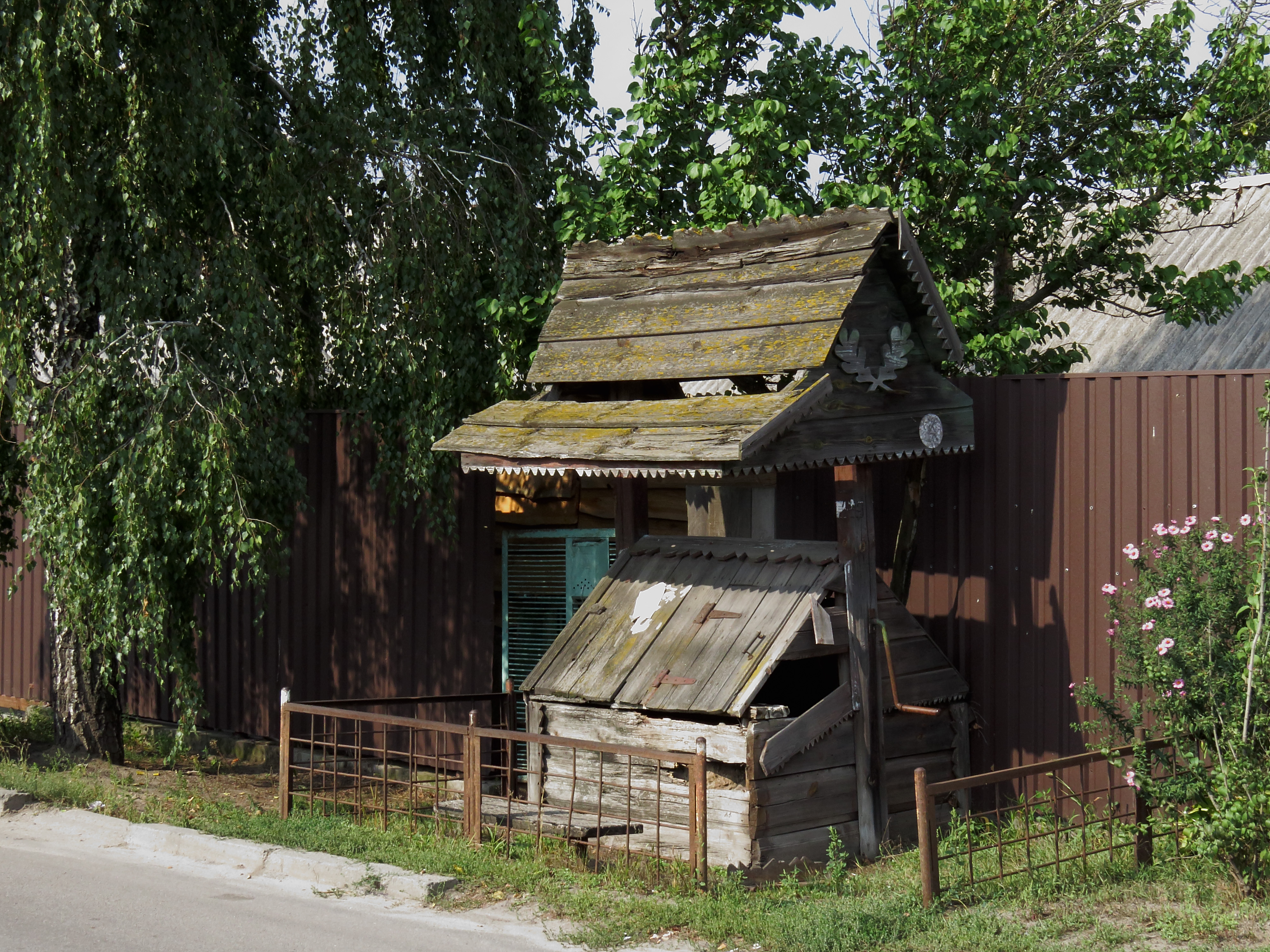
A well

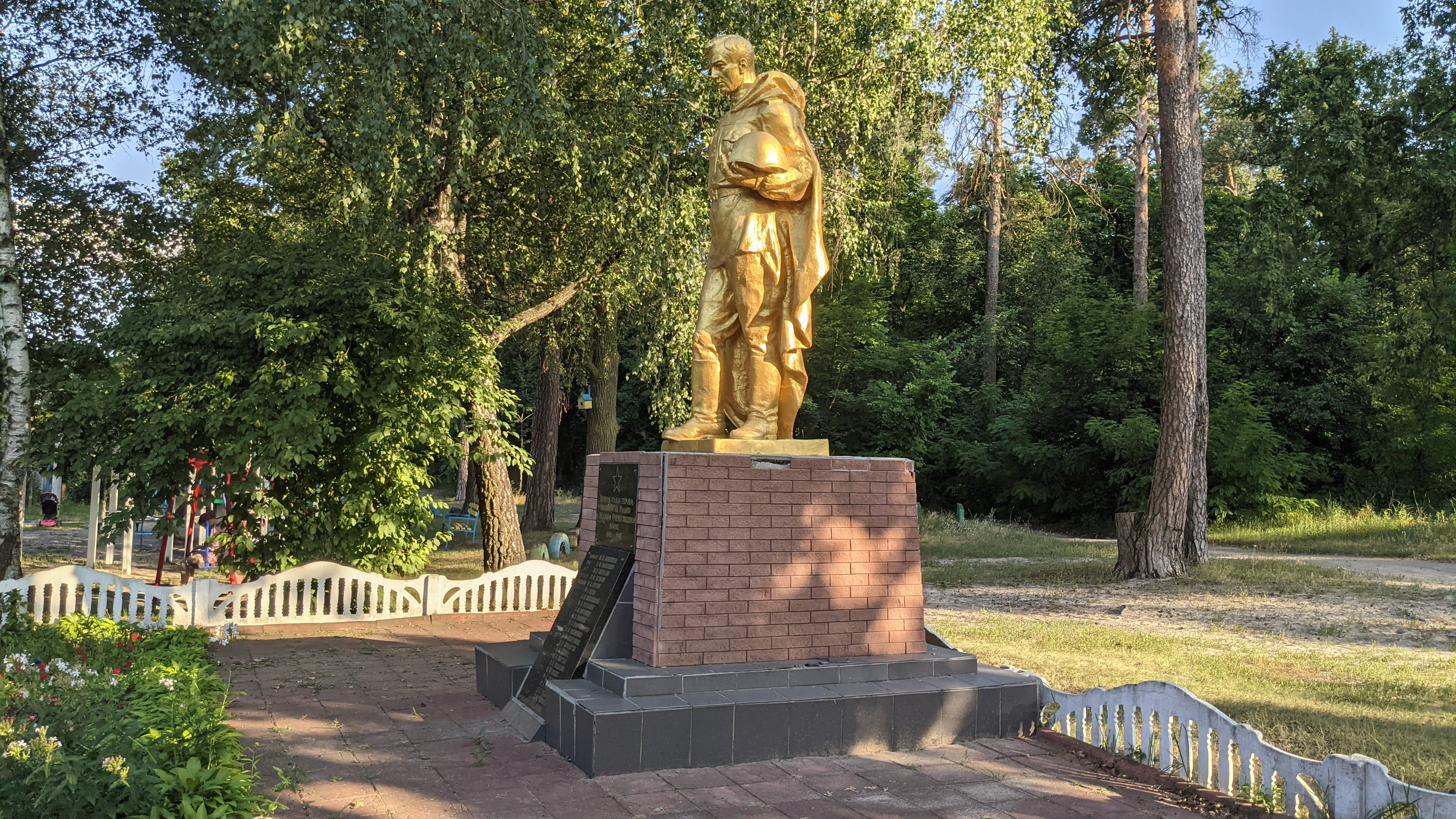
Mass grave of Soviet soldiers

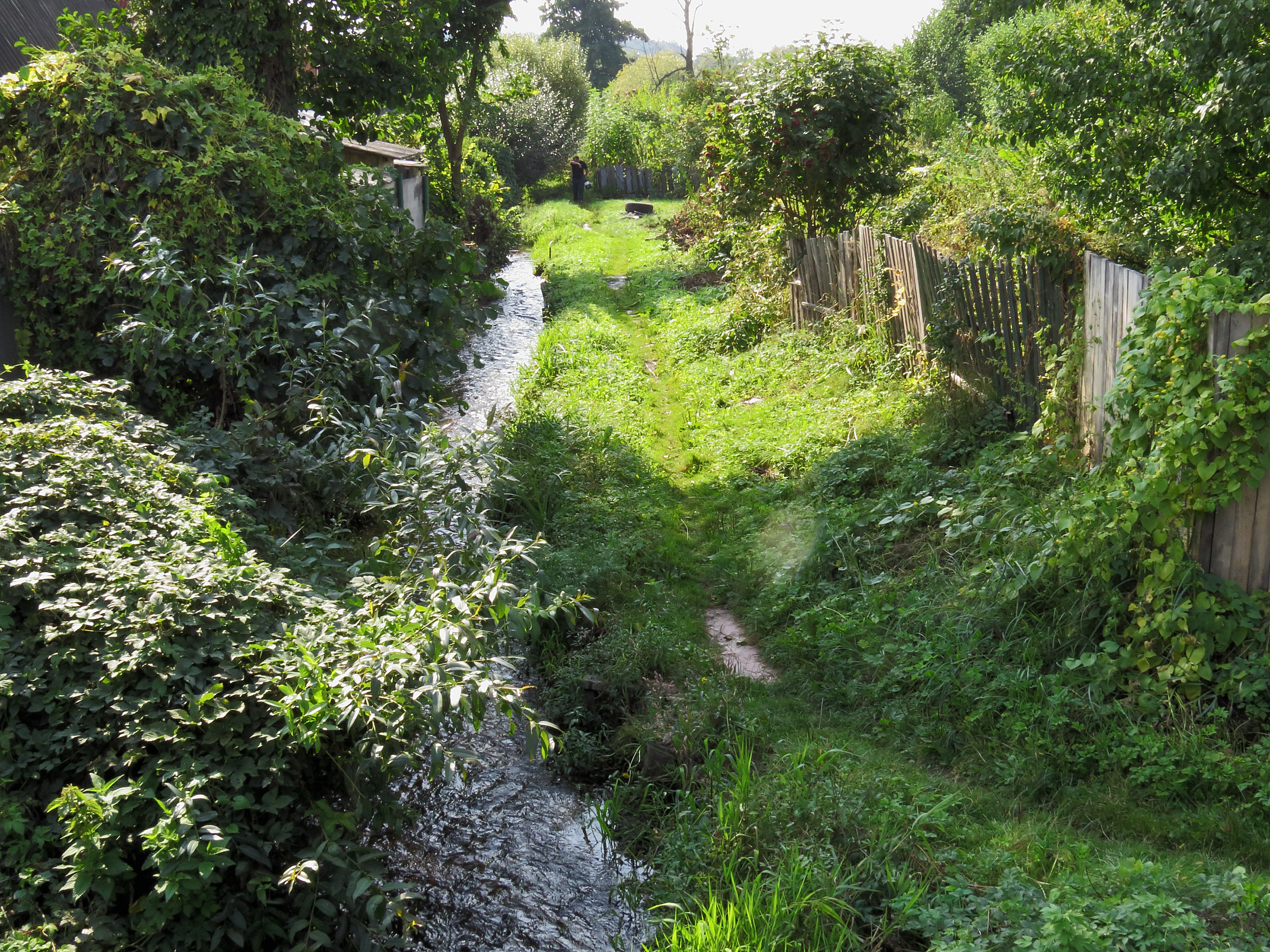
Horenka River, from which the name of the village originates

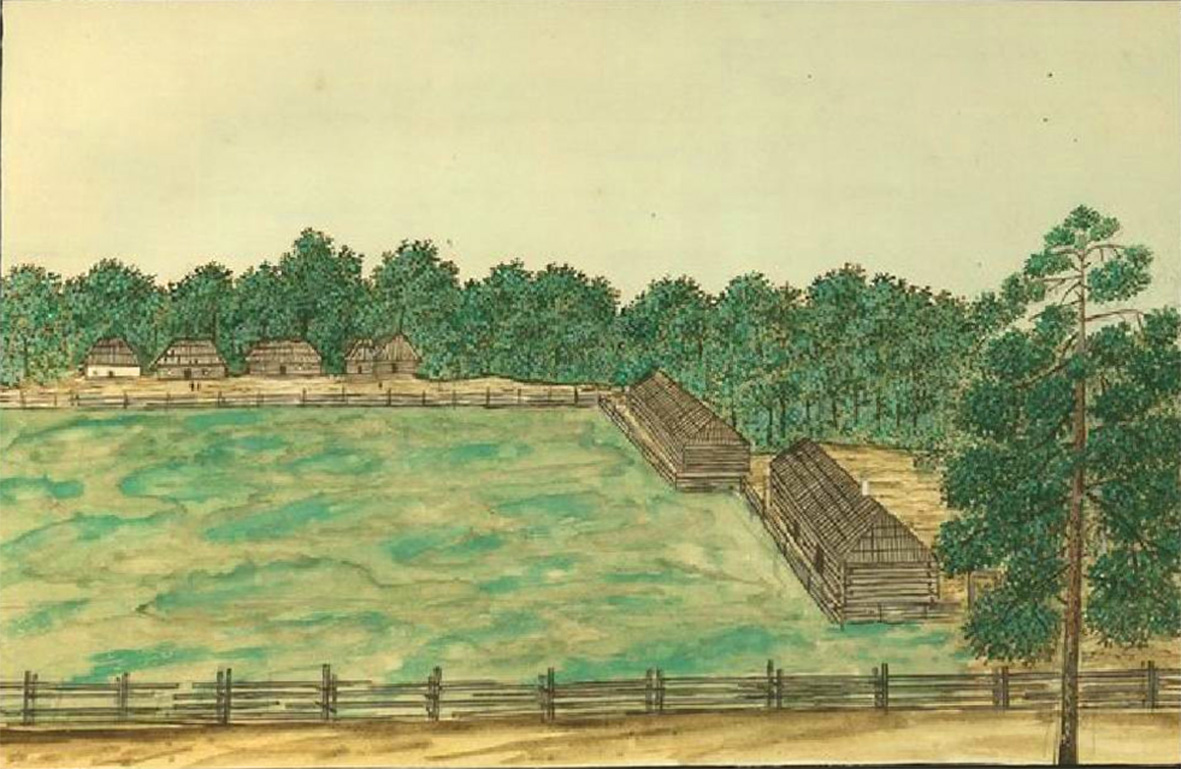
Drawing of Horenka by Dominique Pierre de la Flise (1854)
