= Melekine =

Melekine Мелекіне
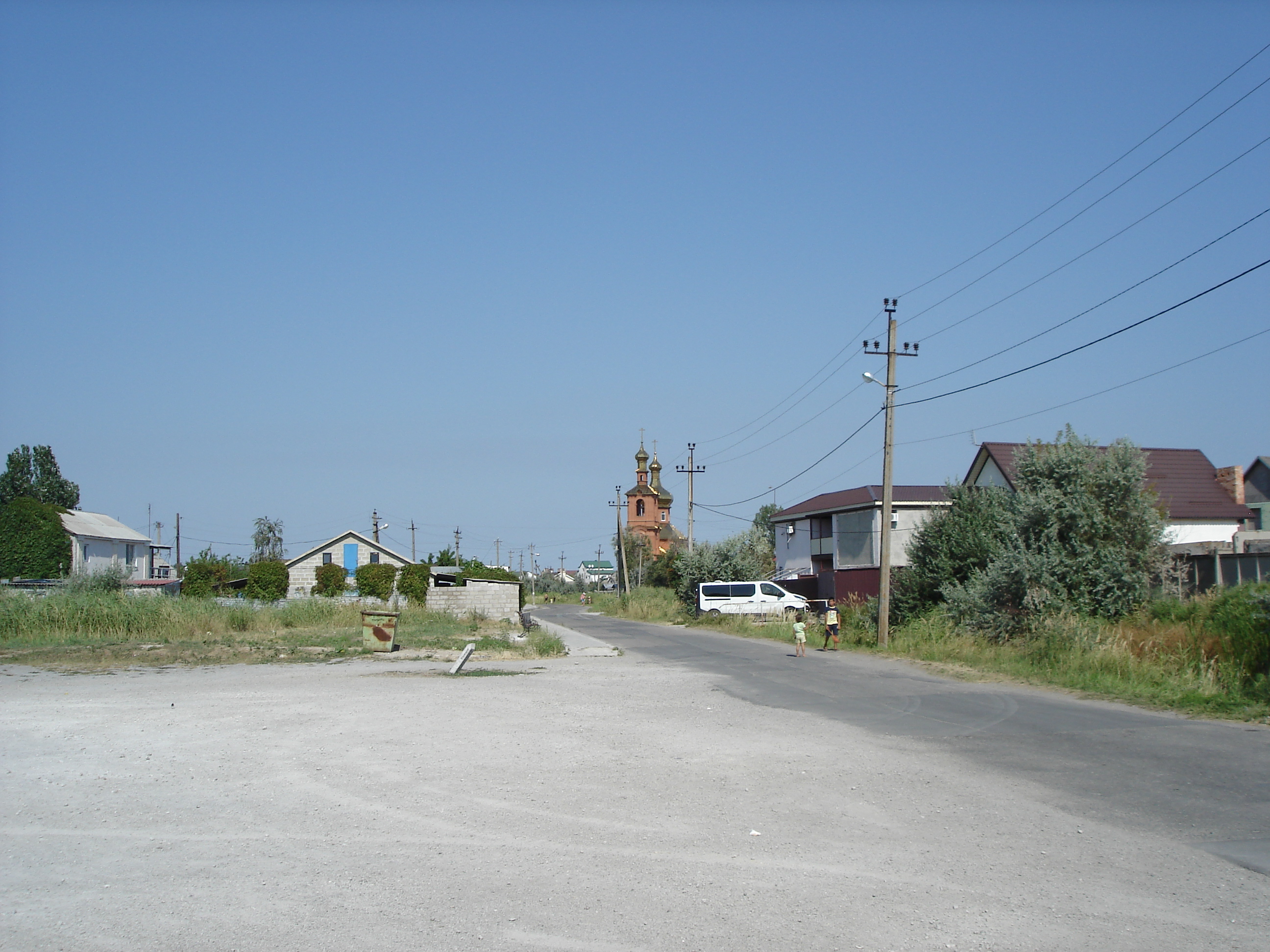

- Location in Ukraine
- Coordinates: 46°57′12″N 37°23′18″E
- Country: Ukraine
- Oblast: Donetsk Oblast
- Raion: Mariupol Raion
- Hromada: Manhush settlement hromada
- Established: 19th c.
- Time zone: UTC+2 (EET)
  - Summer (DST): UTC+3 (EEST)
- Postal code: 87441
- Area code: 6297

Melekine (Ukrainian: Мелекіне) is a village in the Mariupol Raion of Donetsk Oblast, 23 km (14 mi) from Mariupol.

Melekine is a sea resort and an administrative center of Melekine village council that combines several neighboring villages. It was established sometime in the 19th century as a fisherman company by a landowner Meleko. With the establishment of the Soviet regime in the area, the village was reformed into a fishermen collective farm.

Today Melekine (until 2009 Melekyne) has numerous sea resorts that stretch along the coast of the Sea of Azov.

The village was mentioned in the song "Melekino" of a local Russian-Ukrainian rap-group.

== Monuments and memorials ==
There is a gazebo on the road, on the outskirts of the village, and a memorial sign dedicated to the founders of the village of Melekine.

Existing monuments

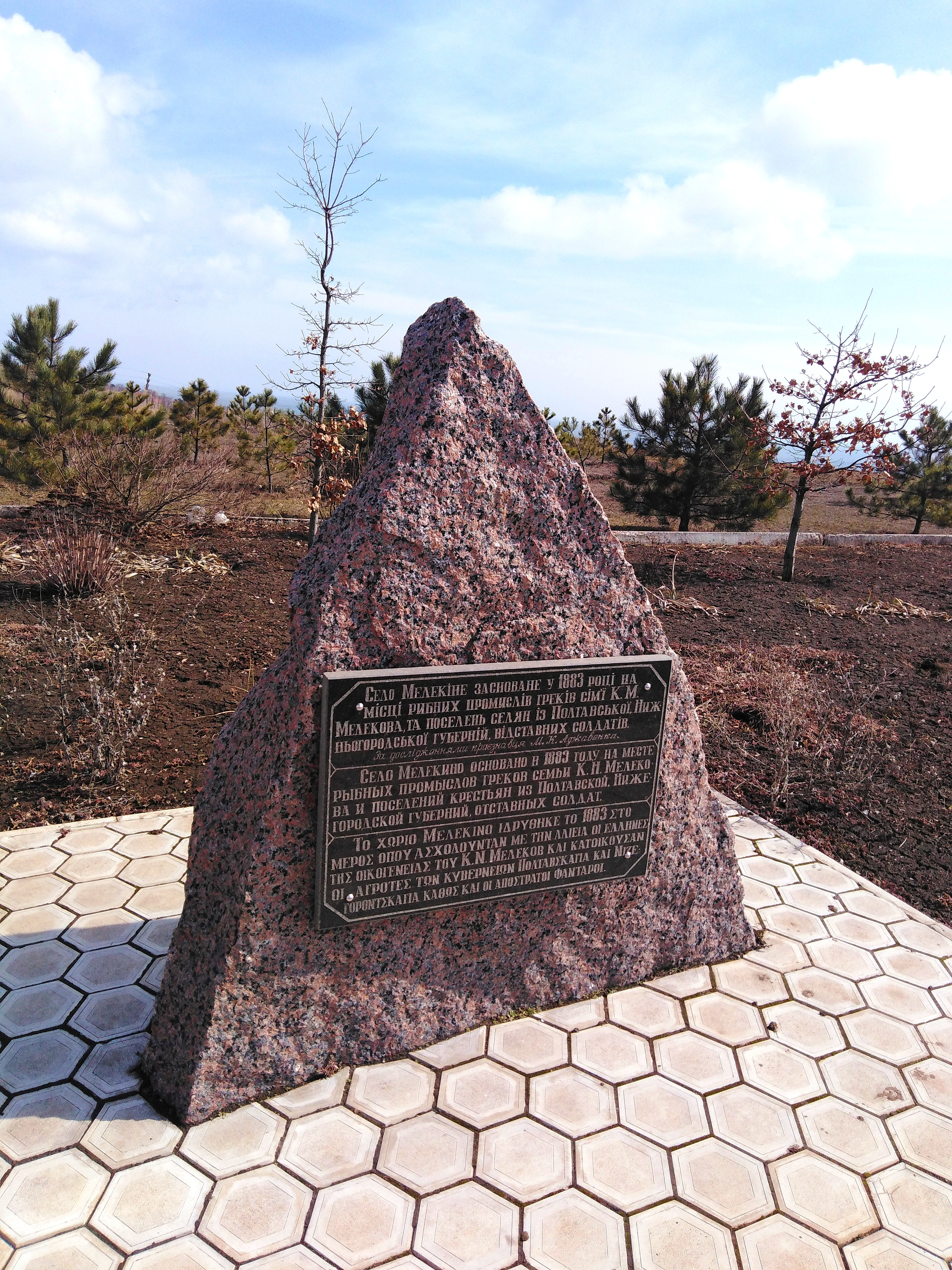
The memorial is dedicated to the Greek Melekov family

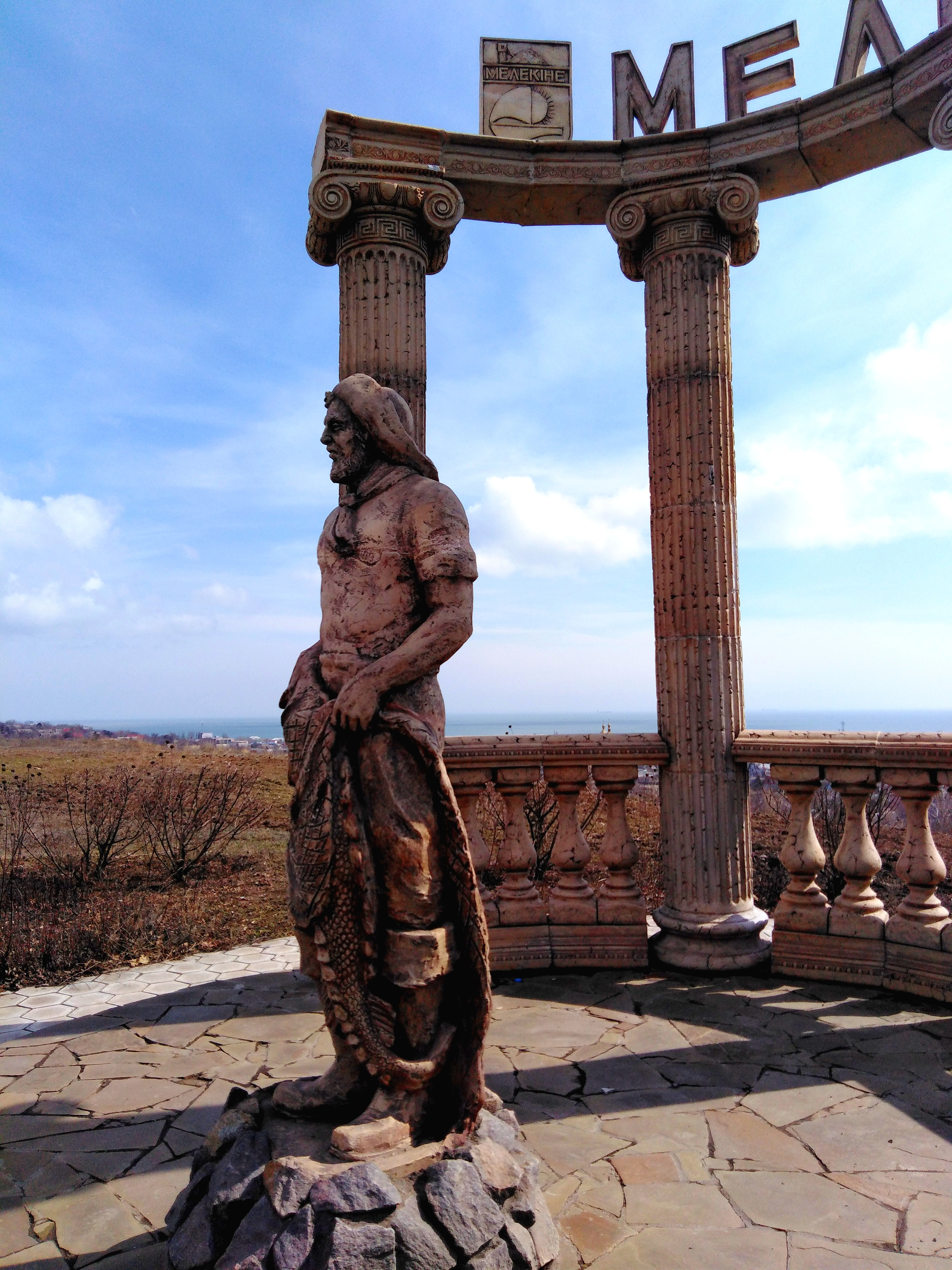
Monument to the fisherman in the colonnade

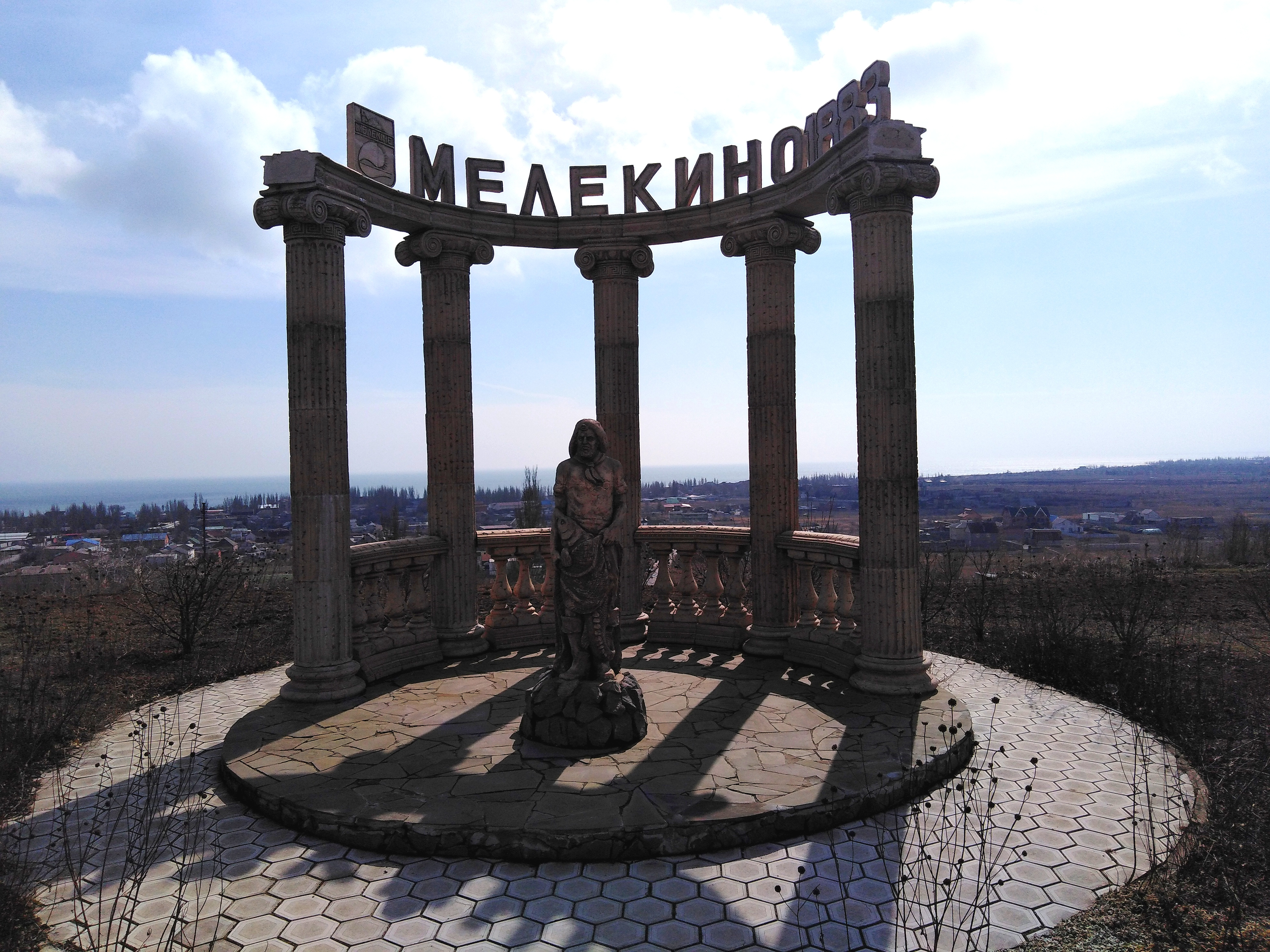
Colonnade
