= Serhiy Nikolayev =

Ukrainian photographer

- Сергій Ніколаєв
- Born: February 14, 1972; Kyiv, Ukraine
- Died: February 28, 2015 (aged 43); Pisky, Donetsk Oblast, Ukraine
- Cause of death: In Crossfire / Combat
- Occupation: Photojournalist
- Employer: Segodnya
- Notable work: Photo exhibit, "A Childhood not for Children" 2013
- Title: National Hero of Ukraine
- Children: Valeriya Kravchuk

Serhiy Vladyslavovych Nikolayev (Ukrainian: Сергій Владиславович Ніколаєв; (Note: First name also transliterated Serhii, Sergii or from Russian Sergey, last name also transliterated Nikolaiev or Nikolaev, but according to the standard naming conventions of Wikipedia, the full name should be transliterated as Serhii Vladyslavovych Nikolaiev) 14 February 1972 – 28 February 2015) was a Ukrainian photojournalist for the Ukrainian daily newspaper Segodnya in Kyiv, Ukraine. He was killed when caught in the shelling or crossfire at Pisky, East Ukraine.

== Personal ==
Serhiy lived in Kyiv, Ukraine. He graduated from Kyiv National University of Construction and Architecture in 1993 and was a member of the National Union of Journalists of Ukraine. Serhiy Nikolayev's only daughter is Valeriya Kravchuk, who was born in 1995.

== Career ==
Serhiy was a photojournalist for Segodnya since April 2008. Georgia, Libya, Somalia, and Syria were other sites Serhiy covered during his career. He focused on war and its impact on children. In 2013, he held an exhibition called "A Childhood not for Children."

== Death ==
Donetsk, which is shown in relation to the capital Kyiv, Ukraine.

Nikolayev was previously attacked by members of the Berkut special police forces when reporting on a "Euromaidan" event in Kyiv on 1 December 2013.

Nikolayev was killed in crossfire while covering fighting between Ukrainian troops and pro-Russian separatists in the village of Pisky on the outskirts of Donetsk on 28 February 2015. Pisky is located just 1.5 kilometers away from Donetsk airport. He was there with colleague Bogdan Rossinsky, Rossinsky was non-lethally wounded and Serhiy suffered serious injuries. The injury was caused by a fragment of a shell. Serhiy arrived alive at Krasnoarmiysk hospital in Donetsk, but his injuries were fatal and he died. He was wearing a bulletproof vest marked as "Press" at the scene. Nikolay (or Mykola) Flerko, a volunteer in Right Sector battalion was also declared dead from the shell.

The police in Krasnoarmeysk (now Pokrovsk) are investigating the incident as a deliberate homicide.

== Context ==
The conflict, between pro-Russian separatists and Ukrainian military, arose after former Ukraine President Viktor Yanukovych's departure in March 2014. Russian President Vladimir Putin ordered the invasion of Ukraine and the occupation of Ukraine's Crimean Peninsula with the pretext to "protect ethnic Russians living there." Russia continues supplying separatists and maintaining an armed conflict with the Ukrainian Government.

A ceasefire stopping the shelling and pulling back heavy weapons was issued on 15 February 2015. However, on 28 February 2015, Russian-supported separatists violated the ceasefire by recommencing their shelling attacks.

== Impact ==
Both sides (pro-Russian separatists and Ukrainian troops) were blamed for the death. Petro Poroshenko, president of Ukraine, submitted a bill to parliament for the United Nations peacekeepers to monitor the ceasefire. Both government troops and separatists agreed to the continuation of withdrawing heavy weapons.

== Reactions ==
Irina Bokova, director-general of UNESCO, said, "I condemn the killing of Sergii Nikolaiev. I call on all in Ukraine to ensure the safety of media workers."

Reporters Without Borders issued the following statement, "We offer our condolences to the family and colleagues of this talented photographer, who was the seventh media professional to be killed while covering the conflict in eastern Ukraine."

The Russian Union of Journalists' release said, "...shocked by this new tragedy, the murder of Ukrainian photographer Sergii Nikolaiev. We believe that we can work together in an investigation on all the killings of journalists and media workers in the region. The perpetrators and masterminds behind these attacks should be brought to justice."

Olga Guk, editor-in-chief of Segodnya, said, "He would go with his camera into the fire so that he could show life as it happened. He did not spare himself. He was the bravest of professionals." President Petro Poroshenko appointed a scholarship for Serhiy's daughter Valeriya Kravchuk.

== Awards ==
Awarded the title of "National Hero of Ukraine" by presidential decree on June 5, 2015.

== See also ==
- 2014–15 Russian military intervention in Ukraine
- Freedom of the press in Ukraine
- List of heroes of Ukraine
