= Death of Andrey Stenin =

2014 incident in Ukraine

Andrey Stenin
- Андрей Стенин
- Born: 22 December 1980; Pechora, Komi ASSR, Russian SFSR, Soviet Union
- Died: 6 August 2014 (aged 33); Snizhne, Ukraine
- Cause of death: Killed in action (gunshot wound)
- Occupations: Journalist; photojournalist; war photographer

On 5 August 2014, Andrey Alexeyevich Stenin (Russian: Андрей Алексеевич Стенин), a Russian photojournalist, disappeared while covering the War in Donbas. He was confirmed dead on 3 September 2014, having died on 6 August according to the Investigative Committee of Russia.

== Background ==
Andrey Stenin (Russian: Андрей Алексеевич Стенин, also transliterated Andrei, who died 6 August 2014) started his career as a text reporting journalist for Rossiyskaya Gazeta from 2003 and Gazeta.ru. In 2008 he turned to photojournalism and from 2009 on worked as a photo reporter for RIA Novosti. He was an experienced military photojournalist who had worked in Egypt, Syria, Libya, the Gaza Strip and elsewhere.

Stenin was quoted after his death as saying, "Journalists are the eyes of the citizens and the world."

== Disappearance and death ==
Stenin was allegedly embedded with Russian-backed combatants in Ukraine. Critics have labelled his activity a part of the fabrication of war propaganda. After Stenin's disappearance, Anton Gerashchenko, an official with Ukraine's Interior Ministry suggested in an interview with the Latvian radio station Baltkom that the photojournalist might have been detained in the conflict area by Ukraine's security services. However, this is inconsistent with the later findings of Russia's Investigative Committee.

He went missing on 5 August 2014. The International Federation of Journalists (IFJ), the European Federation of Journalists (EFJ), Human Rights Watch and Amnesty International expressed their concern for Stenin's safety. Reports in August indicated that Stenin's remains were found with the bodies of two other people.

On 3 September Stenin was confirmed dead. Russia's Investigative Committee said DNA tests had confirmed Stenin's identity. According to the Russian Foreign Ministry he was in a vehicle traveling in a convoy of escaping civilians when the convoy came under heavy fire in an area controlled by the Ukrainian military and National Guard. Andrey Stenin was the fourth Russian journalist killed in Ukraine in just a few months:

- Igor Kornelyuk and Anton Voloshin, employees of the VGTRK radio and television network, were killed in June near Luhansk.
- At the end of June, First TV Channel cameraman Anatoly Klyan was mortally wounded near Donetsk.

== Aftermath ==
The UN issued a statement deploring his death, calling for an investigation and justice to be brought against those responsible.

Stenin was awarded Russia's Order of Courage posthumously.

== See also ==
- Material Evidence (exhibition)
