= Death of Anatoly Klyan =

2014 incident in Donetsk, Ukraine

Anatoly Klyan
- Анатолий Сергеевич Клян
- Born: January 23, 1946
- Died: June 30, 2014 (aged 68); Donetsk, Ukraine
- Resting place: Troyekurovskoye Cemetery
- Occupation: Camera operator
- Years active: 40 years
- Employer: Channel One Russia

On 30 June 2014, Anatoly Klyan, a Russian Channel One cameraman, was shot and fatally injured while traveling in a bus in Donetsk, Ukraine during the 2014 pro-Russian unrest and evidence of a violation of the cease-fire agreement.

== Background ==
Amidst the War in Donbas, a group pro-Russian separatists organized a trip of civilians and journalists to a Ukrainian military base near the village of Avdiivka, north of Donetsk. The civilians included many mothers of Ukrainian soldiers, who were reportedly making the trip with the hope of bringing their sons home. According to Forbes-Russia and Ekho Moskvy, the separatists had told journalists that they had negotiated the surrender of a Ukrainian army unit, and invited the journalists to film soldiers being greeted by their mothers.

== Personal life ==
Anatoly Klyan (Russian: Анатолий Сергеевич Клян, born 23 January 1946) was from Russia. He was an experienced cameraman for the Russian Channel One who had covered many conflicts in areas such as Nicaragua, Yugoslavia, Angola, Mongolia, and Chechnya. Klyan worked for Channel One Russia (Pervy Kanal). He was 68 years old and had worked in journalism for 40 years when his death occurred.

== Death ==
Anatoly Klyan was killed in Donetsk, which is shown in relation to the capital Kyiv, Ukraine.

Late in the evening of Sunday 29 June, as the bus approached the military base, it came under gunfire. Klyan was shot in the stomach, but he continued to film on the bus until he told his colleagues that he could no longer carry the camera. The bus then turned around and drove a few hundred meters away before stopping. The bus driver, who was wearing camouflage, had also been shot in the neck.

The gunfire continued as the passengers began to leave the bus. Klyan was helped into a passing-by car and taken to a nearby hospital, where he later died from his wounds.

== Aftermath ==
The Russian Foreign Ministry released a statement saying Klyan's death "has again showed convincingly that the security forces of Ukraine clearly do not want to de-escalate the conflict in the east of the country and block the truce instead," and accused Ukraine of deliberately endangering the lives of Russian journalists. Ukrainian prosecutors announced that they would begin an investigation into the incident. Both sides were accused of having violated a 10-day cease-fire, which had been set to expire at 10:00pm the next day.

Klyan was interred at the Troyekurovskoye Cemetery in Moscow with several colleagues who also died in Ukraine in 2014 while reporting. The other journalists buried there are Andrey Stenin, Igor Kornelyuk, and Anton Voloshin. Klyan's death was part of a series of journalist deaths in Ukraine. He was the fifth journalist that was killed in the region in 2014. VGTRK lost two journalists and a technician in another incident in Luhansk on June 17.

Klyan's death, along with other journalists in Ukraine, caused anger in Moscow, as Moscow has condemned the attacks on it journalists there. Klyan's death also was part of a violation of the Ukrainian-declared ceasefire. Ukrainian soldiers were blamed by the Russian foreign ministry for the attack that occurred. The Russian foreign ministry demanded an investigation into the assault and attack. They demanded a punishment for the ones responsible for everything that happened.

Irina Bokova, director-general of UNESCO, said, "I condemn the murder of Anatoly Klyan. I call on the authorities to conduct an investigation into the murder and bring to account those responsible. Journalists covering events in Ukraine must have an opportunity to fulfill their professional duty, which is to provide citizens with unbiased information and promote news-based discussions without any fear for their own lives."

According to a BBC News analysis by Stephen Ennis Klyan's employer has in its reports about Ukraine "sought to further demonise and dehumanise the Ukrainian army".

== See also ==
- Freedom of the press in Ukraine
