= Arsen Avakov =

Minister of Internal Affairs of Ukraine from 2014 to 2021

- Арсен Аваков
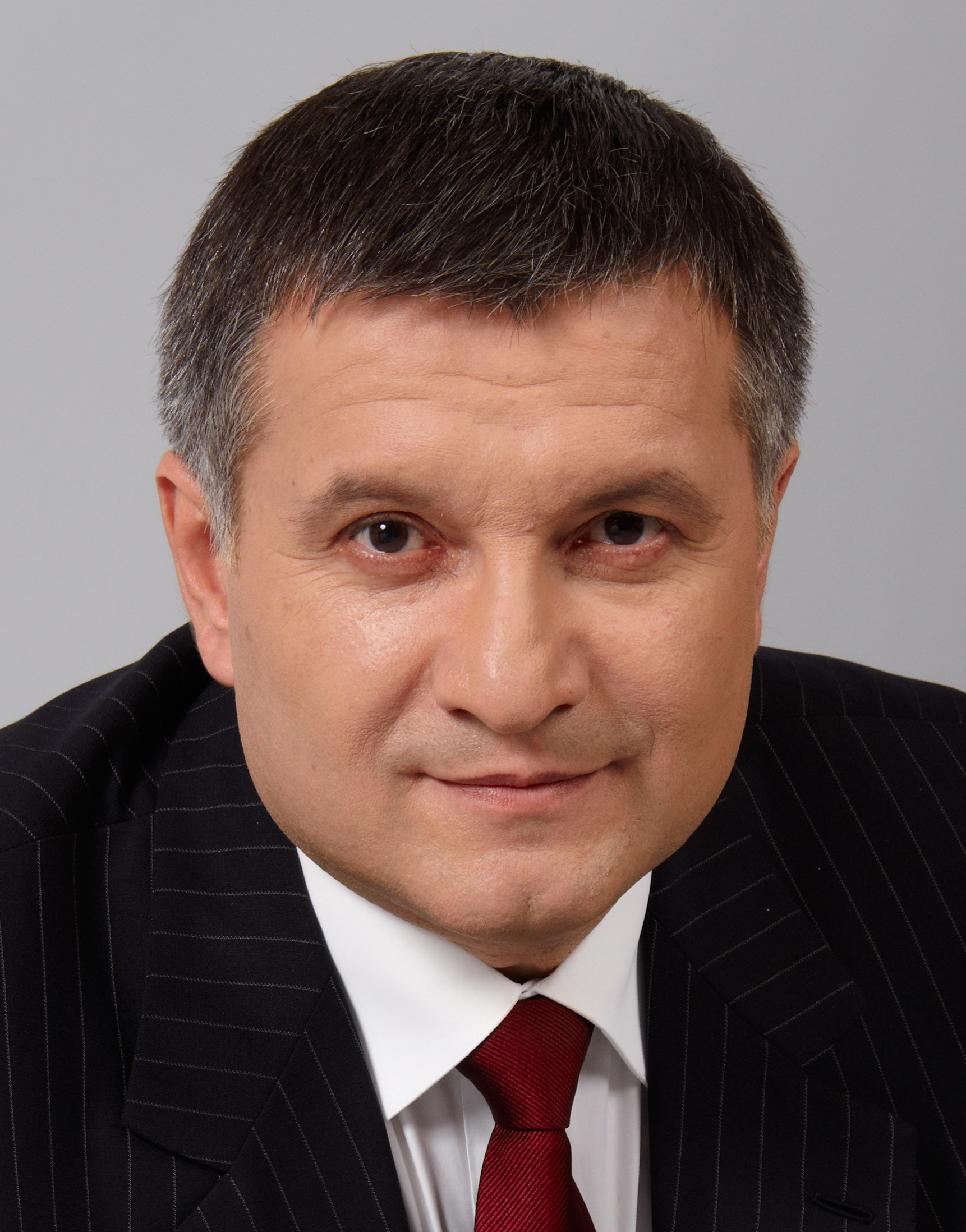
- Avakov in 2010

Minister of Internal Affairs
- In office 22 February 2014 – 15 July 2021; Acting: 22 – 27 February 2014
- President: Oleksandr Turchynov (acting); Petro Poroshenko; Volodymyr Zelenskyy
- Prime Minister: Oleksandr Turchynov (acting); Arseniy Yatsenyuk; Volodymyr Groysman (acting); Arseniy Yatsenyuk; Volodymyr Groysman; Oleksiy Honcharuk; Denys Shmyhal
- Preceded by: Vitaliy Zakharchenko
- Succeeded by: Denys Monastyrsky

Governor of Kharkiv Oblast
- In office 4 February 2005 – 9 February 2010
- Preceded by: Stepan Maselsky
- Succeeded by: Mykhailo Dobkin; Volodymyr Babayev (Acting)

Personal details
- Born: 2 January 1964 (age 62) Kirovsky, Azerbaijani SSR, Soviet Union
- Citizenship: Ukraine
- Party: People's Front (since 2014)
- Other political affiliations: Fatherland (2010–2014); Our Ukraine (until 2010)
- Spouse: Inna Avakova
- Children: 1
- Education: Kharkiv Polytechnic Institute
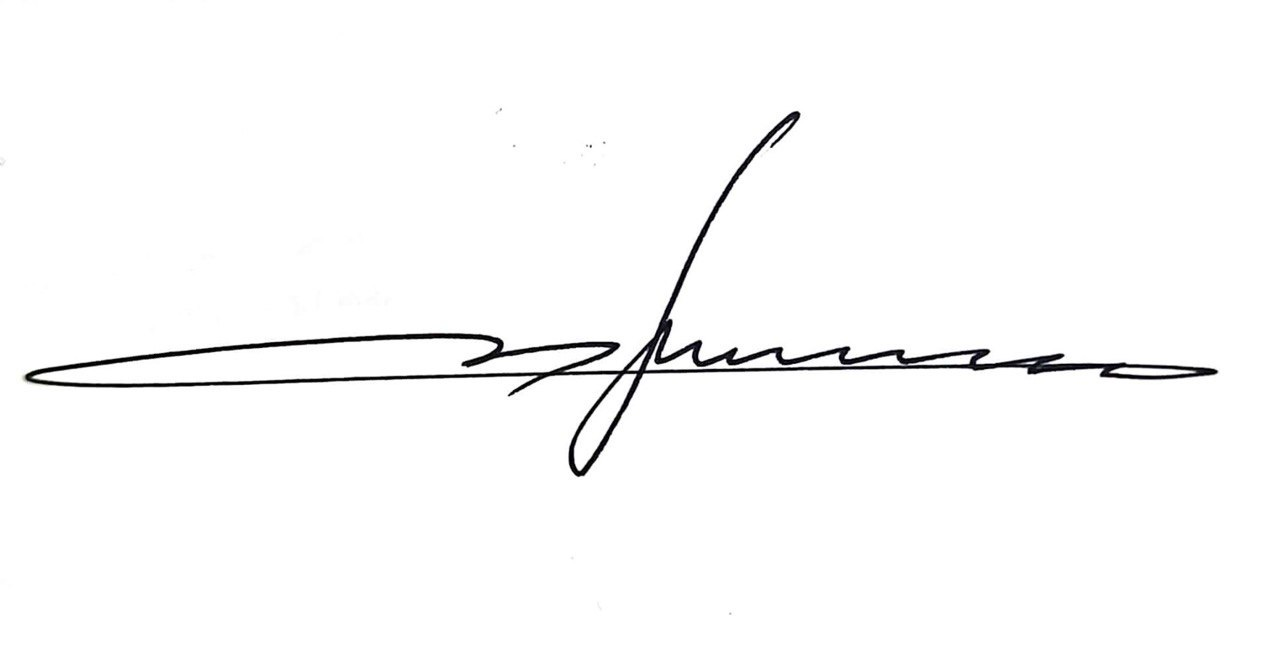
- Signature
- Website: avakov.com

Arsen Borysovych Avakov (Ukrainian: Арсен Борисович Аваков, IPA: [ɐrˈsɛn boˈrɪsowɪtʃ ɐwɐˈkɔu̯]; born 2 January 1964) is a Ukrainian politician who served as the Minister of Internal Affairs of Ukraine from 2014 to 2021. He was the Chairman of the Kharkiv Regional State Administration from 2005 to 2010, a member of the National Security and Defense Council of Ukraine from 2007 to 2008 and from 2014 to 2021 and a member of the Verkhovna Rada from 2012 to 2014. Outside politics, Avakov was a member of Euro 2012 Organizing Committee in 2007 and a member of the National Union of Journalists of Ukraine. He was awarded the Honored Economist of Ukraine in 2007.

== Biography ==
=== Origin ===
Avakov was born on 2 January 1964 in Kirov settlement (now Yeni Surahany), Baku to a military family.

He is of Armenian descent and of Armenian Apostolic faith.

Since 1966, he has been permanently residing in Ukraine and is a citizen of Ukraine.

=== Education and career ===
In 1988 he graduated from the Kharkiv Polytechnic Institute with a degree in Automated Control Systems, qualification – systems engineer.

In 1990, he founded and headed JSC “Investor” (he was president until 2005). In 1992 he founded the commercial bank “Basis”.

During the 2004 presidential campaign, he was deputy head of the Kharkiv headquarters of the presidential candidate Viktor Yushchenko and the first deputy chairman of the Kharkiv regional “Committee of National Salvation”.

=== Head of the Kharkiv region ===
On 4 February 2005, by decree of the President of Ukraine, he was appointed to the position of Chairman of the Kharkiv Regional State Administration. After his appointment, he resigned as Chairman of the Supervisory Board of JSC “Investor” and JSCB “Basis”.

On 9 February 2010, two days after Viktor Yanukovych's victory in the presidential election, Avakov resigned from the post of Chairman of the Kharkiv Regional State Administration under Part 3 of Article 31 of the Law of Ukraine on Civil Service: “principled disagreement with the decision of a state body or official, as well as ethical obstacles to staying in public service”.

=== 2010–2013 ===
On 21 April 2010, he joined the “Batkivshchyna” political party and accepted the offer from Yulia Tymoshenko to head the regional organization of “Batkivshchyna”. He is a member of the political council of the party. In October 2010, he ran for the position of Kharkiv mayor, and together with a representative of CPU Alla Aleksandrovska was one of the main rivals of the acting mayor and the candidate from “Party of Regions” Hennadiy Kernes. After processing 100 per cent of the protocols, Kernes became the winner (30.09% of the vote), and Arsen Avakov scored 29.46%. The elections themselves and the vote-counting procedure were held in a scandalous atmosphere with numerous violations. According to Freedom House, there is evidence that as a result of mass violations, the election result was changed in favour of Hennadiy Kernes.

Since the autumn of 2011, Avakov has been in Europe on the affairs of his own foundation, in particular, promoting the film “Armenian Heritage of Europe”.

Until December 2012, he was in political exile in Italy due to criminal prosecution in Ukraine.

According to the results of the autumn parliamentary elections of 2012, he was elected a Member of the Parliament of Ukraine on the lists of the united opposition “Batkivshchyna” Party. During the Revolution of Dignity, he was one of the commandants of Euromaidan, and dealt with the infrastructure of the protest camp: barricades, a tent city, and food supplies.

=== Minister of Internal Affairs ===
On 21 February 2014, the Verkhovna Rada of Ukraine appointed Arsen Avakov as Acting Minister, and on 27 February it approved Arsen Avakov as Minister of Internal Affairs of Ukraine.

Immediately after his appointment, Arsen Avakov stated that the leadership of the Ministry of Internal Affairs of Ukraine for the first time in the history of Ukraine will include representatives of the “Right Sector” and the Maidan Self-Defense.

Following the results of 100 days of work as a minister, among his main achievements, Avakov mentioned the prevention of a separatist scenario in Kharkiv; the restoration of the National Guard; and the successful work of the police during the 2014 presidential election.

==== Events in Kharkiv ====
On the night of 7 April 2014, Avakov personally led the assault operation on the building of the Kharkiv Regional State Administration, which had been seized by separatists and militants who came from Belgorod the day before.

The assault was carried out as part of the anti-terrorist operation in Kharkiv and the Kharkiv Oblast.

In Kharkiv on 6 April, well-managed groups of supporters of the "Russian world", specially trained by militants and managed by specialists from Russia, surrounded the building of the regional state administration and the adjacent quarter. They appointed some "alternative members" of the regional council from the crowd, held an "alternative session" right on the steps of the Regional State Administration, and proclaimed the "Kharkiv People's Republic". On the afternoon of April 7, "peacefully protesting citizens" wounded a cadet from the law enforcement lines, a boy at all. They shoved a grenade behind his bulletproof vest, which exploded. The flash-bang grenade turned half of his lungs. The cadet was saved by doctors ... And it all accumulated, accumulated, the city center boiled like a kettle ... On 7 April, I arrived in Kharkiv, clearly realizing that the next couple of days would be decisive and I needed to concentrate all my strength and will. Stabilization in Kharkiv was vital, critically necessary for the whole of Ukraine.

— Arsen Avakov, "2014. Moments of Kharkiv Spring"

The special operation to liberate the Kharkiv Regional State Administration was carried out by the special forces unit “Jaguar” (from Vinnytsia city) of the Ministry of Internal Affairs under the direct supervision of the Minister of Internal Affairs of Ukraine Arsen Avakov and the operational management of the commander of the National Guard of Ukraine Stepan Poltorak.

The special operation was carried out entirely within the framework of legislative norms: the day before, a decree was signed by Acting President Oleksandr Turchynov “On conducting an anti-terrorist operation on the territory of Kharkiv and the Kharkiv Oblast”. On the basis of the Decree, a corresponding order was issued to conduct a special operation by the regional department of the Security Service of Ukraine (SSU), since anti-terrorist activities are the area of responsibility of the SSU.

Before the start of the assault, the Kharkiv metro was stopped, and the city center was cordoned off by local police and cadets of the National Guard Military Academy of Ukraine and the University of the Ministry of Internal Affairs. The invaders were warned over the loudspeaker about the start of the operation and their rights were read out. The operation in the building of the Kharkiv Regional State Administration lasted 17 minutes. Firearms did not have to be used. As a result of the operation, 67 people were detained.

In 2020, Avakov published a book about the events in Kharkiv “2014. Moments of the Kharkiv Spring”, where he added a unique document – “Plan for Kharkiv and the Kharkiv Region”, the plan of the separatists to seize the Kharkiv Oblast and further plans to seize the eastern regions of Ukraine.

==== Poroshenko's presidency ====
On 29 July 2014, Avakov announced the Ministry’s plans to replace about 20,000 police officers in the Luhansk and Donetsk regions who had discredited themselves during the events of 2014 in these regions.

On 26 August, Arsen Avakov announced the creation of a new Political party - the “People's Front”. On September 10, he joined the military council of this party.

On 22 October, the Cabinet of Ministers approved the Concept and Strategy for Reforming the Ministry of Internal Affairs.

In addition, 15,000 policemen in the Donetsk and Luhansk regions, who remained in the territories controlled by the armed formations of the DPR and LPR, were dismissed from the Ministry of Internal Affairs and deprived of social guarantees.

On 9 October 2014, Avakov announced the beginning of lustration in his Ministry after the entry into force of the relevant law, which was signed the day before by the President of Ukraine Petro Poroshenko, By the end of October, 91 employees were dismissed (among those dismissed were the heads of regional police departments in Kyiv, Donetsk, Chernihiv, Ternopil, Khmelnytskyi, Poltava regions, the leadership of the Department of the Security Service and traffic police units, as well as 8 generals).

On 11 November 2014, Arsen Avakov published the documents on the reform of the Ministry of Internal Affairs of Ukraine, as well as the composition of the expert council and consultants who, together with the Ministry of Internal Affairs, developed a reform strategy.

On 2 December 2014, a coalition in the Verkhovna Rada formed by “Petro Poroshenko Bloc”, “People's Front”, “Self Reliance” (Samopomich), “Radical Party of Oleh Liashko” and “Batkivshchyna” (Motherland) created a draft of a new government, where Arsen Avakov retained the post of head of the Ministry of Internal Affairs of Ukraine. The Verkhovna Rada adopted this composition of the government with 288 votes. According to the legislation, the parliament prematurely dismissed 4 MPs, elected from the People's Front party: Arseniy Yatsenyuk, Arsen Avakov, Vyacheslav Kyrylenko, and Pavlo Petrenko.

After the resignation of the second government of Yatsenyuk on 14 April 2016, and the formation of a new government headed by Volodymyr Groysman, Arsen Avakov retained the post of Minister of Internal Affairs of Ukraine.

On 1 October 2017, Anton Gerashchenko, a former adviser to Avakov, said that there had been a conflict between the head of the Ministry of Internal Affairs and Petro Poroshenko since the latter's election as president of Ukraine in 2014. According to Gerashchenko, Avakov considers Poroshenko's desire to "concentrate all power over law enforcement agencies in his hands" to be a "dangerous precedent".

==== The Markiv’s case ====
On 30 June 2017, Vitalii Markiv, senior sergeant, squad commander of the Kulchitsky battalion (military unit 3066) of the National Guard of Ukraine, was detained in Italy on suspicion of involvement in the death of photojournalist Andrea Rocchelli and Russian citizen Andrei Mironov in the city of Sloviansk in May 2014.

Immediately after the arrest of Markiv, Arsen Avakov declared the innocence of the National Guardsman, the bias of the court, and the use of fake evidence falsified by Russia. Avakov initiated the National Police of Ukraine's own investigation, during which a number of investigative actions were carried out and evidence was obtained of the innocence of the National Guardsman Vitalii Markiv in the death of the Italian photojournalist Andrea Rocchelli and Russian national Andrei Mironov in 2014.

Throughout the trial of the Markiv case from 2017 to 2020, Minister Avakov supervised its progress, repeatedly met with representatives of the Italian embassy, facilitated the work of lawyers (according to some sources, paid for their services), and attended all court hearings in the cities of Pavia and Milan.

Avakov was also present at the meeting of the Milan Court of Appeal, which dropped all charges against Vitalii Markiv. At the end of the final meeting, Avakov initiated the immediate release of Markiv from prison and on the same evening organized his flight to Kyiv on a charter flight, which he paid for. From the first day of Markiv's detention on 30 June 2017, until his release on 3 November 2020, Minister Avakov took a consistent position – the state is obliged to protect its citizen, who has become an instrument of the hybrid war of the Russian Federation against Ukraine, using all its institutions, diplomatic tools and work with the Ukrainian diaspora in Italy. His slogan "We will not leave our soldier behind" became a meme on the Internet, and banners in defense of Markiv were placed on the building of the Ministry of Internal Affairs of Ukraine, all regional departments of the National Police of Ukraine, including one on the Sophia Square, the main square of Kyiv, and even during football matches.

==== Zelenskyy's presidency ====
Arsen Avakov was reappointed to his previous position at the suggestion of Ukrainian president Volodymyr Zelenskyy. He was approved in the new composition of the Cabinet of Ministers of Ukraine on 29 August 2019, at the first meeting of the Verkhovna Rada of the IX convocation, elected in early elections on 21 July 2019. By that time, he remained the only minister who was appointed after the change of power in Ukraine in 2014 and did not lose his post.

The presidential administration was unhappy with Avakov's influence. In 2019, Zelenskyy tried to remove the National Guard from the subordination of the Ministry of Internal Affairs. A corresponding bill was even submitted to the Rada, but Avakov resolutely opposed such a decision, motivating his position by the fact that the withdrawal of NGU from the ministry would cast doubt on the further service of volunteer guardsmen, complicate interaction with the police, and also create problems in the budgeting process and management. After a meeting with President Zelenskyy, the corresponding bill was withdrawn from the Verkhovna Rada.

In March 2020, Avakov joined the new government of Denys Shmyhal, who replaced Prime Minister Oleksiy Honcharuk.

On 13 July 2021, Arsen Avakov wrote a letter of resignation, which was satisfied by the Verkhovna Rada of Ukraine on 15 July 2021.

After the dismissal of Avakov and the appointment of Denys Monastyrsky to his post, all control over the power bloc passed to Zelenskyy's team.

=== The outcome of work ===
Avakov was the Minister of Internal Affairs of Ukraine from 24 February 2014 to 15 July 2021, under acting President Oleksandr Turchynov, two presidents of Ukraine: Petro Poroshenko and Volodymyr Zelenskyy. He was a member of five compositions of the Cabinet of Ministers of Ukraine: two governments of Arseniy Yatsenyuk, governments of Volodymyr Groysman, Oleksiy Honcharuk, Denys Shmyhal. His term lasted 7 years, 4 months, and 21 days - the longest term of work in the government in the history of independent Ukraine.

==== Reform of the Ministry of Internal Affairs ====
Avakov radically reformed the system of the Ministry of Internal Affairs of Ukraine, and as a result, the agency became the leading body in the system of central executive bodies on the formation and implementation of state policy in the field of protecting the rights and freedoms of citizens, the interests of society and the state from illegal encroachments, combating crime, protecting public order, ensuring public safety, road safety, protection and defense of important state facilities. Ministry coordinated the work of the National Police, the State Border Guard Service, the State Emergency Service, the National Guard, and the State Migration Service.

Under the leadership of Avakov, lustration and large-scale re-certification of police officers were carried out in the system of the Ministry of Internal Affairs.

On 23 September 2014, it was announced that in the course of the reform of the Ministry of Internal Affairs, the militia would be transformed into the “National Police”, and the Main Anti-Organized Crime Directorate (GUBOP), Transport and Veterinary Police “will be excluded from the structures of the Ministry of Internal Affairs”. In October 2014, Interior Minister Arsen Avakov confirmed that the reform would eliminate the Main Anti-Organized Crime Directorate, the Transport, and Veterinary Police “and a number of other units”.

On 7 November 2015, the Law of Ukraine “On the National Police” came into force, which put an end to the existence of the old Soviet militia system. The National Police also included the Patrol Police of Ukraine, created on the initiative of Avakov, which was fully formed from young (up to 36 years old) people who passed a transparent selection: computer testing, physical fitness tests, a military medical commission, and a commission interview. The training included both the acquisition of theoretical knowledge and the mastery of the practical skills necessary for the service. Therefore, professional instructors and trainers were involved in the training process of future patrolmen. Partners from Georgia, the United States, and Canada also actively assisted in the training of new patrolmen.

==== Creation of the National Guard of Ukraine and Volunteer Battalions ====
In March 2014, on the initiative of Acting President Oleksandr Turchynov and Minister of Internal Affairs of Ukraine Arsen Avakov, the National Guard of Ukraine was created on the basis of the Internal Troops of the Ministry of Internal Affairs of Ukraine and Maidan Self-Defense Volunteers.

The First Reserve Battalion of the newly created National Guard (now the Operational Battalion named after the Hero of Ukraine, General Kulchytskyi of the National Guard of Ukraine, as part of military unit 3066 (Kyiv), formed from the 1st and 2nd reserve battalions of the National Guard of Ukraine) took the oath of office on 5 April 2014, and on 15 April 2014 was sent to the Sloviansk region (Donetsk Oblast) to repel military aggression by separatists and Russian militants. The first commander of the National Guard of Ukraine was Colonel-General Stepan Poltorak.

Another initiative of Arsen Avakov, which had a significant impact on the fact that the separatist pro-Russian movement was localized in eastern Ukraine and prevented the situation from being shaken throughout the country, was the creation of volunteer battalions (the Dobrobats) under the auspices of the Ministry of Internal Affairs, in which volunteers were accepted under a simplified procedure. 35 such units participated in the fight against pro-Russian separatists in the Donbas in the spring of 2014.

The most famous of them, in addition to the Operational Battalion named after Hero of Ukraine, General Kulchytskyi of the National Guard of Ukraine, were Azov, Donbas, Dnipro-1. The Azov Battalion (now a special purpose regiment of the National Guard of Ukraine) played a decisive role in liberating Mariupol from separatists during 6 May–13 June 2014. During the 2022 Russian invasion in Ukraine, Azov, together with border guards and servicemen of the 36th Separate Marine Brigade of the Navy regiment of the Armed Forces of Ukraine, took part in the defense of besieged Mariupol and the confrontation in Azovstal. On 20 May, on the 86th day of the blockade of Mariupol, the remnants of the garrison, complied with the leadership of the Armed Forces of Ukraine and stopped resisting and surrendered to Russian troops.

Volunteer battalions played a huge role in the first months of the hot phase of the war in Donbas in 2014. In many ways, it was thanks to the Volunteer Battalions that it was possible to stop the offensive of separatists and Russian mercenaries and preserve the territorial integrity and sovereignty of Ukraine in 2014-2021. Since the autumn of 2014, all Volunteer Battalions have been integrated into the structures of the National Guard or the Armed Forces of Ukraine.

==== Biometric passports for visa-free travel with the EU ====
From the very beginning of his term, Avakov initiated the efforts of the Ministry of Internal Affairs to introduce biometric passports, which was one of the necessary conditions for the introduction of a visa-free regime between Ukraine and the European Union. The Resolution of the Cabinet of Ministers of Ukraine of 7 May 2014 approved the sample form, technical description and procedure for issuing a passport of a citizen of Ukraine for travelling abroad. The first passports were issued in January 2015.

In 2019, Avakov's Ministry introduced the first options for a mobile application Diia – Ukrainian electronic service of public services, developed by Ministry of Digital Transformation of Ukraine. The first digital documents to be accessed through the Diya application were Driver's license and Vehicle registration certificate. In 2020, electronic versions of ID-cards and biometric passports “For traveling abroad” became available in the Diia application.

==== Aviation security system ====
In 2018, under the supervision of Avakov, a joint Ukrainian-French project was prepared to create a unified system of aviation security and civil protection in Ukraine.

On 23 May 2018, the Minister of Internal Affairs of Ukraine Arsen Avakov on behalf of the Government of Ukraine and the Secretary of State of the Ministry of Economy and Finance of France Delphine Gény-Stephann signed an intergovernmental agreement on behalf of the Government of France. As part of the agreement, the French government provided Ukraine with 55 modern Airbus Helicopters of the H125, H225 Super Puma and H145 models for a total of 551 million euros. Ukraine received these funds through an extremely friendly procedure – a special borrowing at 4.25% per annum from the State Treasury of France and a consortium of French banks. The main tasks of the aviation security system of the Ministry of Internal Affairs of Ukraine were: aeromedical evacuation, rescue operations, maintenance of public order, anti-terrorist and special operations, protection of the state border and road safety. All helicopters are multifunctional and, if necessary, they can be used to solve each of the tasks. On 7 June 2018, the Verkhovna Rada of Ukraine ratified an agreement with France on the purchase of 55 French helicopters for the Ministry of Internal Affairs of Ukraine.

==== Ensuring a fair and transparent electoral process ====
During Avakov's tenure as Minister of Internal Affairs of Ukraine during election campaigns, the police consistently took an equidistant, neutral position from all candidates and political forces. In particular, in 2019, during the election campaign for the presidential elections in Ukraine, Avakov ensured the first fully fair and transparent elections in Ukraine. On the eve of the campaign, the minister stated the position of the Ministry: the police will behave as an independent state institution, will not participate in political processes and will have all the forces and means to suppress illegal agitation schemes.

Also, for the first time, within the framework of cooperation with the OPORA Civil Network, trainings were held for prevention police officers and investigators of the National Police of Ukraine to identify and suppress violations of election campaigning. According to the statement of the Chairman of the Board of the All-Ukrainian Public Organization Civic Network "OPORA" Olha Aivazovska, an expert on electoral legislation and political processes, it was the only election campaign in her memory during which "the Ministry of Internal Affairs was not part of the electoral strategy of one of the candidates”. The Ministry of Internal Affairs and the National Police of Ukraine, on the initiative of Avakov, took the same strategy during the election campaigns of the early elections of the Parliament of Ukraine on 21 July 2019 and local elections on 25 October 2019.

== Recognition ==
From 2014 to 2021, Arsen Avakov was included in the rating of "100 most influential Ukrainians" according to the magazine “Focus”, holding place in the top ten of the rating. So, in 2015, the journalists of the publication noted that “one of the producers of the police reform, the head of the Ministry of Internal Affairs Arsen Avakov, was in the public eye all year. In terms of media activity, of all the members of the Cabinet of Ministers, only the Prime Minister himself could compete with him. The main real achievement of Avakov is the beginning of reforms in the system of Internal Affairs bodies and the involvement of experienced professionals from Georgia in this process”.

In 2020, the Focus publication noted that “Arsen Avakov was called an "interim minister" in Zelensky's team, but already in December, Ukrainska Pravda assigned him the role of "political master Yoda under the young Jedi preZedent". And in the spring of this year, the situation changed so much that when one of the leaders of the presidential faction was asked if there was any fear that Avakov's political weight was growing every day, he replied: "How can you be afraid of what has already happened?".

=== Influence rating ===
According to the rating of the Focus magazine, 100 most influential Ukrainians:

- 2014 — No. 5;
- 2015 — No. 4;
- 2016 — No. 9;
- 2017 — No. 5;
- 2018 — No. 7;
- 2019 — No. 8;
- 2020 — No. 8;
- 2021 — No. 15.

According to the rating of the magazine New Voice, 100 most influential people of Ukraine:

- 2018 — No. 3;
- 2019 — No. 6;
- 2020 — No. 3;
- 2021 — No. 5.

== Social activities ==
Arsen Avakov is a co-founder of the Marianna Avakova Foundation. The Foundation provides assistance to orphanages, boarding schools, orphans. He is also the founder of the Arsen Avakov Production Foundation, the president of the Renaissance Charitable Foundation, which is engaged in holding charity events, concerts, auctions, restoration and revival of historical and architectural monuments, grant support for young scientists, scientific and scientific institutions. Programs, children's creativity, under the patronage of the Renaissance Charitable Foundation, a documentary film “Armenian Heritage of Europe” was shot — a cultural project to study the history of the development of Armenian communities in European countries, their impact on the development of these countries in almost all spheres of culture, science, art and technology. On November 11, 2011, the film was presented at the Armenian Cultural Center in The Hague (The Netherlands). One of the most famous was the project of the Renaissance Foundation for the restoration of the building of the Kharkiv Regional Philharmonic, which is an architectural monument, which included the restoration of the historical appearance of a large concert hall and the construction of a new modern organ hall and a new organ manufactured by Alexander Schuke (Potsdam).

Arsen Avakov is the co-chairman of the organizing committee of the International Festival of Science Fiction “Star Bridge”, which is engaged in holding the annual international festival of science fiction, publishing fantastic literature, social and educational activities in orphanages, schools, universities. In 2008–2010 he was the chairman of the Kharkiv regional branch of the National Olympic Committee.

== Personal fortune and business ==
According to the rating of the Focus magazine, in 2008 Avakov ranked 67th among the richest people in Ukraine.

By the beginning of the Orange Revolution, “Investor” JSC managed dozens of enterprises from various sectors of the economy. Among them are the oil and gas companies Investor-Neftegaz and Energia-95, CHPP-3 and the tea factory AHMAD TEA UKRAINE, the local supermarket chain Delight, the ATN television company, the developer Investor Elite Stroy, the Chichikov Hotel, the Saltovsky Bakery, 50% Channel 7 (the original brand PRAT RTMK TONIS-CENTER, Kharkiv), several radio stations. An Italian company “Investor” was engaged in the production of mozzarella. It also had its own bank “Basis”.

After going into politics, Avakov handed over the management of the business to partners and managers. Since 2010, Avakov's business has been subjected to raider attacks after he supported Yulia Tymoshenko, who lost to Viktor Yanukovych in the presidential election.

In the autumn of 2011, due to criminal prosecution, he left Ukraine, sold off his existing assets.

“During the two years that I spent in forced exile due to politically motivated criminal prosecution by the Yanukovych regime, my business was completely destroyed,” Avakov said in 2014.

Three years after the cancellation of the banking license of Basis, the court granted the claim, canceling the National Bank of Ukraine's decision on liquidation.

Since 2015, Avakov, as a civil servant, has submitted electronic declarations of his property and income, which are available on the National Agency on Corruption Prevention website.

After this, real estate assets that had been on the bank’s balance sheet were promptly withdrawn and sold off. According to estimates by journalists from Bihus.Info, the market value of the property ranged from 100 to 150 million hryvnias. It later emerged that the buyers were entities linked to Avakov’s business partners.

Officially, Avakov’s wife and son own three small solar power plants (SPPs) with capacities of 3–10 MW located in the Kyiv, Odesa, and Kherson regions; the ATN television company; the financial company Foresight; the Verona investment fund; as well as a 25% stake in the Holosiivskyi Hotel and the construction company Business Bill. At the same time, Ukrainian media attribute to Avakov control over a number of entities that he allegedly created through close associates. A significant role in managing these structures is played by his business partner Ihor Kotvytskyi, who is also referred to as “Avakov’s wallet.” These include companies involved in the extraction of natural gas, beryllium, lithium, uranium, and other natural resources. They also include the Artemivsk Distillery (24% stake), the Kiset tobacco shop chain (30%), the armored vehicle manufacturer Med Nomad (25% stake), the Chichikov Hotel in Kharkiv, and four solar power plants in the Mykolaiv and Cherkasy regions with capacities ranging from 2 to 23 MW , as well as Avakov’s alleged “consiglieri”. According to journalist and Member of Parliament Serhiy Leshchenko, the USD 40 million transferred by Kotvytskyi from Ukraine to offshore accounts in Panama partially or entirely belonged to Arsen Avakov.

Among Arsen Avakov’s closest business partners are his wife Inna and his son Oleksandr. Arsen Avakov and members of his family own several dozen companies and subsidiaries. Officially, Avakov’s 2015 electronic asset declaration lists 15 legal entities of which Arsen Avakov or Inna Avakova are the ultimate beneficial owners.

For 2016, Arsen Avakov declared, among other assets, 12 shares of the football club Metalist.

At the end of February 2018, media outlets reported that Avakov owned a 26-room villa in Italy with a total area of 566 m², located in San Felice Circeo (Lazio region) on the Mediterranean coast. According to registry records, the property was acquired through the company Avitalia S.R.L., 100% of which is owned by Arsen Avakov via its subsidiary Ferdico S.R.L. In an interview with Ukrainska Pravda, the Minister of Internal Affairs stated that the acquisition of the villa was one of his wife’s projects.

In March 2019, information emerged about Arsen Avakov’s acquisition of the online media outlet Bukvy.

In 2022, Avakov held a charity event “Turning wine into boots for the Armed Forces of Ukraine”, in which he sold his collection of wines collected in 2010-2011 at wine auctions, mainly in London and New York. The collection was kept in Avakov's apartment in Kharkiv and survived the bombing that damaged the house. As a result of the action, UAH 6,353,528 was collected. With the funds received, 2,500 pairs of tactical shoes for the military were purchased and transferred to the front lines.

In 2022–2023, at his own expense, he launched production of micropower plants and video monitoring systems for the needs of Army.

== Awards ==
- Honored Economist of Ukraine (22 June 2007) — for significant personal contribution to the development of the constitutional principles of Ukrainian statehood, many years of conscientious work, high professionalism and on the occasion of the Constitution Day of Ukraine;
- Order of Merit, III degree;
- The Order of the Legion of Honor (France) was presented on 9 June 2022 by the Ambassador, Extraordinary and Plenipotentiary, of France to Ukraine Etienne de Poncins on behalf of the President of France.

== Personal life ==
Avakov is married and has a son, named Oleksandr. At the age of 25, his son volunteered for the special police detachments Kyiv-1 Battalion in August 2014 and fought in the Siege of Sloviansk.

In August 2017 Avakov's wife Inna acquired 40% of Goldberry LLC, the owner of Espreso TV.

== Author's publications ==
Author of a number of publications (including scientific ones, and one collective monograph), in particular:

- Is Lenin with us? / Arsen Avakov – Kharkiv: Folio, 2017.

The article of the Ukrainian politician and well-known public figure Arsen Avakov "Lenin is with us" was published in the electronic media in 2007 and caused a great public outcry and heated discussion on the Internet. Therefore, the 2008 edition of the book "Lenin is with Us" included not only an article, but also a selection of comments and discussions in various electronic media - one might say, "Internet epistolary", a public answer to the question of the relevance and necessity of decommunization and liberation from the myths and idols of Soviet propaganda. Ten years later, the author returns to the topic again, adding a question mark to the title. After Revolution of Dignity, the era of “Leninfall” and The Law on Decommunization the reader gets the opportunity to recall direct quotes from the leader and ideologist of communism in the USSRx

The book also includes official statistics from the "Institute of National Remembrance of Ukraine" regarding the dismantling of monuments to Lenin. The collection concludes with a selection of arguments and responses from well-known Ukrainian politicians, public figures and publicists.

The new, expanded edition of Arsen Avakov's book "Is Lenin with Us?" continues the broad public discussion that is relevant and absolutely necessary for building a mature democracy.

- Green Notebook / Arsen Avakov – Kharkiv: Folio, 2018.

A selection of articles, essays and publications in the press and Fb by Arsen Avakov. The book covers one of the most difficult periods in the modern history of Ukraine: from January 1, 2014 to autumn 2017. Sometimes these are abstract texts, sometimes reflection or emotions in response to the flow of events of that period. Years – from Euromaidan, the victory of the Revolution of Dignity to the present day - through the despair and impotence of the annexation of Crimea, the capture of part of the Donbas, war, grief and valor... Through the formation of emotions of the next period of the historical struggle for independence, national identity, through the great daily work of launching a global state reform.

Each publication of the collection is preceded by a chronicle of the day when it was published – sometimes it suggests the background of the post, its mood, sometimes not – but it always allows the reader to build his temporary reminiscences to this difficult time.

- 2014. Moments of Kharkiv Spring / Arsen Avakov – Kharkiv: Folio, 2020.

One night in the spring of the 2014, Kharkiv was from the tragic fate of Donetsk, Luhansk, many cities and villages within Donbas, which have been under siege by Russian mercenaries for several years, received their first victory in the war waged against Ukraine by Vladimir Putin. Arsen Avakov discusses the events that transpired between April 7-April 8, 2014 in Kharkiv. Arsen Avalon and his co-author are both residents of Kharkiv, and share their perspectives of the events during this time. This book also features audio recordings and documentation obtained by the Ministry of Internal Affairs regarding the criminal cases made against the leaders of the DPR. This book provides a history of events through both objective data such as documents, news broadcasts, and audio files, as well as the authors’ personal accounts and experiences. It also includes the philosophical views of the author about the events in Kharkiv, and its impact on the citizens of Ukraine.

=== Publications ===
- Promissory note circulation: theory and practice / A. B. Avakov, G. I. Gaevoy, V. A. Beshanov et al. — Kh.: Folio, 2000. — 382 p.;
- Highlights: Collection of articles (April 2005 - October 2006) / Arsen Avakov. — Kharkov, 2006. — 48 p.: ill.;
- Accents: Speeches, articles, speeches, interviews, publications (November 2004 - December 2006): collection of articles / Arsen Avakov. — Kharkov: Golden Pages, 2007. — 464 p.: ill.;
- Lenin with us: Article + Internet epistolary / Arsen Avakov. — Kharkov: Golden Pages, 2008. — 100 p.: ill.;
- Yesterday and Tomorrow/ Arsen Avakov. — Kharkov: Golden Pages, 2008. — 48 p.;
- Strategy of socio-economic development of the Kharkiv region for the period up to 2015: Monograph.- Kh.: Publishing House "INGEK", 2008.- 352 p.;
- Is Lenin with us? / Arsen Avakov – Kharkov: Folio, 2017. – 160 p.;
- Green Notebook / Arsen Avakov – Kharkov: Folio, 2018. – 160 p.;
- 2014. Moments of Kharkov Spring / Arsen Avakov – Kharkov: Folio, 2020. – 288 p.

== Notes ==
Political offices
Preceded by Stepan Maselsky	Governor of Kharkiv Oblast; 2005–2010	Succeeded by Volodymyr Babayev
Preceded by Vitaliy Zakharchenko	Minister of Internal Affairs; 2014–2021	Succeeded by Denys Monastyrsky
