= Yalta European Strategy =

Ukrainian think tank and conference

- Founded: July 2004; 22 years ago
- Founder: Victor Pinchuk
- Purpose: European future of Ukraine and global context
- Location: Kyiv, Ukraine
- Region served: Worldwide
- Services: Conference and network for decision-makers
- Website: yes-ukraine.org

Yalta European Strategy (YES; Ukrainian: Ялтинська європейська стратегія) is an international annual conference of leaders from politics, business, mass media, civil society and the expert community that has been held in Ukraine since 2004. The forum gathers more than 350 participants from over 50 countries around the world. The organisers describe YES as an independent philanthropic initiative that promotes Ukraine's European integration and raises the country's international profile, and the conference is regularly attended by sitting Ukrainian heads of state and senior Western figures; it is often called the "Ukrainian Davos".

== History ==
YES Summits have taken place annually since 2004. The summits were attended by Volodymyr Zelenskyy, Bill and Hillary Clinton, Condoleezza Rice, Boris Johnson, Tony Blair, Alexander Kwasniewski, Carl Bildt, Dominique Strauss-Kahn, Shimon Peres, Richard Branson, Anders Åslund, Timothy Snyder, Fareed Zakaria, Francis Fukuyama, Jimmy Wales and many others.

YES annual meetings were held at the Livadia Palace, where, in 1945, the historic Yalta Conference dedicated to peace settlement after World War II took place.

Since the 11th annual meeting, which took place on September 12, 2014, in connection with the annexation of Crimea by the Russian Federation, YES has been held in Kyiv. In September 2023, among speakers were Volodymyr Zelenskyy.

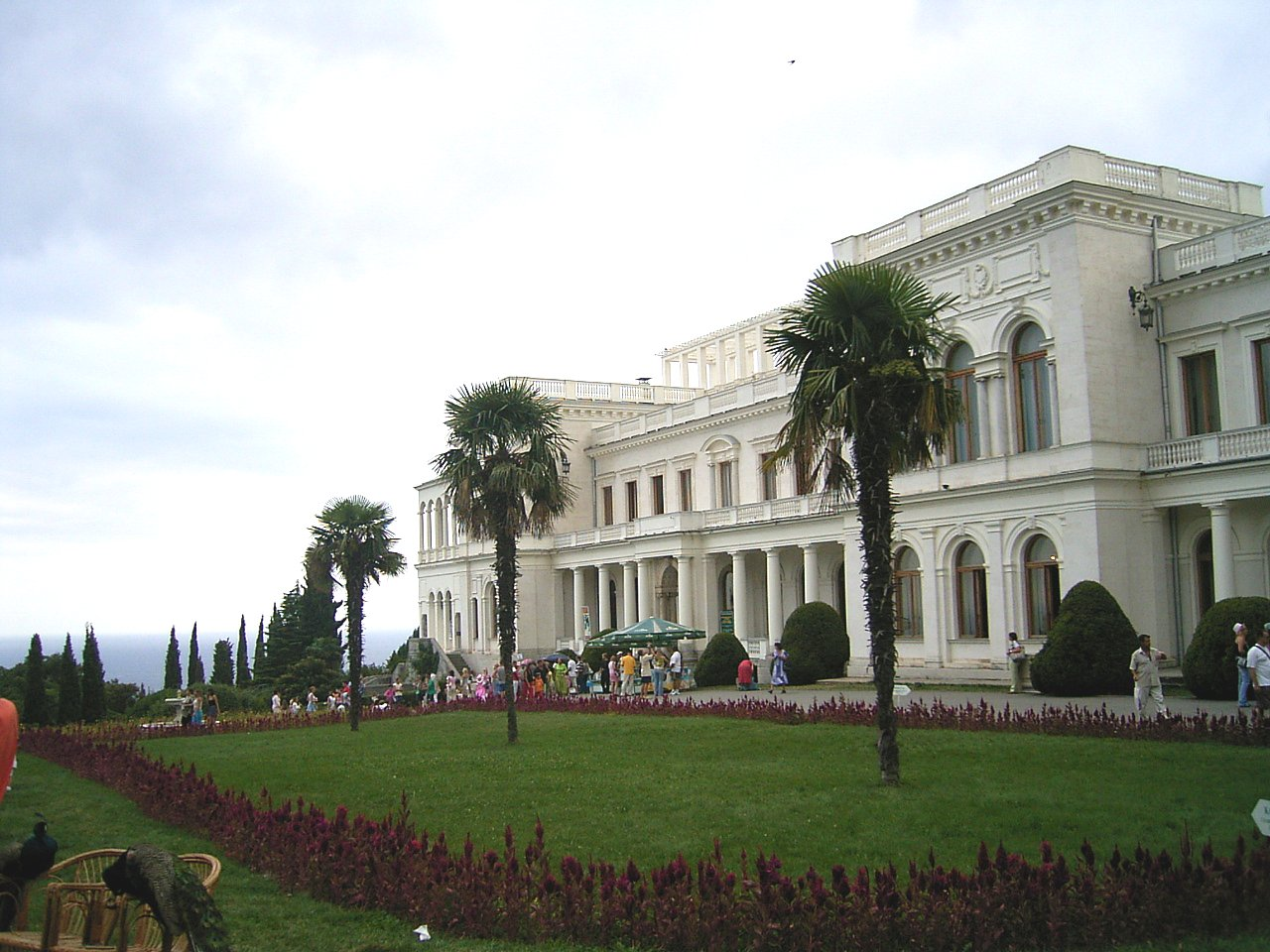
Livadia Palace near Yalta, Crimea, Ukraine

== Chronology of meetings ==
2004 – Ukrainian businessman and oligarch Victor Pinchuk gathered about 30 European leaders at the first Yalta European Seminar to discuss the prospects for Ukraine's accession to the EU. Following the seminar, an independent non-profit foundation, the Yalta European Strategy (YES), was established in Ukraine.

2005–2013 – The Yalta Annual Meeting focused on the success factors that create strong, competitive, sustainable and equitable countries and societies. Topics included the global economy, energy security, threats and innovations changing our lives, and successful approaches to leadership. Particular attention was paid to the future of Greater Europe and the prospects for cooperation and integration of Ukraine.

The 10th Yalta annual meeting was held in 2013 under the slogan "Ukraine and the world in the era of change: success factors". More than 250 leading representatives of political, business and public circles from more than 20 countries of the world were presented at the forum, who discussed the main global challenges and their impact on Ukraine, Greater Europe and the world.

2014 – Held on September 11–13 in Kyiv.

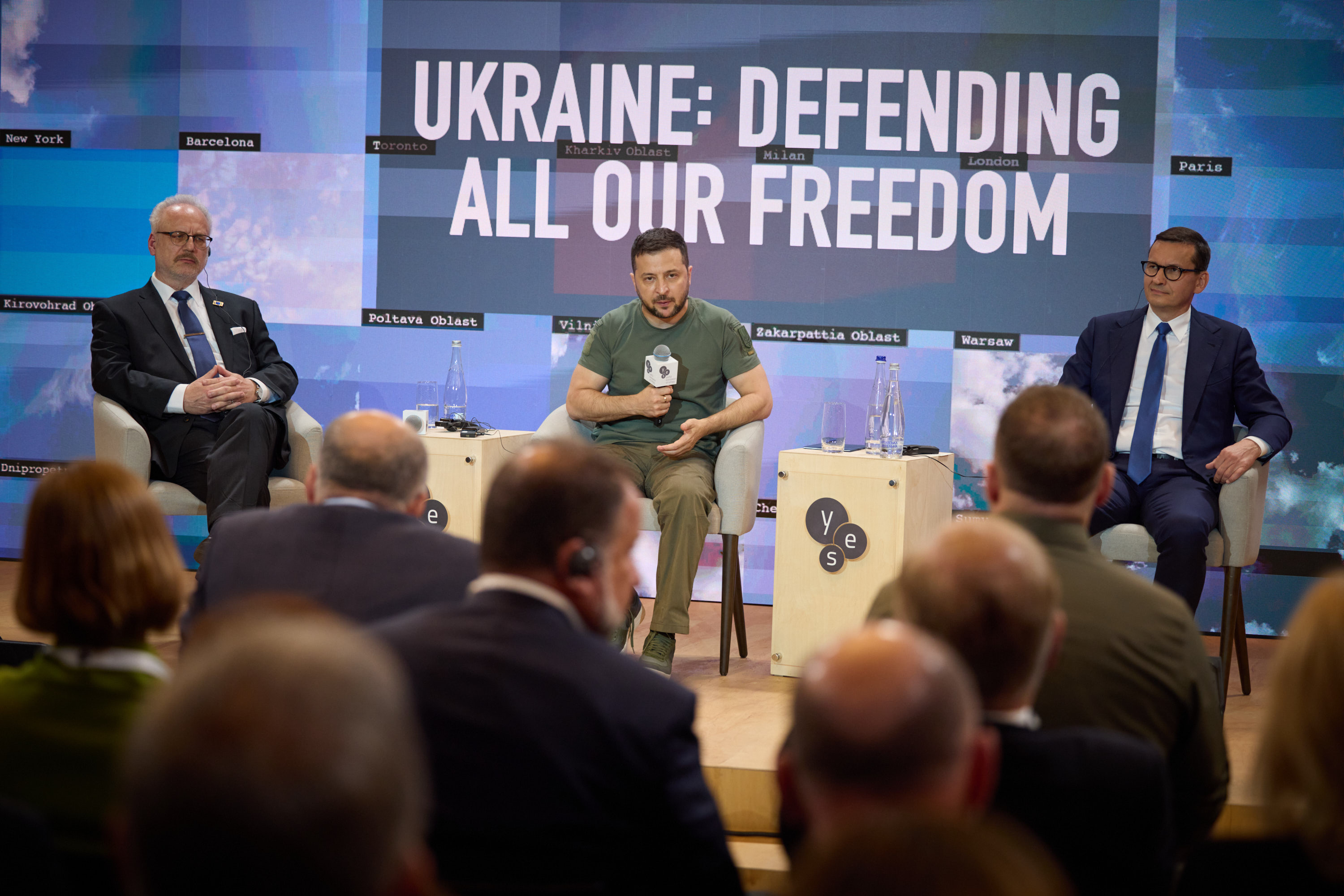
Leaders of Latvia, Ukraine and Poland at YES 2022: Egils Levits, Volodymyr Zelenskyy and Mateusz Morawiecki

2015 – Held on September 10–12, 2015 in Mystetskyi Arsenal under the slogan "At risk: How the fate of the new Ukraine affects Europe and the world".

2016 – Held under the slogan "World, Europe and Ukraine: storms of change".

2017 – It was held under the slogan "Has the world become new? And what does this mean for Ukraine?".

2018 – Held under the slogan "The Future Generation of Everything".

2019 – Held under the slogan "Happiness now. New approaches for a world in crisis".

2020 – Due to the COVID-19 pandemic, the YES annual meeting did not take place.

2021 – Held on September 9–11 under the slogan "After COVID = Before the disaster? Steps to survival".

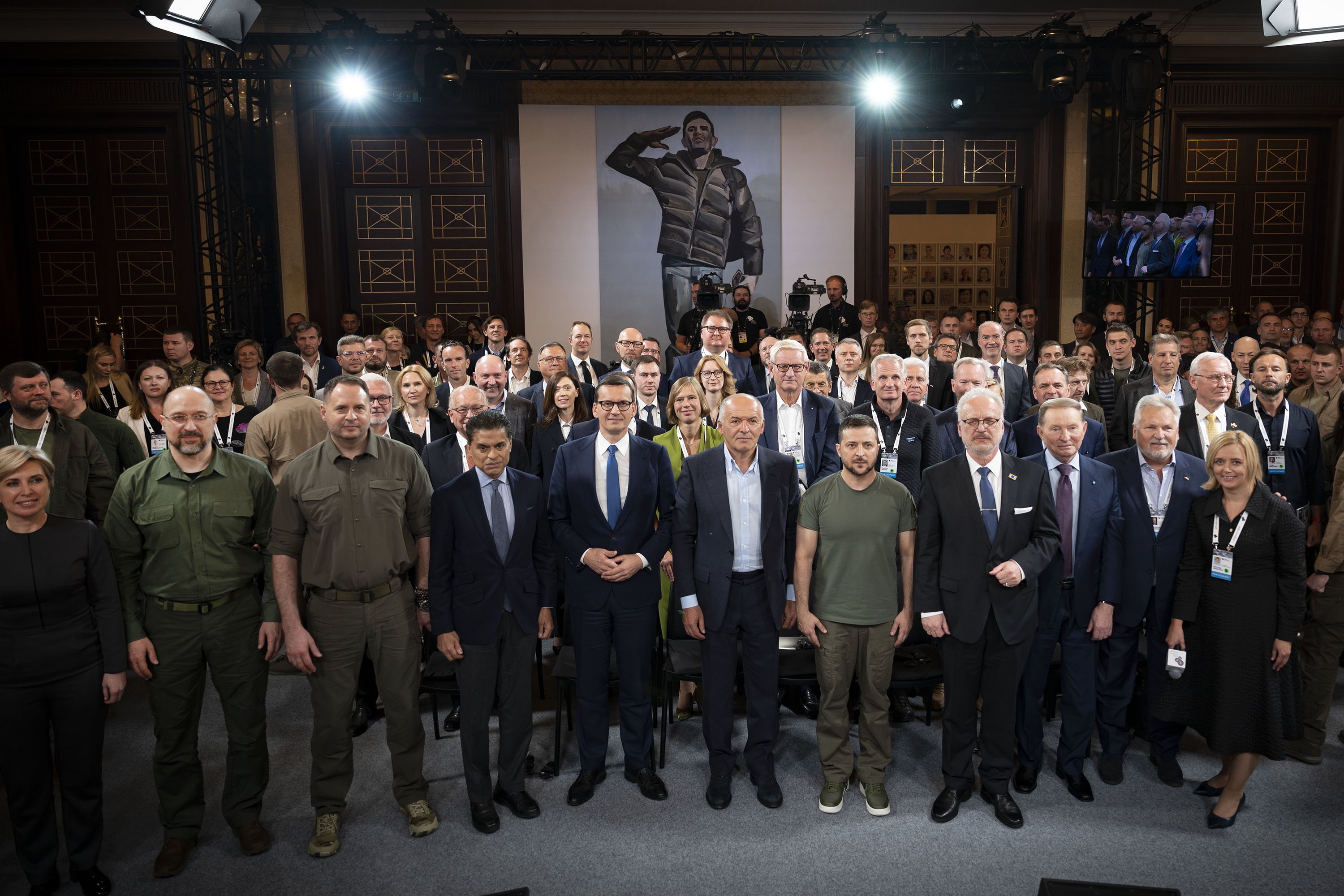
Participations of the YES 2022

2022 – Held on September 9–10 under the slogan "Ukraine: Defending all Our Freedom". Among the conference speakers were: Volodymyr and Olena Zelenska, Dmytro Kuleba, Polish Prime Minister Mateusz Morawiecki, Latvian President Egils Levits, Radoslaw Sikorski, Alexander Kwasniewski, ex-CEO of Google Eric Schmidt, former Supreme Allied Commander Europe of NATO Wesley Clark.

2023 – Held on September 8–9 under the slogan "YES war room. The Future is Being Decided in Ukraine". More than 500 leading politicians, diplomats, businessmen, public activists and experts from 29 countries of the world gathered at the YES conference. Among the participants are Volodymyr and Olena Zelenska, Chief of Military Intelligence of Ukraine Kyrylo Budanov, Boris Johnson, Victoria Nuland, Francis Fukuyama, Timothy Snyder.

The 20th event was held in Kyiv, in 2024. In 2024, among speakers at the event were Kyrylo Budanov, Ukrain's military intelligence chief. 2024 — The 20th Annual Meeting – THE NECESSITY TO WIN — was held on September 13 – 14, 2024 in Kyiv. Over 700 leading politicians, diplomats, businessmen, servicemen of the armed forces of Ukraine, veterans, civil activists, and experts, from more than 30 countries, took part.

In 2025, attendees included Deputy Prime Minister Radosław Sikorski. Among speakers were Zelensky and US Envoy Keith Kellogg. Other panelists included US Representative Jimmy Panetta.

At the special meeting the 2026 Yalta European Strategy event in Kyiv, among speakers were former UK Prime Minister Boris Johnson, and Yevhen Lasiychuk, an officer in the Ukrainian army. Other attendees included U.S. Special Envoy Steve Witkoff.

== Criticism and controversies ==
Yalta European Strategy was founded, funded and chaired by the Ukrainian businessman Victor Pinchuk, and the relationship between the forum and Pinchuk's wider activities has drawn recurring criticism from Ukrainian anti-corruption activists, journalists and politicians. Much of this criticism holds that the conference, together with other projects of the Victor Pinchuk Foundation, functions in part as a means of improving the public reputation of Pinchuk, who built his fortune during the presidency of his father-in-law, Leonid Kuchma—rather than solely as a policy forum.

=== Boycotts and reputation criticism ===
Calls to boycott the conference date to at least 2014, when the independent member of parliament Hanna Hopko, then chair of the Verkhovna Rada Committee on Foreign Affairs, wrote to YES board chairman and former Polish president Aleksander Kwaśniewski declining to take part and criticising the event. Ahead of the 15th annual meeting in September 2018, several prominent civil-society figures publicly announced that they would not attend, among them Daria Kaleniuk, executive director of the Anti-Corruption Action Center, and Alyona Getmanchuk, director of the New Europe Center.

Kaleniuk argued that there was little difference between the laundering of illicitly obtained money and the laundering of a tarnished reputation, and said that, whatever the quality of its discussions, the forum was also used for Pinchuk's personal public relations. Getmanchuk contended that oligarchic interests did not always align with Ukraine's state interests, and that Western politicians who attended such events undercut their own calls for de-oligarchisation by lending the gatherings legitimacy. Hopko described the forum as a platform serving to "clean up" the image of Pinchuk and the Kuchma family and called on the president and government to create an alternative venue for discussing security, foreign-policy and innovation issues. Declining to attend the 2019 meeting, Kaleniuk stated that she did not wish to legitimise Pinchuk because she did not believe in "good oligarchs".

Critics also objected to the payment of honorariums to prominent foreign politicians and entertainers to appear at the event, which detractors characterised as a billionaire's "vanity fair". The Kyiv Post, which had initially boycotted YES, later reversed its position and became a media partner of the conference; its chief editor Brian Bonner said the paper was aware of the controversies surrounding Pinchuk and Kuchma but considered the event newsworthy and that Pinchuk had sought an editorially independent partner.

=== 2016 Wall Street Journal op-ed ===
In a December 2016 op-ed in The Wall Street Journal, Pinchuk argued that Ukraine should make "painful compromises" for peace with Russia, including holding local elections in the Russian-occupied parts of Donetsk and Luhansk oblasts and not allowing the status of Crimea to block a settlement. The article prompted a backlash in Ukraine and intensified the boycott of Pinchuk-organised events. President Petro Poroshenko declined to take part in the Foundation's annual Ukrainian Breakfast at the World Economic Forum in Davos in January 2017, and commentators reported the announced launch of a rival "anti-YES" conference.

=== Business interests and ties to Russia ===
Some critics linked their objections to YES to Pinchuk's business interests, including those connected to Russia. His principal asset, the pipe and steel producer Interpipe, maintained a Moscow-based subsidiary that supplied Russian companies; the subsidiary began liquidation in December 2023, and Interpipe has stated that it does not operate on the Russian market. The Ukrainian subsidiary of Alfa-Bank—whose beneficiaries included the Russian businessmen Mikhail Fridman, Petr Aven and German Khan—was a partner of the YES annual meeting in 2012 and 2013 and provided financing to Pinchuk's companies. In commentary published by the outlet Svidomi, the analyst Petro Burkovsky of the Ilko Kucheriv Democratic Initiatives Foundation argued that Pinchuk's foundation projects served to divert attention from his Russian business links; Pinchuk presents himself as a businessman free of politics, and the Foundation has disputed reports of cooperation with Russia.

=== 2026 drone strike ===
On September 12, 2026, a Russian drone struck a train near Yahodln railway station in western Ukraine, shortly after a diplomatic train carrying former British prime minister Boris Johnson and other European officials had passed through the area. The officials were returning from the Yalta European Strategy conference in Kyiv. Ukrainian Railways suggested that the diplomatic train may have been the intended target. No casualties were recorded among the officials. Johnson subsequently condemned the attack as a "senseless" attack on civilian infrastructure.

== Links ==
YouTube: YES WAR ROOM: Yalta European Strategy Annual Meeting 2023 Opening
