= Hanna Hopko =

Ukrainian politician

- Ганна Гопко
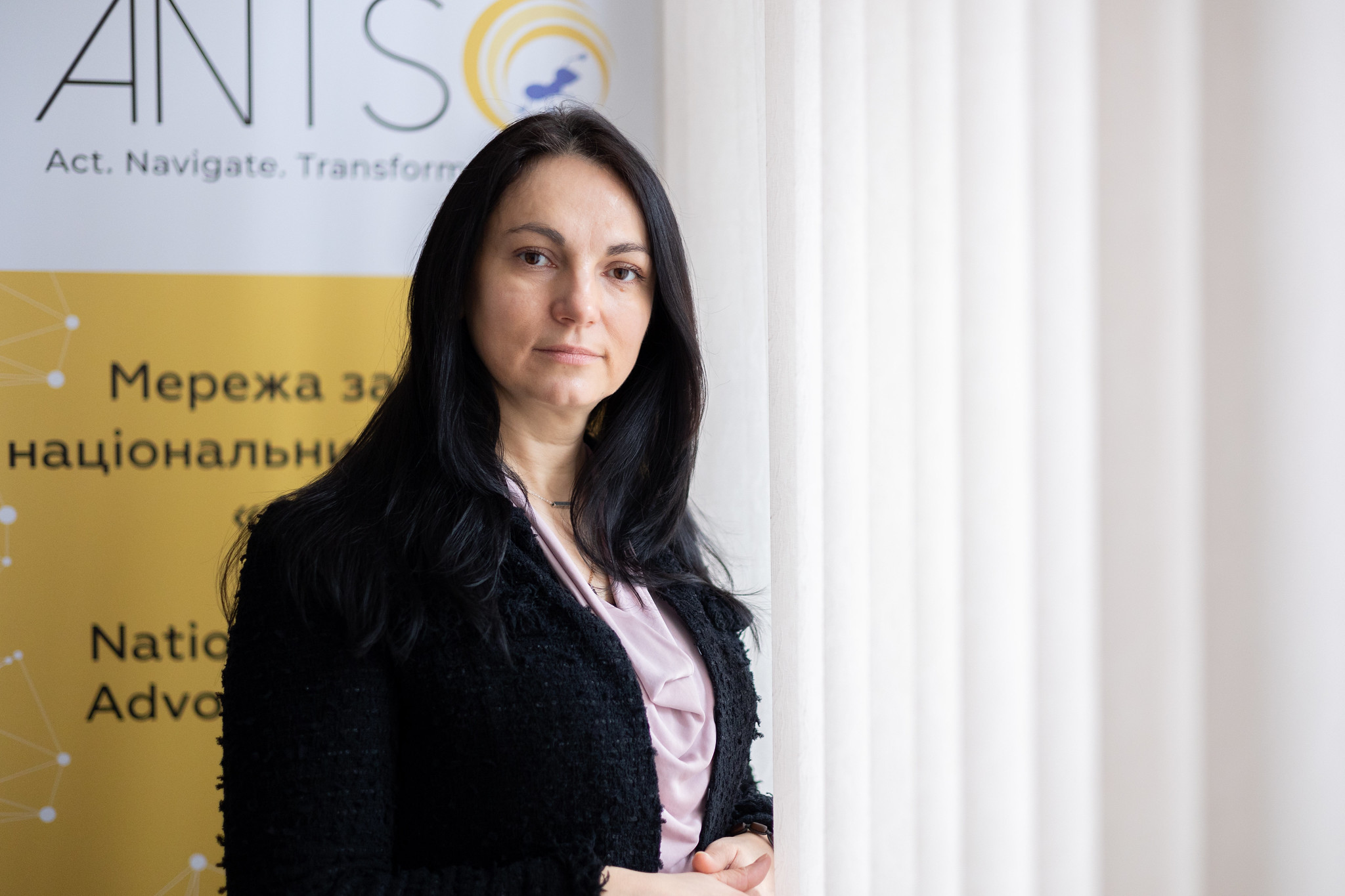

Head of the Committee on foreign affairs of the Verkhovna Rada of Ukraine
- In office 27 November 2014 – 29 August 2019

People's Deputy of Ukraine

8th convocation
- In office 29 November 2014 – 29 August 2019

Personal details
- Born: 4 March 1982 (age 44) Hanachivka, Peremyshliany Raion, Lviv Oblast, Ukrainian SSR, USSR
- Spouse: Oleksandr Zhuk
- Children: 1

Hanna Hopko (Ukrainian: Ганна Миколаївна Гопко; born 4 March 1982) is a Ukrainian civil society leader and politician, a former Member of Parliament and head of the Committee on Foreign Affairs of Ukraine's Verkhovna Rada. She did not participate in the 2019 Ukrainian parliamentary election.

She is the founder and Head of the Board of ANTS National Interests Advocacy Network, co-founder of the International Center for Ukrainian Victory, and Warsaw Security Forum International Advisory Council member.

Hopko is an expert in advocacy, on Russian expansionism and hybrid warfare. She was one of the civic leaders of the EuroMaidan during Ukraine's Revolution of Dignity. Hopko was elected to Parliament from the pro-European Self-Reliance Party in 2014 and later served as an independent MP. She has spoken on security issues at forums hosted by Canada, such as the 95th Rose-Roth Seminar of the Canadian NATO Parliamentary Association held in Kyiv and was the keynote speaker alongside Canada's Foreign Minister Chrystia Freeland at the 2019 Ukraine Reform Conference in Toronto. She belongs to the Young Global Leaders Networks of World Economic Forum and Munich Security Conference.

== Early life and education ==
Hopko was born 4 March 1982 in Hanachivka, Peremyshliany Raion, Lviv Oblast. In 2004, she received a MA in international journalism at Lviv University, a PhD in Social Communications in 2009 and a CEP Diploma for achievements in ecological teaching from the Civic Education Project. In 2008 she completed the Leadership Program in TC at Johns Hopkins Bloomberg School of Public Health. In 2009 she received a PhD in social communications at Taras Shevchenko National University of Kyiv. In 2012 she studied at the Ukrainian School of Political Studies. In 2017, she completed the program Transformational Leadership: Leadership at the Edge at Saïd Business School, University of Oxford.

== Career ==
=== Civil society activities ===
Hopko has contributed to various training programs for civil society activists in Ukraine, Kazakhstan, the Kyrgyz Republic, Georgia, and Belarus.

From 2005 to 2007, she worked as communications manager of the Ukraine Citizen Action Network (UCAN/ISC, USAID contractor) in Kyiv, and led environmental journalism training programs in Donetsk Oblast, Belarus and Kazakhstan.

In 2009, she co-founded the Life Regional Advocacy Center, Ukraine's primary partner of the Bloomberg Initiative to reduce tobacco use, and the Ukrainian representative of ENSP, FCA and WHO. Hopko was deputy director of the Center until April 2012.

In 2009 Hopko also became an advocacy coordinator of the National Coalition of NGOs and Initiatives For Smoke-Free Ukraine. She successfully advocated for five tobacco-control laws, including a complete ban on tobacco advertising and sponsorship; a ban on smoking in all public and indoor work areas; the implementation of graphic warnings on cigarette packaging; and an increase in tobacco taxes. According to the World Health Organization's 2011 report on tobacco, Ukraine moved from 4th to 29th in the world for prevalence of smoking, due largely to efforts led by Hopko.

In January 2012, Hopko became a member of the Board of Trustees of the Ohkmatdyt National Children's Specialized Hospital.

From 2010 to 2012, she was an adviser for the Morality, Spirituality and National Health parliamentary group. From January 2011 to September 2014, she was an advocacy expert at the Institute of Political Education (expert at seminars for assistants, advisors of Members of the Parliament, civic activist) and at the National Democracy Institute (NDI).

From February to September 2014, she worked as a coordinator of the Reanimation Package of Reforms initiative and served in an inter-factional parliamentary group, Platform of the Reforms.

Hopko was the initiator and co-organizer of the international conference Democracy in Action. Participants were Volodymyr Zelenskyy, Maia Sandu, Mircea Geoană, Gianni Buquicchio, Věra Jourová and Samantha Power.

After the full-scale Russian invasion of Ukraine, Hopko took the lead in various humanitarian and advocacy efforts of Ukraine by implementing advocacy campaigns for international support to Ukraine, including providing Ukraine with high-precision weapons, ammunition, Leopard and Abrams tanks, F-16s and ATACMS.

She led the National Interest Advocacy Network, and the International Center for Ukrainian Victory, organizations that support Ukraine and its people on an individual, community, and global level. Her organizations help communities recover and rebuild after occupation and help in establishing and strengthening Ukrainian ties with international partners. One of the key areas of her activity is supporting the Armed Forces of Ukraine and bringing Ukraine towards EU and NATO.

=== International Centre for Ukrainian Victory ===
Since Russia's invasion of Ukraine on February 24, 2022, Hopko, together with other Ukrainian civil society leaders Daria Kaleniuk, Olena Halushka, Olga Aivazovska as well as Katarzyna Pisarska Fundacja im. Kazimierza Pułaskiego established the International Centre for Ukrainian Victory (ICUV). Since February 2023 Hopko has been lobbying for sanctions against Russia, pushing for the establishment of a tribunal to hold Russia accountable for its crimes, coordinating humanitarian aid, collaborating with the international community to equip the Armed Forces of Ukraine, and planning for Ukraine's recovery. In February 2022, ICUV began the Block Putin Wallets campaign, pushing Western governments to confiscate Russian oligarchs' assets. Hopko also defended Ukraine's interests during a visit to South Korea, speaking at a round table organized by Human Asia and the Transitional Justice Working Group in Seoul in November 2022.

In January 2023, under the MOUs signed with Hopko, Mykolaiv Mayor Oleksandr Syenkevych and Kherson сivil–military administration, Taiwan donated US$1 million to the three cities to purchase generators and heating equipment. In May 2023, at Forum Ukraine: Building Resilience for the Future in Stockholm, Hopko presented the "Sustainable Peace Manifesto Never Again 2.0", a document which outlines a vision of peace in Ukraine. She is one of the authors of Sustainable Peace Manifesto.

In January 2023, ICUV started the advocacy year in Japan to engage Japan in mobilizing world leaders for Ukraine’s victory, discuss the nuclear threat, and the need to strengthen sanctions against the aggressor, including personal sanctions against representatives of the Russian authorities who are carrying out repressions in Crimea, eastern Ukraine, and the newly occupied territories; and sanctions against Rosatom, the seizure of Russian assets, the importance of establishing an international tribunal, and the future reconstruction of Ukraine. Hopko visited Japan as part of this initiative to promote support for Ukraine, keep the world's attention on events in Ukraine, and attract resources for recovery. In May 2023, Hopko moderated the first Ukrainian-Taiwanese round table on the topic of tensions between China and Taiwan, and the impact of Ukraine's victory on the geopolitical situation in Asia, to develop and consolidate cooperation after last year's advocacy visit to Taiwan.

ANTS National Interests Advocacy Network

In 2019 Hanna Hopko with other leaders established the ANTS National Interests Advocacy Network to form Ukraine’s 2030 vision and assist the next generation of Ukrainian politicians in achieving it. Organisation's aim is to fully prepare for NATO and EU membership by 2030, and to share this experience at the regional level. These objects will be accomplished by implementing and promoting necessary reforms, fighting corruption, especially in the face of Ukrainian oligarchs, and countering russian aggression in its hybrid form.

=== Political career ===
During the parliamentary elections following the EuroMaidan revolution, Hopko headed the list of the Samopomich (of Self Reliance) Party, and was elected to the Parliament of Ukraine, where she was appointed chair of the Foreign Affairs Committee on 4 December 2014.

Hopko represented a new generation of young decision-makers in Ukrainian Parliament from the civil society representatives with ambitious reform agenda and who did not have a communist background.

Supporting the ratification of the Rome Statute of the International Criminal Court, Hopko stated: "It is a demonstration of readiness to build a rule-of-law state in which it is possible to punish for crimes against humanity and genocide."

On 31 August 2015, Hopko and four other MPs of the Self Reliance party voted in support of amendments to the Ukrainian Constitution that would implement decentralization reform in Ukraine. As a result, she and the other MPs were excluded from the political faction. Hopko remained an independent MP, not entering any other political faction. Hopko stated that the constitutional amendment was "an important step towards comprehensive change in Ukraine" and contained "no concessions to Russia".

In May 2017, she co-sponsored a bill in the Ukrainian parliament requiring 75% of national television programming, and 50% of local programming, to be in the Ukrainian language. Hopko and her associates believe that widespread use of the Russian language undermines Ukrainian statehood.

Hopko did not participate in the 2019 Ukrainian parliamentary election.

== Family ==
Hopko is married and has a daughter.

== Honors and awards ==
- National Democratic Institute 2014 Democracy Award, (December 2014)
- Certificate of Merit (October 2014), Georgetown Leadership Seminar, School of Foreign Service, Georgetown University.
- Leading Global Thinker (2014), Foreign Policy Magazine.
