= Hopko =

Hopko is a surname. Notable people with the surname include:

- Basil Hopko (1904–1976), Slovak Greek Catholic bishop
- Hanna Hopko (born 1982), Ukrainian politician and journalist
- Thomas Hopko (1939–2015), American Orthodox Christian priest and theologian
