= Daria Kaleniuk =

Ukrainian civil society activist

Daria Kaleniuk (Ukrainian: Дар'я Каленюк) is a Ukrainian civil society activist who is the executive director of the Anti-Corruption Action Center, based in Kyiv. During the 2022 Russian invasion of Ukraine, Kaleniuk came to international media prominence when she asked British prime minister Boris Johnson at a press conference in Warsaw why some London-based Russian oligarchs had not been targeted with sanctions and why he did not support the establishment of a no-fly zone over Ukraine.

Kaleniuk was born in Zhytomyr, Ukraine and studied law at the Yaroslav Mudryi National Law University and has a Master of Financial Services Law from Chicago-Kent College of Law, supported by the Fulbright Foreign Student Program. She is a member of the Young Global Leaders.

== Youth movement ==
Daria Kaleniuk started her civil society activity during student times in Kharkiv where she joined local branch of All-Ukrainian youth NGO “Foundation of Regional Initiatives”. She was coordinating international youth project “Eurobus”, which brought young leaders from the EU for the Europe Days celebration at small towns of Eastern and Southern Ukraine.

== Anti-corruption activity ==
Daria Kaleniuk is co-founder and executive director of the non-governmental organization Anti-Corruption Action Center (AntAC). Founded in 2012, the AntAC has led numerous anti-corruption reforms and initiatives conducting advocacy campaigns and participating in the development and implementation of required legislation.

During Euromaidan protests, she was running a campaign aimed at freezing assets of Viktor Yanukovych and his associates kept in Western jurisdictions. In December 2013, Kaleniuk and AntAC’s Head of the Board Vitaliy Shabunin launched Yanukovych Info, a website containing information on the foreign holdings of Ukraine's then-President Viktor Yanukovych, who reigned from 2010 until his ouster in 2014.

Following Yanukovych's ouster as a result of Revolution of Dignity, the AntAC assisted Ukraine's newly elected parliament in developing quality anti-corruption legislation, including laws establishing the National Anti-Corruption Bureau of Ukraine, Special Anti-corruption Prosecutor's Office, National Agency on Corruption Prevention, the High Anti Corruption Court open property registers, and electronic register of asset declarations of public officials.

Kaleniuk was member of first council of civil control at the newly established National Anti-Corruption Bureau of Ukraine (NABU). In 2015, she was delegated to the selection commission, which hired first NABU detectives. Kaleniuk was also delegated to the selection commission of Specialized Anticorruption Prosecution Office, where she served in 2016–2017.

AntAC played a leading role in advocacy campaign for setting asset recovery legislation, public registry of beneficial ownership, and anti-money laundering laws in Ukraine. As a part of these efforts, Kaleniuk founded the registry of Politically Exposed Persons in Ukraine that helps to track money laundering and corruption internationally.

In 2015, Daria Kaleniuk co-founded Anticorruption Research and Education Centre at Kyiv Mohyla Academy, where she serves as a board member.

On the eve of Russia’s full-scale invasion of Ukraine, in February 2022, Kaleniuk led AntAC’s campaign Block Putin Wallets, urging Western countries to seize the assets of Russian oligarchs.

== International Centre for Ukrainian Victory ==
After February 24, 2022, when Russia launched a large-scale invasion against Ukraine, Kaleniuk concentrated her activities on advocating international support for Ukraine. Jointly with Hanna Hopko, Olena Halushka and Olga Aivazovska, she founded the International Centre for Ukrainian Victory (ICUV) in cooperation with Warsaw-based Casimir Pulaski Foundation.

The ICUV advocates for Ukrainian interests internationally. The ICUV activities include advocacy campaigns aiming at expanding security assistance for Ukraine, strengthening sanctions against the Russian Federation, confiscating Russian assets, and providing funding for rebuilding Ukraine after the war. Kaleniuk and her colleagues have organized protests and advocacy actions in Warsaw, Paris, Berlin, Brussels, Washington, D.C. and many other cities.

Kaleniuk engages in advocacy meetings with officials and politicians and provides interviews to media from around the world. While she keeps running Kyiv-based Anti-Corruption Action Centre focusing on anti-corruption and judicial reforms, she spends a lot of her time influencing decision-makers in the West to provide Ukraine with security and economic aid.

On April 6, 2022, Kaleniuk was one of the five witnesses who testified at the Helsinki Commission regarding connection between Russia's invasion and successful anti-corruption reforms in Ukraine and called on European and American officials to tackle corruption globally by targeting Russian oligarchs and their enablers.
