= Vitaliy Shabunin =

Ukrainian human rights activist (born 1984)

- Віталій Шабунін
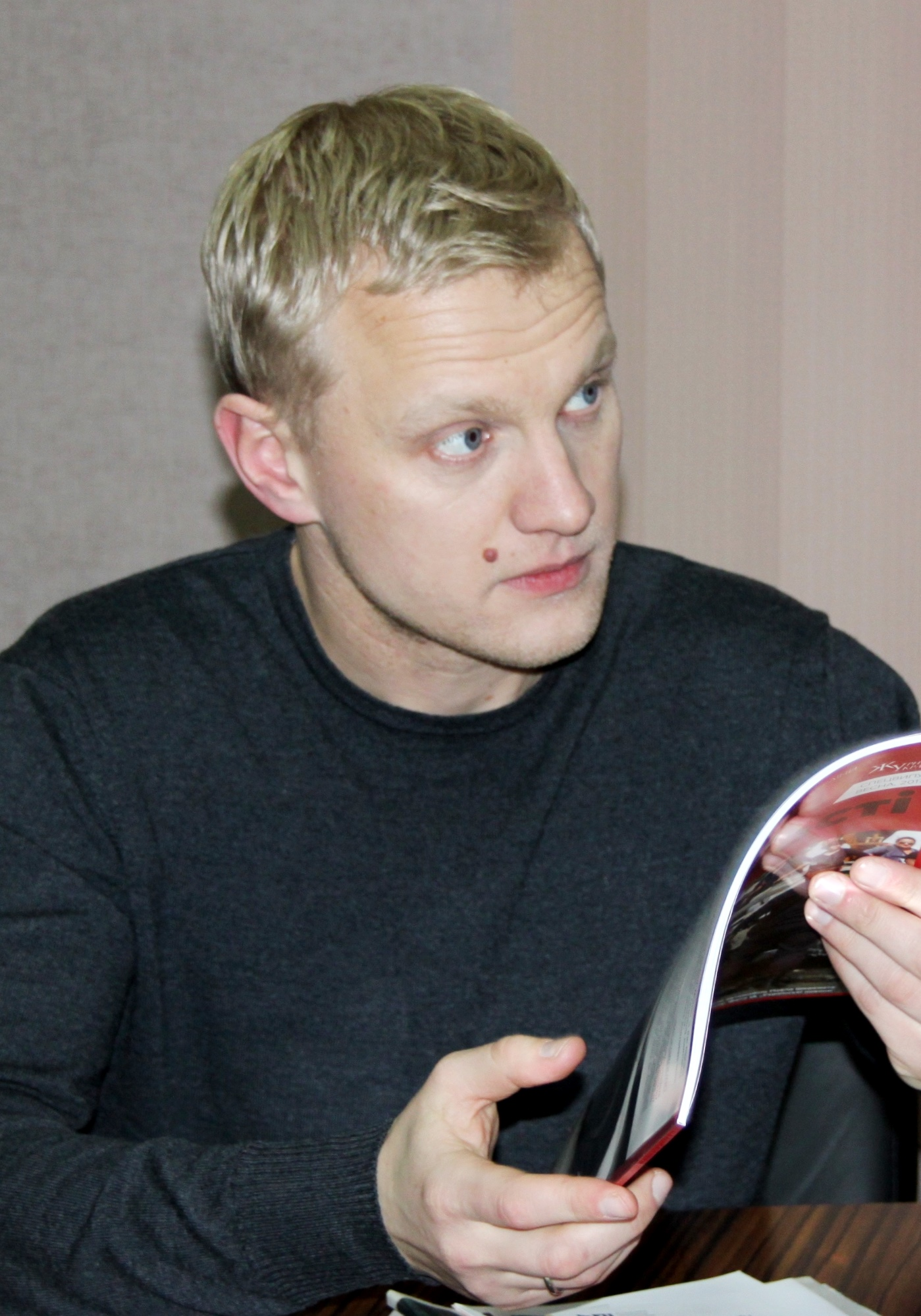
- Vitaliy Shabunin in 2018

Personal details
- Born: November 26, 1984 (age 41) Rivne, Ukrainian SSR, Soviet Union
- Children: 2

Military service
- Allegiance: Ukraine
- Years of service: 2022-present
- Rank: Sergeant
- Battles/wars: Russian invasion of Ukraine

Vitaliy Viktorovich Shabunin (Ukrainian: Віталій Вікторович Шабунін; born 26 November 1984) is a Ukrainian human rights activist. In 2012, he co-founded the Anti-Corruption Action Center, a non-governmental organisation that reports on corruption in Ukraine. In 2025, Shabunin was charged with evading military service and fraud, in a move criticised by national and international human rights groups as being politically motivated and linked to his anti-corruption activism.

== Personal life ==
Shabunin was born and raised in Rivne, Rivne Oblast, in what was then the Ukrainian Soviet Socialist Republic. He is married with two children and lives in Kyiv.

== Political career ==
In 2006, Shabunin was elected as a deputy to Rivne City Council. During his time as a deputy, he worked as an assistant to Viktor Matchuk and later to Lesya Orobets.

During the 2014 Ukrainian parliamentary election, Shabunin ran to serve as a member of the Verkhovna Rada on the Civil Position list. He was not elected.

== Activism ==
In 2008, Shabunin moved to Kyiv, where he joined the non-governmental organisation Opora, and also headed the youth organisation Foundation of Regional Initiatives.

In 2012, Shabunin co-founded the Anti-Corruption Action Centre (AntAC) with Daria Kaleniuk, which subsequently reported on hundreds of corruption cases involving the Ukrainian government, police and military, as well as local authorities and other institutions. In addition to his work with AntAC, Shabunin frequently posted videos on YouTube, including collaborations with investigative journalists such as Yuriy Nikolov. Shabunin's activism has received notice in the Ukrainian media and has been both praised and criticised. AntAC's status as being wholly funded through international grants since 2014 has led to some describing Shabunin as being a "representative of foreign interests in Ukraine".

In December 2013, during the Euromaidan, Shabunin and Kaleniuk launched YanukovychInfo, a website detailing the foreign holdings of the then-President of Ukraine, Viktor Yanukovych, as part of AntAC's campaign to freeze the assets held by Yanukovych and his associations outside of Ukraine.

In 2017, Shabunin criticised members of then-President of Ukraine Petro Poroshenko's entourage, including lawmakers Igor Kononenko and Mykola Martynenko, accusing the former of colluding to siphon profits from the Ministry of Health. During a protest about this, a criminal case was opened against Shabunin for "beating a journalist" after he allegedly assaulted blogger Vsevolod Filimonenko after Filimonenko insulted one of Shabunin's colleagues; during the encounter, Shabunin suffered from chemical burns after antiseptic was thrown in his face. In 2023, Filimonenko admitted to having previously blackmailed Shabunin and other activists.

Shabunin has been critical of Volodymyr Zelenskyy, the President of Ukraine since 2019, for his perceived backsliding on the issue of corruption. Shabunin has accused Zelenskyy of passing legislation that offered an amnesty to defence industry contractors accused of corruption; he also criticised Zelenskyy's decision to veto an independently selected anti-corruption candidate to serve as the head of the Economic Security Bureau.

In July 2020, Shabunin's home in Hnidyn, Kyiv Oblast was burned down in a suspected arson attack. The following December, explosive devices were found at the entrances of the homes of Shabunin's mother in Rivne and his wife's parents in Kyiv. Investigations into all three crimes did not lead to any charges or any assailants being identified. The European Union delegation to Ukraine and the World Bank both expressed concerns about the attacks and called on Ukrainian authorities to investigate. Over a thousand people donated money to support Shabunin to rebuild his home.

== Military service ==
In 2022, following the Russian invasion of Ukraine, Shabunin enlisted in the Ukrainian Ground Forces. He was initially based with the 270th battalion, working as a radio station electrician. In 2025, he was transferred to the 43rd combat brigade and stationed near the front line in Chuhuiv Raion, Kharkiv Oblast, serving as chief sergeant of the support company.

In May 2026, Shabunin stated that he had been demobilised after developing glaucoma.

== 2025 arrest ==
Human Rights Watch reported that Shabunin had been the subject of smears from pro-government media since at least 2024, particularly on Telegram, including threats to his life, doxxing, and reports that he was a draft evader and a fraudster. In 2025, blogger Volodymyr Boyko shared reported leaks from law enforcement officials that accused Shabunin of faking his military service. At the same time, Shabunin's former commander, Viktor Yushko, was announced as being under investigation for ordering fictitious business trips, costing the state 224, 000 UAH; it was alleged that these business trips had included Shabunin.

In December 2023, the State Bureau of Investigation (SBI) had started an investigation into Shabunin. On 11 July 2025, the SBI conducted targeted searches at Shabunin's home in Kyiv as well as at his base in Chuhuiv, seizing electronic devices belonging to Shabunin, his wife and children. AntAC subsequently reported that at least 70 searches had taken place of Shabunin and other AntAC employees.

On 15 July 2025 a hearing was held at the Pecherskyi District Court in Kyiv, where it was announced that Shabunin was under investigation for evading military service during war time and large-scale fraud, in breach of articles 409 and 190 respectively of the Criminal Code of Ukraine. Shabunin was accused of not being present with his unit as required and "failing to appear at the place of duty for a long period [under] the guise of 'business trips'" and for continuing to claim a wage "despite his absence from a military unit". He was also reported to have used a military vehicle without permission. Shabunin was restricted from leaving his unit's location, with a further hearing scheduled for 20 August.

On 14 August, the SBI announced it had completed its investigation into Shabunin. At a hearing on 19 August, Shabunin's travel restrictions were extended to 19 October.

In December 2025, Shabunin accused agents from the SBI and the Prosecutor General's Office of circulating personal photos of him on Telegram that they had obtained after seizing his phone following his arrest. The SBI stated it would investigate the allegations, but had not done as of February 2026.

=== Response ===
AntAC reported that the searches of Shabunin's home and the seizure of electronic devices had happened illegally without a warrant, and stated that no legal justification had been offered to explain the urgency that would justify a search happening without a warrant. The searches were almost completed before Shabunin and his family were able to obtain legal representation. AntAC criticised the nature of the charges, stating that the reported absence of Shabunin from his unit from September 2022 until early 2023 was due to him being ordered to complete a secondment to the National Agency on Corruption Prevention. They also suggested the charges were linked to a recent corruption suspicion notice AntAC had issued to Deputy Prime Minister of Ukraine Oleksiy Chernyshov, as well as recently published reports critical of the Ministry of Defence and the Presidential Office over its weapon procurement and supply policy. AntAC accused authorities of "testing red lines" due to AntAC's exposure of corruption and "harmful government initiatives" and described the case as a "vendetta".

In Shabunin's first statement following the charges, he described the investigation as "a step on the path to President Volydymyr Zelenskyy's corrupt authoritarianism".

Human Rights Watch called on the Ukrainian government to not engage in "retaliation" against Shibunin for his exposure of state corruption and abuses of power. On 15 July 2025, the same day as Shabunin's first court appearance, a group of 59 public organisations called on the President, the Prosecutor, and the SBI to prevent the justice system from being used for "political reprisals" and to persecute human rights activists, describing the charges against Shibunin as representing either "complete incompetence" of public officials or a "targeted attack" on Shibunin because of his criticisms of the government. The letter was signed by prominent groups including Zmina Human Rights Centre, Transparency International Ukraine, Bihus, Opora and the German Marshall Fund.

A spokesperson for the SBI denied reports that the investigation was politically motivated, stating it was a "procedural action [in] no way related to [Shabunin's] professional activities". However, a lawmaker from Zelenskyy's Servant of the People party described the charges as being a "selective miscarriage of justice".

In August 2025, Shabunin's lawyer, Olena Shcherban, reported she had been subjected to an online smear campaign after agreeing to represent Shabunin, in addition to an attempt to strip her of her licence to practice law.
