= Vitalii Markiv =

Ukrainian former military commander

- Віталій Михайлович Марків
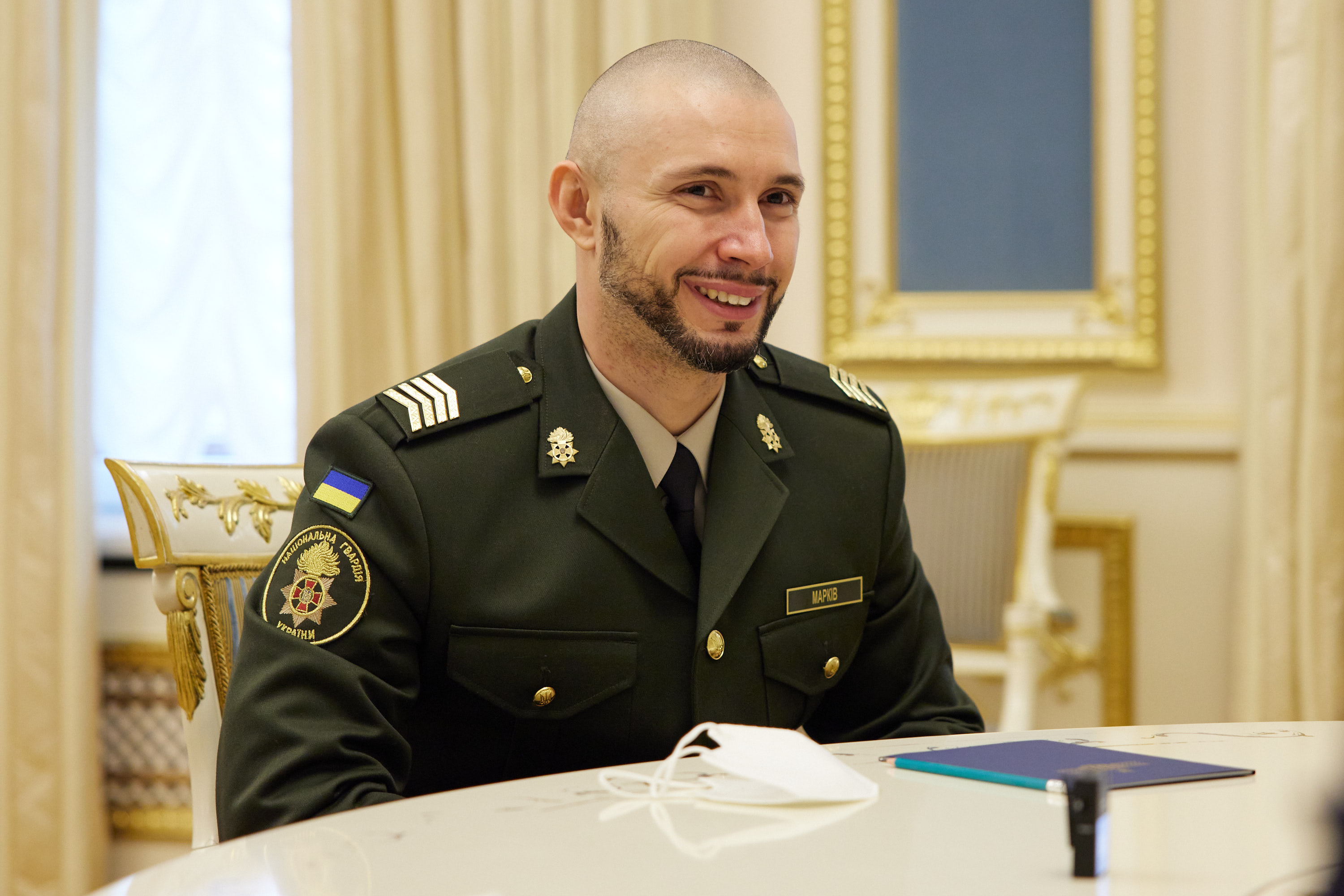
- Born: 16 August 1989 (age 37); Khorostkiv, Ukrainian SSR, Soviet Union (now Ukraine)
- Military career
- Allegiance: Ukraine

Vitalii Mykhailovych Markiv (Ukrainian: Віталій Михайлович Марків; born 16 August 1989) is a Ukrainian former military commander of the General Serhiy Kulchytsky Battalion of the National Guard of Ukraine. He was prosecuted and convicted by an Italian court for directing mortar fire that killed Russian dissident and journalist Andrei Mironov and Italian photojournalist Andrea Rocchelli near the city of Sloviansk. His conviction was eventually overturned, and he was fully acquitted by Supreme Court of Cassation of Italy.

== Early life ==
Vitalii Markiv was born on 16 August 1989 in Khorostkiv. At the age of 16, he moved to Italy with his sister and became an Italian citizen. He returned to Ukraine at the end of 2013 to take part in the demonstrations and the 2014 Euromaidan revolution.

== Participation in the war in Donbas ==
In 2014, Markiv joined the National Guard of Ukraine and took part in the Battles for Sloviansk. He was a deputy platoon commander in the General Serhiy Kulchytsky Battalion.

== Investigation and trial in Italy ==
Markiv was accused of killing Italian photojournalist Andrea Rocchelli near the city of Sloviansk, Donetsk, in May 2014 and was arrested during a trip to Italy on 30 June 2017.

Angelo Napolitano, Chief of the Penitentiary Police, reported that Markiv was planning to escape from prison, therefore he was transferred to Opera prison in 2017.

On 12 July 2019, a court in Pavia sentenced Markiv to 24 years in prison for his involvement in Rocchelli's death. The ruling was criticised in Ukraine, as well as by various journalists, the Italian Radical Party and +Europa for being based on circumstantial evidence. On the other hand, the Italian Union of Journalists considered it to be "exemplary justice", showing that the killers of journalists can not always get away with their crimes. The mainstream press and elements of the Italian left considered Markiv to be an extremist nationalist, whereas an article in The New York Times suggested that these representations constituted Russian propaganda, which the paper considered to have played a role in Mark's conviction.

Raffaele Della Valle, Markiv's lawyer, claimed his complete innocence and declared that he is going to appeal the tribunal sentence.

On 3 November 2020, the Milan Court of Appeal, while holding the Ukrainian armed forces guilty of the murder of the journalists, overturned the sentence of Pavia court and acquitted Markiv of all charges, "for not having committed the fact". The following day Markiv returned to Ukraine.

On 16 February 2021, the Attorney General's Office of Milan stated that would appeal the second degree acquittal. On 9 December 2021 the Supreme Court of Cassation of Italy fully acquitted Markiv.

=== Reaction in Ukraine and abroad ===
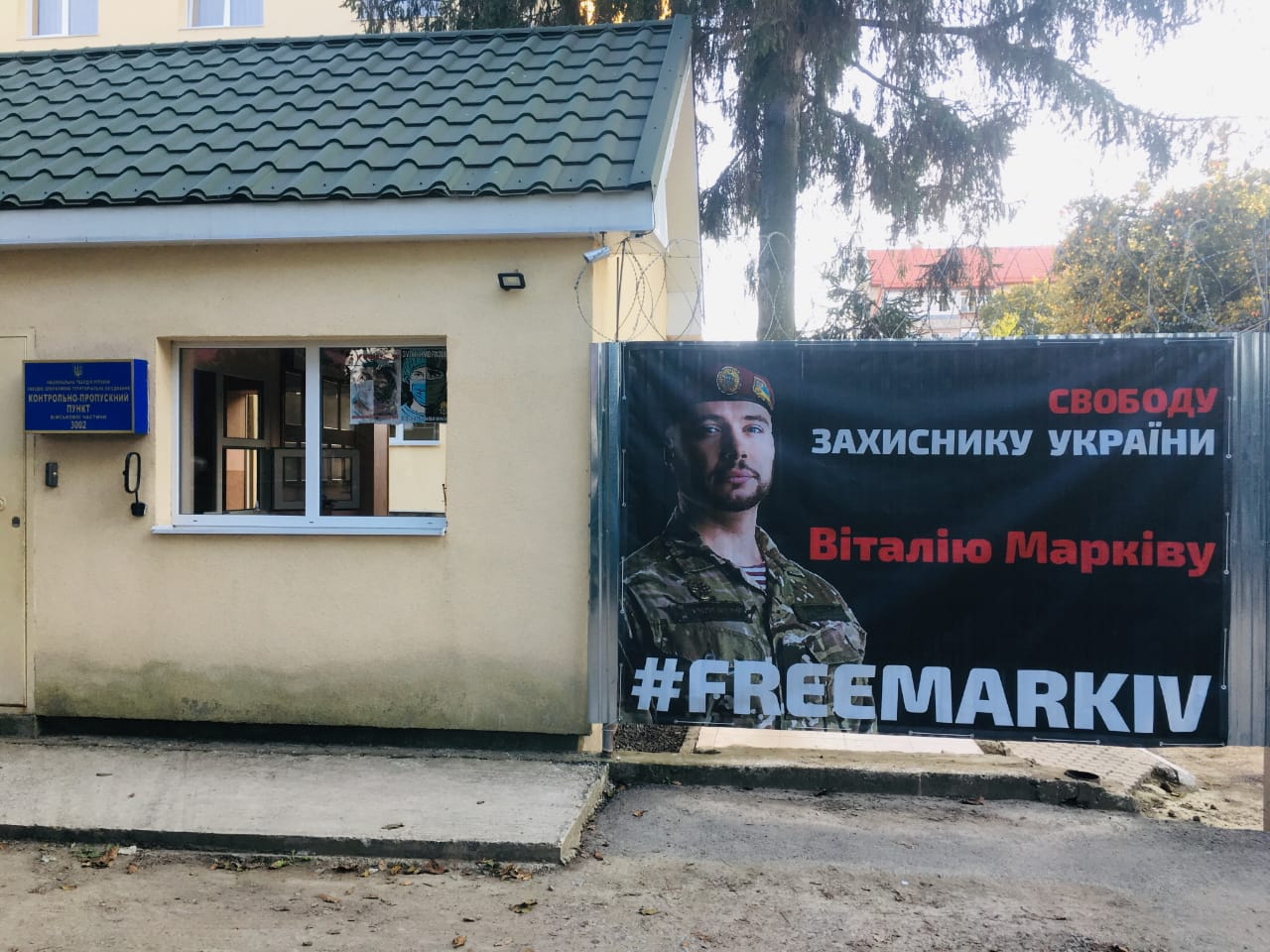
A banner in Uzhhorod calling for Markiv's release

According to a Ukrainian investigation, the journalists were killed in a shelling conducted by the "Russian-backed terrorist forces".

The Ministry of Internal Affairs of Ukraine expressed concern about Markiv's arrest.

The Advisor to the Head of the Ministry of Internal Affairs of Ukraine, People's Deputy from the People's Front faction, Anton Herashchenko said the detention in Italy of Markiv, a deputy commander of a battalion of the National Guard of Ukraine, might be another provocation by the Russian special services.

As per ex-chief prosecutor of Ukraine Yevhen Yenin, the Ukrainian prosecution for three years tried to persuade Italian prosecution to visit the place of death to conduct a thorough examination, however Italian prosecution denied such proposal. According to the Ukrainian prosecution Markiv wasn't able to see or identify Rocchelli from his position.

Journalist Paul Gogo, who worked in Sloviansk during the time of the shelling, described the initial decision of the Italian court - which found Markiv guilty - as "mind-blowing" and as based on false testimonies. According to Gogo, the court proceeding was politicized and investigation wasn't done properly.

On 25 July 2019, during a phone conversation with Italian PM Giuseppe Conte, Ukrainian President Volodymyr Zelenskyy stressed the importance of unbiased investigation of Rocchelli's death and offered legal assistance from Ukraine in conducting a thorough joint examination of the circumstances.

The Italian conviction of Markiv was compared with the Russian conviction of Nadiya Savchenko, also for allegedly directing mortar fire that killed journalists.

=== Indictment in Russia ===
On 11 December 2020, the Moscow Basmanny District Court issued an indictment of Vitaliy Markiv in absentia of the murder of the two journalists.

== Return to Ukraine ==
After his release, Markiv returned to serve in the National Guard of Ukraine. Artem Shevchenko presented a documentary film about Markiv, called Pozyvnoy Ital’yanets (Callsign Italian), produced with the collaboration of the Ministry of Internal Affairs and the Ministry of Culture.
