= List of Russian units which invaded the territory of Ukraine (2014–2022) =

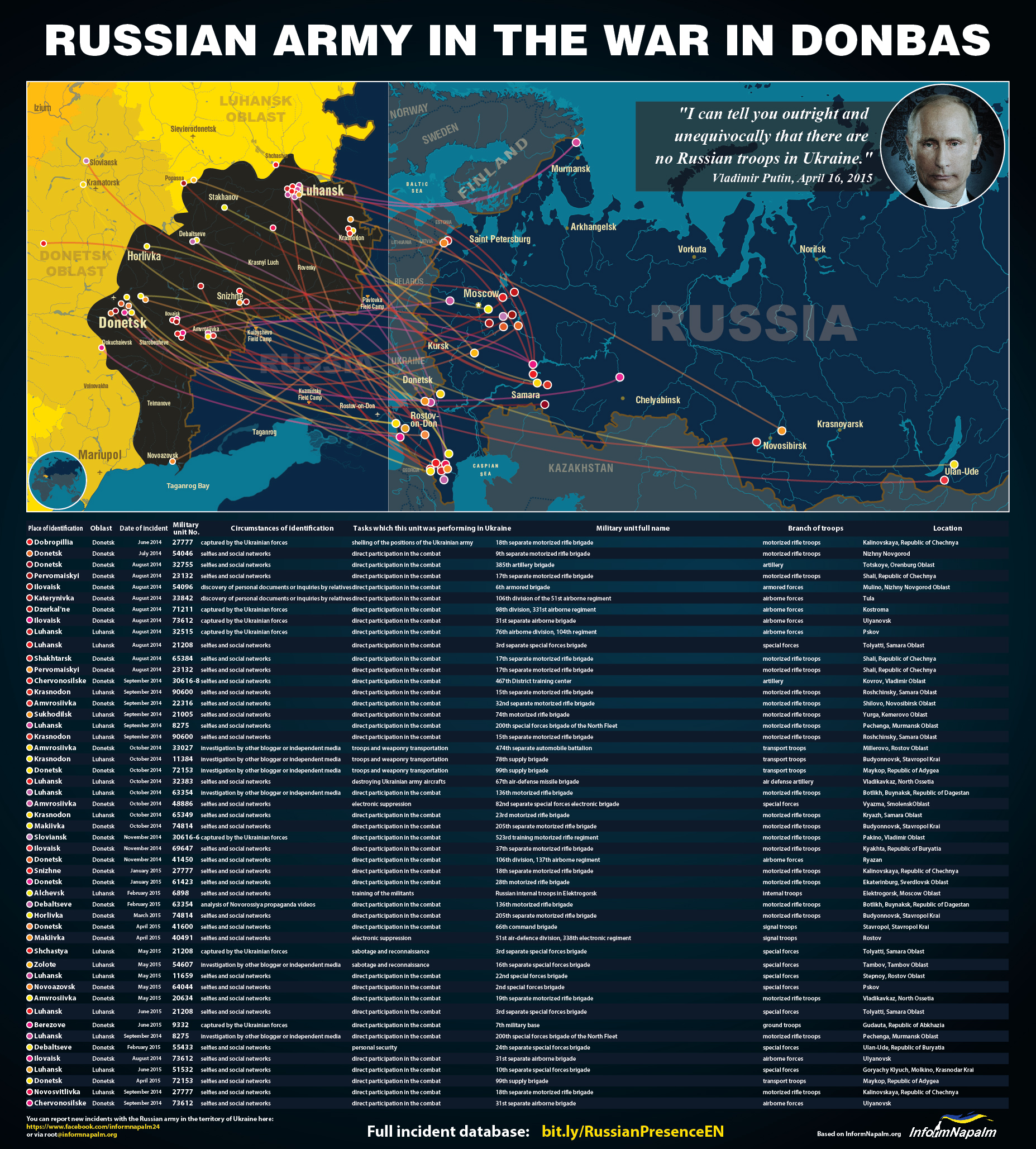
Russian Army formations in the war on the Donbas. Infographic from InformNapalm

This is a list of regular military formations of the Armed Forces of the Russian Federation participating in the Russo-Ukrainian War from 2014.

== Crimea ==
Before the invasion and annexation of Crimea, most of the Russian Federation's forces based in Crimea according to the terms of the Kharkiv Pact were navy ships of the Black Sea Fleet and their support staff. Of ground combat units, only the 510th Naval Infantry Brigade in Feodosiia and the 810th Naval Infantry Brigade in Simferopol were legally stationed on Ukrainian territory.

From February 20, 2014, a number of Russian army and airborne units entered Ukraine without permission, to occupy the Crimean peninsula, including elements of the following:

- 7th Air Assault Division (Novorossiysk)
- 3rd Spetsnaz Brigade (Tolyatti)
- 10th Spetsnaz Brigade (Krasnodar)
- 16th Spetsnaz Brigade (Tambov)
- 18th Motor Rifle Brigade (Grozny)
- 22nd Spetsnaz Brigade (Stepnoy)
- 31st Air Assault Brigade (Ulyanovsk)
- 291st Artillery Brigade (Troitskaya)
- 25th Spetsnaz Regiment (Stavropol)
- 45th Spetsnaz Regiment (Kubinka, Moscow region)
- 382nd Naval Infantry Battalion (Temryuk)
- 727th Naval Infantry Battalion (Astrakhan)
- Special Operations Forces Command (Prokhladny)

== Donbas ==
The first wave of the invasion of regular troops of the Russian Federation came in August 2014.

As of November 2016, troops from 75 Russian military units were identified in the Donbas according to investigations of the InformNapalm volunteer community.

On the basis of some units of the invasion, as well as the mercenaries and collaboration, a regular structure was created with two Army Corps: 1st Army Corps in Donetsk and 2nd Army Corps in Lugansk.

=== July 2014 ===
Diversion and reconnaissance teams, which entered Ukrainian territory beginning on July 14, 2014, were formed from elements of the following units:

- 2nd Spetsnaz Brigade
- 10th Spetsnaz Brigade
- 45th Guards Independent Reconnaissance Regiment (Kubinka, Moscow Oblast)
- 173rd Separate Guards Reconnaissance Company, 106th Guards Tula Airborne Division (Tula)
- Reconnaissance Battalion, 9th Separate Motor Rifle Brigade (former 84th Separate Reconnaissance Battalion)
- Reconnaissance Battalion, 18th Guards Motor Rifle Brigade (formerly 18th Separate Reconnaissance Battalion)

=== August 2014 ===
Battalion tactical groups, which entered Ukrainian territory beginning on August 11, 2014, were formed from elements of the following units:

- 17th Guards Motor Rifle Brigade
- 18th Guards Motor Rifle Brigade
- 21st Guards Motor Rifle Brigade
- 33rd Mountain Motor Rifle Brigade
- 247th Guards Air Assault Regiment, 7th Guards Mountain Air Assault Division
- 104th Guards Air Assault Regiment, 76th Guards Air Assault Division
- 331st Guards Airborne Regiment, 98th Guards Airborne Division
- 137th Guards Airborne Regiment, 106th Guards Airborne Division
- 31st Guards Air Assault Brigade
- 2nd Spetsnaz Brigade

=== February 2015 ===
As of February 2015, elements of the following Russian units were fighting in the Donbas:

==== Northern Operational Area ====
- 2nd Guards Tamanskaya Motor Rifle Division (elements)
- 8th Guards Mountain Motor Rifle Brigade
- 18th Guards Motor Rifle Brigade
- 19th Motor Rifle Brigade
- 20th Guards Motor Rifle Division
- 23rd Guards Motor Rifle Brigade
- 27th Guards Motor Rifle Brigade
- 28th Motor Rifle Brigade
- 32nd Motor Rifle Brigade
- 33rd Mountain Motor Rifle Brigade
- 37th Guards Motor Rifle Brigade
- 31st Guards Air Assault Brigade
- 104th Guards Air Assault Regiment, 76th Guards Air Assault Division
- 217th Guards Airborne Regiment, 98th Guards Airborne Division
- 137th Guards Airborne Regiment, 106th Guards Airborne Division
- 10th Spetsnaz Brigade
- 346th Spetsnaz Brigade
- 25th Spetsnaz Regiment
- FSB Special Operations Centre
- Dzerzhinsky Division (elements)
- 107th Operational Brigade
- Chechen Ministry of Internal Affairs Combined Battalion
- 5th Guards Tank Brigade
- 6th Tank Brigade
- 13th Guards Tank Regiment, 4th Guards Kantemirovskaya Tank Division
- 1st Guards Rocket Brigade
- 79th Guards Rocket Brigade
- 232nd Rocket Artillery Brigade
- 288th Artillery Brigade
- 291st Artillery Brigade
- 385th Guards Artillery Brigade
- 1065th Guards Artillery Regiment, 98th Guards Airborne Division
- 573rd Separate Artillery Reconnaissance Battalion
- 67th Anti-Aircraft Rocket Brigade
- 74th SIGINT Regiment
- 78th Materiel Support Brigade
- 7015th Armaments Maintenance Base
- 7016th Armaments Maintenance Base
- 282nd Armaments Repair Base
- 29th Railway Brigade

==== Southern Operational Area ====
- 2nd Guards Tamanskaya Motor Rifle Division (elements)
- 9th Separate Motor Rifle Brigade
- 138th Guards Motor Rifle Brigade
- 11th Guards Air Assault Brigade
- 45th Guards Independent Reconnaissance Regiment
- 561st Naval Spetsnaz Battalion
- 54th Reconnaissance Units Training Centre
- Dzerzhinsky Division (elements)
- 12th Guards Tank Regiment, 4th Guards Kantemirovskaya Tank Division
- 200th Artillery Brigade
- 268th Guards Artillery Brigade
- 1140th Guards Artillery Regiment, 76th Guards Air Assault Division
- 59th Communications Brigade
- 95th Communications Brigade
- 31st Engineer Regiment
- 3rd Tactical Infantry Division (Yüksekova)
