= ENSP =

ENSP may refer to:

== Higher education ==
- École Nationale de la Santé Publique, the name before 2008 of the French School of Higher studies in Public Health - École des Hautes Études en Santé Publique (EHESP), in France
- École nationale supérieure de paysage de Versailles, in France
- Escola Nacional de Saúde Pública, at NOVA University Lisbon, in Portugal
- Entreprise nationale de services aux puits, an oilfield services company, in Algeria

== See also ==
- en space: U+2002 EN SPACE (&ensp; · &#8194; · &#x2002;) : ensp
