= Andrei Mironov (activist) =

Russian human rights activist, reporter, and interpreter

Andrei Nikolaevich Mironov
- Андрей Николаевич Миронов
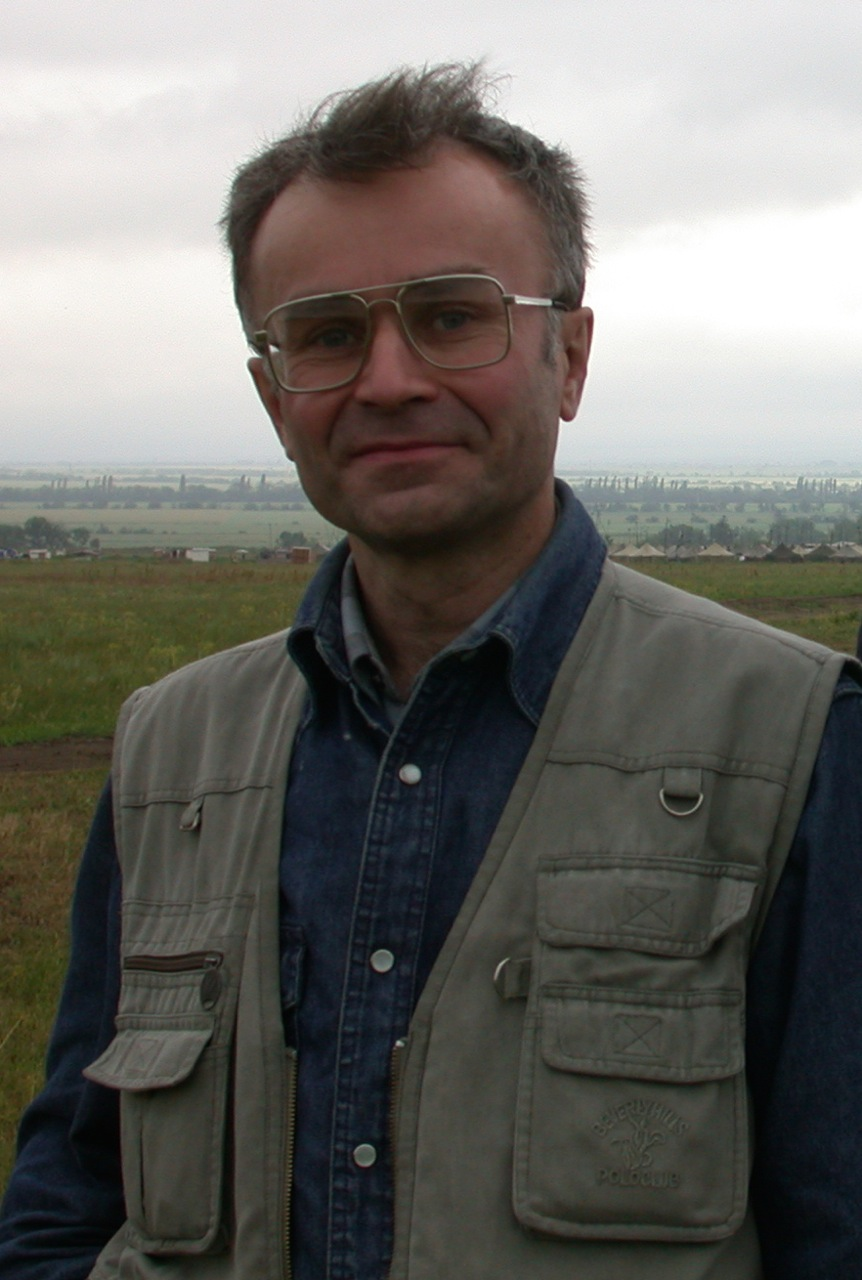
- Andrei Mironov
- Born: 31 March 1954; Irkutsk, Russian SFSR, USSR
- Died: 24 May 2014 (aged 60); Sloviansk, Ukraine
- Occupations: Human-rights activist, reporter, fixer, interpreter

Andrei Nikolaevich Mironov (Russian: Андре́й Никола́евич Миро́нов; 31 March 1954 – 24 May 2014) was a Russian human rights activist, reporter, fixer, and interpreter. The Washington Post described him as "the interpreter who tried to save Russia". Mironov was killed while covering the 2014 Siege of Sloviansk in Ukraine.

== Early life and education ==
Andrei Nikolaevich Mironov was born on 31 March 1954 in the Siberian city of Irkutsk. The family later settled in Izhevsk (renamed Ustinov from 1985 to 1987), the capital of Russia's Udmurtia republic. Mironov's parents were geophysicists by profession. The family were privately very critical of the Soviet regime, their outlook reflecting the relatively independent attitudes of the Soviet scientific intelligentsia.

One of the main interests in his early years was history studies, and he interviewed one of the accomplices involved in the assassination of the royal family. After graduating from secondary school Mironov got a job as a restorer-conservator at the museum of local history. He studied the restoration methods in Tartu.

Later Mironov was drafted for compulsory army service. He served for two years in the anti-aircraft missile troops. In 1974 he returned from service with a damaged nervous system that doctors said will take over a year to restore. Despite this, Mironov managed to pass entry exams and enroll as a student at the Mendeleev Institute of Chemical Technology in Moscow. Finding it too difficult to comply with the Soviet curriculum that included the history of the Communist Party of the USSR, he left within a year.

== Samizdat and life of a dissident ==
From 1975, Mironov was closely involved in copying and distributing banned literature or samizdat. Nearly a decade later, in 1984, Mironov was arrested for distributing samizdat and for his contacts with foreigners (mostly students at the Pushkin State Russian Language Institute). Mironov later discovered that he was also suspected by the government of espionage. The lengthy investigation that followed included extreme interrogations, torture by sleep deprivation and 35 days in an isolation cell or the kartser.

== Political prisoner ==
In 1985, Mironov was sentenced under Article 70 by the Supreme Court of Udmurtia to four years in a labour camp and three in internal exile. He was sent to a camp for political prisoners in the Dubrovlag chain of camps in Mordovia. In February 1987, however, he was released following pressure from the West.

== Career ==
After his release Mironov got heavily involved in promotion of human rights and worked tirelessly at helping with the release of the remaining political prisoners. In 1988 Mironov joined the human rights centre ‘Memorial’. He specialised in identifying weapons banned from use in civilian areas such as thermobaric weapons including 'vacuum bombs'. The work of proving the military's illegal use of such weapons often brought him to conflict areas both in Russia and abroad.

Mironov reported from the Russian republic of Chechnya during both the 1994 and 1999 wars, and also Afghanistan. He set up a series of confidential meetings in western Europe between Russian and Chechen politicians, for European diplomatic mediation of the Russo-Chechen conflict. Mironov worked in his career with foreign journalists from many media outlets covering war and injustice. He had a long friendship and fruitful collaboration with Italian filmmaker Giorgio Fornoni. Andrei worked as a fixer/producer on a number of Fornoni's documentaries including a film on "Siberian" anthrax.

Mironov had a longstanding interest in Initiatives of Change (formerly called Moral Re-Armament), a movement dedicated to applying moral and spiritual principles in public life that had a record of promoting reconciliation in troubled parts of the world. Mironov's involvement in it started when he met one of its Norwegian representatives, Leif Hovelsen, on a visit he made to Moscow in April 1989. Hovelsen had been active in the Norwegian Resistance during World War II, and was arrested and tortured by the Gestapo. In prison he had powerful spiritual experiences he later described in Out of the Evil Night (1959). He believed that it was important not to respond to evil with evil, and after the war embarked on trying to build bridges with Germany. Mironov was impressed by Hovelsen's experience and message, and often translated for him on his many visits to Moscow over the ensuing decades. Mironov also translated for another Russian who supported Initiatives of Change, the philosopher Grigory Pomerants, on some of his visits to Initiatives of Change conference centre in Caux, Switzerland. He came to admire Pomerants's outlook and philosophy of life.

== Attack in Moscow ==
Mironov was violently attacked in his home on 3 June 2003 by a former member of the Russian police forces. The attack left him unconscious, with four open wounds as well as serious brain damage that prevented him from returning to work. Mironov reported what had happened on 5 June 2003, two days after the attack, at a police station.

In September, Mironov discovered that the police had refused to register his complaint and cleared the person responsible for the attack. Viacheslav Igrunov, a member of the Duma at the time, wrote to the Public Prosecutor of Moscow, the Public Prosecutor of the district responsible for the inquiry, and the Chief of Police of Moscow to denounce this serious failing on the part of the authorities. For its part, the 'Frontline Defenders' human rights association referred the Mironov affair to the Attorney General of Russia. On 6 January 2004, the Russian judicial authorities decided not to pursue the criminal inquiry, on the basis of a police report stating that Mironov's injuries were very slight, despite all the medical files produced by Mironov proving otherwise. The acts of intimidation against Mironov continued until he was admitted to a neurological clinic in Germany on 11 January 2004. With medical help provided in Europe, Mironov gradually returned to health and resumed his work as a human rights activist, reporter and fixer.

== Death ==
Mironov's final assignment was to eastern Ukraine. The last article authored by Andrei Mironov accompanied by photographs of his colleague and friend Italian photojournalist Andrea Rocchelli, recorded the trauma of children under fire, before the journalists set off to cover the presidential elections in Sloviansk. Both journalists were killed 24 May after apparently being caught in crossfire between separatist fighters and the Ukrainian Army troops near Sloviansk. French photographer William Roguelon, sole survivor of the reporters traveling together, said that the group was targeted by mortars and automatic weapons from Karachun hill. The National Guard of Ukraine and the Ukrainian army were stationed there. After Mironov's death, social activist and contender for the 2010 Nobel Peace Prize Svetlana Gannushkina described him as a person with a "crystal clear soul, absolute unselfishness, a limitless, uncompromising sense of justice, a remarkable kindness and belief in goodness". The OSCE called for the investigation into the journalists' deaths.

In 2016 Italian prosecutors opened inquiries that led to the arrest of Ukrainian and Italian National Guard soldier Vitalii Markiv. On 3 November 2020, the Milan Court of Appeal, while holding the Ukrainian armed forces accountable of the killing of the journalists, acquitted Vitalii Markiv of all charges

Mironov is survived by his mother, Yevgeniya Mironova, and two brothers, Alexander and Alexei Mironov.

== Awards ==
- 2008 – Pierre Simon prize for ethics and society. Awarded annually under the auspices of the French Ministry of Health
- 2014 – Prize "Camertone" in the name of Anna Politkovskaya, awarded posthumously to journalists for courage and professionalism
