= Olha Aivazovska =

Ukrainian activist

- Ольга Павлівна Айвазовська
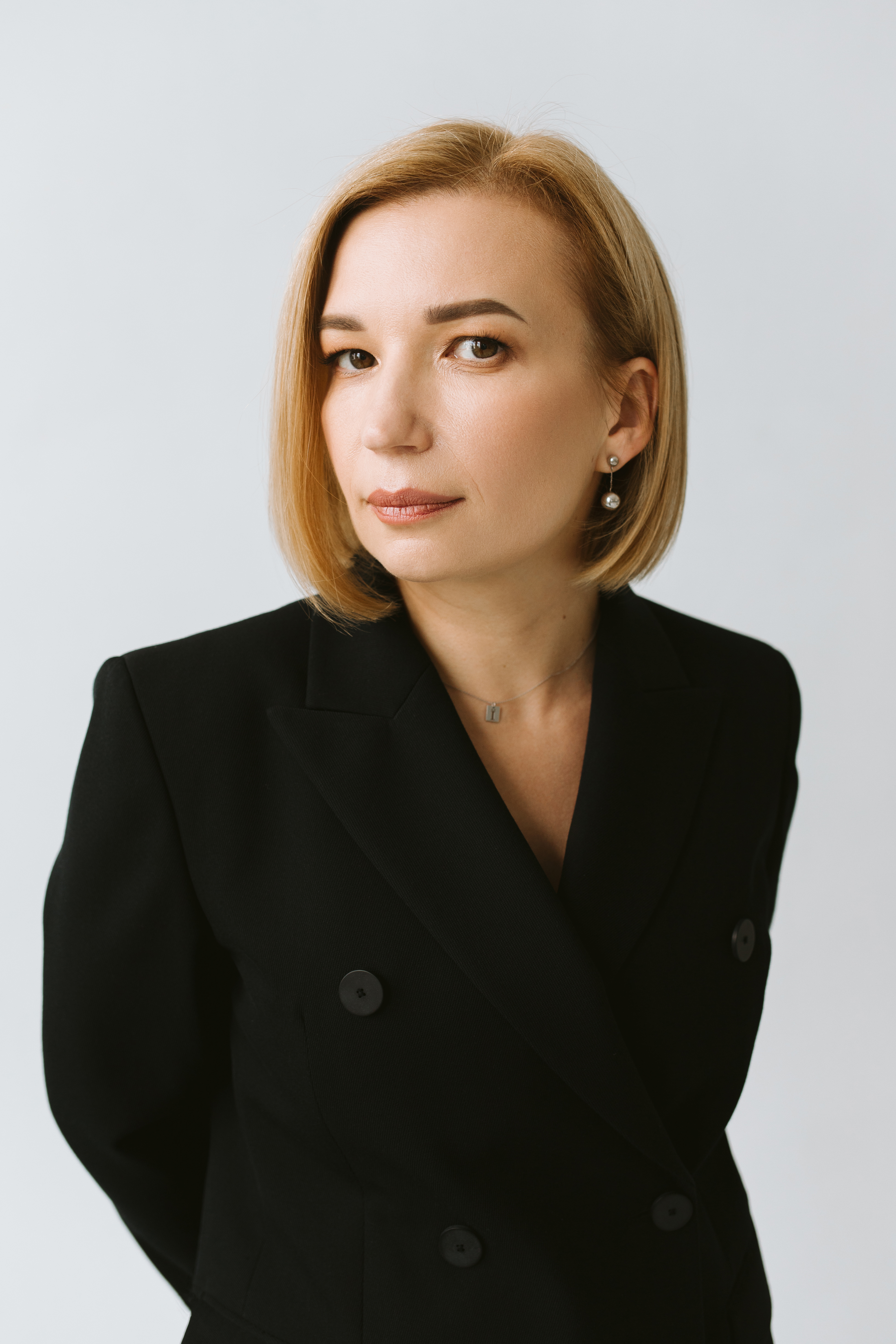
- Born: February 9, 1981 (age 45)
- Citizenship: Ukraine
- Education: Cherkasy National University; Stanford University; Taras Shevchenko National University of Kyiv
- Occupation: Civil society activist
- Organization: International Centre for Ukrainian Victory (ICUV)

Olha Pavlivna Aivazovska (Ukrainian: Ольга Павлівна Айвазовська; born 9 February 1981 in Zalishchyky Raion, Ternopil Oblast), is a Ukrainian civil society activist. As a member and chair of the board of the non-governmental organisation OPORA, she was and is primarily responsible for monitoring elections to ensure freedom and fairness. She also aided in negotiation on the Ukrainian side in the Trilateral Contact Group on Ukraine on the settlement of the military conflict in the Donbas from 2016 to 2018.

== Life ==
=== Education ===
Olha Aivazovska initially studied Ukrainian philology and anthropology, and journalism at the National Bohdan Khmelnytskyi University in Cherkasy. In 2016, she completed the Democracy and Human Rights Programme at the Centre for Democracy, Development, and the Rule of Law at Stanford University, California, as part of a Draper Hills Summer Fellowship that she was selected for. From 2020 onwards she studied law at the Graduate Institute of the Taras Shevchenko National University in Kyiv.

=== Leadership training ===
Aivazovska has participated in leadership training programmes, including a project at the Aspen Institute in Kyiv and the Ukrainian School of Political Studies (USPS), a joint venture by the Legislative Initiatives Laboratory and the Council of Europe. The project was launched in 2005 as part of the 10th anniversary of Ukraine's accession to the Council of Europe. The USPS aims to educate and network in hopes of creating a culture of public policy in Ukraine committed to the principles of fairness, trust and dialogue.

=== Election monitoring and political activity ===
Since 2001, Aivazovska has been involved in monitoring elections in Ukraine to ensure their validity. From 2000 to 2004, she was head of the regional public youth organisation "Young Enlightenment" in Cherkasy. In 2006, she became a member of the all-Ukrainian non-governmental organisation OPORA. In 2007 she became editor-in-chief of the all-Ukrainian daily newspaper OPORA's Point and in 2009 she became the chairperson of OPORA's board of directors. As of 2022 she remains in this position. Aivazovska led the election monitoring with roughly 25,000 activists in Ukraine and also participated in election monitoring in more than 10 distinct European countries. According to Focus, Aivazovska was on the list of the 100 most powerful women in Ukraine from 2014 to 2020 due to her position in the country's political and social life.

Since 2018, Aivazovska has been a member of the board of the International Renaissance Foundation. As chair of the board, she coordinates the OPORA network's political programmes in 89 countries and 9 regional members in Africa, Asia, Europe, Latin America and the Caribbean, the Middle East, and Africa. The organisations form this global network through non-partisan, community-based election observation activities to ensure the integrity of electoral processes, strengthen the accountability and provide scrutiny toward governments and political parties, reduce the potential for politically motivated violence and strengthen people's right to participate in government.

Since 2020, Aivazovska has been the head of the board at the Global Network of Domestic Election Monitors.

In December 2022, Aivazovska opened the 15th Annual Meeting on the implementation of the Declaration of Principles for International Election Observation, with a speech about the differences between Ukraine and Russia, and why the former needs to be supported.

In February 2023, Aivazovska, together with NGO OPORA, presented a document at the Munich Security Conference on the strategy of what measures should be taken against Russia to prevent it from attacking other countries again.

=== Trilateral Contact Group (Minsk) ===
From 2016 to 2018, Aivazovska aided in negotiations on the settlement of the military conflict in the Donbas as an expert on the Ukrainian side in the Trilateral Contact Group in Minsk.

=== International Centre for Ukrainian Victory ===
Since the Russian invasion of Ukraine on February 24, 2022, Aivazovska and Ukrainian civil society leaders Daria Kaleniuk, Olena Halushka, Hanna Hopko established the International Centre for Ukrainian Victory (ICUV). Olga is one of the main authors of the Manifesto for Sustainable Peace.

The ICUV aims to bolster international backing for Ukraine in resisting Russian aggression, and foster stronger relationships between Ukraine's civil society and the global community. It also provides support to Ukrainian activists and NGOs, while actively promoting a post-war reconstruction plan for Ukraine, encouraging its transformation and advocating for its aspirations to join the European Union and NATO. Aivazovska has made advocacy visits to Africa, Europe, the US, and the UK, and participated in international conferences, and was a speaker at the Warsaw Security Forum 2022.

Aivazovska has become a chief advocates for a special tribunal against the Russian president Vladimir Putin and his associates. She is leading a program that aims to document war crimes by the Russian military by speaking with refugees in Poland.
