= Andrea Rocchelli =

Italian photojournalist

- Born: 27 September 1983; Pavia, Lombardy, Italy
- Died: 24 May 2014 (aged 30); Sloviansk Raion, Donetsk Oblast, Ukraine
- Cause of death: Shrapnel
- Resting place: Pavia, Italy
- Occupation: Photojournalist

Andrea Rocchelli (27 September 1983 – 24 May 2014) was an Italian freelance photojournalist and founder of the independent photographers collective Cesura. He was killed during the Donbas war and Ukrainian authorities were accused by his partners for the killing.

== Biography ==
Rocchelli graduated in 2007 at the Polytechnic University of Milan where he was awarded a master's degree in Communications Design. Subsequently, he was trained by Magnum Photos photographer Alex Majoli. In 2008, with other four photographers, he founded Cesura, a photographic collective aiming to produce independent projects.

He worked as a freelance photojournalist with a diversified curriculum. He documented the Arab Spring in Libya and Tunisia, the violation of human rights in Kyrgyzstan and Ingushetia, the conditions of migrants in Southern Italy and organized crime. His principal interest had been eastern Europe and Russia. His photos have been published by a number of journals and magazines such as Le Monde, Newsweek, The Wall Street Journal, and Russian newspaper Novaya Gazeta.

When Rocchelli died, his first book, Russian Interiors, was about to be completed. The work was published posthumously by Cesura.

== Death ==
Rocchelli was killed in Andriivka, Ukraine, near Sloviansk, on 24 May 2014 while reporting on the war in Donbas. He was travelling with the human rights activist and interpreter Andrei Mironov (who also died in the attack), a French photo reporter, and a local driver. According to an Italian court when they stopped to take some pictures near a railway line, the group was attacked with automatic weapons and mortar fire from the "Karachun" hill, where the Ukrainian army was stationed.

The last pictures Rocchelli took before his death precisely document the attack that killed him and Mironov and permanently injured Roguelon. These photographs testify to the duration of the shootings, the morphology of the area, and the civilian clothing worn by the victims.

== Investigation and trial in Italy against Vitaly Markiv ==
William Roguelon, the sole survivor of the attack among the reporters, said that the group was targeted by mortars and automatic weapons from the Karachun hill, where the National Guard of Ukraine and the Ukrainian army were stationed.

The domestic inquiry carried out by the Ukrainian authorities explicitly did not attest any responsibility of the killings. The international rogatory issued by the Italian authorities did not bring any result due to the lack of cooperation, the substantial negligence and severe delay from the Ukrainian side. In July 2016, following the complaint of a lawyer appointed by the Rocchelli family, the Ukrainian Court of Sloviansk condemned the Ukrainian State for having violated article 6 of the European Convention on Human Rights, defining "Illegal the inactivity of the investigator with respect to the preliminary investigation in the criminal proceedings for the fact of intentional homicide [...] For violation of reasonable time limits in the preliminary investigation by action of the reasonable time limits for carrying out the inspection".

In the same year the Italian prosecutors, therefore, opened a second phase of the inquiries that led to the arrest of Ukrainian and Italian National Guard soldier Vitalii Markiv. Accused to contribute to the deaths of the two civilians, Markiv has been judged guilty by the Pavia court of justice on July 12, 2019, and condemned to serve 24 years in jail. The Ukrainian State was also sued as a civil defendant. The same sentence, furthermore, calls for the forwarding of the file concerning Commander Bogdan Matkiwsky for investigation by the Rome Prosecutor's Office because he is deemed the direct superior of Markiv during the operations that killed Rocchelli and Mironov.

Mr Markiv and the Ukrainian State made an appeal to the verdict and the II grade trial took place in fall 2020 in Milan court of justice. On November 3, 2020, the court, while holding the Ukrainian armed forces accountable of the killing of the journalists, acquitted Mr Markiv mentioning articles 605 and 530 II section of the Italian penal code (lack of evidence).

On February 16, 2021, the Attorney General's Office of Milan stated that will appeal the second degree acquittal of Vitalii Markiv. On 9 December 2021, the Supreme Court of Cassation fully acquitted Markiv, ending the trial.

== Exhibitions ==
2014, 4–9 September, Ukraina Revolution, curated by Cesura and Ilaria Alpi Association; Palazzo Graziani, San Marino, SM.

2014 September 20 – 2 November, Evidence, retrospective curated by photographer Gianluca Grossi and Cesura; Spazio Reale, Monte Carasso, Bellinzona, CH.

2015 June 5 – 5 July, Stories, retrospective curated by Cesura and Lucia Rocchelli; Palazzo del Broletto, Pavia, IT.

2015 September 30 – 15 November, Stories, retrospective curated by Cesura and 3/3; Museo di Roma in Trastevere, Rome, IT. 2017.

2017, 3–7 May, From the last front: the Ukraine of Rocchelli and Mironov, curated by Leonardo Brogioni; The Triennale Design Museum, Milan, IT. The exhibition was part of the International Human Rights Festival of Milan. 2017.

2017 November 23 – 2018 January 14, Andy Rocchelli: Letzte Front, curated by Miklos Klaus Rosza in collaboration with COOPI; Photobastei, Zurich, CH.

2019, January 7 – February 2, Voice of the Voiceless – photo stories by Andy Rocchelli, in collaboration with Cesuralab and Osteria Letteraria Sottovento, Pavia, Italy.

2020 October, Mostra Diffusa – Andy Rocchelli's photos exhibited in several places of Pavia. Curated by the association Volpi Scapigliate.

== Publications ==
Rocchelli's portrait of the feminine universe in the post-soviet era, Russian Interiors was published in late 2014. It has been positively reviewed by the international critique throughout the last years, e.g. it has been listed among the best 10 photobooks of 2014 by Martin Parr on the British Journal of Photography.

== Awards ==
2014 June 13. Photo prize Ponchielli 2014 dedicated to Andy Rocchelli, Milan, IT.

2014 September 7. Kamerton Prize to independent journalism conferred to Andy Rocchelli and Andrey Mironov. The prize is named after the Russian journalist Anna Politkovskaya, Moscow, RU.

2014 December. San Siro civic award assigned by the municipality of Pavia, IT.

2015 April 25 . World Press Photo, 2nd Prize of the section Portraits, Stories to the photowork Russian Interiors, Amsterdam, NL.

2015 June. OSCE dedicated a commemorative plate to Andy Rocchelli as a tribute to those fallen for OSCE values in areas of conflict, Parliament, Rome, IT.

2018, December 2, Prize for the professional activity given by the Pavia Chamber of Commerce.
