= Anti-Corruption Action Center =

Ukrainian non-governmental organization

- Established: 2012 (14 years ago)
- Types: association
- Country: Ukraine
- Website: antac.org.ua/en

The Anti-Corruption Action Center (AntAC; Ukrainian: Центр протидії корупції, romanized: Tsentr protydiyi koruptsiyi) is a Ukrainian non-governmental organization, founded in 2012, that aims to oppose corruption in Ukraine.

== Creation ==
The Anti-Corruption Action Center was founded in 2012. Vitaliy Shabunin and Daria Kaleniuk are two of the co-founders.

== Leadership ==
Vitaliy Shabunin was head of AntAC's executive board as of 2016. Daria Kaleniuk was executive director as of 2019.

== Street protests ==
AntAC activists have carried out protests wearing t-shirts with the slogan "Ukraine F*&k Corruption".

In 2015, AntAC was active in a car protest in front of President Petro Poroshenko's residence that called for Poroshenko to fire Prosecutor General of Ukraine Viktor Shokin. AntAC director Kaleniuk stated that Poroshenko was unwilling to fire because, according to her, "Poroshenko came of age in a system where the Prosecutor General was used as a weapon against political opponents, and Poroshenko remains determined to maintain control over this critical lever of power".

== Legislative actions ==
AntAC played in role in putting pressure on members of the Verkhovna Rada (parliament) that led to the creation of the National Anti-Corruption Bureau of Ukraine.

== Lutsenko and the Trump–Ukraine scandal ==
In 2014, following the Revolution of Dignity, Anti-Corruption Action Center saw Yuriy Lutsenko, who later became Prosecutor General of Ukraine, as an "ally" following Lutsenko's role in the Maidan protests. By 2015, according to AntAC director Daria Kaleniuk, the International Monetary Fund and the European Union trusted AntAC's analysis of corruption in Ukraine and were sceptical of the Ukrainian president and Verkhovna Rada.

By 2019, in relation to the Trump–Ukraine scandal, AntAC and nineteen other organisations described Lutsenko as having supported "grave corruption and human-rights violations in Ukraine".

=== Solomon–Dareniuk debate ===
In 2019, Prosecutor General of Ukraine Yuriy Lutsenko's criticism of AntAC and AntAC's criticism of Lutsenko were published in US newspaper The Hill in relation to the Trump–Ukraine scandal. The opinion piece by journalist John Solomon and the response by AntAC director Kaleniuk were published shortly after one another, in late March and early April. Solomon alleged that AntAC lacked independence from United States (US) and George Soros, in particular via funding. Kaleniuk responded with criticism of Lutsenko, arguing that Solomon's article was based on an interview with Lutsenko, who was severely criticised by AntAC. She stated that AntAC funding came from multiple European and US sources, and that 500 donations from Ukrainians had been received in 2018. Kaleniuk stated that AntAC was pleased that its "documented evidence" of corruption had "reached" European and US legal authorities. She stated that "without US assistance and support", the cycle of corruption and impunity would not be broken.

== 2022 Russian invasion ==
In March 2022, in relation to the 2022 Russian full-scale invasion of Ukraine, Kaleniuk pressured British prime minister Boris Johnson to implement a no-fly zone in Ukraine. AntAC stated in June 2022 that in relation to the 2022 invasion, six AntAC members became members of the Armed Forces of Ukraine. Other AntAC members campaigned for the provision of military aid to Ukraine, analysed 50 draft laws, and prepared amendments for 20 of the draft laws. AntAC claimed that most of its amendments were "taken into account" by Verkhovna Rada.

== Repression ==
In March 2016, the Prosecutor General of Ukraine started an investigation into AntAC. Kyiv Post described the investigation as having "triggered civil society's indignation".
