= Olena Halushka =

Ukrainian politician (born 1989)

- Олена Галушка
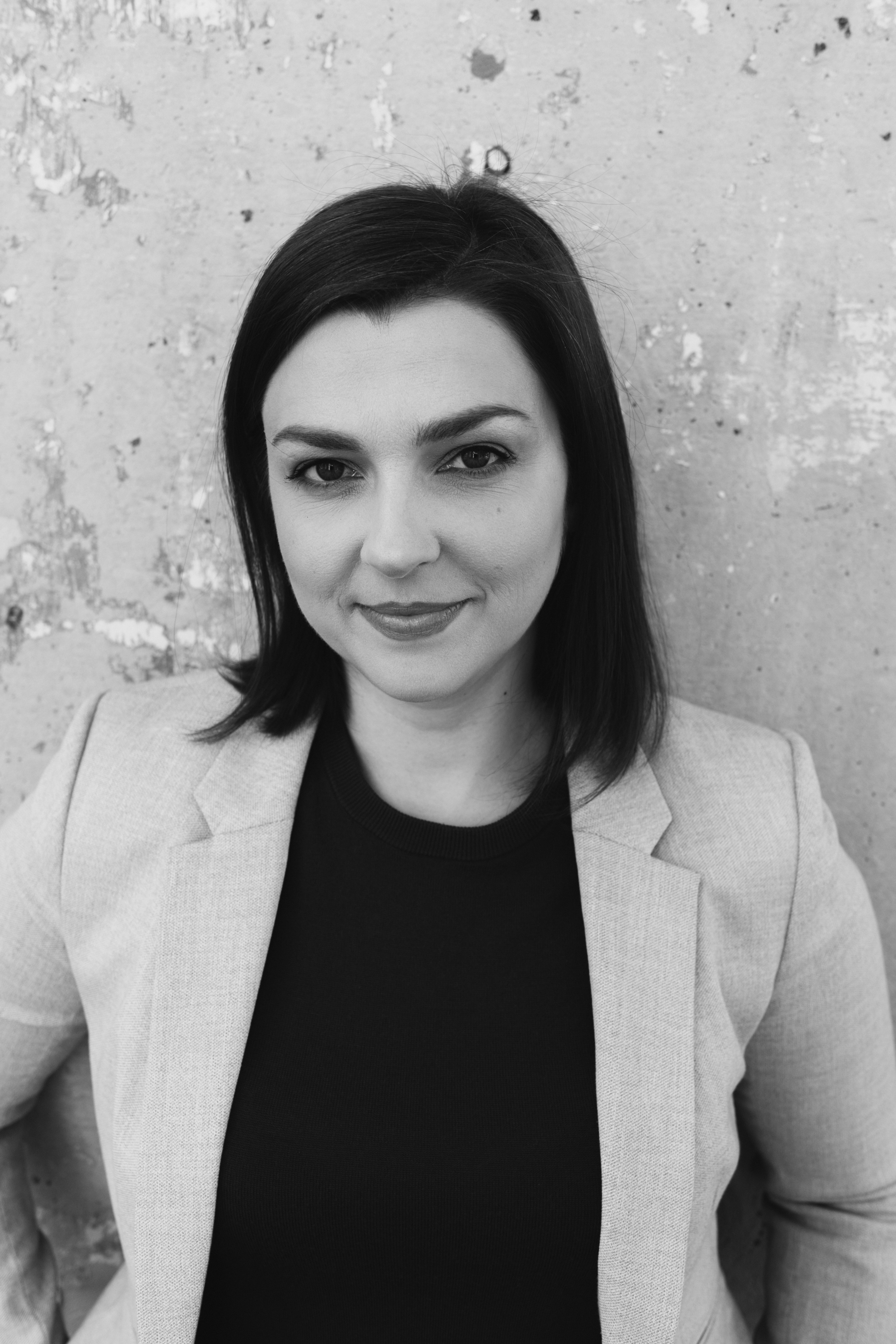
- Born: 28 February 1989 (age 37); Lviv, Ukraine
- Education: University of Lviv; National Academy of Sciences of Ukraine; Taras Shevchenko National University of Kyiv
- Occupations: Former member of the Kyiv City Council; Co-founder of the International Center for Ukrainian Victory (ICUV); Head of International Relations at Kyiv Anti-Corruption Action Centre

Olena Mykhailivna Halushka (born 28 February 1989) is a Ukrainian politician and activist. She was a member of the Kyiv City Council, a co-founder of the International Center for Ukrainian Victory (ICUV), and Head of International Relations at Kyiv Anti-Corruption Action Centre.

Halushka is a contributor to Ukrainska Pravda, the Atlantic Council, EUobserver, The Washington Post, Foreign Policy, and Foreign Affairs.

== Education ==
In 2005–2009, Olena studied at the University of Lviv, at the Faculty of Economics. From 2012 to 2016, she was a graduate student at the National Academy of Sciences of Ukraine and the Taras Shevchenko National University of Kyiv.

== Career ==
January 2010–November 2011: Deputy Executive Director for International Relations of Plast, the largest scout organization in Ukraine.

December 2011–November 2014: Parliamentary Assistant to the MP Lesya Orobets.

January 2015–May 2017: Head of the International Relations Department of the public association Reanimation Package of Reforms (RPR).

August 2017–January 2019: Head of the International Relations Department of the Ukrainian Leadership Academy. Since July 2017, Olena Halushka has been Head of the International Relations Department and a member of the Board of the NGO Anti-Corruption Center.

== Public and volunteer activities ==
Since 2001, she has been a member and instructor at Plast, a national scout organization of Ukraine.

In 2014, Halushka participated in the Revolution of Dignity and subsequently became a member of the Kyiv City Council and the deputy chair of the council's Commission on Housing and Energy.

During her tenure as a Council member, Olena advocated for the improvements in public utilities standards and engaged in educational activities on the topic. Since the beginning of the Russian invasion of Ukraine, Olena has been covering the war for an English-speaking audience. She has provided commentary to foreign media outlets, and her tweets have been repeatedly cited in international news media.

She actively promoted granting Ukraine a candidate status for the EU’s membership, as it would open up new tools for advocating reforms in the fight against corruption and contribute to the establishment of the rule of law in Ukraine.

Halushka advocates for the post-war reconstruction, in particular, she was a speaker at the Ukraine Recovery Conference in Lugano in 2022, during the hearings in the British Parliament committee, at the Designing Ukraine's Recovery in the Spirit of the Marshall Plan conference in Brussels, and at the Ukraine's Recovery conference hosted by Chatham House.

== International Center for Ukrainian Victory (ICUV) ==
After the beginning of the Russian invasion of Ukraine, Olena Halushka, together with her colleagues and the Kazimierz Pułaski Foundation, founded the International Centre for Ukrainian Victory (ICUV) in Warsaw. During the first months of the war, together with her team, she engaged in advocacy work which included meetings with U.S. congress members and U.S. Secretary of State Antony Blinken to expedite aid to Ukraine.

On October 25, 2022, Halushka spoke at the International Expert Conference on the Recovery, Reconstruction, and Modernization of Ukraine, which took place in Berlin and was attended by Chancellor of Germany Olaf Scholz and President of the European Commission Ursula von der Leyen. There, Olena was the sole representative of the Ukrainian civil society among over 30 speakers at the conference.

In total, in 2022, the ICUV team visited approximately 15 countries, conducting over 500 advocacy meetings in the United States, Germany, Spain, South Korea, Japan, Sweden, and other countries, involving over 1,000 high-ranking officials and diplomats.

In January 2023, Olena visited Japan to advocate for global consensus on supporting Ukraine's victory, discuss Russian threats to Ukraine's nuclear power plants, and further tightening of sanctions against Russia.

As part of ICUV's activities, Olena Halushka engaged in the advocacy campaign for Leopard 2 tanks and fourth-generation F-16 aircraft to be supplied to Ukraine.

=== Make Russia Pay campaign ===
Since 2023, Halushka has been a co-initiator of the international Make Russia Pay campaign, which advocates the confiscation of frozen Russian state assets in G7 and EU countries to support Ukraine’s reconstruction, compensate victims of Russian aggression, and strengthen Ukraine’s defense capabilities.

As part of the initiative, she has co-authored and reviewed a series of analytical briefs addressing legal, economic and political aspects of asset confiscation, including proposals for a Ukraine Restitution and Reconstruction Bank for active management of Russian Central Bank assets.

Her work and proposals have been discussed in international and Ukrainian media, including EUobserver and ZN.ua.

Halushka has also presented the campaign’s arguments at a number of international forums and parliamentary hearings, including events hosted by the European Parliament, Hudson Institute, the Italian Senate, the Lennart Meri Conference, and the Friends of Europe think tank.
