= Northern front of the Russian invasion of Ukraine =

Russian offensive in Ukraine

- Part of the 2022 Russian invasion of Ukraine
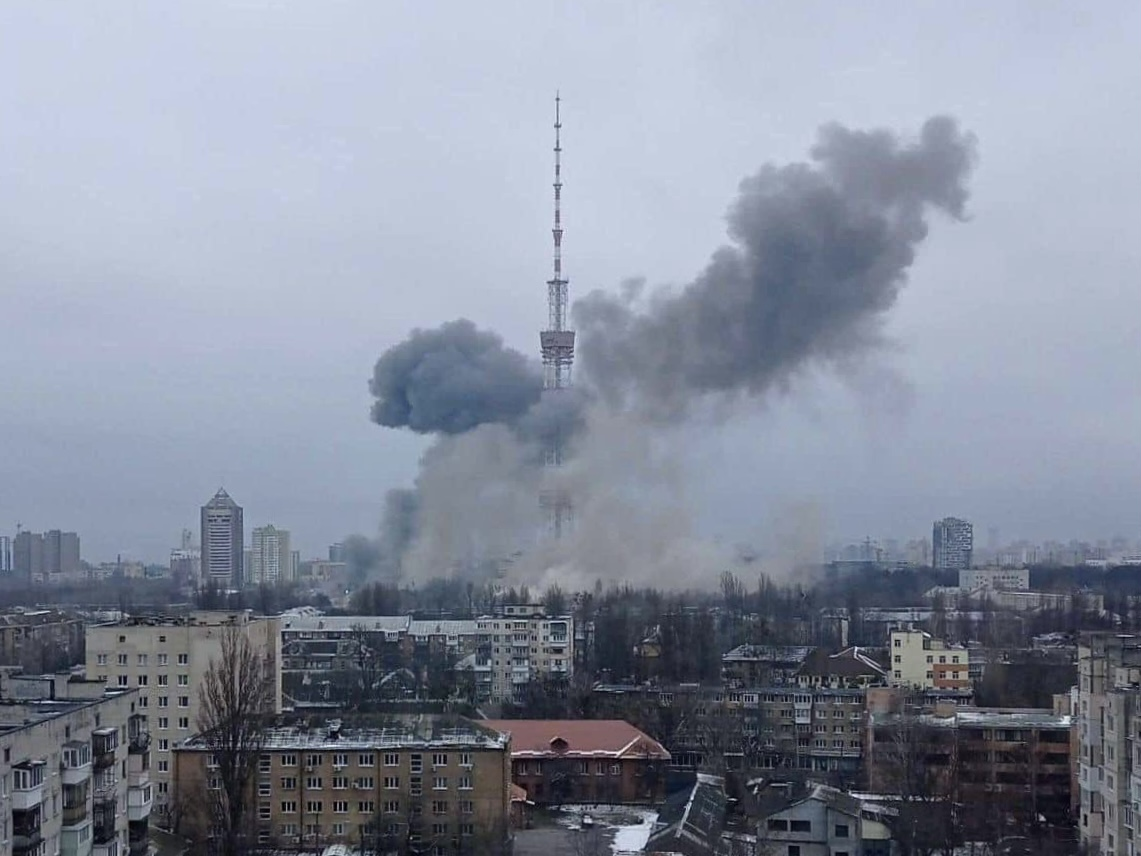
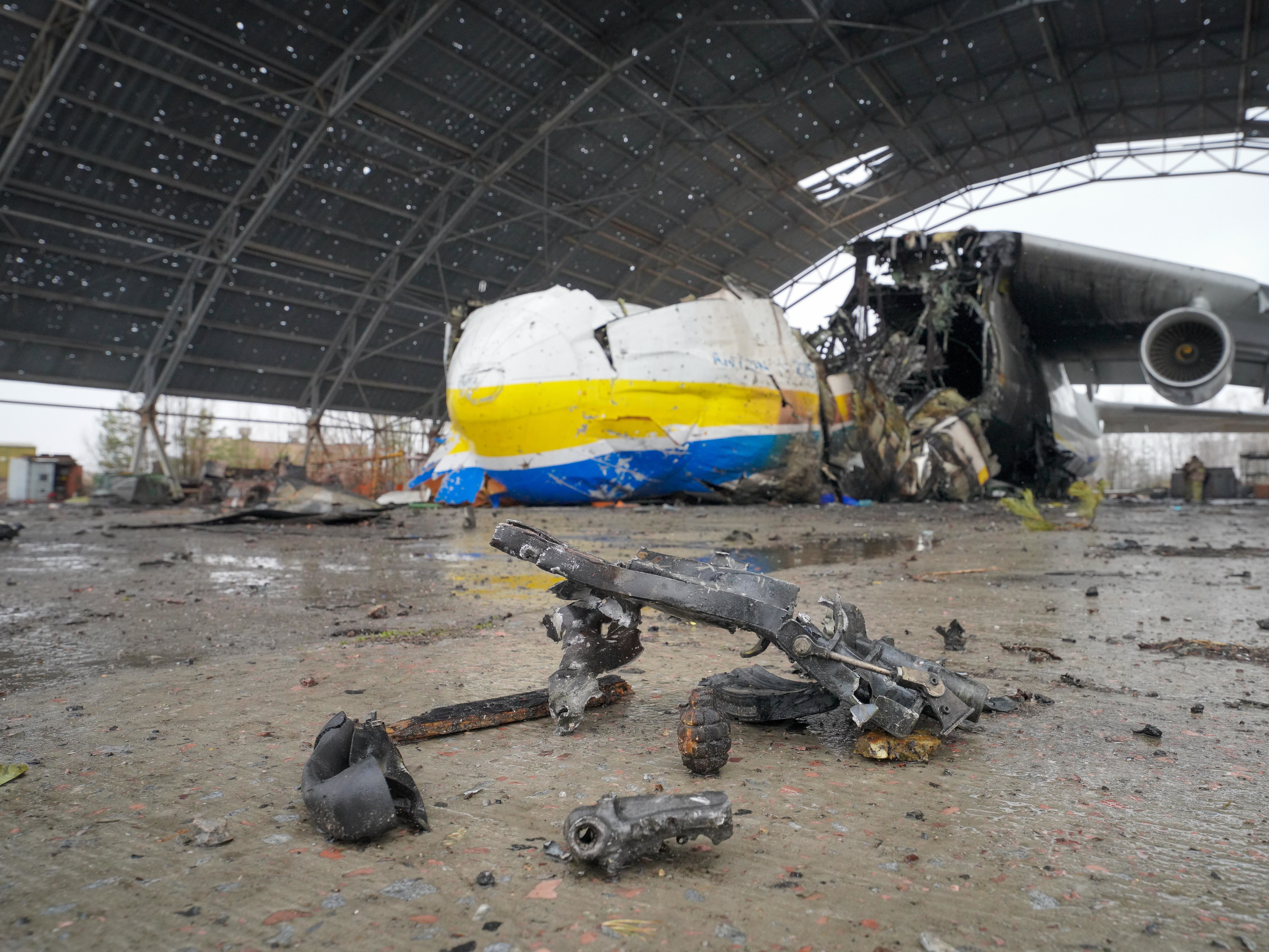
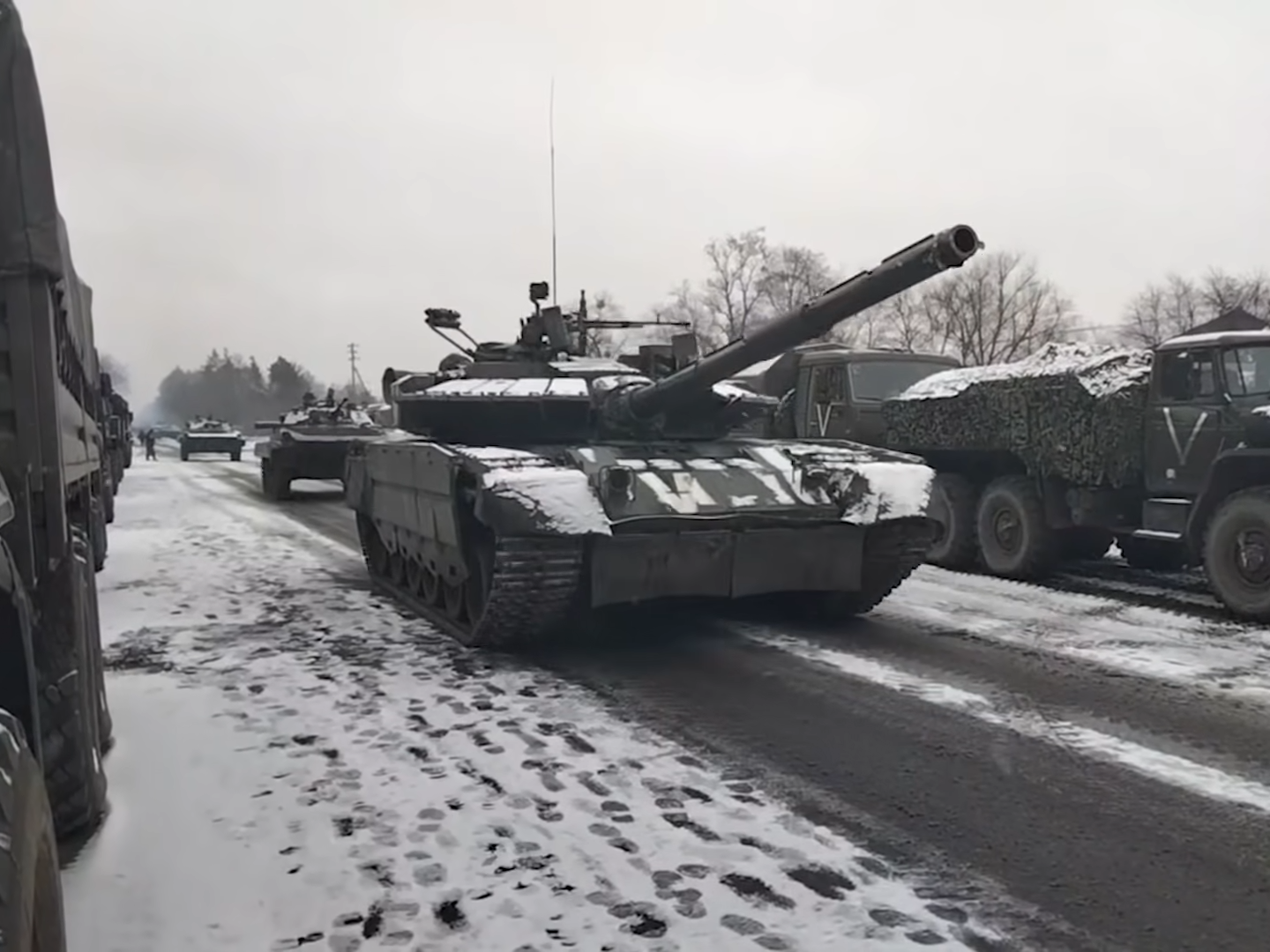
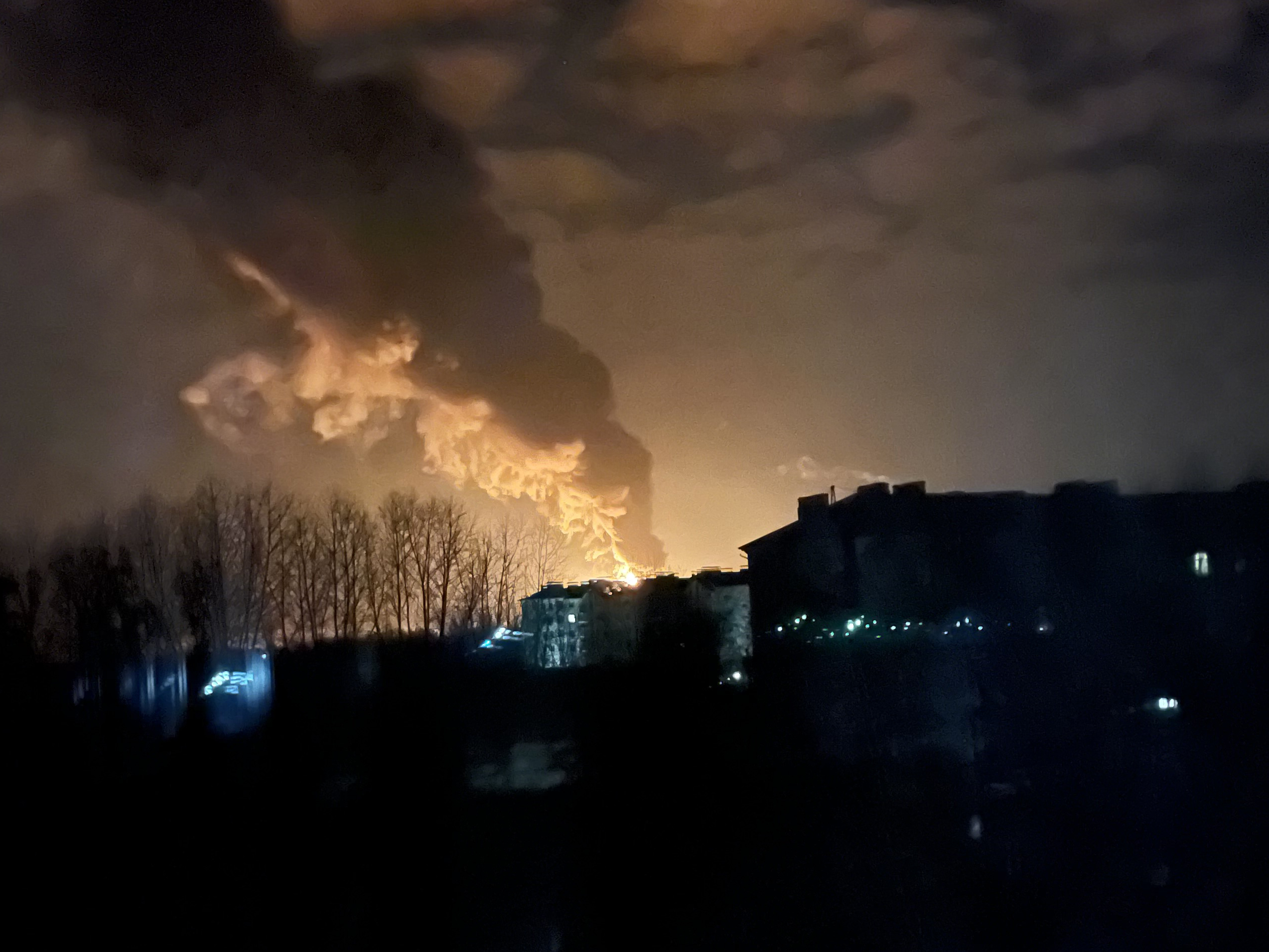
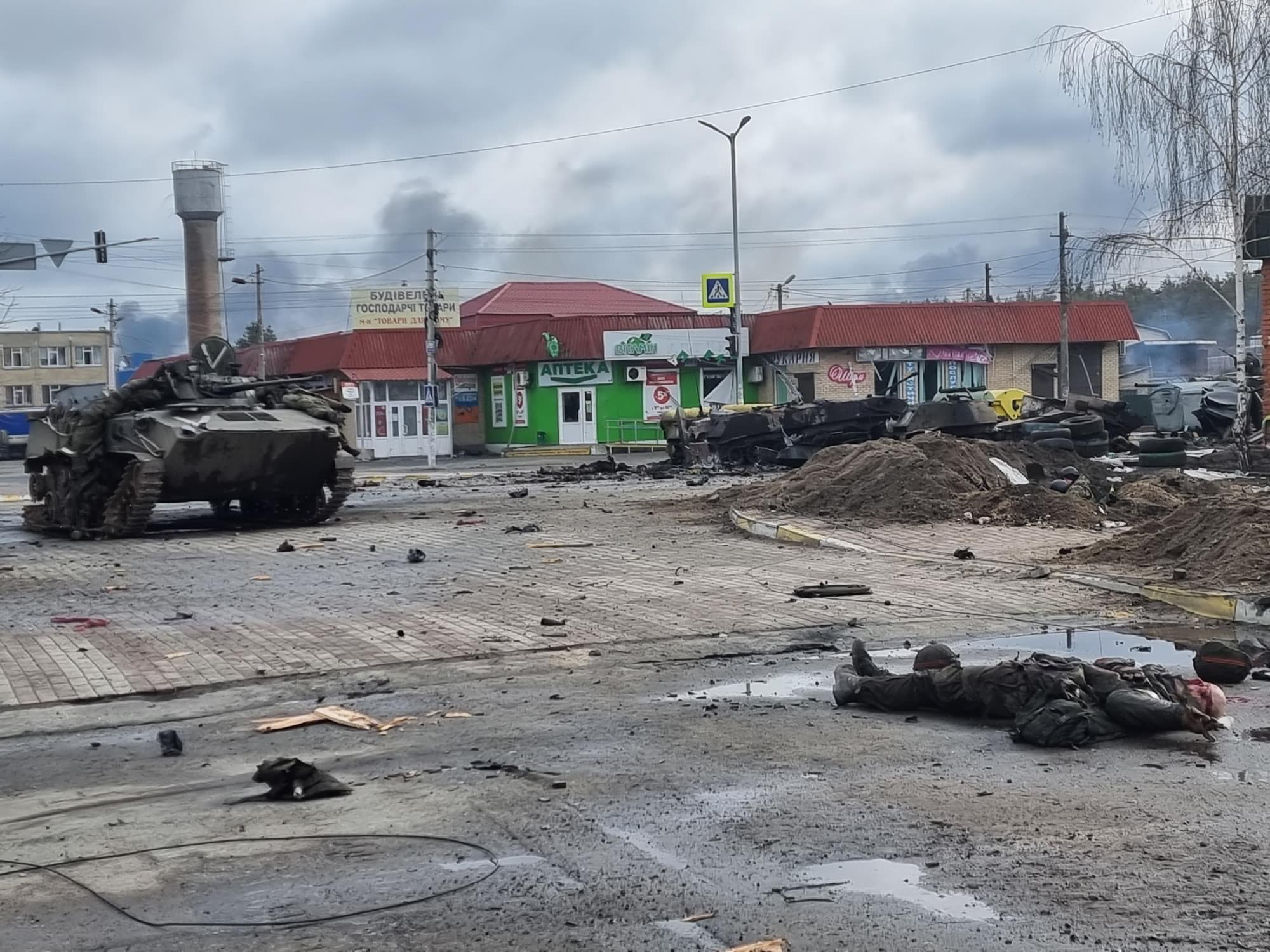
- Clockwise from top left: Russian bombardment of the Kyiv TV Tower during the battle of Kyiv; Wreckage of the Antonov An-225 Mriya following its destruction in the Battle of Antonov Airport; Petroleum depot on fire in Vasylkiv; Aftermath of a skirmish in the battle of Hostomel; Russian tank unit advances into the Kyiv Oblast
Date	24 February – 8 April 2022 (1 month, 2 weeks and 1 day)
Location	Kyiv, Chernihiv, Sumy, and Zhytomyr oblasts, Ukraine
Result	Ukrainian victory
Territorial changes	Ukrainian forces regain control of the entirety of the Kyiv, Sumy, Chernihiv, and Zhytomyr oblasts

Belligerents
Russia	Ukraine

Commanders and leaders
Aleksandr Chaiko	Volodymyr Zelenskyy

Units involved
1st Guards Tank Army; 35th Combined Arms Army; 36th Combined Arms Army; 90th Guards Tank Division; 11th Guards Air Assault Brigade; 31st Guards Air Assault Brigade; 141st Special Motorized Regiment; SOBR units; OMON units; PMC Redut	1st Tank Brigade; 58th Motorized Brigade; 72nd Mechanized Brigade; 93rd Mechanized Brigade; Georgian Legion; Sheikh Mansur Battalion; 40th Tactical Aviation Brigade; 95th Airborne Brigade; 112th Territorial Defense Brigade; Ukrainian Foreign Legion; 4th Rapid Reaction Brigade; Azov Special Operations Detachment; 49th "Carpathian Sich" Battalion

Strength
70,000 soldiers, 7,000 vehicles (total): 15,000–30,000 soldiers around Kyiv (Kyiv Convoy); Several hundred airborne troops; 1,500 Chechen soldiers; 700+ military ground vehicles (Kyiv Convoy); 220–234+ helicopters	20,000 soldiers 18,000+ irregulars

Casualties and losses
Per Ukraine: Heavy casualties At least ten planes shot down At least several helicopters shot down	530+ killed, 948+ wounded; 200+ captured; Su-27 fighter shot down; Antonov An-225 Mriya destroyed
- 1,589+ civilians killed

On 24 February 2022, as part of the 2022 Russian invasion of Ukraine, the Russian military crossed the Russia–Ukraine and Belarus–Ukraine borders into northern Ukraine, entering the oblasts (regions) of Kyiv, Chernihiv, Sumy, and Zhytomyr. The Russian operations in northern Ukraine were initially launched as an attempt to capture Kyiv, the capital of Ukraine and the seat of the Ukrainian government.

Russian forces initially captured several towns and cities, but logistical and supply failures, stiff Ukrainian resistance, and poor morale caused their advance to stall. With heavy losses and the inability to make further progress, Russia withdrew its forces from Kyiv, Zhytomyr, Chernihiv and Sumy oblasts in late March and early April 2022, and Ukrainian forces retook control.

== Campaign ==
=== Three-day war plan ===
Russia had reportedly hoped to take Kyiv rapidly and to remove the Ukrainian Government, allowing the installation of a pro-Russian government. Russia positioned a large force in Belarus, which crossed the border and invaded the north of Ukraine, while other forces attacked from the east of Ukraine (occupied territories of the Donbass) and from Crimea in the south.

After the start of the invasion, Ukrainian and Western analysts tentatively assessed that Putin seemed to have assumed that the Russian Armed Forces would be capable of capturing the Ukrainian capital city of Kyiv within several days. This assessment eventually led to the commonly reached conclusion that "taking Kyiv in three days" had been the original objective or expectation of the invasion.

Putin himself asserted back in 2014 that Russian forces "could take Ukraine in two weeks". Aleksandr Lukashenko had already stated that, in case of war, Kyiv would be taken in "3–4 days". Margarita Simonyan, editor-in-chief of the Russian state-controlled broadcaster RT, had made similar remarks about Russia being able to "defeat Ukraine in two days". The narrative of the planned "three day" capture of Kyiv was further reinforced on 2 March, when the Security Service of Ukraine (SBU) repeated the claim following its release of a video showing a captured Russian soldier claiming that his unit was sent into Ukraine with food supplies for only three days. Documents found inside Russian tanks mention how the "special military operation" would conclude in ten days. Ukraine also captured "flagship" tanks – as used in parades – along with military parade uniforms, suggesting that Russia expected to stage a victory parade in Kyiv after a quick conquest. Three days after the invasion began, RIA Novosti, a Russian state news agency, mistakenly published an article entitled "Russia's Coming and the New World," which was prepared in advance in anticipation of a Russian victory. It announced that Russia had won the Russo-Ukrainian war and that "Ukraine had returned to Russia". Zelenskyy also said that he had received an ultimatum to be replaced with Viktor Medvedchuk.

=== Russian advance on Kyiv ===
On the morning of 24 February 2022, Russia initiated attacks on Kyiv Oblast with artillery and missile strikes on several primary targets, including Boryspil International Airport, Kyiv's primary airport. Russia apparently intended to rapidly seize Kyiv, with Spetsnaz infiltrating the city, supported by airborne operations and a rapid mechanised advance from the north. Russian Airborne Forces attempted to seize two key airfields near Kyiv, launching an airborne assault on Antonov Airport, followed by a similar landing at Vasylkiv, near Vasylkiv Air Base south of Kyiv, on 26 February.

The attacks were unsuccessful due to several factors, including the disparity in morale and performance between Ukrainian and Russian forces, the Ukrainian use of sophisticated man-portable weapons provided by Western allies, poor Russian logistics and equipment performance, the failure of the Russian Air Force to achieve air superiority, and Russian military attrition during their siege of major cities. As Russian forces advanced towards Kyiv, Ukrainian president Volodymyr Zelenskyy warned that "subversive groups" were approaching the city. The Ukrainians also claimed that at the beginning of the invasion, just 30 SOF soldiers managed to halt the Russian attack. The Ukrainians ambushed the Russian convoy, guarded by some 2,000 troops, and destroyed three lead vehicles, attacked the rest of the convoy, destroying the bridges in the process. This engagement ended up temporarily stalling the entire Russian advance from Belarus, which consisted of 70,000 soldiers and 7,000 vehicles.

Wagner Group mercenaries and Chechen forces reportedly made several attempts to assassinate Zelenskyy. The Ukrainian government said these efforts were thwarted by anti-war officials in Russia's Federal Security Service (FSB), who shared intelligence of the plans.

Russian forces trying to capture Kyiv advanced south towards the city from Belarus on 24 February, reportedly in an attempt encircle the city from the west. Two supporting axes of attack from Russia through Chernihiv Oblast and Sumy Oblast were intended to encircle Kyiv from the northeast and east, respectively.

The attack force reached the Chernobyl Exclusion Zone and captured the Chernobyl Nuclear Power Plant and the ghost city of Pripyat. Russian vehicles had also broke through the border checkpoint at Vilcha by noon. Following their breakthrough at Chernobyl, Russian forces were held at Ivankiv, a key town between the border and Kyiv. United States Secretary of Defense Lloyd Austin revealed that some Russian mechanized infantry units had advanced to within 20 miles (32 km) of Kyiv on the first day of the offensive. In the morning of 25 February, Ukraine's military said its airborne forces were fighting near the settlements of Dymer and Ivankiv, where a large amount of Russian armored vehicles had advanced. The Ukrainian forces destroyed a bridge over the Teteriv River at Ivankiv, claiming to have halted the Russian columns, though it was soon reported that 80 Russian vehicles were moving through Dymer and the neighboring village of Katiuzhanka.

On the morning of 27 February, a large convoy of Russian vehicles more than 4.8 kilometres (3 miles) long was seen on satellite images on a road near Ivankiv heading towards Kyiv. By 28 February, the convoy had grown to around 64 kilometres (40 miles) long.

The Russian advance was greatly hindered by logistical difficulties, partially caused by the Belarusian opposition, as dissident railway workers, hackers and security forces disrupted railway lines in Belarus. This operation, known as the 2022 rail war in Belarus, was mainly organized by individuals and three larger networks known as "Bypol", the "Community of Railway Workers", and the "Cyber Partisans".

==== Antonov Airport occupied ====
At 8:00 a.m. local time on 24 February 2022, 20 to 34 Russian military helicopters (Mil Mi-8 transport helicopters escorted by Ka-52 "Alligator" attack helicopters) flew south from the Belarus–Ukraine border and approached the town of Hostomel. The helicopter group reportedly carried around 300 VDV airborne troops, purportedly from the 11th Guards Air Assault Brigade or 31st Guards Air Assault Brigade for an assault on Antonov Airport nearby.

The assault was an attempt to secure the site as an airbridge for Russian transport troops and heavy equipment (such as artillery and tanks) for an invasion on Kyiv proper. The helicopter group was met by attacks from Ukrainian small arms and MANPADS. The attack eventually downed one to three helicopters, with their pilots ejecting. Despite the attacks, the airport was ultimately captured on 25 February as the significantly outnumbered and outgunned members of the Ukrainian National Guard withdrew.

After the capture of the airport, Russian troops began to prepare for the arrival of 18 Ilyushin Il-76 transport aircraft with reinforcements for the assault. However, local militias and troops from the 3rd Special Purpose Regiment attacked the airport, hampering Russian efforts. The Ukrainian 4th Rapid Reaction Brigade, in a decisive counterattack, prevented the transport aircraft from landing at the airport, forcing it to return to Russia, and preventing further reinforcements. With air support from the Ukrainian Air Force, Ukrainian units managed to repel the airborne assault. Russian forces also attempted landings at the Kyiv Cistern.

A renewed airborne assault was launched a day after the initial attack. Russian forces were able to advance and capture the airport after a combined ground-based assault. Despite their success, the airport was deemed inoperable, ending chances for a swift Ukrainian capitulation via the capture of Kyiv. During the clash at Antonov Airport, the only existing Antonov An-225 Mriya (the world's largest operational aircraft) was destroyed in its storage hangar. The Russian government claimed nearly 200 Ukrainian deaths in the assault with no losses of its own. However, according to both Western and Ukrainian sources, an estimated 300 Russian paratroopers were killed during the battle.

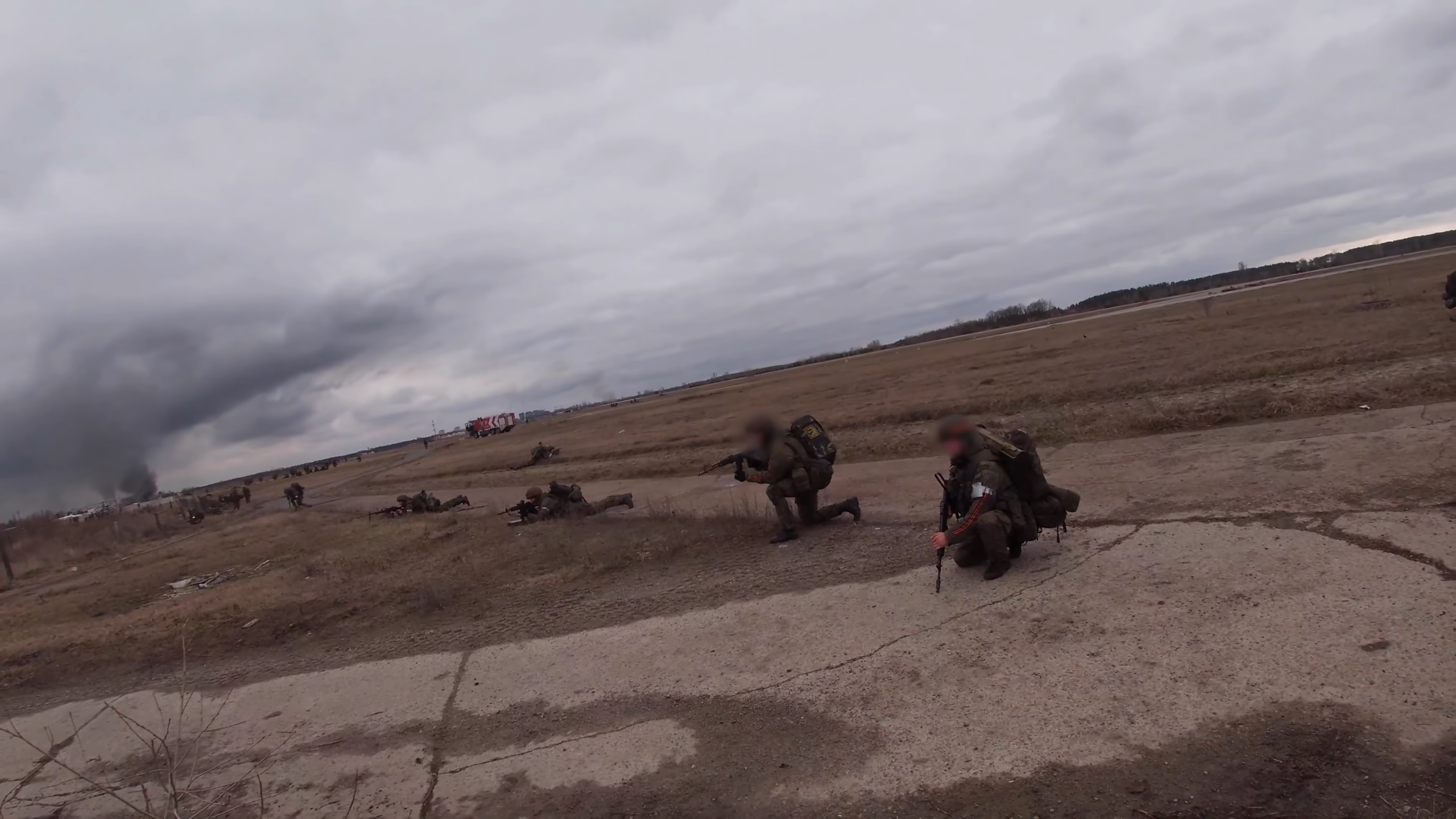
Russian airborne troops at Antonov Airport.

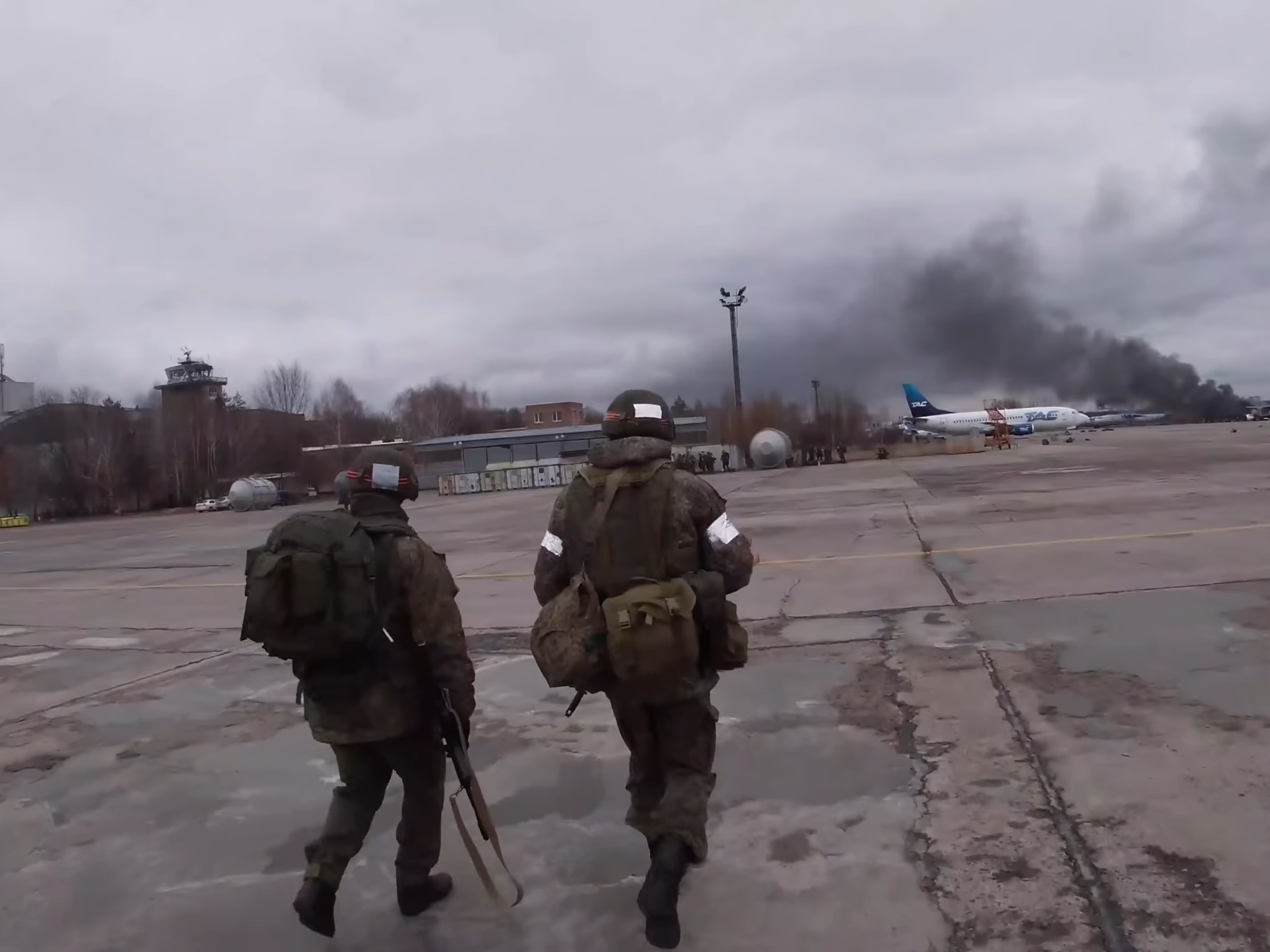
Russian airborne troops attempting to capture the airport.

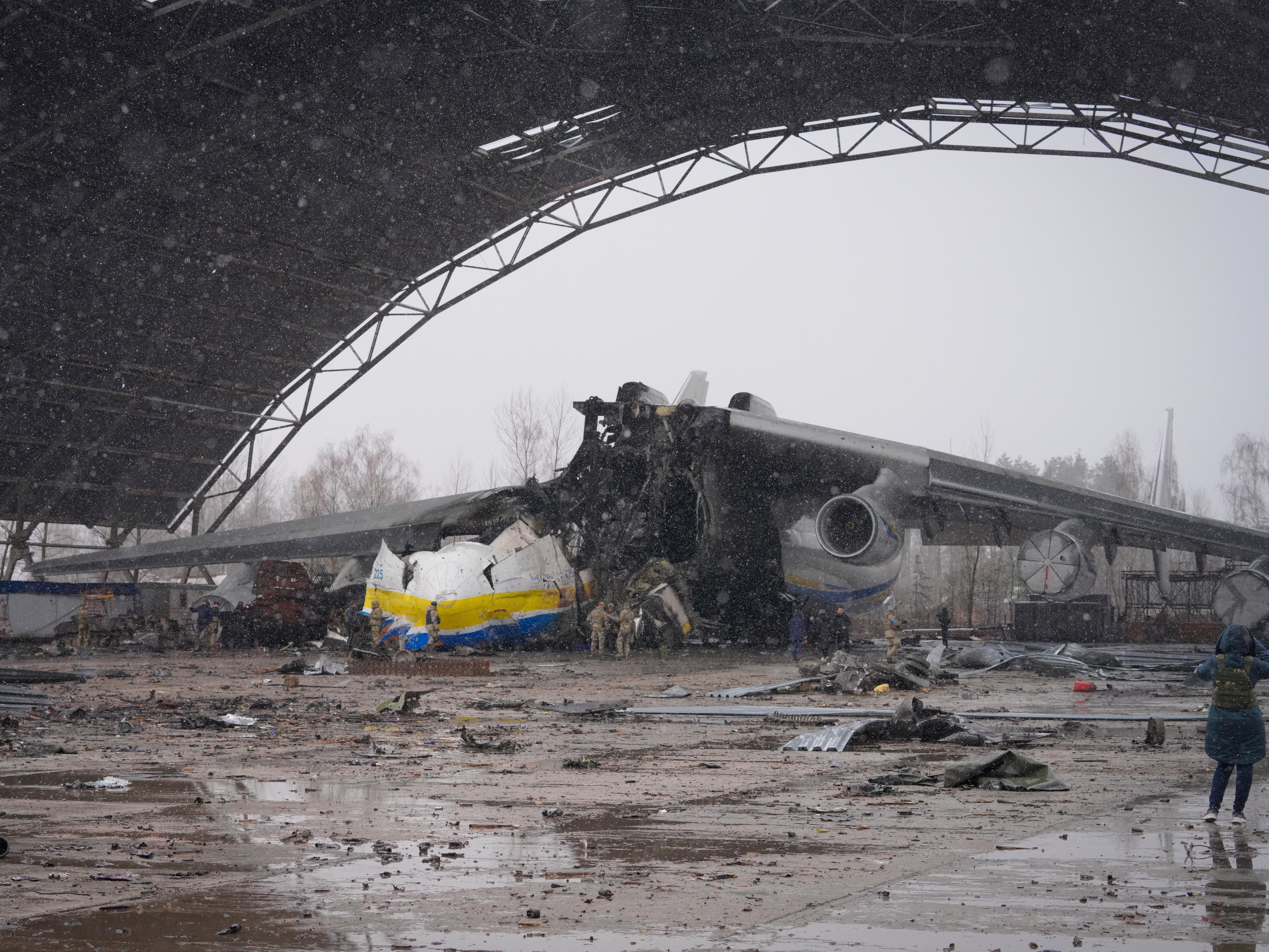
Remains of the Antonov An-225 following its destruction at Antonov Airport.

==== Hostomel ====
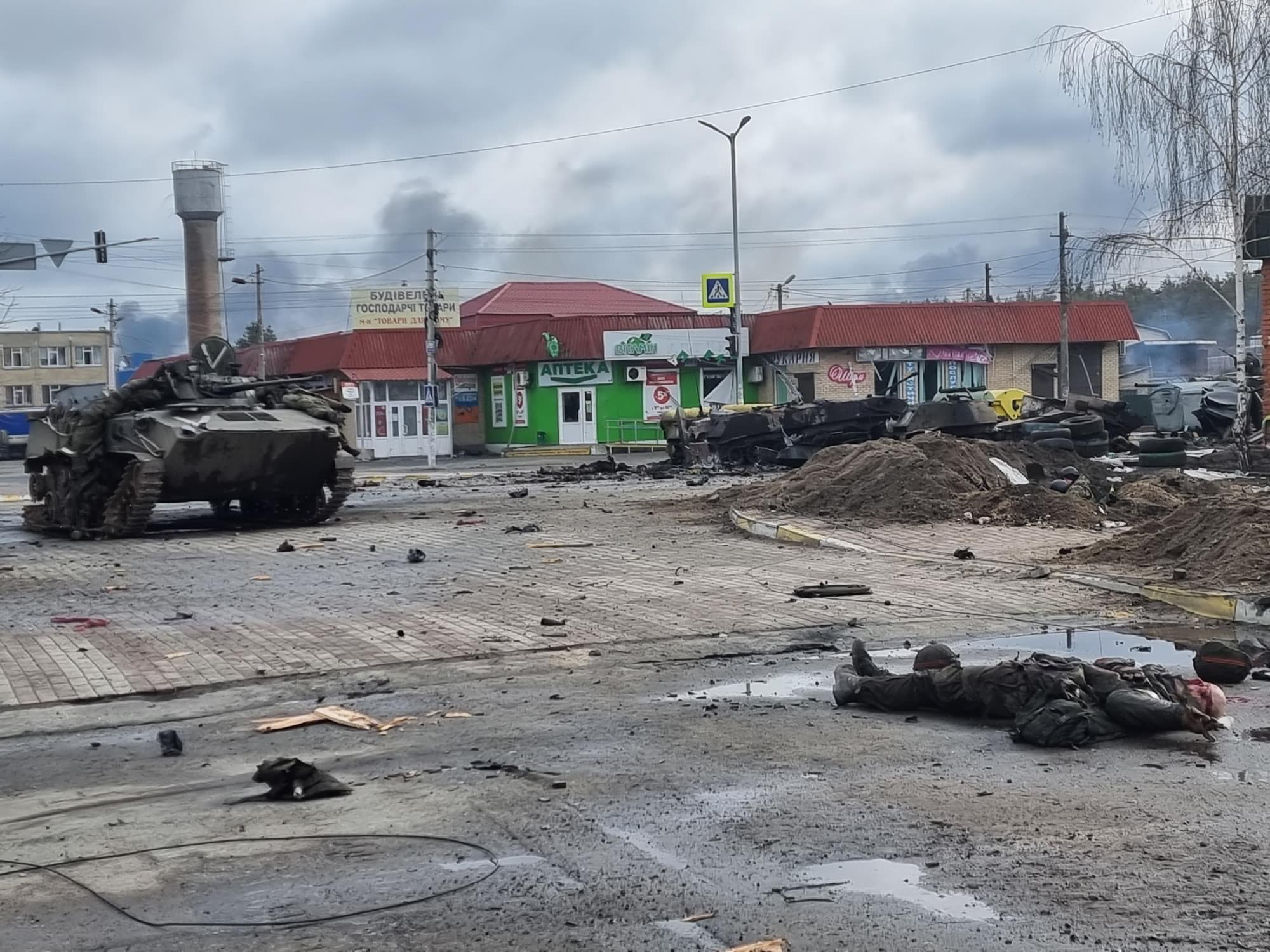
The aftermath of clashes in Hostomel

On 26 February, according to Ukrainian sources, Ukrainian strikes near the Hostomel airport resulted in the death of 141st Motorized Regiment commander Magomed Tushayev and the "destruction" of a "strike group" which had been ordered to assassinate Zelenskyy.

In late February 2022, Russian forces attempted to set up checkpoints within the city of Hostomel, but were forced to move back towards the airport by Ukrainian forces.

On 3 March, the Defense Intelligence of Ukraine (DIU) claimed that its forces were engaged in battles for the city of Hostomel, and claimed to have destroyed twenty Russian military vehicles, including ten at the city's glass factory. Major Valeriy Chybineyev of the Defense Intelligence was killed at Hostomel the same day. The next day, the DIU announced that a special forces group under its command, which also included the 3rd Special Forces Regiment and a local resistance group, had restored control over Hostomel, and that over fifty members of Russia's 31st Air Assault Brigade had been killed in action during the battles. An advisor to Zelenskyy claimed that Russian forces retook control of Hostomel and Bucha on 5 March.

==== Vasylkiv ====
It has been reported that, on 26 February 2022, Russian paratroopers began an assault on Vasylkiv, 40 kilometres (25 mi) south of Kyiv, to capture a military airbase nearby. A large group of Russian paratrooper units were alleged to have landed near Vasylkiv, despite anti-aircraft fire. The units then advanced to the city and were involved in heavy fighting with the Ukrainian 40th Tactical Aviation Brigade, and were repulsed. The city's mayor, Natalia Balasinovich, claimed over 200 Ukrainians were injured during the fight. The New York Times cited reports by unnamed Ukrainian officials, that at least part of the attackers were sleeper agents who had bought apartments in the city the month before the invasion.

Claims have been made that Ukrainian aircraft shot down two Russian Ilyushin Il-76 aircraft transporting assault troops. However, The Guardian reports "no convincing public evidence has surfaced about the two downed planes, or about a drop of paratroopers in Vasylkiv". Ukrainian territorial defense units combed the woods and surrounding countryside and found no plane wreckage.

In the early morning of 27 February, a Russian missile struck an oil depot in Vasylkiv, setting it ablaze. On 12 March, a Russian rocket attack destroyed the air base.

==== Battle of Kyiv ====
On 25 February, Russian fighter aircraft began bombarding central Kyiv. A Ukrainian Su-27 was then shot down. Russian saboteurs dressed as Ukrainian soldiers attempted to infiltrate Obolon, a suburb north of central Kyiv, just 10 kilometres (6.2 miles) from the Verkhovna Rada building (the seat of the Ukrainian parliament), but were all captured or killed by Ukrainian troops. Army reserves were then activated to defend Kyiv. Gunfire, described by Ukrainian officials as clashes between Ukrainian and Russian troops, was heard in several wards of the city. Zelenskyy urged residents to engage in urban guerrilla warfare with Molotov cocktails against Russian forces. Guns were distributed to civilian militias. The Ukrainian government imposed a curfew on the city the next morning. Ukrainian forces claimed to have killed around 60 Russian saboteurs in a single day.

Simultaneously with the failed assault on Vasylkiv, Russian units began bombarding Kyiv on 26 February with artillery and organized attacks to capture the Kyiv Hydroelectric Power Plant with muddled outcome. Ukrainian forces regrouped and struck a counter-offensive on the power plant the next day, repulsing Russian forces from the site. A separate attack on an army base in the city ended in failure. Russian forces were reported to be 31 kilometres (19 mi) from central-Kyiv.

Russian airstrikes were made on Vasylkiv and Kyiv on 27 February, including one on a radioactive waste disposal site near Kyiv, albeit the site was unharmed. Another Russian attack group began approaching Kyiv from the northeast after bypassing the city of Chernihiv. Vitali Klitschko, the mayor of Kyiv, told the Associated Press that Kyiv had been "completely encircled". However, his remarks were retracted shortly after. Missile attacks were reported at Brovary on 28 February, but Kyiv was relatively free from direct combat.

Ukrainian forces claimed the destruction of a Russian column in Makariv, where fighting had erupted one day earlier. Russian strikes continued in early March. The Kyiv TV Tower was hit on 1 March. Strikes were later reported at Rusanivka, Kurenivka, Boiarka, Vyshneve, Vorzel and Markhalivka. while Borodianka was extensively bombed, killing hundreds. The Ukrainian Air Force claimed it had downed two Russian Sukhoi Su-35 over Kyiv on 2 March. Makariv was recaptured on 3 March. Ukrainian reports from Kyiv believed the Russian army had begun to surround the city with tanks from Belarus, in an attempt to enforce a blockade. In early March 2022, the Ukrainians claimed the destruction of 120 tanks in one day, reportedly "when Russian tank columns stalled on roads to Kyiv, got hit with massed artillery barrages and modern anti-tank missiles dropped by plane-sized drones or fired by infantry teams."

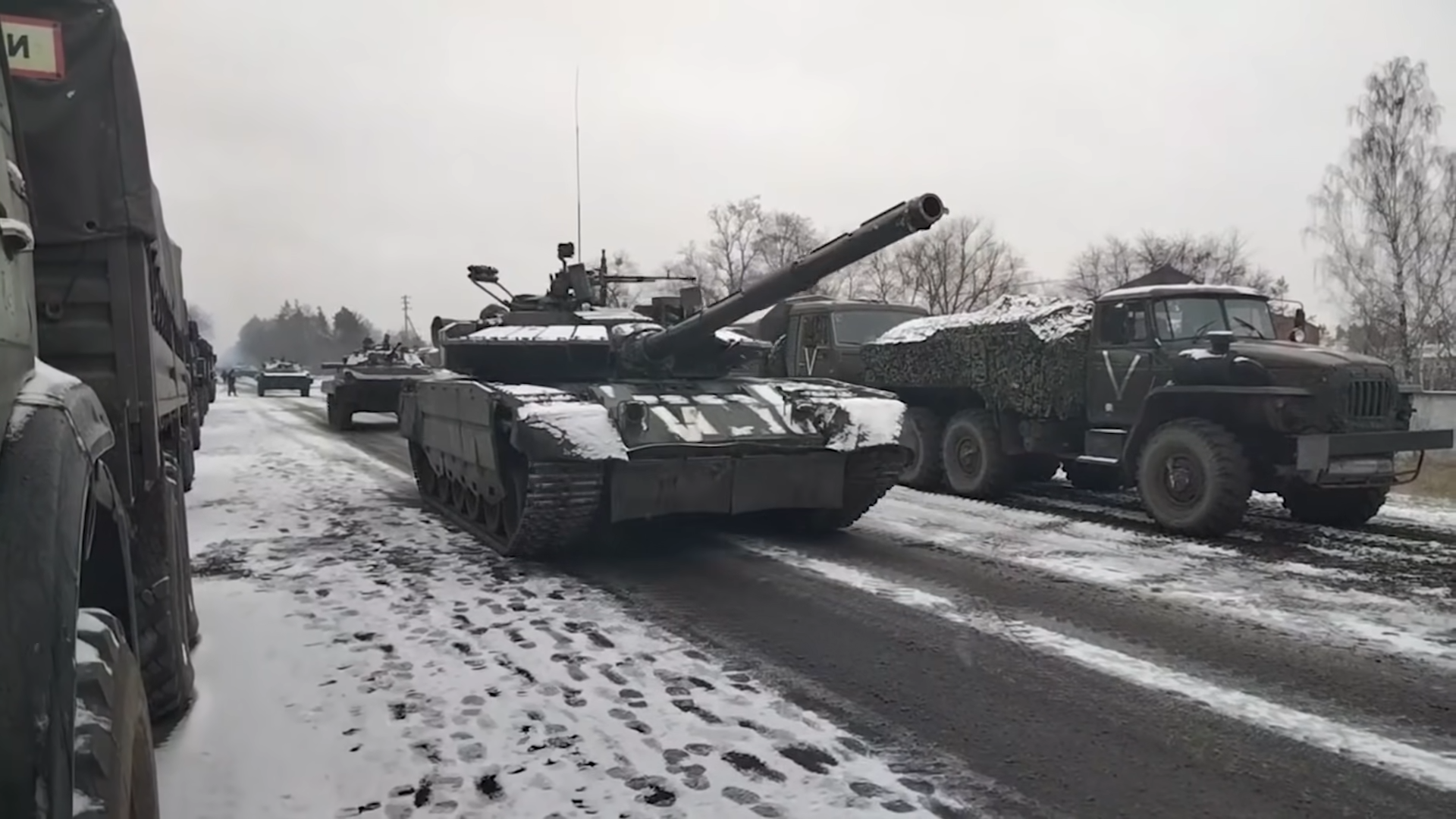
A Russian armored column near Kyiv, 7 March

Estonian intelligence estimated that the advancing Russian convoy would arrive at Kyiv in at least two days. On 4 March, an armored Russian column from the Sumy Oblast reportedly reached near Brovary. Clashes remained throughout the Kyiv Oblast by 8 March. Russian forces advanced on the highway between Zhytomyr and Kyiv, threatening Fastiv. Russian tanks reached within a few kilometres from Kyiv on 9 March, but were attacked by Ukrainian forces during the night.

On 10 March, Ukrainian forces claimed that the Azov Special Operations Detachment and the 72nd Mechanized Brigade ambushed the 6th Tank Regiment and 239th Tank Regiments of the 90th Guards Tank Division in Brovary, inflicting heavy losses, including killing the 6th Tank Regiment's commander, Colonel Andrei Zakharo, forcing them to retreat.

==== Fighting at Bucha and Irpin ====
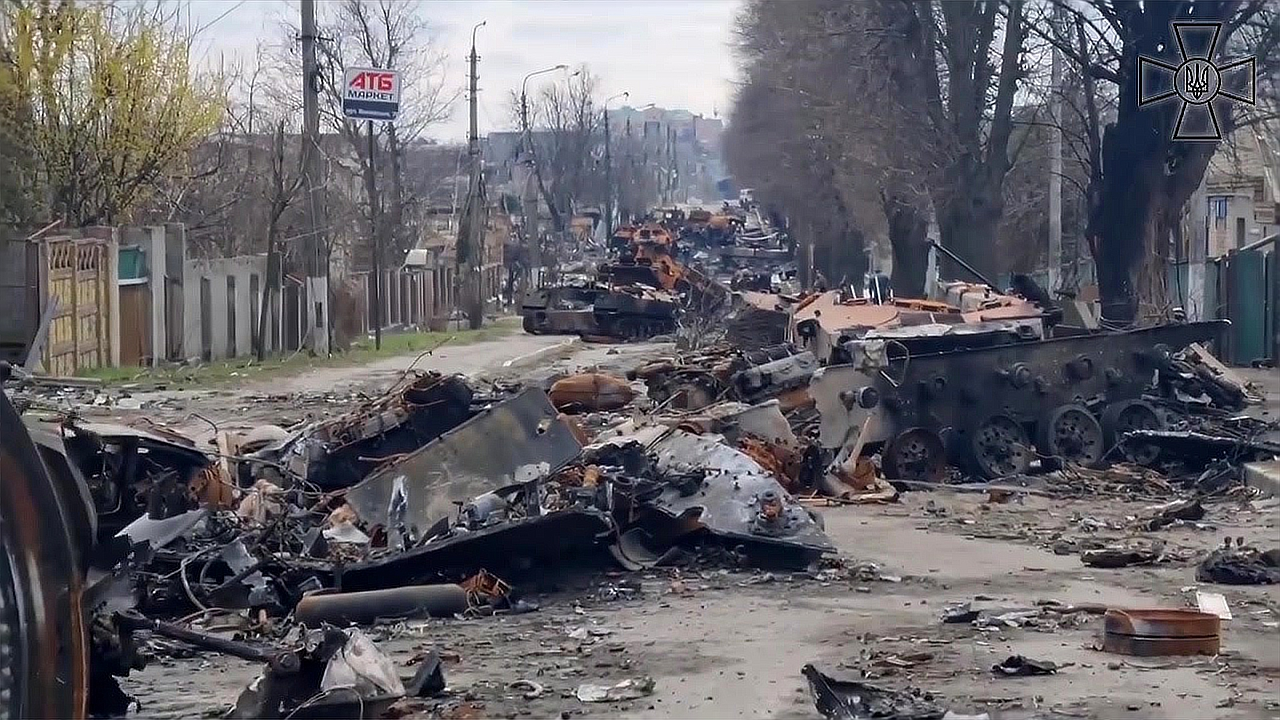
A destroyed Russian convoy in Bucha

On 25 February, due a lack of communications with the main invasion command, a convoy of special police units OMON and SOBR from the Kemerovo Oblast accidentally separated from the invasion forces and ended up charging and spearheading the attack at Kyiv by themselves. The convoy was spotted by local transit CCTV cameras and were ambushed by local Ukrainian forces using anti-tank missiles and mortars at a bridge over the Irpin River, and the unarmored and under-equipped units were completely destroyed. Reportedly, of the 80 soldiers in the convoy, only 3 survived.

Fighting neared Bucha on 27 February, as the 36th Combined Arms Army and Russian special police forces approached the city. Russian artillery began bombarding the city at the same time, causing several civilian casualties, reportedly also wounding the mayor of Bucha, Anatoliy Fedoruk. As fighting developed, Russian breakthroughs allowed units to advance to Irpin.

Ukrainian forces used artillery to shell Russian convoys to halt the advance, and destroyed a bridge linking Bucha and Irpin. According to the mayor of Irpin, Oleksandr Markushin, Russian forces were trapped and destroyed. Ukrainian forces engaged and destroyed an armored column on 28 February.

Irpin was struck by missiles on 2 March. Russian forces attacked a Ukrainian checkpoint in Yasnohorodka on 6 March. Markushin had refused requests by Russian forces to surrender the town.

==== Encirclement of Chernihiv ====
At 06:00 on 24 February, the Russian military crossed the Ukrainian border into the Chernihiv Oblast from both Russia and Belarus, at Hremiach, Mykolaivka, Senkivka, Derevyny and Ilmivka.

At the onset of the Russian invasion, Major General Viktor Nikoliuk, head of the Ukrainian Operational Command North, ordered the 1st Tank Brigade to defend Chernihiv, and sent the 58th Motorized Brigade to Baturyn and Hlukhiv in order to stop the Russian advance on the major highway there. The 1st Brigade failed to reach a planned defensive line at Ripky and Horodnia on time, though it still managed to stall the Russian advance north of Chernihiv and began to fortify the city. Meanwhile, the 58th Brigade was outnumbered and forced to retreat, first to Konotop and then to Vertiivka and Kipti, where it took up the defense of the area south of Chernihiv.

Near Chernihiv, Russian forces struck Pivka airfield. The Ukrainian military said its forces had stopped Russian columns near Baturyn and on the outskirts of Chernihiv, near the villages of Velyki Osniaky and Rivnopillia.

By the second day, Russian forces were present in or near Snovsk, Sosnytsia, Mena, Semenivka, Horodnia, Koriukivka and Novhorod-Siverskyi.

On 1 March, the governor of Chernihiv Oblast, Vyacheslav Chaus, stated that every access point to the city of Chernihiv was heavily mined, urging civilians to exercise caution.

On 10 March, Chernihiv Mayor Vladyslav Atroshenko said that Russian forces had completed the encirclement of Chernihiv, adding that the city was completely isolated and critical infrastructure for its 300,000 residents was rapidly failing as it came under repeated bombardment.

==== Operations in other northern regions ====
A column of Russian military vehicles crossed the international border at the Bachivsk checkpoint in the Sumy Oblast around 5:00 on 24 February. Units of Ukraine's 58th Motorized Brigade engaged the Russians outside the city of Hlukhiv, halting the column. The Ukrainian military claimed to have neutralized the column outside of Hlukhiv using Javelin anti-tank missiles, but by 14:30 on 24 February, the governor of the Sumy Oblast acknowledged that Russian forces were in control of the entire length of the Kyiv–Moscow highway in the Sumy Oblast, up until Baturyn in the Chernihiv Oblast. Due to the destruction of the bridge over the Seim River outside of Baturyn by Ukrainian forces, Russian forces were forced to use alternative routes to Kyiv, taking a detour through Konotop, Bakhmach, and Plysky.

A separate Russian advance into Sumy Oblast on 24 February attacked the city of Sumy, just 35 kilometres (22 mi) from the Russo-Ukrainian border. The Russian advance bogged down in urban fighting, and Ukrainian forces successfully held the city. According to Ukrainian sources, more than 100 Russian tanks, 20 Grad MLRs and eight tanker trucks were destroyed and dozens of soldiers were captured.

Russian forces entered Sumy Oblast from Russia on the morning of 24 February. Two Russian tank columns crossing the border at Grayvoron and Popivka reached Velyka Pysarivka at 08:00. Clashes broke out in Okhtyrka between 12:00-14:00 as a Russian column attempted to pass through the city. Russian forces attacked Okhtyrka by 14:25, deploying thermobaric weapons; Russian assaults on the city were repelled by territorial defense fighters and Ukraine's 93rd Mechanized Brigade. On the evening of February 24, two convoys of Russian soldiers coming from the cities of Nedryhailiv and Konotop made their way in the direction of Romny.

Russia's 4th Guards Tank Division first entered the city of Trostianets in Sumy Oblast shortly after noon on 24 February. There were no Ukrainian military units in the city, and due to a lack of weapons, the local territorial defense unit had elected to disperse and engage in partisan combat. Russian tank columns moved westward through the city on their way towards Kyiv.

In the early hours of 2 March, the Sumy administration claimed that about 100 Russian military vehicles, mainly tanks and armored personnel carriers (APCs), had been destroyed in the village of Byshkin.

Russian forces moved west along highways from Sumy, reaching Brovary, an eastern suburb of Kyiv, on 4 March. In an assessment of the campaign on 4 March, Frederick Kagan wrote that the "Sumy axis is currently the most successful and dangerous Russian avenue of advance on Kyiv." He noted that the geography favored mechanized advances as the terrain "is flat and sparsely populated, offering few good defensive positions." According to the Institute for the Study of War, since Russian forces failed to secure any new territory in the theater after 8 March, it was possible that they had redeployed forces from eastern Kyiv to defend against Ukrainian counterattacks in Sumy Oblast.

Throughout the battle at Kyiv Oblast, the Zhytomyr Oblast was also affected. Russian forces operating nearby Kyiv had advanced some 20 miles (32 km) into the oblast towards Bihun and Ovruch as of 3 March. The General Staff of the Ukrainian Armed Forces claimed that two Russian BTGs were within the territory of Zhytomyr Oblast.

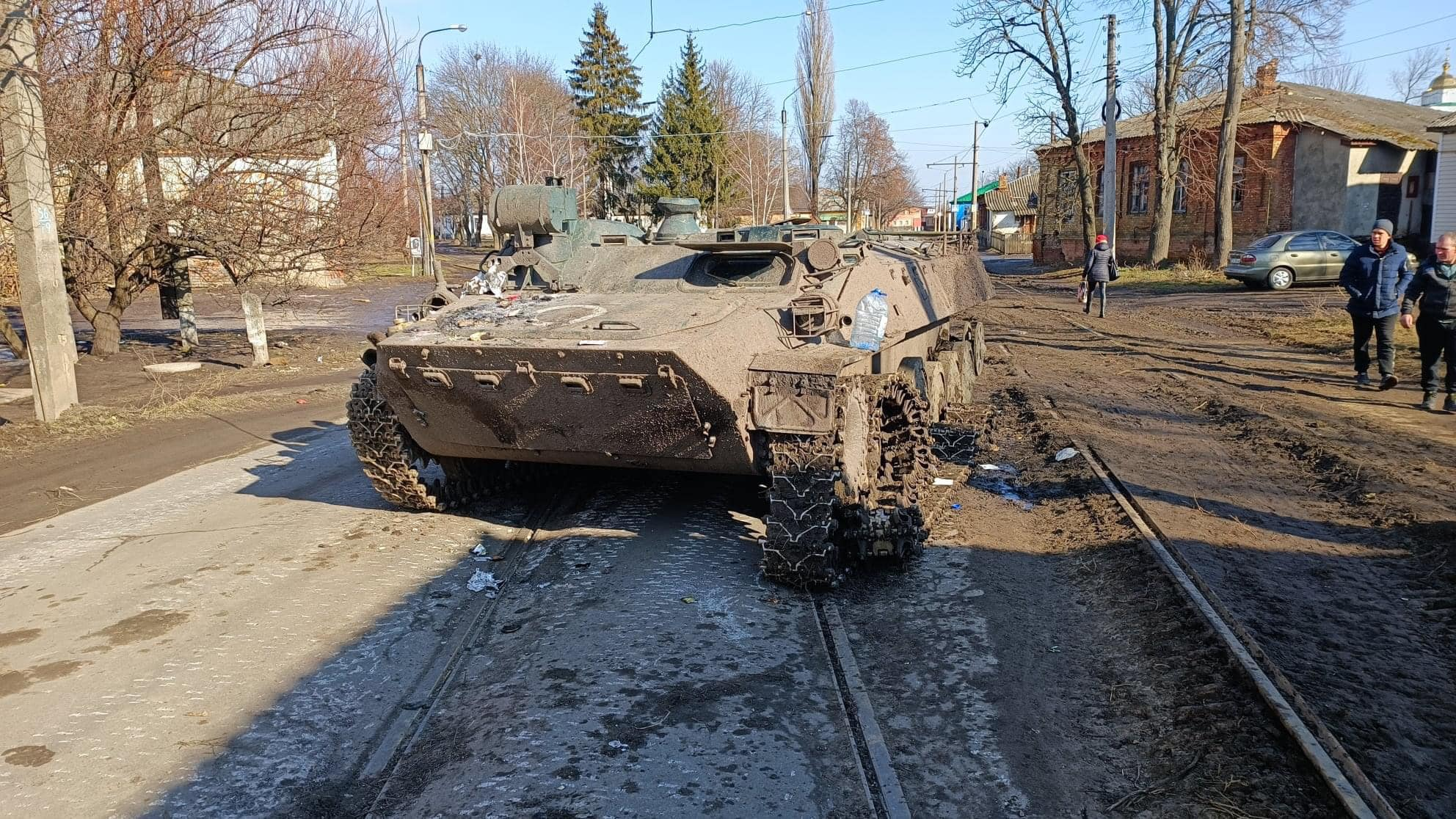
A Russian 9K114 Shturm destroyed in Konotop, 24–25 February

Ukrainian forces repelled an attack by a column of up to 300 Russian vehicles on Konotop late on 24 February, and Russian forces reportedly retreated from the city of Sumy in the early hours of the next day. However, the Russian military claimed later on 25 February that it had encircled both cities. Outside of Konotop, Ukraine's military said that Russian troops were experiencing "problems with fuel and supply" and had suffered heavy losses, though later statements from Ukrainian officials suggested that Ukrainian forces lost control over the city later that day.

On 25 February, battles began in the outskirts of Okhtyrka around 7:30 from the direction of the village of Velyka Pysarivka. Russian forces were unable to occupy Okhtyrka, and retreated the following day, leaving behind tanks and equipment.

On 26 February, clashes occurred in Sumy between Russian forces and Territorial Defense Forces throughout the day. Russian forces reportedly managed to capture half of the city during the day, but Ukrainian forces repelled the attackers according to a Ukrainian official. Three civilians were reportedly killed in shelling on Sumy. Dmytro Zhyvytskyi, the governor of Sumy Oblast, stated that six civilians were killed and 55 wounded in Russian shelling on Okhtyrka. Russian forces west of Sumy reportedly advanced further westwards by the night, and were apparently 150 kilometres (93 mi) from Kyiv. BM-27 Uragan missiles hit a school in Okhtyrka, killing a guard and injuring an unknown number of children and a teacher. However, Ukrainian forces put up heavy resistance, forcing the Russians to retreat.

Between February 26 and 27, more Russian vehicles headed towards Romny from Krasnopillia, bypassing Sumy. A second convoy was bombed by Ukrainian forces before it reached Romny. Ukrainian forces allegedly destroyed some Russian tanks outside of Trostianets on 27 February.

Also on 27 February, a number of Russian vehicles advanced into Sumy from the east, while two women were reportedly killed around the Sumy Airport. On 28 February, Russian forces bombed and destroyed an oil depot in Okhtyrka. More than 70 Ukrainian soldiers were killed when their base in Okhtyrka was struck by a thermobaric bomb. Russian forces also attacked the Romny Correctional Colony. Meanwhile, that same day, Russian forces crushed a civilian in the village of Pohozha Krynytsia when he attempted to use his car to block Russian tanks passing through. On the same day, a local man died in Shtepivka attempting to enter an abandoned military vehicle that had been mined. The next day, the Ukrainians claimed to have destroyed 80 units of Russian equipment near the village of Pustoviitivka, half of which were Grad MLRS.

In the Sumy Oblast, the Russian offensive began to stall due to Ukrainian resistance west and southwest of Trostianets, and the detonation of a bridge south of the city. As a result, Trostianets, which was first envisioned as "little more than a speed bump" in Russian plans to swiftly take Kyiv, was occupied by a garrison of Russian troops on 1 March.

On the same day, the Sumy Oblast territorial defense was reported to have erected roadblocks and checkpoints on some parts of the Kipti-Bachivsk highway, a major road which had been one of the main routes of the Russian invasion. Meanwhile, Russian forces captured the villages of Bilovodske and Bobryk, just south of Romny, which had been contested in previous days.

On 2 March, Russian forces gave Konotop's mayor an ultimatum to surrender the city, threatening to bombard it with artillery; an "angry crowd" of locals "overwhelmingly" refused to surrender. A compromise was reached under which Russian forces agreed not to interfere with the city's government or deploy troops in return for the residents not attacking them. The territorial council of the Kruty rural hromada in Chernihiv Oblast claimed that nearly 200 Russian soldiers were killed in clashes with Ukrainian armed forces and the Territorial Defense Forces in the village of Kruty on 2 March. On the same day, it was reported that the Ukrainian military and border guards of the 5th Detachment had returned the border with Russia in some areas of Sumy Oblast.

On 3 March, five people were reportedly injured from shelling on buildings of the 27th Artillery Brigade and the military department at Sumy State University. Elsewhere in the Sumy Oblast, an escalation in Russian artillery shelling led to the bombardment of the localities of Nedryhailiv, Okhtyrka, Boromlia, Bezdryk and Lebedyn. The same day, Ukraine's 93rd Mechanized Brigade announced that Ukrainian artillery had destroyed a Russian column near the village of Moskovskyi Bobryk. During their stay in the village, the Russians had looted the local shops and burnt the car of the head of the village, according to residents.

On 3 March, Russian troops shelled Lebedyn during the bombardment across Sumy Oblast.

The next day, civilians from the village of Spartak attempted to block Russian vehicles passing from Nedryhailiv to Romny. They succeeded in blocking the road, although an ensuing attack by the Russians resulted in one civilian dying. During the night between March 4 and 5, Russian soldiers occupied a poultry farm in Vilshana, Sumy Oblast, killing around 100,000 poultry and causing an estimated one million hryvnias worth of damage.

On March 5, three out of four hostages who were taken by Russian troops were released, according to the head of the Romny Raion, Denys Vashchenko. That same day, Russian soldiers standing on the road fired at Ukrainian TDF troops at a gas station, leaving one Ukrainian soldier killed and two wounded. On the evening of March 5, Russian soldiers fired at two cars traveling from Sumy to Romny, in the village of Pustoviitivka. 3 civilians were wounded, and one civilian was killed in the shooting. Later that evening, in the village of Skrypali in Romny Raion, Ukrainian forces destroyed a Russian column, and killed an unspecified number of soldiers. In the evening between March 5 and 6, shots were fired in Pustoviitivka and Romny, with no injuries. The shooting in Romny, however, knocked out electricity for parts of the town.

Lebedyn was completely cut off from electricity for the 4 and 5 of March. On 5 March at 7 a.m., civilians heard an air raid alarm in Lebedyn as the Russians began shelling the city. The explosions blew out windows in multistoried buildings. The artillery shelling went on all day long. An electric substation, the Lebedyn bakery, and a gas station were destroyed by Russian shelling.

According to the Military Administration, Russian artillery shelling and the airstrikes of 6 March left many inhabitants of Lebedyn without electricity. The prosecution launched a pre-trial investigation into the destruction of the Lebedyn bakery by the strikes of Russian military planes.

On 7 March, the electricity supply to Lebedyn was partially restored.

On the night of 8 to 9 March, the Russian air forces attacked Lebedyn. Two houses in Shevchenka Street were ruined. Five people, two children among them, were retrieved from the debris. The officers of the 5th State Fire and Rescue Brigade, who were in charge that night, worked at the site from 01:45 on 9 March.

On 11 March, Sumy Oblast Governor Dmytro Zhyvytskyy claimed that 104 Russian servicemen had been taken prisoner in Sumy Oblast since the invasion began.

According to Yuriy Bova, the mayor of Trostianets, Russian forces were planning to capture Lebedyn on 12 March, Okhtyrka on 13 March, and Sumy on 14 March, but were prevented from doing so by Ukrainian resistance. Members of the 2nd Guards Motor Rifle Division were reportedly told on 11 March that they would storm the city of Sumy, but after a company in the division rebelled two days later, all conscripts serving in its ranks were sent back into Russia. The Ukrainian General Staff claimed on 19 March that units of Russia's 1st Guards Tank Army were focused on surrounding Sumy, while preparing offensive operations in the areas of Trostianets, Okhtyrka, and Poltava. Some of the units were claimed to be planning offensives the direction of Pryluky and Kyiv.

On the night of 11 March, the Russian troops shelled houses in Kerdylivshchyna killing two locals – Vasyl Masliuk and Valeriy Sukhanov.

As of 13 March, 22,500 civilians in Sumy Oblast had no electricity. According to the Military Administration, shelling damaged the power lines in Okhtyrka, Trostianets, Lebedyn and Sumy. On March 11, Vashchenko reported that Ukrainian forces unblocked the road between Romny and Lokhvytsia, allowing civilians to flee southwards. That morning near Romny, police and Ukrainian TDF discovered and detained 29 Russian soldiers in a field, all of whom claimed to be lost. Between 11 and 12 March, the Ukrainians claimed to have destroyed a column of 80 military vehicles belonging to the 228th Motorized Rifle Regiment of the 90th Tank Division in the Chernihiv Oblast.

=== Stalemate (11–15 March) ===
Russian soldiers showcase captured Ukrainian Javelin ATGMs in the village of Huta-Mezhyhirska, March 2022

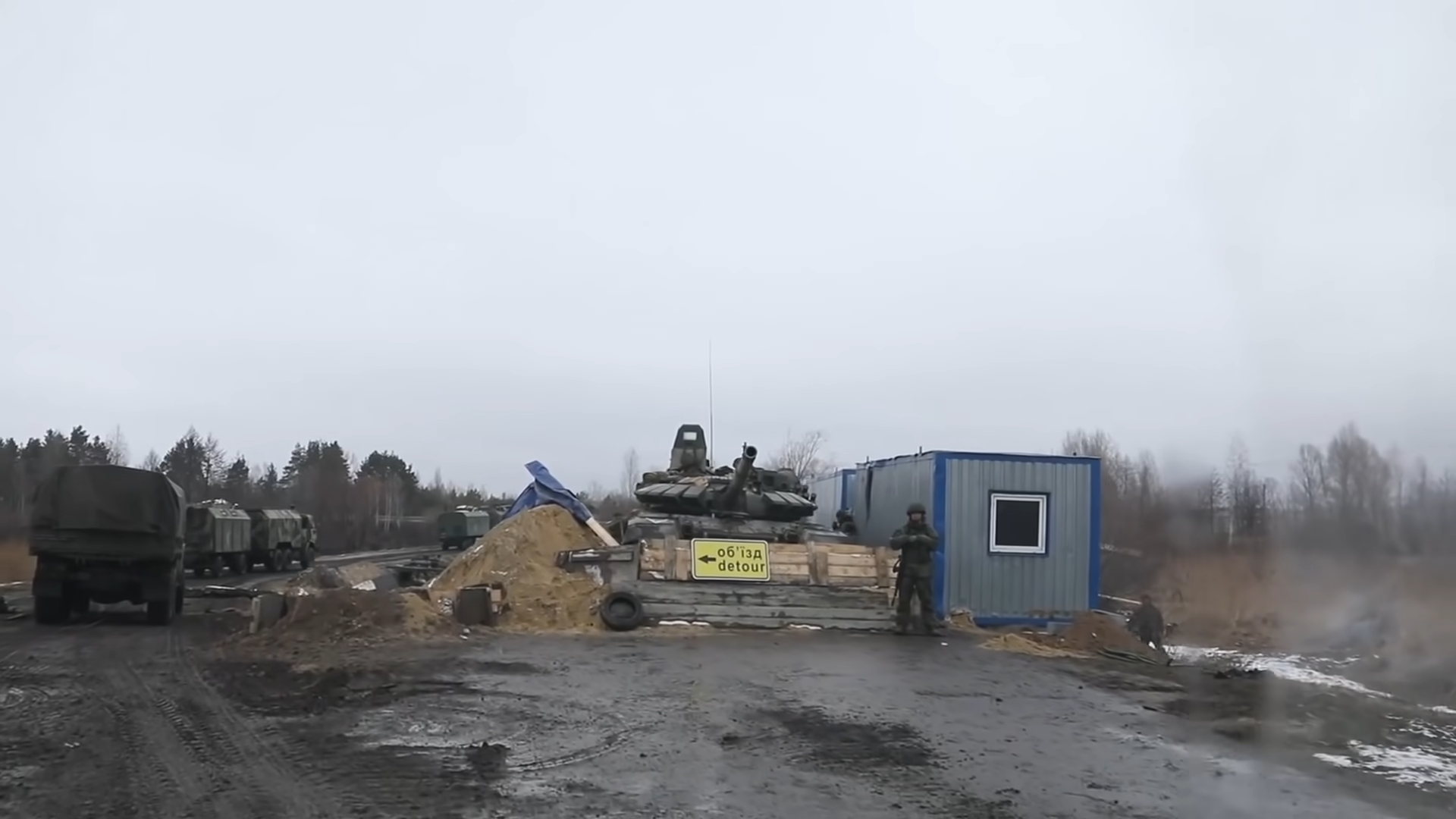
A Russian checkpoint in Kyiv Oblast, March 2022

By early March, Russian advances along the west side of the Dnieper were limited, after setbacks from Ukrainian defences. As of 5 March, a large Russian convoy, reportedly 64 kilometres (40 mi) in length, had made little progress toward Kyiv. The London-based think tank Royal United Services Institute (RUSI) assessed Russian advances from the north and east as "stalled". Advances along the Chernihiv axis had largely halted as a siege there began. By 11 March, it was reported that the lengthy convoy had largely dispersed, taking up positions under tree cover. Rocket launchers were also identified.

Russian forces continued to advance on Kyiv from the northwest, capturing Bucha, Hostomel, and Vorzel by 5 March, though Irpin remained contested as of 9 March.

By 11 March, some elements of the Russian Kyiv convoy broke off and deployed into firing positions. While the bulk of the convoy remained on the road, some parts, including artillery, left the main column, and took up positions near Hostomel. Some elements of the convoy took up positions in Lubianka and nearby forests. An assessment of the offensive at this date by the Institute for the Study of War said that Russian ground forces attempting to encircle Kyiv had paused to resupply and refit their combat units, having failed in their attacks from 8 to 10 March.

In the Chernihiv Oblast, Ukrainian forces claimed to have retaken the village of Baklanova Muraviika on 10 March. The next day the Ukrainian military announced that it had recaptured five settlements in the Chernihiv Oblast, in addition to seizing two armored personnel carriers. On 12 March, the Institute for the Study of War stated that it was likely that counterattacks by the Territorial Defense Forces of Ukraine threatened Russia's long line of communication in this theater. On the same day, Ukrainian forces reportedly recaptured two more settlements in the Chernihiv Oblast and prevented more Russian forces from advancing towards Kyiv.

On 12 March, the Security Service of Ukraine said that seven civilians were killed after Russian forces shot at an evacuation column in the village of Peremoha, Brovary Raion, and forced it to turn back.

An overnight barrage of missile attacks had destroyed the Vasylkiv Air Base along with its airstrip. In addition, the ammunition depot and an oil depot in the town and an oil depot in the village of Kriachky were set ablaze as well. Shelling on the village of Kvitneve at 03:40 set a frozen goods warehouse on fire. Russian Defense Ministry spokesman Igor Konashenkov stated that long-range high-precision missiles were used to destroy the military airfield in Vasylkiv and the "main center of radio and electronic intelligence of Ukrainian forces" in Brovary.

On 13 March, the UK's Ministry of Defence reported that Russian forces were 25 kilometres (16 mi) from the center of Kyiv.

That day American journalist Brent Renaud was killed and two other journalists were wounded at a checkpoint in Irpin when Russian forces reportedly shot at a car carrying non-Ukrainian journalists. Ukrainian forces prevented an attempt by Russian forces to advance further on Kyiv by blowing up a pontoon bridge on the Irpin river near Hostomel and 5 kilometres (3.1 mi) north of the main bridge on the river. Russian advances across the Irpin were also hindered by flooding caused by their own attack on the Kozarovychi dam, which regulates flow from the Kyiv Reservoir.

On 14 March, Fox News reporter Benjamin Hall was wounded in the village of Horenka while reporting on the conflict near Kyiv. Cameraman Pierre Zakrzewski and Oleksandra Kuvshynova, a Ukrainian news producer and fixer, were killed in the same attack. Anton Herashchenko, an adviser to the Ukrainian Minister of Internal Affairs, stated that the deaths were caused by Russian shelling. Russian forces meanwhile had captured Bucha and half of Irpin by 14 March.

On 15 March, a new military headquarters responsible for the defense of Kyiv was established. Zelenskyy appointed acting Commander of the Joint Forces Oleksandr Pavliuk as head of the "Kyiv Regional Military Administration" and Eduard Koskalov the new Commander of the Joint Forces. The National Police of Ukraine stated that one civilian was killed and two others wounded in Hostomel when Russian troops fired at evacuation buses. In Bucha, Russian troops captured volunteers and employees of the city council, although they released them the next day.

=== Ukrainian counteroffensive (16 March – 4 April) ===
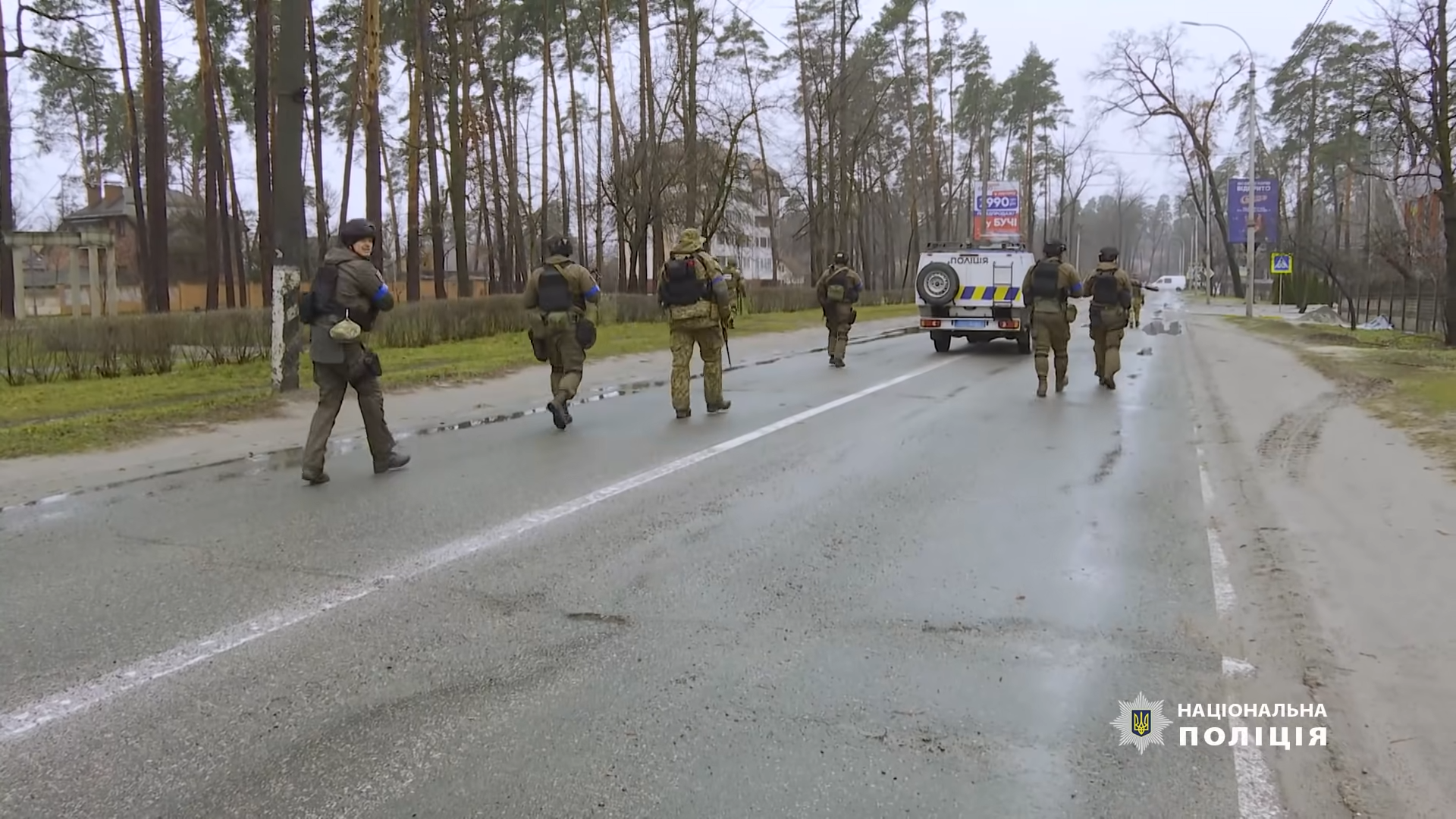
Ukrainian police entering Bucha on 2 April

On 16 March, the Ukrainian government announced that its forces had begun a counter-offensive to repel Russian forces approaching Kyiv. Fighting took place in Bucha, Hostomel, and Irpin. Russian forces conducted only limited attacks northwest of Kyiv.

On 17 March, Ukraine's Defense Ministry announced that Russian forces had made "no significant advances around Kyiv in the past 24–48 hours" and had resorted to "chaotic" shelling. A British military intelligence report added that Russian forces suffered "heavy losses" while making "minimal progress".

On 18 March, Ukraine blocked Russia's two main routes for attacking the capital city as the latter was abandoning "offensive actions" around Brovary and Boryspil. Ukraine worked on strengthening a third line of defense around the capital, while Russian forces were "cynically shooting" at infrastructure facilities.

By 19 March, Russia was attempting to consolidate control over the area they occupied, while more efforts were made to resupply and reinforce units' static positions. Maxar imagery showed Russian forces digging trenches and revetments in Kyiv Oblast.

On 20 March, Russian missiles struck a number of areas in the capital and what Russia described as a "Ukrainian special forces training center" in Zhytomyr Oblast.

On 21 March, Ukraine halted a Russian attack on Brovary, while Russia claimed to have captured a Ukrainian command bunker in Mykolaivka. However, Russian forces were still reportedly struggling to organize the sufficient logistical support needed for major operations in the northwest of Kyiv.

Unable to achieve a quick victory in Kyiv, Russian forces switched strategies and began using standoff weapons, indiscriminate bombing, and siege warfare.

Between 22 and 24 March, Ukrainian forces retook the strategically important town of Makariv (22 March), the village of Moshchun (23 March), and the small settlement of Lukianivka (24 March). It was claimed that three Russian tanks and nine infantry fighting vehicles were destroyed at Lukianivka, as well as some armor captured, while Ukrainian troops were reportedly working on the encirclement of Russian units in nearby villages. Irpin was reportedly 80% controlled by Ukrainian forces, while Russia launched rocket attacks against the town.

On 23 March, reports arose that Russian soldiers were starting to mutiny against their leaders. Colonel Yuri Medvedev was fighting in Makariv when a soldier from the 37th Guards Motor Rifle Brigade was reported to have deliberately rammed into the colonel, breaking both his legs, allegedly killing him. This was because the 37th Brigade, which he was commanding, was reported to have lost close to 50% of its men while fighting in Makariv. Dan Sabbagh wrote in The Guardian that while the attack most likely occurred, little evidence existed confirming that Medvedev had indeed died.

On 24 March, the International Atomic Energy Agency (IAEA) said that Russian shelling on Slavutych prevented personnel from rotating to and from the Chernobyl nuclear plant.

By 25 March, Ukrainian counterattacks in Kyiv Oblast had retaken several towns to the east and west of Kyiv, including Makariv. Under attack by the Ukrainian military, Russian troops in the Bucha area began to retreat north at the end of March. Ukrainian forces entered the city on 1 April. A British Ministry of Defence intelligence assessment reported that, as Russian forces were falling back on overextended supply lines, Ukraine recaptured towns and defensive positions up to 35 kilometers (25 miles) east of Kyiv. The assessment concluded that Ukrainian forces were likely "to continue to attempt to push Russian Forces back along the north-western axis from Kyiv towards Hostomel Airfield." The Russian military also withdrew from the village of Malyi Vystorop in Sumy Oblast on the same day.

On 26 March, additional Russian forces from the Eastern Military District (EMD) were reportedly being sent into the Kyiv–Chernihiv axis. The ISW assessed that Ukraine created a "Russian salient" at Hostomel that is "exposed from several directions and apparently under continued pressure". The Ukrainian military said that its forces had retaken the villages of Lukianivka and Rudnytske, 40 kilometers east of Brovary, on 26 March, forcing Russia's 30th Separate Motor Rifle Brigade to retreat.

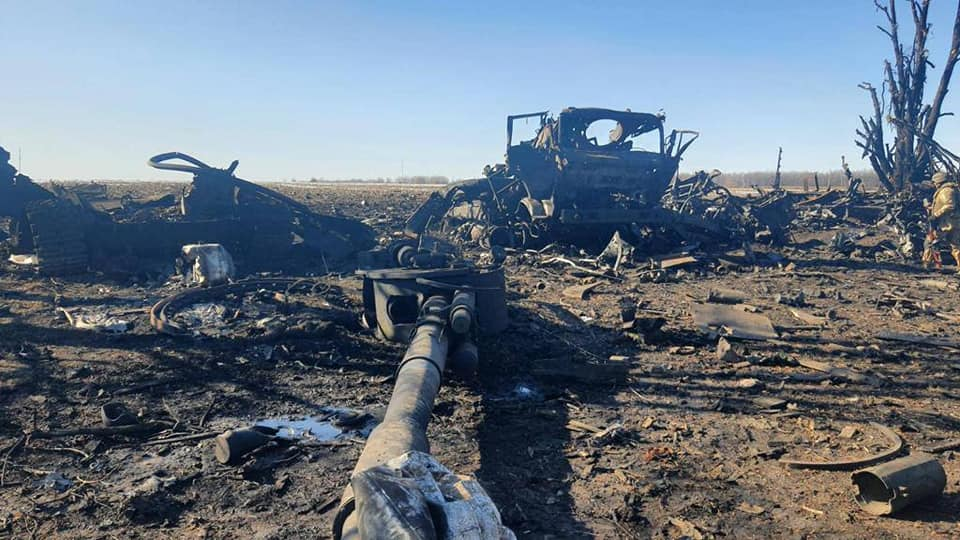
Wreckage from a Russian column destroyed near Trostianets on 17 March

Following several days of Ukrainian artillery shelling and drone strikes, Trostianets was abandoned by Russian troops over the night of 25–26 March, and Ukraine's 93rd Mechanized Brigade retook the city on the 26th. Associated Press reporters in the city said it was "not clear" where the Russian forces had gone. The recapture of the city was expected to open up supply routes to relieve the besieged city of Sumy, and "seriously restrict" the Russian military's ability to maneuver in the region. On the same day, Ukrainian forces also took the neighboring city of Boromlia, and Russian troops withdrew from the villages of Velykyi Bobryk and Steblianka, which are also in the Sumy Oblast. Russian forces destroyed a bridge over the Psel River after withdrawing from villages near the city of Sumy. On 27 March, Slavhorod and Krasnopillia were retaken.

On 27 March, Russia's 35th Combined Arms Army reportedly rotated damaged units into Belarus under cover of airstrikes and shelling, while it was claimed that Russia established a command post for all EMD-forces operating around Kyiv in the Chernobyl area. The ISW assessed that the EMD Commander Colonel-General Aleksandr Chaiko "may be personally commanding efforts to regroup Russian forces in Belarus and resume operations to encircle Kyiv from the west".

On 28 March, Ukrainian forces reportedly retook Irpin, with the city's mayor saying the city would be a staging ground for the recapture of Bucha, Hostomel, and Vorzel.

On 29 March, the Russian Deputy Ministry of Defence Alexander Fomin announced a withdrawal of Russian forces from the Kyiv and Chernihiv areas. Ukrainian forces stormed the village of Dmytrivka, about 35 km west of Kyiv, on 29 March. Between 30 and 31 March, Ukrainian forces reportedly recaptured the settlements of Dmytrivka, Kopyliv, Kapitanivka, Lisne, Buzova, all near Kyiv. Near Brovary, Ploske, Svitylnia, and Hrebelky were reportedly recaptured on 30 March, with Ukrainian forces reportedly entering Nova Basan on 31 March.

Between 30 and 31 March, Russian forces shelled the eastern and northern suburbs of Kyiv where Ukrainian forces had regained territory in recent days, as well as Irpin and Makariv. At the same time, there were battles reported around Hostomel amidst Ukrainian counterattacks and some Russian withdrawals around Brovary. According to the British Ministry of Defence, "Russian forces continue to hold positions to the east and west of Kyiv despite the withdrawal of a limited number of units" and projected that heavy fighting would likely take place in the suburbs of the city in coming days.

After several weeks of attacks, and a month under siege, Ukrainian forces managed to break the encirclement of Chernihiv on 31 March by recapturing a main road connecting Kyiv with the regional capital.

Bucha was retaken by Ukrainian forces on 31 March, according to its mayor Anatolii Fedoruk. Ukrainian troops recaptured Hostomel and Borodianka by 1 April, and some Russian units withdrew from Chernihiv Oblast. Ivankiv was also captured by 1 April, as Ukrainian forces advanced from Zhytomyr Oblast, and some reports suggested that they had conducted counterattacks in Dytiatky and Orane. According to a Ukrainian official, reconnaissance indicated that Russian forces had left the Chernobyl area by 1 April. Amid a withdrawal of Russian troops into Belarus, the Ukrainian military announced that its forces had retaken Demydiv, Dymer, Lytvynivka, Havrylivka, Kozarovychi, Zhovtneve, Hlibivka, Yasnohorodka, Tolokun, Sukholuchchia, Lypivka, Havronshchyna, Makovyshche, Mykolaivka and Khmilna.

In Chernihiv Oblast, the Right Sector Ukrainian Volunteer Corps announced that on 31 March, it had taken control of the settlements of Petrivka, Staryi Bykiv, Novyi Bykiv, Havrylivka, Ukrainka, Makiivka, Tereshkivka, Halytsia, Yakhnivka, and Svitanok. The next day, Ukraine's military announced that following a Russian withdrawal from the area, it had retaken control over Rudnia, Shevchenkove and Bobryk of Kyiv Oblast, along with Stara Basan, Nova Basan, Pohreby, Bazhanivka, Volodymyrivka, Shniakivka and Salne, Sofiivka of Chernihiv Oblast.

Subsequent artillery strikes were supposed to cover the start of a Russian retreat from Kyiv Oblast. Russian forces also mined areas as they pulled back. Ukrainian forces responded to the withdrawal by continuing their counter-offensive; as a result, the Russian retreat was disorderly in some areas, and some Russian troops were left behind.

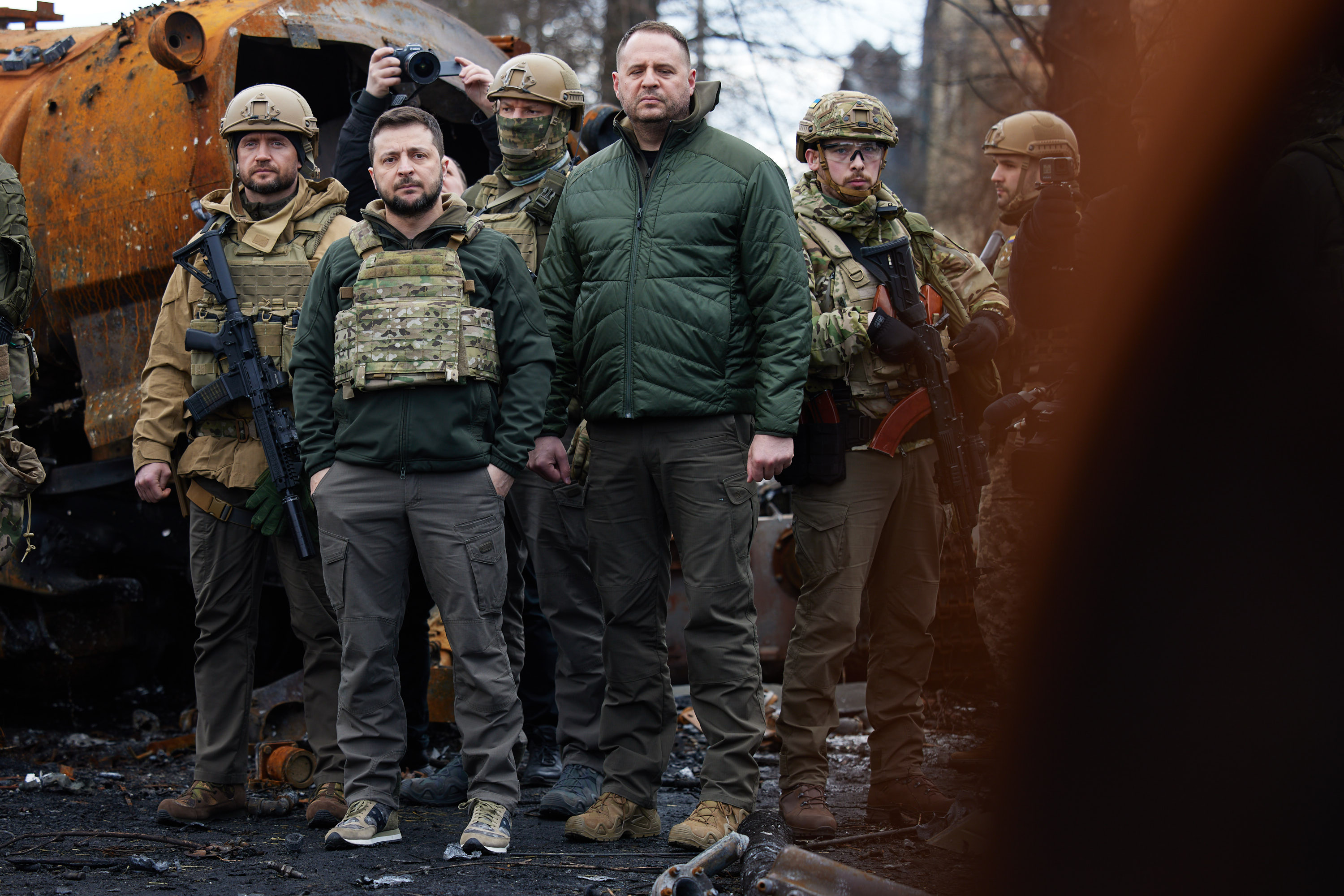
President Volodymyr Zelenskyy in Bucha on 4 April

By 1 April, Russian forces had "almost left" the entire Brovary Raion. Ukrainian forces subsequently engaged in "mopping up" operations, involving the clearing of barricades, ammunition and suspected booby traps. Zelenskyy warned for "a potentially catastrophic situation for civilians" due to mines left by Russian forces around "homes, abandoned equipment and even the bodies of those killed". That day, Ukrainian journalist Maks Levin was found dead near the village of Huta-Mezhyhirska after going missing for more than two weeks. Ukraine's prosecutor's office claimed that the journalist was killed by "two shots" from the Russian military.

On 2 April, Ukrainian forces retook control over all of Kyiv Oblast including Irpin, Bucha, Hostomel, and Brovary. Visual confirmation of Ukrainian forces retaking Pripyat district and the border area with Belarus was released on 3 April. Ukraine said it uncovered evidence of war crimes in Bucha.

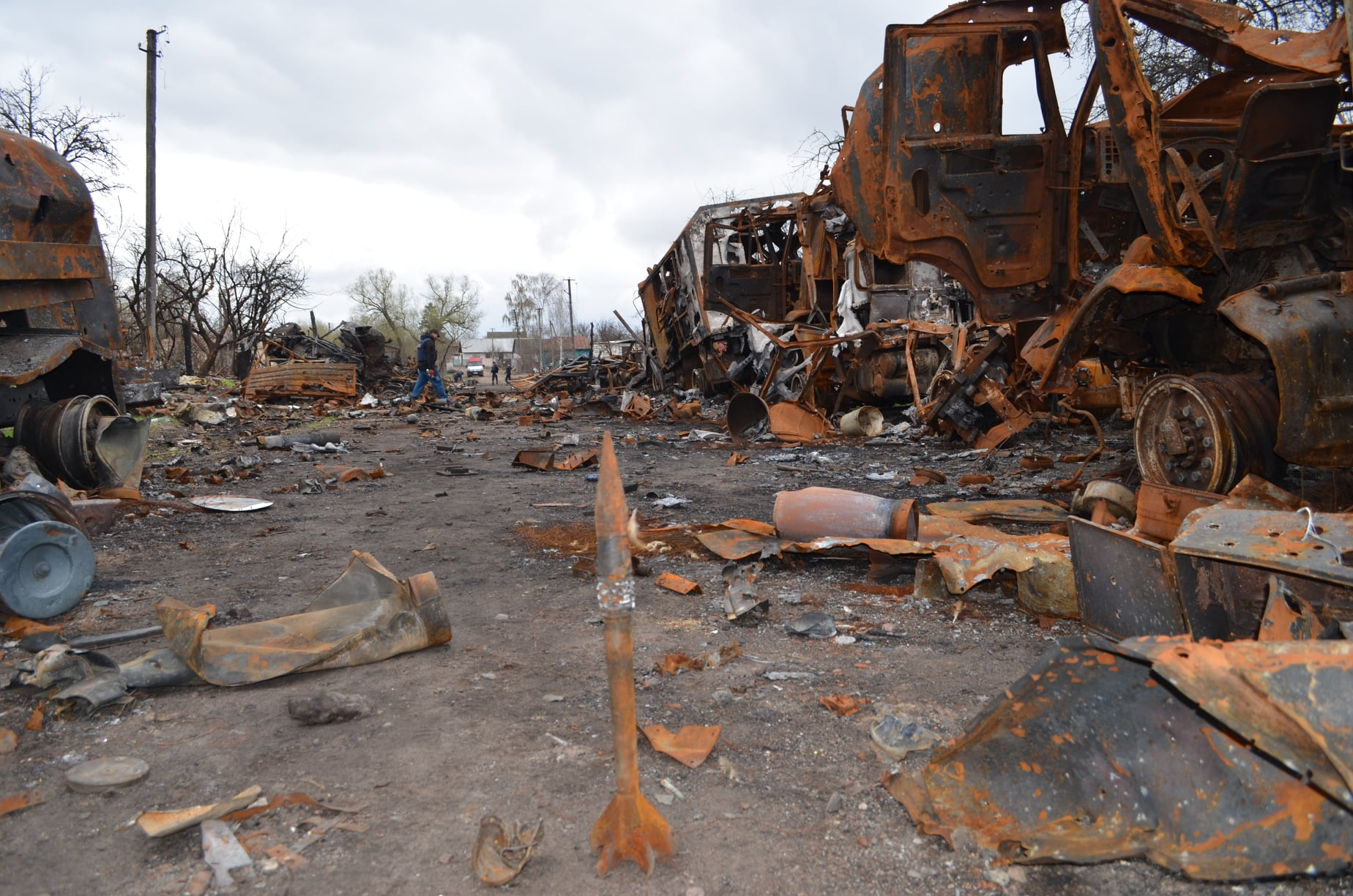
Aftermath of clashes in Shestovytsia village, Chernihiv Oblast, 19 April 2022

Russian forces began to withdraw from Romny Raion on April 1, through a corridor from Kyiv and Chernihiv oblasts through Romny towards the Russian state border. The withdrawal ended on April 4. On the evening of 2 April, amid their withdrawal from the Sumy Oblast, Russian forces destroyed the P44 highway's bridge over the Seim River near the village of Chumakove, after crossing the river in the direction of Russia. The retreating Russian columns withdrew through the villages of Volyntseve and Yurieve towards the international border. In Chernihiv Oblast, Horodnia, Shestovytsia, and Novyi Bykiv were recaptured between 1 and 2 April.

Ukrainian forces recaptured almost the entirety of Chernihiv Oblast and much of Sumy Oblast on 3 April. On 4 April, the Zhytomyr Oblast was declared liberated. Also on 4 April, Governor Dmytro Zhyvytskyi stated that Russian troops no longer occupied any towns or villages in Sumy Oblast and had mostly withdrawn, while Ukrainian troops were working to push out the remaining units. Governor Chaus stated that the Russian military pulled back from the regional capital of Chernihiv, while "some troops" remained in the province. Russian forces reportedly planted mines in many areas where they retreated from. On 6 April, the Pentagon confirmed that the Russian army left Chernihiv Oblast, while Sumy Oblast remained contested. On 8 April, Governor Zhyvytskyi stated that all Russians troops left Sumy Oblast. He added that the territory of the region was still unsafe due to rigged explosives and other ammunition left behind by Russian troops.

== Aftermath ==
After Ukraine had fully retaken Kyiv Oblast, its military began to mop up pockets of isolated Russian troops who had been left behind in the retreat. The Institute for the Study of War assessed that these remnant groups did not offer organized resistance. The Institute for the Study of War also said that some of the Russian units that were pulled back to Belarus and western Russia would "remain combat ineffective for a protracted period".

On 6 April 2022, NATO secretary general Jens Stoltenberg said that the Russian "retraction, resupply, and redeployment" of their troops from the Kyiv area should be interpreted as an expansion of Putin's plans for his military actions against Ukraine, by redeploying and concentrating his forces on Eastern Ukraine and Mariupol within the next two weeks, as a precursor to the further expansion of Putin's actions against the rest of Ukraine.

Ukrainian border guards returned to border regions of Kyiv, Chernihiv, and Sumy oblasts by 11 April. A large concentration of Russian forces remained near Sumy Oblast.

Russian helicopter recovered from the Kyiv Reservoir, May 2022

As the second phase of the invasion began, Kyiv was left generally free from attack apart from isolated missile strikes, one of which occurred during the 28 April 2022 visit of UN Secretary-General António Guterres, who met with Zelenskyy to discuss the fate of survivors at the siege of Mariupol.

On 14 June 2024 Russian president Putin claimed that "Russian troops were near Kyiv in March 2022", but "There was no political decision to storm the three-million-strong city; it was a coercive operation to establish peace."

On 10 June 2025, a Radio Liberty investigation had identified 898 Russian personnel who had been treated in hospitals during the offensive on Kyiv. The group claimed that some of them had been complicit in war crimes committed in the region.

== Humanitarian situation and war crimes ==
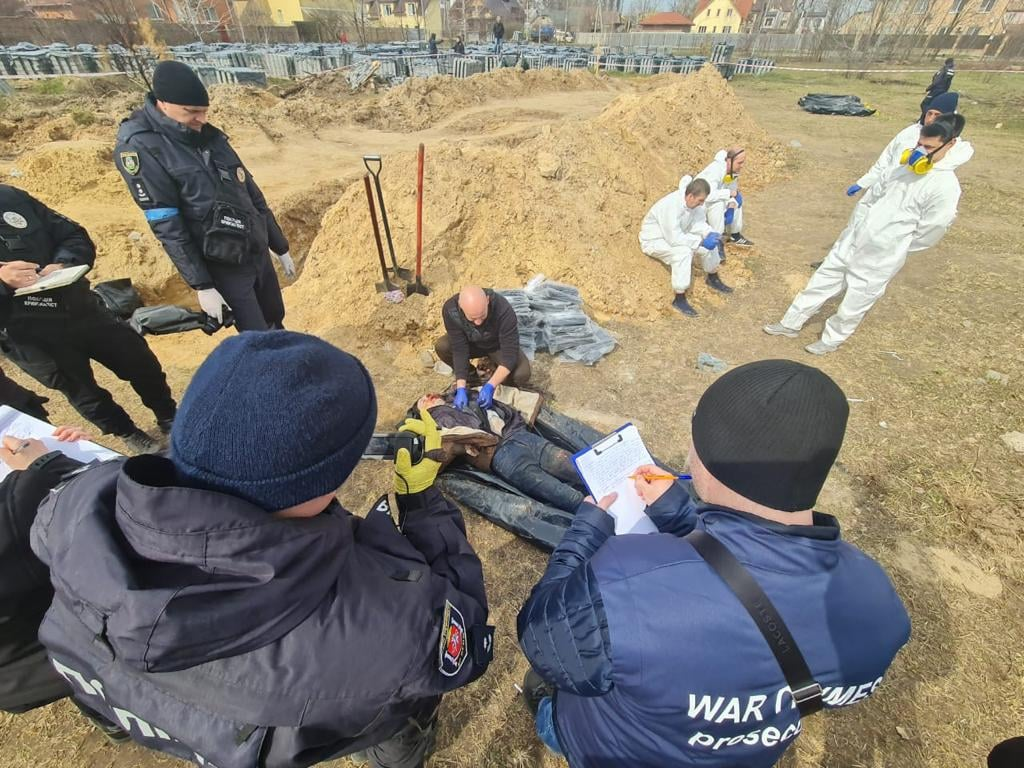
Exhuming a mass grave after the Bucha Massacre

Ukrainian authorities said that more than 300 civilian inhabitants of Bucha had been summarily executed in what would be known as the Bucha massacre. The bodies were discovered after the Russians withdrew. In total, 458 civilian deaths were recorded in Bucha, along with 1,300 deaths in Russian-occupied areas of Kyiv Oblast.

A Russian airstrike on the local power plant on 3 March 2022 cut off the electricity and heating supply in the city of Okhtyrka. On 9 March, in Velyka Pysarivka, three civilians were killed due to Russian bombing according to Zhyvytskyi.

After 01:30 on 10 March, Russian airstrikes destroyed a gas pipeline in Okhtyrka. According to governor Dmytro Zhyvytskyi, Russian shelling on the territory of the former Elektrobutprilad plant in Trostianets had killed three civilians. At 14:20, Russian forces shelled the city of Nizhyn using BM-27 Uragan, reportedly killing two civilians. On 11 March, two civilians were reportedly killed overnight due to Russian shelling in the village of Kerdylivshchyna in Sumy Oblast.

== See also ==
- Russo-Ukrainian war (2022–present)
- Eastern front of the Russo-Ukrainian war
- Southern front of the Russo-Ukrainian war
- Media related to Northern front of the Russian invasion of Ukraine at Wikimedia Commons
- Russian forces approach Ukraine's capital Kyiv at Wikinews
