= Maryna Mirzaieva =

Ukrainian historian

Maryna Serhiivna Mirzaieva
- Марина Сергіївна Мірзаєва
- Born: 2 November 1996 (age 29); Boyarka, Kyiv Oblast, Ukraine
- Military career
- Allegiance: Ukraine
- Branch: Armed Forces of Ukraine
- Service years: 2022–present
- Rank: Junior lieutenant
- Nickname: Mamayka
- Unit: 3rd Assault Brigade (2022–2025) 3rd Army Corps (2025–present)
- Commands: Chief of the Humanitarian Training and Information Support Group of the Psychological Support Department, 3rd Army Corps (since 2025) Chief of the Humanitarian Training and Information Support Group of the Psychological Support Department, 3rd Assault Brigade (2022–2025)
- Conflicts: Russo-Ukrainian War: Russian invasion of Ukraine

Maryna Serhiivna Mirzaieva (Ukrainian: Марина Сергіївна Мірзаєва; born 2 November 1996), call sign Mamayka, is a Ukrainian historian, researcher of the Ukrainian liberation movement, servicewoman of the Armed Forces of Ukraine, and author of the book Women of Freedom. She serves in the 3rd Assault Brigade (3 SAB) as a junior lieutenant, chief of the humanitarian training and information support group of the psychological support department. She is a co-founder of the NGO “Valkyria”, founder of the festival “Under the Protection of the Trident”, and the project “Women of Freedom”.

== Early life and education ==
Maryna Mirzaieva was born on 2 November 1996 in the city of Boyarka, Kyiv Oblast, in a Russified family with deep Ukrainian roots. Her father is an entrepreneur, her mother is a financier. On her mother’s side: great-great-grandfather Pymon Parubchenko was an otaman of Vasylkivshchyna, an associate of Symon Petliura, executed by the Cheka in 1922; the family was dispossessed. From her lineage also comes the dissident and human rights activist Yuriy Lytvyn. On her father’s side: the surname comes from her great-grandfather, a doctor from Baku (Azerbaijan); another great-great-grandfather was a Chechen or Ingush, the family lived in Horlivka (Donbas) until World War II, and then moved to Boyarka near Kyiv.

Her interest in Ukrainian history was influenced by a family friend, Oleksandr Nechyporenko, a participant in the People’s Movement of Ukraine. In high school, according to Maryna, she became interested in the “unpopular for the authorities, distorted history of the 20th century”. In the 11th grade, she read the book Cold Ravine by Yuriy Horlis-Horskyi. After that, she began to communicate exclusively in Ukrainian and profess the ideology of Ukrainian nationalism.

She graduated from the Faculty of History of the Taras Shevchenko National University of Kyiv. She is a postgraduate student at the Institute of Ukrainian Archeography of the National Academy of Sciences of Ukraine (on academic leave since 2022). Her candidate’s thesis is “Women in the Ukrainian Liberation Movement (OUN and UPA)”.

== Career ==
She worked at the National Museum of the History of Ukraine, the All-Ukrainian Youth Center, was the development director of the travel company “Feeriya Mandriv”, and an expert at the Ukrainian Cultural Foundation. She taught history at a private school in Boyarka, worked as a guide. She participated in the Revolution of Dignity. Since 2016, she has been the founder and organizer of the all-Ukrainian historical and musical festival “Under the Protection of the Trident” in Boyarka, dedicated to honoring fighters for independence (Ukrainian People’s Republic, Organization of Ukrainian Nationalists, Ukrainian Insurgent Army). Co-founder of the public organization “Valkyria”, which provides assistance to servicemen.

With the beginning of the full-scale Russian invasion of Ukraine on 24 February 2022, she has been engaged in volunteering. In October 2022, she mobilized to the 3rd Assault Brigade. She serves as the chief of the humanitarian training and information support group of the psychological support department (MPS). She conducts classes with fighters and keeps a diary of events.

== Scientific and literary activity ==
She specializes in the study of the Ukrainian liberation movement of the 20th century, in particular the activities of the Organization of Ukrainian Nationalists (OUN) and the Ukrainian Insurgent Army (UPA). Her research covers the achievements of key units of the UNR (in particular, the Zaporizhian Division and the Sich Riflemen under the command of Petro Bolbochan), the mistakes of Symon Petliura (for example, the execution of Bolbochan due to political intrigue and the delay in declaring war on the Bolsheviks), and the role of women in the struggle for independence (women’s networks of OUN, Ukrainian Red Cross, scouts and liaisons of UPA).

Since 2018, she has been leading the project “Women of Freedom”, dedicated to the role of women in OUN and UPA. In 2025, she published a book of the same name (Vivat publishing house). Co-author of the collections “Forest Boys”, “Country of the Feminine Gender”.

== Views ==
She believes that “wars begin with a conflict of worldviews”, national memory is the basis of resilience. She calls for the formation of a “national myth”, cultivating strength, remembering the Holodomor. She supports the idea of Intermarium.
