= Boiarka urban hromada =

Boiarka urban hromada Боярська міська громада
- Hromada
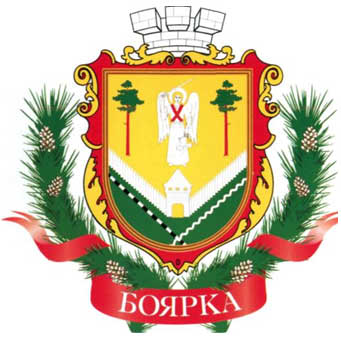
- Seal
- Interactive map of Boiarka urban hromada
- Country: Ukraine
- Oblast: Kyiv Oblast
- Raion: Fastiv Raion

Area
  - Total: 207.8 km^{2} (80.2 sq mi)

Population (2020)
  - Total: 53,620
  - Density: 258.0/km^{2} (668.3/sq mi)
- Settlements: 11
- Cities: 1
- Villages: 10

Boiarka urban hromada (Ukrainian: Боярська міська громада) is a hromada of Ukraine, located in Fastiv Raion, Kyiv Oblast. Its administrative center is the city Boiarka.

It has an area of 207.8 square kilometres (80.2 mi^{2}) and a population of 53,620, as of 2020.

The hromada contains 11 settlements: 1 city (Boiarka), and 10 villages:

- Dzvinkove
- Zhornivka
- Zabiria
- Ivankiv
- Kniazhychi
- Maliutianka
- Nove
- Novosilky
- Pereviz
- Tarasivka

== See also ==
- List of hromadas of Ukraine
