= Tarasivka, Boiarka urban hromada =

Tarasivka Тарасівка
- Village
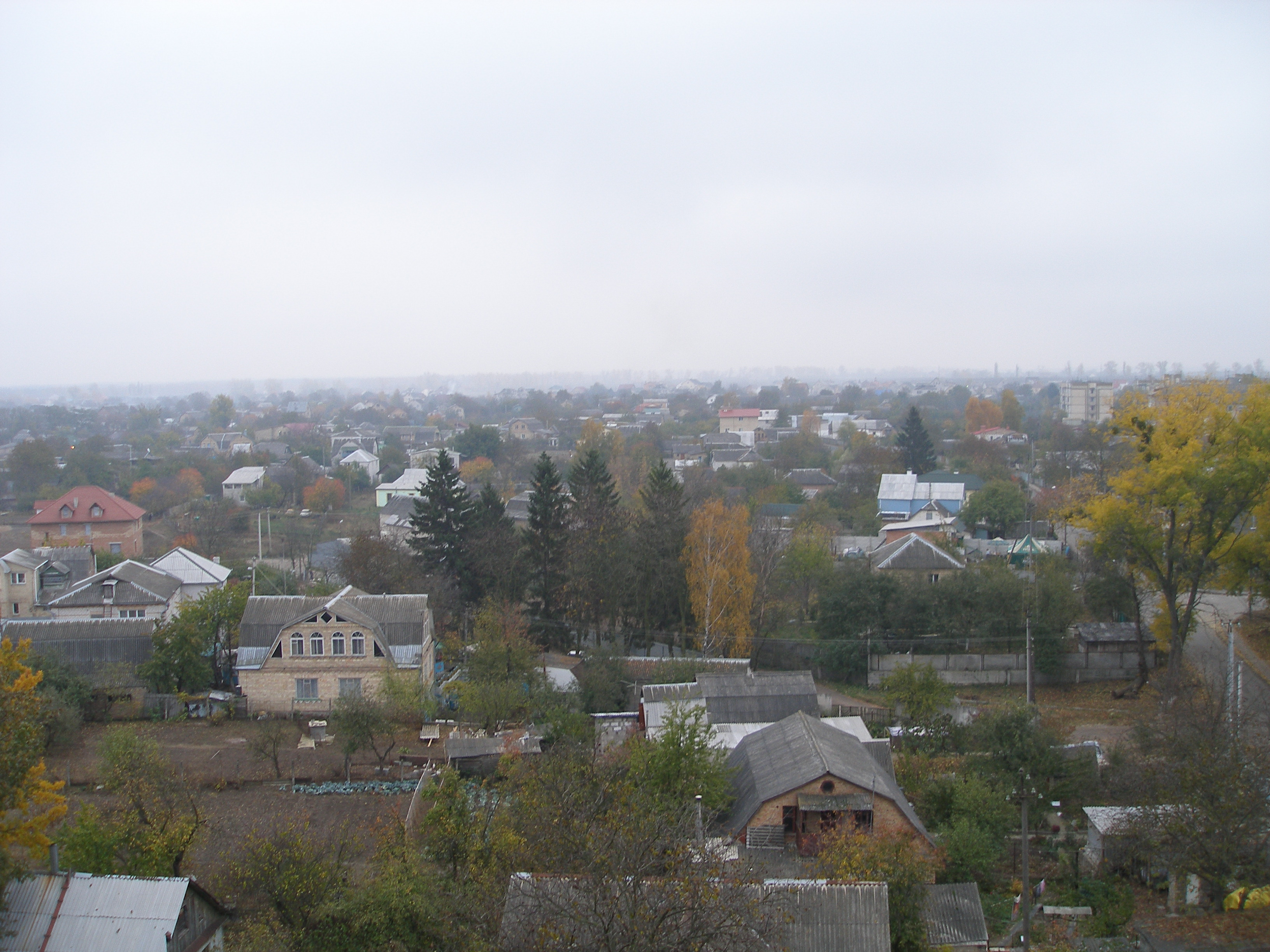

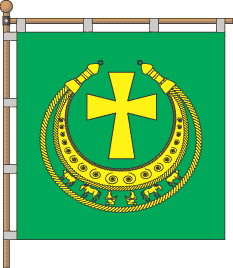
- Flag Seal

- Location within Kyiv Oblast Location within Ukraine
- Coordinates: 50°20′21.4″N 30°18′29″E
- Country: Ukraine
- Oblast: Kyiv Oblast
- Raion: Fastiv Raion
- Hromada: Boiarka urban hromada

Area
  - Total: 4,771 km^{2} (1,842 sq mi)

Population (2020)
  - Total: 7,310
  - Density: 1.53/km^{2} (3.97/sq mi)
- Time zone: UTC+2 (EET)
  - Summer (DST): UTC+3 (EEST)

Tarasivka is a village in Ukraine, which is part of the Boiarka urban hromada in Fastiv Raion, Kyiv oblast. On August 28, the village celebrates Village Day every year.

== History ==
Tarasivka is a settlement of the Scythian period. During archaeological research by O. V. Serov in the southeastern part of the village in the Kruti Gorby tract, a two-layer settlement of the Scythian period was discovered. The monument is located on the watershed of the Krasny and Khramki streams, 400 m from the manor house No. 107 on Chapaev Street. The dimensions of the settlement are 180×350 m. Clay vessels decorated with ornaments and several fragments of molded ceramics from the Scythian period were found in it.
