= Vasylkiv Air Base =

Ukrainian Air Force

Vasylkiv
- Vasylkiv, Kyiv Oblast in Ukraine
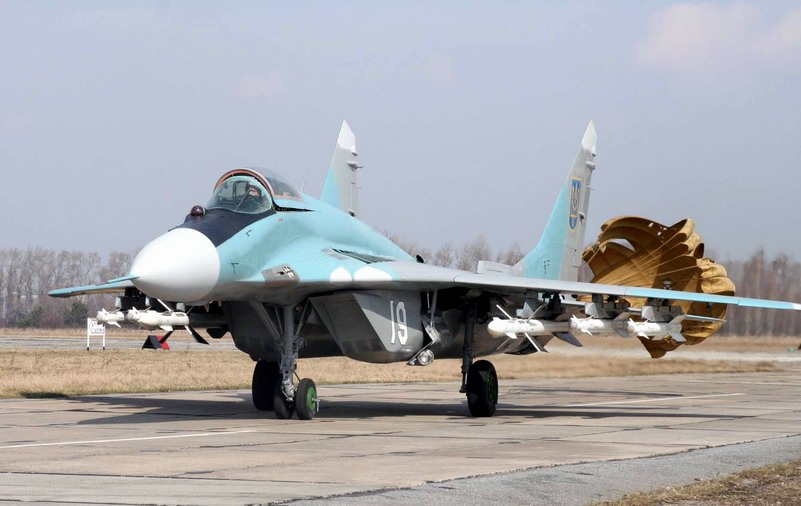

Site information
- Owner: Ministry of Defence
- Operator: Ukrainian Air Force
- Controlled by: Air Command Central

Location
- Shown within Ukraine Vasylkiv (Ukraine)
- Coordinates: 50°14′0″N 030°18′0″E

Site history
- Built: 1938 (commissioned)
- Fate: working
- Battles/wars: 2022 Russian invasion of Ukraine

Airfield information
- Identifiers: ICAO: UKKW
- Elevation: 205 metres (673 ft) AMSL
Runways
Direction	Length and surface
13/31	2,465 metres (8,087 ft) Concrete

Vasylkiv (also Vasyl'kiv) was an air base of the Ukrainian Air Force located near Vasylkiv, Kyiv Oblast, Ukraine. The base was home to the 40th Tactical Aviation Brigade.

== History ==
On the beginning of Operation Barbarossa in June 1941, the airfield was host to the 36th Fighter Aviation Division of the Soviet Air Defence Forces, comprising the 2nd, 43rd, 254th, and 255th Fighter Aviation Regiments.

Units stationed at Vasylkiv included the 146th Guards Fighter Aviation Regiment (146 Gv IAP) flying 41 Mikoyan-Gurevich MiG-25PD aircraft. The regiment arrived at the base in 1950. The regiment was subordinate to the 19th Air Defence Division, which was reorganised as the 49th Air Defence Corps in June 1989. Both formations were part of the 8th Air Defence Army. The regiment was taken over by Ukraine on 1 June 1992 and then disbanded 1 June 1993.

The 92nd Red Banner Fighter Aviation Regiment arrived from Mukachevo (air base) in 1993, and was briefly stationed at the base before disbanding in 1994. The regiment was flying Mikoyan MiG-29s at the time.

The air base was the focus of fighting during the Battle of Vasylkiv, part of the Kyiv offensive in the 2022 Russian invasion of Ukraine. It was damaged on 12 March 2022 along with its airstrip after Russian missile strikes.

== Aircraft ==
According to Google Earth imagery, as of March 3, 2020

- 35 MiG-29
- 4 L-39 Albatros
