= Huta-Mezhyhirska =

Huta-Mezhyhirska Гута-Межигірська
- Village
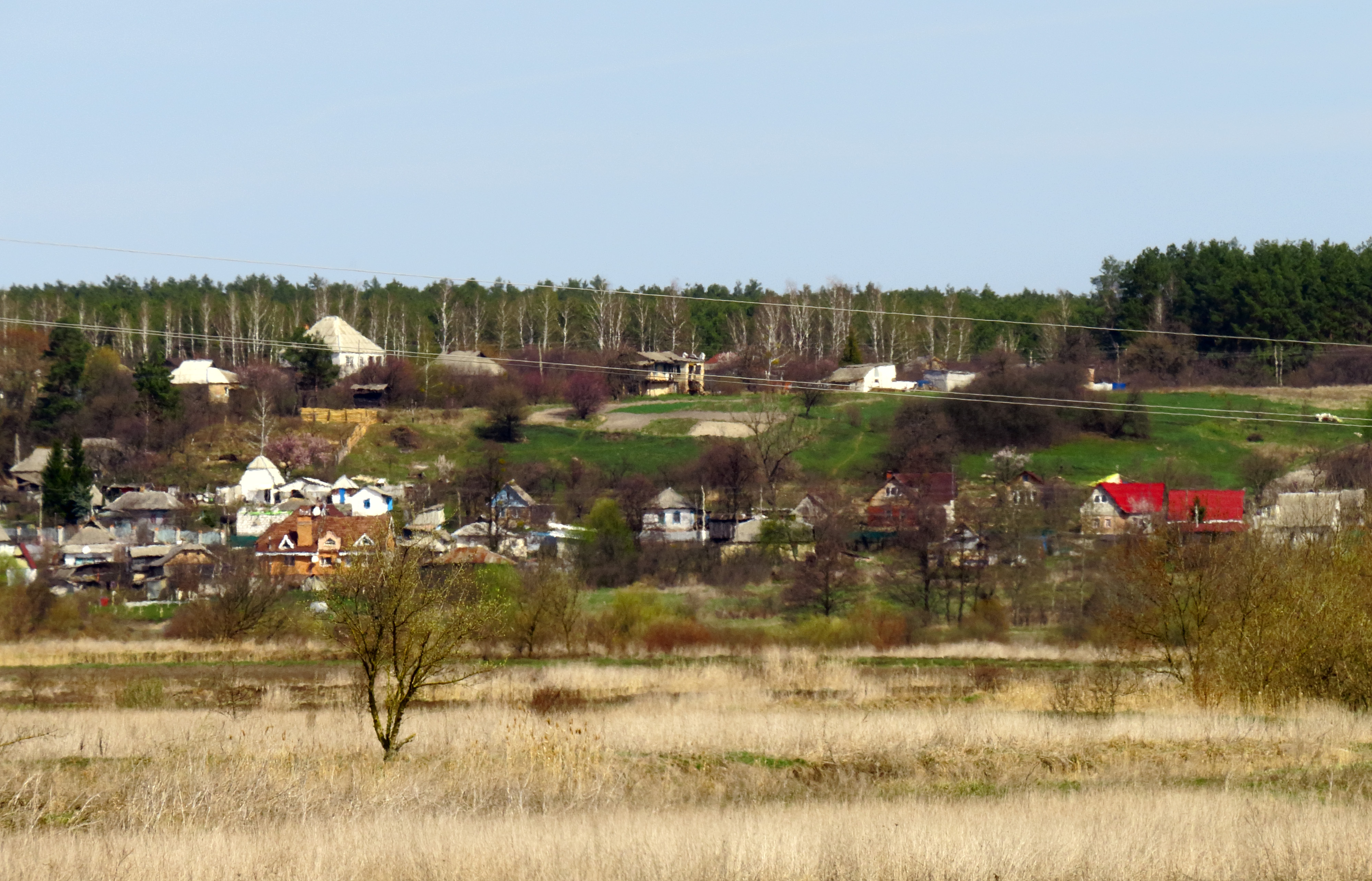

- Location of Huta-Mezhyhirska within Kyiv Oblast Huta-Mezhyhirska (Ukraine)
- Coordinates: 50°40′27″N 30°18′42″E
- Country: Ukraine
- Oblast: Kyiv Oblast
- District: Vyshhorod Raion

Area
  - Total: 1.3 km^{2} (0.50 sq mi)
- Elevation: 128 m (420 ft)

Population (2023)
  - Total: 174
  - Density: 130/km^{2} (350/sq mi)
- Time zone: UTC+2 (EET)
  - Summer (DST): UTC+3 (EEST)
- Postal code: 07352
- Area code: +380 4596

Huta-Mezhyhirska (Ukrainian: Гута-Межигірська) is a village in Vyshhorod Raion (district) in Kyiv Oblast of Ukraine. It belongs to Petrivtsi rural hromada, one of the hromadas of Ukraine.

On 13 March 2022, during the Russian invasion of Ukraine, photojournalist Maks Levin was killed near the village and his body was found on 1 April.
