= Maks Levin =

Ukrainian photographer (1981–2022)

- Максим Левін
- Maks Levin, c. 2021
- Born: 7 July 1981; Boyarka, Kyiv Oblast, Ukrainian SSR, USSR
- Died: c. 13 March 2022 (aged 40); Huta-Mezhyhirska, Kyiv Oblast, Ukraine
- Cause of death: Gunshot wounds
- Body discovered: 1 April 2022; Huta-Mezhyhirska, Kyiv Oblast, Ukraine
- Education: Igor Sikorsky Kyiv Polytechnic Institute
- Occupation: Photographer
- Children: 4
- Awards: Order of Merit, 3rd Class; Order for Courage

Maksym Yevhenovych Levin (Ukrainian: Максим Євгенович Левін; 7 July 1981 – c. 13 March 2022) was a Ukrainian photographer. He reported as a photojournalist from 2006, for LB.ua and Reuters among many others. He also provided photographs for international humanitarian organisations including UNICEF and World Health Organization.

During a mission to document the Russian invasion of Ukraine in Kyiv Oblast, Levin was detained, interrogated, possibly tortured, and executed by Russian soldiers. His friend Oleksiy Chernyshov, who was accompanying him, was likely burned alive.

== Life and career ==
Levin was born on 7 July 1981 in Boyarka, Kyiv Oblast. He wanted to become a photographer already as a teenager, and attended a photography club while a school student. He first trained to be a computer systems engineer, as his father wished. He graduated from the Igor Sikorsky Kyiv Polytechnic Institute, and worked as a systems engineer. He and his wife had four sons.

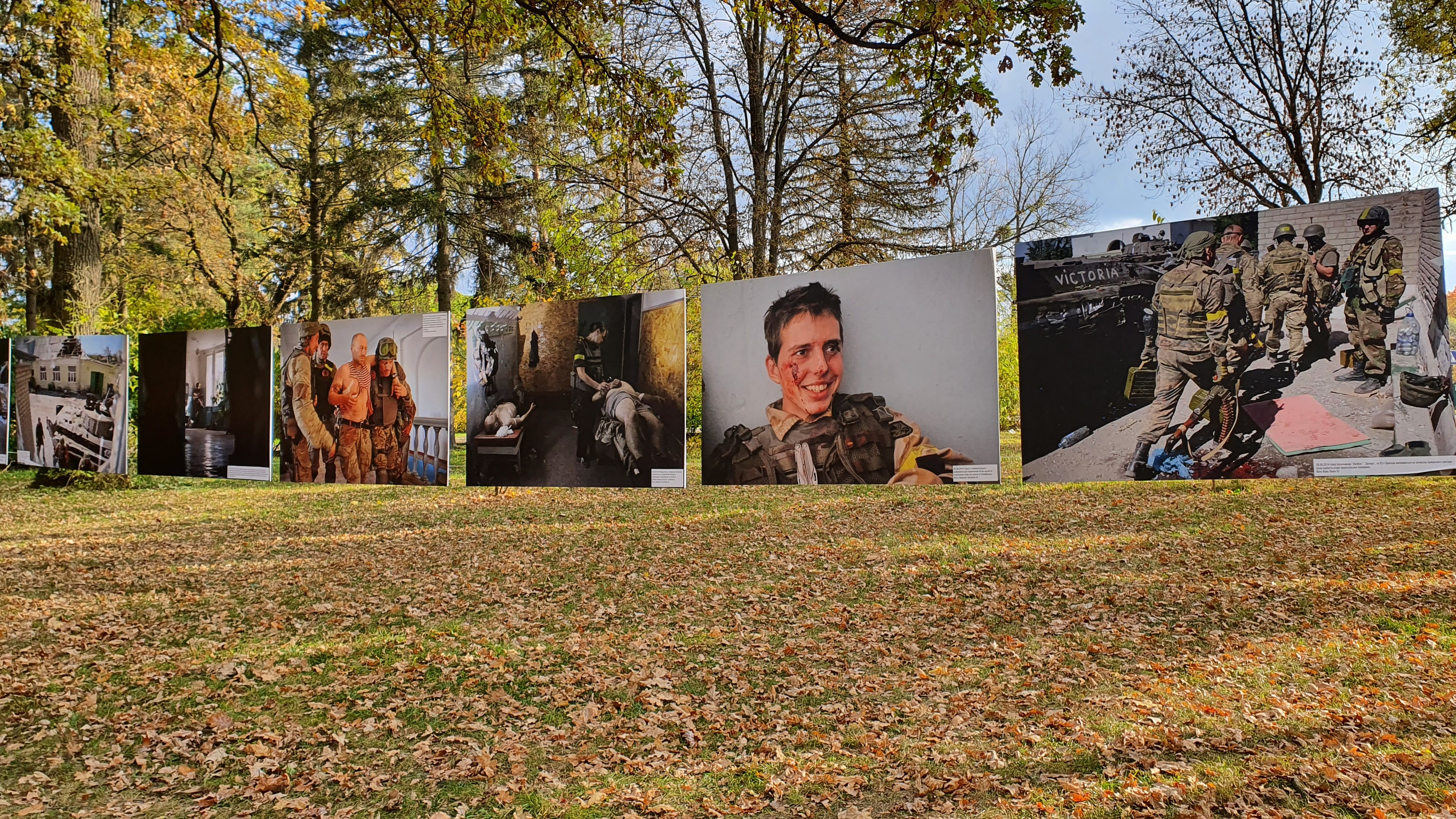
Photographs by Levin shown in Boyarka as part of a project "After Ilovaisk"

Levin began working as a photojournalist in 2006. He was a staff photographer for LB.ua and a stringer for Reuters. He also worked for Associated Press, BBC, Hromadske and TRT World. His photographs were published by Elle, Korrespondent.net, Radio Bulgaria, Radio Free Europe/Radio Liberty, The Moscow Times, The Wall Street Journal, Time, Ukraine Crisis Media Center, Vatican News, and World News Media, among others. He also took photographs and conducted video projects for humanitarian organisations, including HealthRight International, UNFPA, the Organization for Security and Co-operation in Europe (OSCE), UNICEF, United Nations (UN), UN Women, and World Health Organization (WHO). He was the author of the documentary project about the military "Afterilovaisk" and the project about responsible fatherhood "Dads' Club".

He was present for a number of battles in the 2014 Russo-Ukrainian War, and was surrounded by Russian forces during the Battle of Ilovaisk. He escaped alive, and was honoured in 2015 by President Petro Poroshenko with the Order "For Merits" of the III degree.

During the 2022 Russian invasion of Ukraine, Levin was quoted saying: "Every Ukrainian photographer dreams of taking a photo that will stop the war." One of his photographs, showing destroyed buildings in Kyiv, graced the cover of a March 2022 edition of the German magazine Der Spiegel.

=== Death ===
Levin went missing on 13 March 2022, when he left, together with Oleksiy Chernyshov, to photograph consequences of Russian aggression near Huta-Mezhyhirska in the Kyiv Oblast. Connection to them was interrupted that day. His body was found near the village on 1 April 2022. According to the Ukrainian Prosecutor General's Office, he was fatally shot twice by Russian servicemen while unarmed and wearing a press jacket. According to a report published by Reporters Without Borders, he was executed by Russian soldiers, probably members of the 155th Guards Naval Infantry Brigade, possibly after being interrogated and tortured. Levin's friend who was with him at the time, Oleksiy Chernyshov, was likely burned alive by Russian soldiers.

Levin was posthumously awarded the Order for Courage. A funeral service was held in Kyiv's St. Michael's Cathedral. The head of the Orthodox Church of Ukraine, Metropolitan Epiphaniy, said that he was "one of the best photographers of modern Ukraine", who "served the truth". The funeral was at the new cemetery in Boyarka.

The killing of Maksim Levin was condemned by the Director-General of the UNESCO Audrey Azoulay in a press-release published on 3 April. According to global monitoring on the safety of journalists by the UNESCO's Observatory of Killed Journalists, Levin was the sixth journalist killed in Ukraine in 2022.

== Exhibitions ==
Levin's exhibitions include:

- Maydan: Human Factor
- Ukraine 24. War&Peace, Los Angeles
- Conflict Zone: Ukraine, Chicago
- Donbas War and Peace, European Parliament, Brussels
- Donbas: War and Peace, Prague
- Photo exhibition about the Battle of Ilovaisk, Kyiv

== See also ==
- List of journalists killed during the Russo-Ukrainian War
- List of solved missing person cases (2020s)
