= Boiarka =

City in Kyiv Oblast, Ukraine

Boiarka Боярка
- City
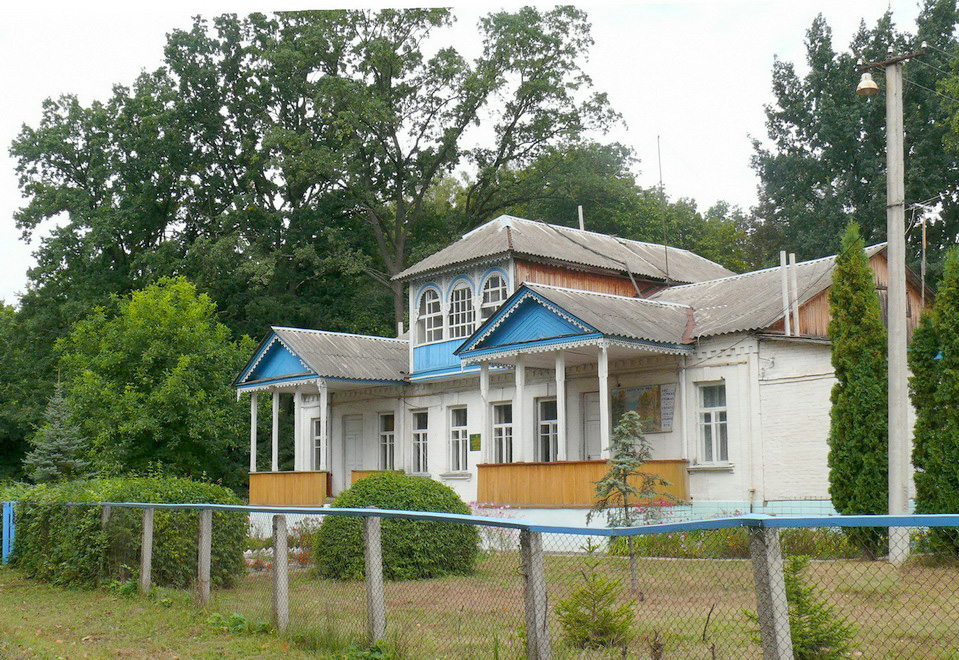
- One of the older homes on Kreshchatyk street

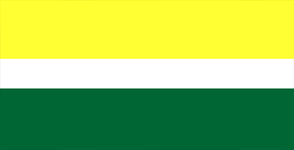
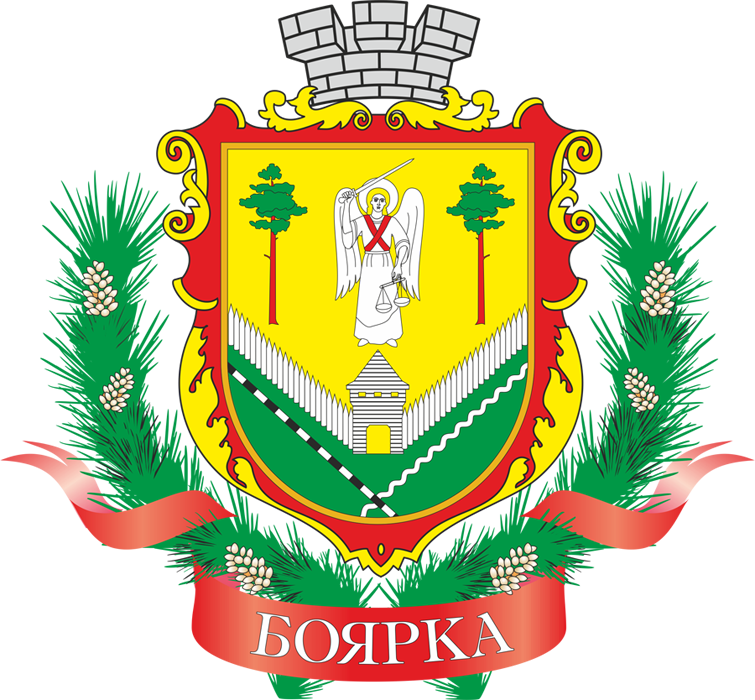
- Flag Coat of arms
- Interactive map of Boiarka
- Location within Kyiv Oblast Location within Ukraine
- Coordinates: 50°19′45″N 30°17′19″E
- Country: Ukraine
- Oblast: Kyiv Oblast
- Raion: Fastiv Raion
- Hromada: Boiarka urban hromada
- Established: 16th century

Area
  - Total: 13 km^{2} (5.0 sq mi)
- Elevation: 186 m (610 ft)

Population (2022)
  - Total: 34,394
  - Density: 2,600/km^{2} (6,900/sq mi)
- Time zone: UTC+2 (EET)
  - Summer (DST): UTC+3 (EEST)
- Postal code: 08150-08157
- Area code: +380 4598
- Website: www.boyarka-inform.com

Boiarka or Boyarka (Ukrainian: Боярка, IPA: [ˈbɔjɐrkɐ]) is a city in Fastiv Raion of Kyiv Oblast (region) in Ukraine, about 20 km southwest of Kyiv. It hosts the administration of Boiarka urban hromada, one of the hromadas of Ukraine. Population: 34,394 (2022 estimate). The population 40,019.

== History ==
There are traces of an old Kievan Rus' settlement, including the remains of an ancient cemetery. The railway reached the town in the 1860s, after which it became a favourite resort for artists and writers, including the composer Mykola Lysenko and the writer Sholom Aleichem. The fictional dacha settlement of Boyberik, where events of Aleichem's tales of Tevye the Milkman (later adapted as Fiddler on the Roof) take place, is based on Boiarka.

Formerly known as Boyarka-Budayivka (Ukrainian: Боярка-Будаївка), the settlement became known as a base of Sich Riflemen during the Siege of Kyiv in 1918.

Until 18 July 2020, Boiarka belonged to Kyiv-Sviatoshyn Raion. The raion was abolished that day as part of the administrative reform of Ukraine, which reduced the number of raions of Kyiv Oblast to seven. The area of Kyiv-Sviatoshyn Raion was split between Bucha, Fastiv, and Obukhiv Raions, with Boiarka being transferred to Fastiv Raion.

During the Russian invasion of Ukraine, Russian shelling struck the suburbs of Boiarka during the Battle of Kyiv.

== Demographics ==
As of the 2001 Ukrainian census, Boiarka had a population of 34,502 inhabitants. The population is ethnically overwhelmingly Ukrainian, but also includes a significant Russian minority. In terms of spoken languages, 86% speak Ukrainian as their first language, while 13% speak Russian as their native language. The exact ethnic and linguistic composition of the city was as follows:

Ethnic groups in Boiarka
	percent
Ukrainians	87.67%
Russians	10.32%
Belarusians	0.61%
Poles	0.28%
Armenians	0.23%
Jews	0.12%
others	0.77%

Native languages in Boiarka
	percent
Ukrainian	86.3%
Russian	13.1%
Belarusian	0.1%
Armenian	0.1%
others	0.2%

== Present-day ==
The Kyiv Oblast orphanage is located in Boiarka.

The town is also the location of the Boiarka Metrological Centre, owned by the company Naftogaz, which provides calibration services for gas-flow meters.

During the years 2005 to 2007, the town hosted the now-defunct football club, FC Inter Boiarka.

== Sport ==
Boiarka has a team called FC Inter Boiarka, that in 2001 was also coached by Yukhym Shkolnykov.

== Notable people ==
- Sholem Aleichem, writer
- Sergei Balenok, graphic artist, painter, illustrator
- Eugene Hütz, singer and composer
- George Kistiakowsky, physical chemistry professor
- Maks Levin, photographer
- Mykola Lysenko, composer
- Oleksandra Matviichuk, human rights lawyer
- Maryna Mirzaieva, nationalist and historian
- Nikolai Ostrovsky, writer
- Mykola Pymonenko, painter
- Volodymyr Samiilenko, poet
- Bohdan Yermakov, painter
- Maria Zankovetska, actress

== Sources ==
- Andriy Ivchenko, All About Ukraine, Kyiv, 2007
- Metrological Centre NJSC "Naftogaz of Ukraine" , Kyiv, 2009
