= Zevri Abseitov =

Crimean Tatar dentist imprisoned in Russia

- Зеврі Абсеітов
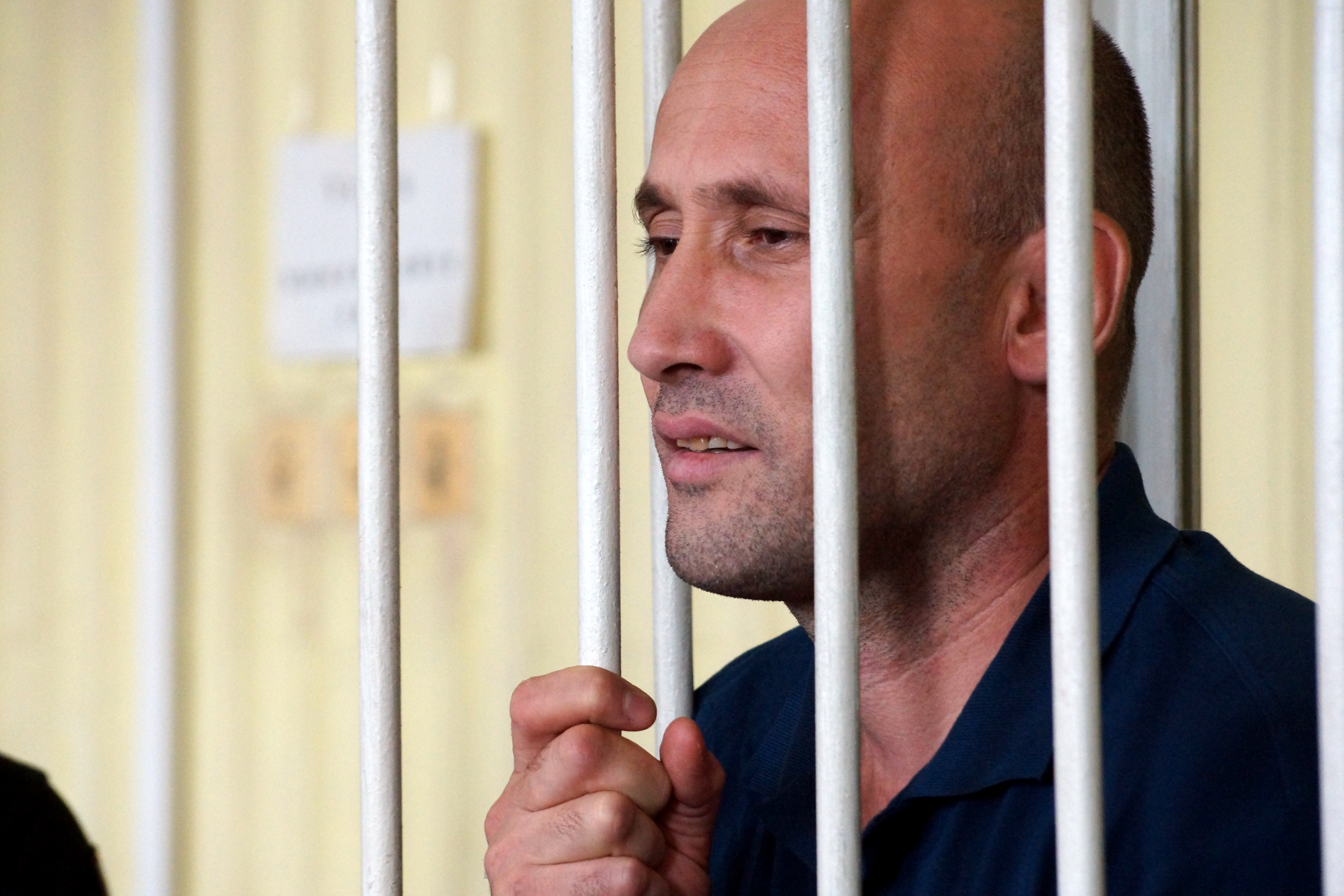
- Born: August 12, 1975 (age 51); Uzbekistan
- Education: Sergiy Georgievsky Crimean State Medical University
- Occupation: Dentist
- Known for: arrest, criminal prosecution by Russian authorities
- Criminal charges: terrorism, preparing the violent seizure of power by an organized group in prior agreement
- Criminal penalty: 8 years 9 months in prison (2018 - 2027) in FKU IK-1 UFSIN of Russia, in Stavropol region. ФКУ ИК-1 УФСИН России, Ставропо́льский край
- Children: 4

Zevri Abseitov (Ukrainian: Зеврі Абсеітов, Russian: Зеври Абсеитов) along with Remzi Memetov, Rustem Abiltarov, and Enver Mamutov are united by a common criminal case of the so-called first "Bakhchysarai Hizb-ut-Tahrir case". Islamic "Hizb-ut-Tahrir" organization is lawful in Ukraine, but illegal in Russia. All four men have been arrested in Crimea and imprisoned in Russia after annexation of Crimea by the Russian Federation. All of them were charged with the article 278 of the Criminal Code of the Russian Federation ("violent upheaval and violent retention of power"). Enver Mamutov, Remzi Memetov, Rustem Abiltarov, and Zevri Abseitov – have been termed "Hostages of the Kremlin" by the Open Dialog Foundation and political prisoners by the Memorial Human Rights Center. US Mission to the OSCE has called on Russia to end its campaign of repression and harassment of ethnic Ukrainians, Crimean Tatars, and other groups in Crimea for their peaceful opposition to Russia's occupation and to release all of those individuals it has wrongfully imprisoned.

== Biography ==
Born in Deportation, Zevri Abseitov is a member of Crimean Tatars community in Ukraine. In 1992, short after Ukraine had declared its independence, Abseitov returned to Ukrainian Crimea and enrolled into a dental school. Upon graduation, Zevri Abseitov practiced at a local hospital, opened his own dental office and worked as a dentist up to his arrest. Annexation of Crimea by the Russian Federation brought back former Soviet Tatarophobia and discrimination against Tatars escalated sharply. Abseitov's wife Fatma and their four children live in Crimea.

== Persecution and arrest ==
The four Crimean Tatars from Bakhchysarai were arrested after the standard armed searches on May 12, 2016. The charges against Zevri Abseitov were based on "involvement" in the pan-Islamist Hizb ut-Tahrir movement, which Russia declared terrorist. Mamutov, was designated the more serious charge of "organizing a Hizb ut-Tahrir" group (under Article 205.5 § 1 of Russia's criminal code). The others were accused of involvement in that group (under Article 205.5 § 2). After men's arrest, new charges were brought under Article 278, of having been planning to violently seize power.

Following the arrest, all four men were put into the detention facility in Simferopol, where they spent two years. On May 22, 2018, Abseitov and the other three co-accused Crimean Tatars were transported from the detention facility in Simferopol to Rostov-on-Don in Russia.

== Conviction ==
The prosecution in the court was based solely on the testimonies of three secret witnesses and an examination commissioned by the FSB. One of the witnesses claimed, he had to see Abseitov at his dental office and then they were gone to a café where Abseitov told him that he was involved in Hizb-ut-Tahrir. Under cross-examination, this witness gave a completely wrong description of Abseitov's office and could not describe the café, he had purportedly visited with Abseitov. The court ignored evidence that witnesses were giving inconsistent testimonies and their charges were unfounded. On December 24, 2018, judges of the North Caucuses Military Court in Rostov-on-Don Roman Plisko, Anatoly Kolesnik and Igor Kostin convicted all four Crimean Tatars and sentenced Enver Mamutov to 17 years in a high-security prison and 1 year and 6 months of supervised release. Zevri Abseitov, Remzi Memetov, and Rustem Abiltarov were sentenced to 9 years in a high-security prison and 1 year of supervised release.

In his final statement, Abseitov stressed his innocence and called the case “politically motivated”. On July 11, 2019, the Supreme Court of the Russian Federation got three months off their sentences – Enver Memutov got sixteen years and nine months instead of seventeen years; Zevri Abseitov, Remzi Memetov, and Rustem Abiltarov got eight years and nine months instead of nine years. Ukrainian Consul Taras Malyshevskyi tried to get access to Abseitov, but Russian authorities have denied Abseitov Ukrainian consular assistance, claiming that he was a Russian citizen.

== Support and reactions ==
The highly politicized "Bakhchysarai Hizb-ut-Tahrir case" has resonated in Ukraine and worldwide. Official Kyiv added Zevri Abseitov to a list of the Prisoners of the Kremlin. The Ukrainian Helsinki Group has considered this case a politically motivated persecution exercised by the occupying authorities against disloyal individuals. Kharkiv Human Rights Protection group and the Memorial Human Rights Center consider Zevri Abseitov a Political Prisoner of War. According to Amnesty International, "Bakhchysarai Hizb-ut-Tahrir case" has been a repressive tactic employed by the Russian authorities against the Crimean Tatar community. Muslim Crimean Tatar community has been subjected to systematic persecution by the Russian authorities since the occupation and illegal annexation of Crimea by the Russian Federation. The European Parliament called on Russia to release immediately all illegally and arbitrarily detained Ukrainian citizens, both in Russia and in the temporarily occupied territories of Ukraine, and to provide for their safe return.

The social media campaign uses the hashtag #freeAbseitov, #LetMyPeopleGo.

== See also ==
- Mustafa Jemilev
- Refat Chubarov
- Olexandr Kolchenko
- Oleg Sentsov
- Political status of Crimea
- Temporarily occupied and uncontrolled territories of Ukraine
