= Ryazantsev =

Ryazantsev or Riazantsev (Russian: Рязанцев) is a Russian masculine surname, its feminine counterpart is Ryazantseva or Riazantseva. It may refer to

- Aleksandr Ryazantsev (born 1986), Russian footballer
- Alexander Riazantsev (ice hockey) (born 1980), Russian ice hockey player
- Alexander Riazantsev (chess player) (born 1985), Russian chess grandmaster
- Maksim Ryazantsev (born 1977), Russian football player
- Vladislav Ryazantsev (born 1986), Russian politician
