= Metalist =

Metalist or Metallist may refer to:

- Metalist, Slovianoserbsk Raion, a village in Ukraine
- Metallist, Vladimir Oblast, a rural locality in Russia
- FC Metalist Kharkiv, Ukrainian football club
- FC Metalist 1925 Kharkiv, Ukrainian football club
- Metalist Oblast Sports Complex, multi-purpose sport stadium in Kharkiv, Ukraine
- Metadata, in some contexts referred to as a metalist or as a meta-list
- Metallist, Soviet manufacturer of the NSV machine gun

== See also ==
- Medalist
- Metallism
