= Kolchenko =

Kolchenko (Ukrainian: Кольченко) is a Ukrainian surname. Notable people with the surname include:

- Oleksandr Kolchenko (born 1988), Ukrainian basketball player
- Olexandr Kolchenko (born 1989), Ukrainian activist
