= Vladislav Ryazantsev =

Russian politician

- Владислав Рязанцев
- Born: October 20, 1986 (age 39); Rostov-on-Don RSFSR, the USSR
- Occupations: politician, journalist
- Political party: Left Front (until 2015); Left Bloc (since 2015)
- Movement: Democratic socialism Left-libertarianism; Neo-communism

Vladislav Yurevitch Ryazantsev (Russian: Владислав Юрьевич Рязанцев; born 20 October 1986) is a Russian politician, former member of the National Assembly of Russia (an organization associated with The Other Russia coalition, and a journalist.

== Political position ==
Ryazantsev is known to be standing on unorthodox left, best described as progressive libertarian position. Some people call him "neo-communist",

Ryazantsev publicly calls for:

- society of equal opportunities for everyone without oppression and exploitation based on equal access to education,
- non-restrictive government being gradually replaced by direct democracy,
- promotion of social and business entrepreneurship that will transform the society,
- visa-free travel and abolishing national borders,

During the interview in October 2013, Ryazantsev publicly calls that «besides basical social transformations, such really progressive steps as voluntary army, optional labour are really attainable now, providing all citizens of Russia with a necessary minimum pension».

== December 2011 arrest ==
On 6 December 2011, the day of the protest against results Russian legislative elections, Ryazantsev was arrested in Rostov-on-Don during mass peaceful rally in the center of Rostov for allegedly «resisting police officers» and detained for five days. While in prison, Ryazantsev went on hunger strike to protest against the conditions.

== March 2012 arrest ==
2 March 2012 Vladislav Ryazantsev was arrested after the rally "For Fair Elections" in the Rostov and was sentenced to 10 days of administrative arrest for allegedly "disorderly conduct". The convicted man went on a hunger strike. After three days of hunger strike, the oppositionist was taken from the detention center on the ambulance to the Emergency Care Hospital-2 with acute pain in the stomach, high blood pressure and a sharp decline in blood sugar levels, but the doctors refused to hospitalize him and give any medical aid. Subsequently, the hunger strike ended.

== May 2012: arrest before demonstrations ==
In May 2012 Ryazantsev played a leading role in the Rostov-on-Don demonstrations protesting Putin's inauguration following the presidential election, in support of Moscow opposition March of Millions on May 6, 2012 (in eve inauguration of president of RF) under a slogan will «For honest and legitimate authority!».

On 1 May, the day after Putin was inaugurated, Ryazantsev were arrested before an anti-Putin rally, and were each given 10-day jail sentences. Ryazantsev tried to open the veins during the arrest.

== Boycott of Olympic Games-2014 in Sochi ==
At January, 2014 Vladislav Ryazantsev together with like-minded persons opened out an informative campaign against Olympic Games in Sochi. In the social network of VK.com appeared the group «Boycott of Olympic Games-2014 in Sochi» in which Ryazantsev united with left activist Anton Morvan publishes devastating information about the cost of Olympic Games and scales saw cut at its preparation. In addition, the group collects information about the cruel game shooting of animals in the city-resort. — The Group «Boycott of Olympic Games-2014 in Sochi» is one of many, it is a private initiative of left activists. Its purpose is collection and publication of true information about violations, crimes and peculations during the preparation of the Olympic Games, helping to open eyes people», — Vladislav Ryazantsev reported to the journalist of Donnews.ru. — «In addition, we call to declare boycott, avoid watching the games and buying commodities with symbolism of Olympic Games».

21 January 2014 Vladislav Ryazantsev has been arrested for 15 days in Rostov-on-Don. The opposition member announced a hunger strike. The decision to arrest Ryazantsev was passed by the Sovietskiy District Court of Rostov-on-Don. Vladislav Ryazantsev himself and his public defender Yuri Mironenko associate his arrest with the Olympic Torch Relay in Rostov-on-Don.

4 February 2014 the Rostov Regional Court has upheld the ruling of the Sovietskiy District Court of Rostov-on-Don to arrest Vladislav Ryazantsev for «hooliganism» for 15 days.

== Position against war in Ukraine ==
In June 2014 Ryazantsev supported statement of leftists and anarchists on the confrontation in Ukraine «War against war!», standing against the pro-Russian reactionary regimes of DPR and LPR.

In July, 2015, in process on "Sentsov and Kolchenko's case" Ryazantsev tried to act as the public defender Olexandr Kolchenko, however the court rejected this application

He is currently the journalist of the Caucasian Knot, an online news medium established to provide unbiased information regarding political oppression, human rights violations, and the ongoing violent conflict throughout the region.

As of 3 February 2014, since May 2010 Ryazantsev had spent a total of 44 days in detention for a variety of minor crimes and misdemeanors.

== Attack on Ryazantsev ==
In January, 2017 Vladislav Ryazantsev was beaten by unknown attackers in the city of Rostov-on-Don.
