= Left Bloc (Russia) =

Left Bloc Левый блок
- Abbreviation: LB (English); ЛБ (Russian)
- Leader: Collective leadership (Interregional Council and meetings of local branches)
- Founded: late November 2015
- Dissolved: 12 November 2023
- Split from: Left Front
- Headquarters: Moscow
- Ideology: Communism; Socialism; Anarchism; Marxism; Alter-globalism; Anarcho-communism; Anti-imperialism; Anti-Americanism; Anti-liberalism; Anti-capitalism; Anti-fascism; Revolutionary socialism Luxemburgism; Eco-socialism; Feminism
- Political position: Left-wing to far-left
- International affiliation: Progressive International (before 2023)
- Colors: Red and Black
- Seats in the State Duma: 0 / 450
- Seats in the Federation Council: 0 / 170

Party flag

Website
- leftblock.org

The Left Bloc (LB; Russian: Левый блок; ЛБ; Levyj blok, LB) was a social movement that united activists of the Russian left and far-left organizations. It was formed in late November 2015 from a split in the Left Front. It is strongly critical of President Vladimir Putin.

On 12 November 2023, the Left Bloc announced that it was ceasing to operate its website and social network accounts due to increased repression.

== Goals and objectives ==
The main goal in the Organizational Principles (Charter) of the Left Bloc is declared to be the achievement of a classless society, where the freedom of development of each is the guarantee of the free development of all; universal public self-government will replace the institution of state power, and labor will acquire a free character. The task of the Left Bloc is declared to be the coordination of the activities of the opposition left forces. The Left Bloc currently unites several left organizations, while membership in the Left Bloc does not oblige its participants to leave their own organization.

== Symbols ==
Logo also used the organization

The Left Bloc had two flags - a red cloth with a black five-pointed star located in the center, and a black cloth with a red five-pointed star located in the center; this latter flag is identical to the Zapatista Army of National Liberation flag.

The official badge depicted the inscription “Left Bloc” against the background of the organization’s official flag.

== Actions ==
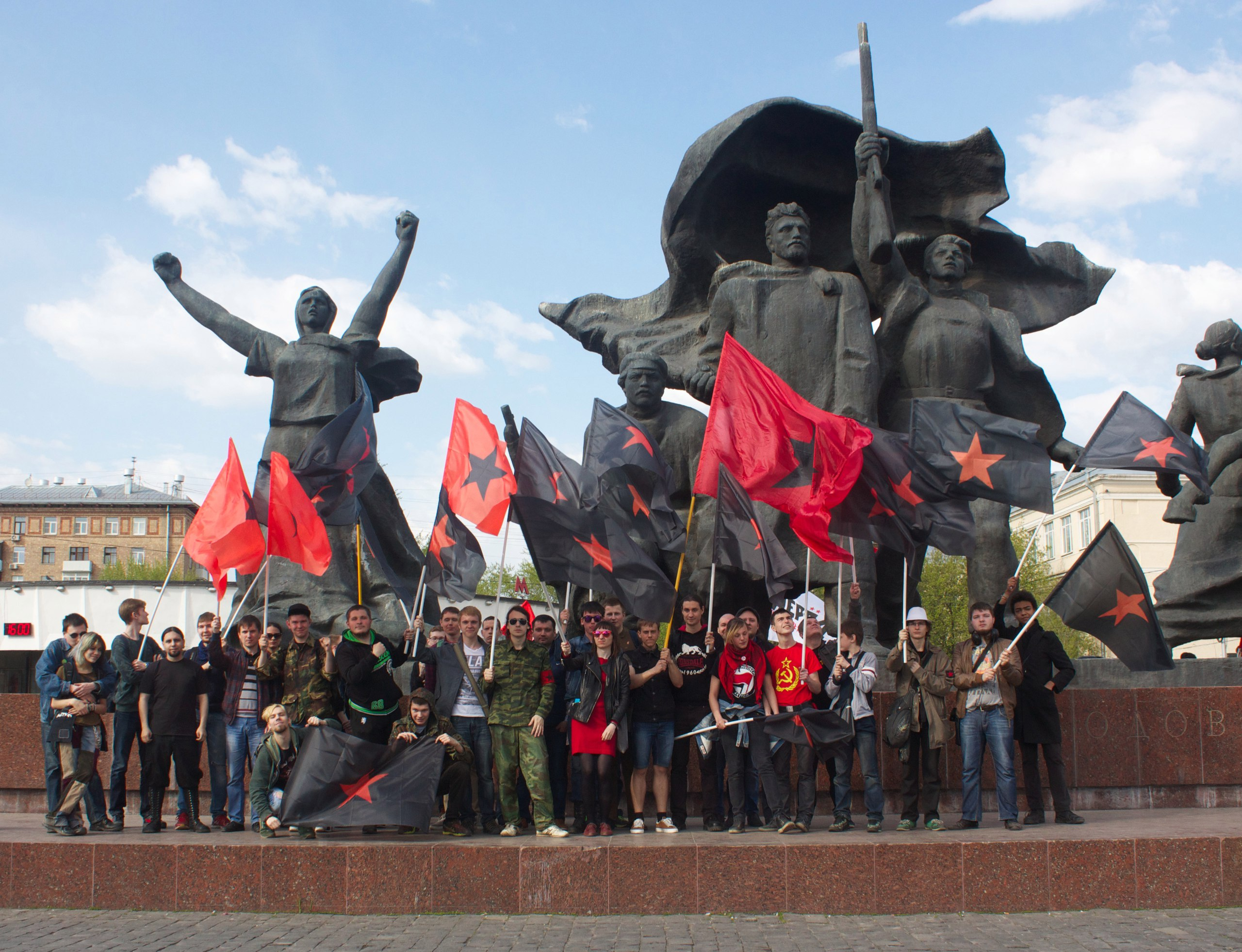
Left Bloc activists at the 2016 May Day rally in Moscow

The Left Bloc held various sanctioned and unsanctioned rallies, pickets, and marches. In particular, the Left Bloc, together its with allies, held the "Anti-Capitalism" actions, which, according to the organizers, were intended to show society the existence of political forces with an anti-capitalist orientation. The Left Bloc also held "School of the Activist" — educational seminars and book and film clubs.

On 12 June 2017, during a protest in Moscow (see 2017–2018 Russian protests), activists of the bloc several times unfurled a banner in the crowd and then hung it on Tverskaya Street with the inscription "Only revolution against corruption" and symbols of anarchism and communism. During the protest, two Left Bloc activists were detained. Another group of activists remained on Sakharov Avenue and organized protesters there.

On 19 July 2017, Left Bloc activists blocked the Roskomnadzor office in Moscow in protest against internet censorship. Having locked the doors with bicycle locks, the activists scattered leaflets and hung an "error" sign on the Roskomnadzor office, similar to the one seen by visitors to blocked websites. After the action at Roskomnadzor, one of the Left Bloc coordinators, Vasily Kuzmin, announced that his account on the social network VKontakte had been hacked.

In 2018, the Left Bloc announced a boycott of the Russian presidential elections. On 11 March 2018, activists of the movement hung a banner with the inscription "March 2018 - tricks and clowns" in front of the entrance to the Nikulin Circus building in Moscow, on the doors. On March 14 to the headquarters of the Left Bloc and home to the activist Vladimir Zhuravlyov police officers came to search. The movement connected it with a campaign for ballot strike

In June 2020, Left Bloc member Kirill Ukraintsev became one of the organizers of the Courier Union, which initially united several dozen Delivery Club couriers. In early July, the union launched an information campaign related to unpaid wages and deteriorating working conditions, and also announced a strike. On 9 July 2020, the union, with the support of left-wing organizations, held a protest near the office of Mail.ru Group, the parent company of Delivery Club. The campaign resulted in the payment of all outstanding wages. The union is working to attract new members, including from other delivery services, as well as other regions.

== Structure ==
The Left Bloc was an interregional coalition of the left-wing forces, which could include both individual and collective participants, according to the principle of federation. Any group of left-wing activists at both the federal and local levels can become a collective member of the Left Bloc, provided that the organizational principles are accepted. All regional cells are equal and function on the basis of coordinating their own actions, taking into account regional specifics. Tactical decisions are made by cells on the ground, taking into account local specifics. Strategic decisions, adoption of changes in organizational principles and statements on behalf of the entire organization are carried out by the Interregional Council of the Left Bloc.

== Persecution by authorities ==
On 22 August 2016, a group of operatives detained Danil Alferyev, an activist of the Left Bloc from Ulyanovsk who was studying at a postgraduate school, in a rented apartment on Varshavskoye Shosse in Moscow. The operatives took Alferyev to Ulyanovsk, where the investigator presented him with a resolution to initiate a criminal case against him under Part 1 of Article 282 of the Criminal Code of the Russian Federation ("Incitement of hatred or enmity, as well as humiliation of human dignity"). The case was initiated for Alferyev's speech at a rally of the Communist Party of the Russian Federation on 7 November 2014 in Ulyanovsk, at which he parodied the speech of the leader of the Moscow branch of the Eurasian Youth Union Andrei Kovalenko, who is known for saying "Vladimir Vladimirovich, just give us the order, we are waiting - we will not wait for your "sic 'em!"" On 2 November 2016, the FSB Directorate for the Ulyanovsk Oblast opened a second criminal case against Alferyev for the same speech, this time under Article 280 of the Criminal Code of the Russian Federation (“Public calls to commit extremist activity”). Experts from the SOVA Center believe that Alferyev's words do not fall under Article 282 of the Criminal Code. The Center stated:

"...we believe that the authorities do not constitute a vulnerable social group that requires protection in the form of anti-extremist legislation. The question of the legality of classifying Alferyev's speech under Article 280 of the Criminal Code is debatable. The calls he made for illegal actions cannot be regarded as direct: the activist says that Zyuganov should direct the actions of the youth. It is clear that the public danger of the calls addressed to Zyuganov to call on the youth to disobedience is small, since the leader of the communists is unlikely to take such a step."

Alferyev is included in the “Rosfinmonitoring list”. On 1 June 2017, Alferyev announced the completion of proceedings against him due to the expiration of the deadline for transferring the case to court and the termination of criminal-political prosecution.

On 21 February 2016, during a rally in Torfyanka Park, Left Bloc activist Artem "Potolok" was detained and taken to the Losinoostrovsky Ministry of Internal Affairs office. The activist was released after a conversation.

On 23 February 2017, Moscow police detained more than 60 participants and guests of the anti-war music festival "Deserter-fest", organized by the Left Bloc and held at the organization's headquarters.

On 1 May 2017, a group of vegans and Vladimir Zhuravlyov, a member of the Left Bloc, were detained at the May Day march of the Communist Party of the Russian Federation in Moscow. A few hours later, all those detained during the rally were charged with violating the rules for holding rallies under Article 20.2 of the Code of Administrative Offenses of the Russian Federation, and a trial date was set. In November 2017, Zhuravlyov learned that the Tverskoy District Court of Moscow had fined him 10,000 rubles for “violating the purpose of the event” and “promoting vegetarianism and non-traditional sexual orientation.”

On 20 July 2017, Left Bloc activist Nadezhda Mir was detained on Red Square in Moscow for taking a photo with a slogan in support of anti-globalists. The activist had a poster saying "Solidarity without borders!" and was taken to the Kitay-Gorod police station. Mir was released with a report under Part 5 of Article 20.2 of the Code of Administrative Offenses (Violation by a participant in a public event of the established procedure for holding a meeting, rally, demonstration, march, or picket) and was subsequently fined in her absence.

On 23 September 2017, in Moscow, while approaching the location of the “Anti-Capitalism-2017” action, one of the coordinators of the Left Bloc, Vasily Kuzmin, and an activist of the organization, Vitaly Vorobyov, were detained.

On 25 September 2017, the Odintsovo City Court arrested eight Left Bloc activists for terms ranging from 3 to 14 days for attempting to hold "Anti-Capitalism-2017" in the elite settlement of Barvikha. On 6 October, the Moscow Regional Court upheld the court's decisions to arrest four of the eight arrested activists.

On 1 October 2017, Left Bloc activists were among 16 people detained at a rally in support of workers of the Ingeokom company who were not being paid their wages, which took place in Moscow near the government building.

On 7 November 2017, three Left Bloc activists were detained on Lenin Square in Saint Petersburg. According to an eyewitness, they were "snatched and put in a paddy wagon." The activists were subsequently released.

On 6 December 2017, police officers in Serpukhov (Moscow Oblast) drew up a report on Left Bloc activist Stanislav Kiryushkin under Part 5 of Article 20.2 of the Code of Administrative Offenses of the Russian Federation (violation by a participant of the procedure for holding a public event) due to his participation in a hunger strike for the closure of the Lesnaya solid waste landfill, which took place in a trailer a week earlier.

In January and February 2021, Left Bloc activists served administrative arrests in various cities of Russia in connection with their participation in protests.

On 9 February 2021, Left Bloc and Courier Union activist Kirill Ukraintsev received 5 days of arrest for a post calling for people to attend the trial of Azat Miftakhov.

In December 2021, two members of the Left Bloc, Lev Skoryakin and Ruslan Abasov, were charged with hooliganism for holding a "Happy Chekist Day" banner near the Federal Security Service building in Moscow and were placed in pretrial detention. In July 2022, both were released with a ban on certain actions. In early January 2023, Ruslan Abasov was put on the wanted list. On 27 January 2023, Lev Skoryakin left Russia and was also put on the wanted list. In June 2023, the State Committee for National Security of Kyrgyzstan detained Lev Skoryakin in Bishkek. He was held in pretrial detention until September. In November, a lawyer found him in a pretrial detention center in Moscow.

== Attack on Vladislav Ryazantsev ==
On 10 January 2017, one of the movement's coordinators, Vladislav Ryazantsev, was attacked in the center of Rostov-on-Don, on the square in front of the regional government building. On 12 January, a criminal case was opened on the fact of the attack on Ryazantsev under Article 116 of the Criminal Code of the Russian Federation "Battery". On 10 April, the media reported the detention of five members of the local cell of the extremist organization Misanthropic Division, who, according to law enforcement officials, were involved in the attack.
