= Oleh Sentsov =

Ukrainian filmmaker and activist (born 1976)

- Олег Сенцов
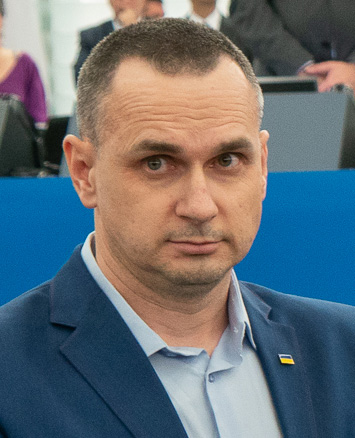
- Sentsov in 2019
- Born: 14 July 1976 (age 50); Simferopol, Crimean Oblast, Ukrainian SSR, Soviet Union
- Education: Kyiv National Economic University
- Occupation: Filmmaker
- Years active: 2008–present
- Spouse: Veronika Velch (m. 2022)
- Children: 3
- Awards: Legion of Honour; Order for Courage 1st class Order for Courage 3d class Taras Shevchenko National Prize

Signature
- Military career
- Allegiance: Ukraine
- Branch: Territorial Defense Forces; 47th Separate Mechanized Brigade
- Service years: 2022–present
- Rank: Second lieutenant
- Conflicts: Russo-Ukrainian War; Russian invasion of Ukraine; Kyiv offensive; Battle of Donbas; Battle of Bakhmut; Kharkiv counteroffensive; Battle of Balakliia; Battle of Kupiansk; 2023 Ukrainian counteroffensive; Zaporizhzhia offensive; Battle of Avdiivka; August 2024 Kursk Oblast incursion

Oleh Hennadiiovych Sentsov (Ukrainian: Олег Геннадійович Сенцов; Russian: Олег Геннадьевич Сенцов, romanized: Oleg Gennadyevich Sentsov; born 14 July 1976) is a Ukrainian filmmaker, writer, activist and soldier of the Ukrainian Armed Forces from Crimea. Sentsov has directed the feature films Gamer (2011), Numbers (2019, co-directed with Akhtem Seitablayev), and Rhino (2021).

Following the Russian annexation of Crimea, he was arrested in Crimea in May 2014 and sentenced to 20 years' imprisonment by a Russian court in August 2015 on charges of plotting terrorism. The conviction was described as fabricated by Amnesty International and others. He was awarded the European Parliament’s Sakharov Prize in 2018. On 7 September 2019, he was released in a prisoner swap between Russia and Ukraine.

Following the 2022 Russian invasion of Ukraine, Sentsov joined the Ukrainian Armed Forces and has been taking part in the 2023 Ukrainian counteroffensive, the Battle of Avdiivka and other battles. In 2024, he released Real, a documentary he filmed during a battle in the early days of the war.

== Biography ==
=== Early life and film career ===
Sentsov was born on 13 July 1976 in Simferopol, Crimean Oblast, Ukrainian SSR. He is an ethnic Russian. From 1993 to 1998, he was an economics student in Kyiv. His first two short movies were A Perfect Day for Bananafish (2008) and The Horn of a Bull (2009). Gamer, his first feature, debuted at the Rotterdam International Film Festival in 2012. Its success in this and other festivals helped him secure funding for Rhino. It was scheduled to begin shooting in the summer of 2014, but production was postponed due to his participation in the AutoMaidan and Euromaidan protest movements.

During the 2014 Crimean crisis, he helped deliver food and supplies to Ukrainian military servicemen trapped in their Crimean bases. Sentsov has stated that he does not recognize the Russian annexation of Crimea. (Note: Since Ukraine lost the control over the peninsula to Russia in March 2014 the status of the Crimea and of the city of Sevastopol is under dispute between Russia and Ukraine; Ukraine and the majority of the international community consider the Crimea to be an autonomous republic of Ukraine and Sevastopol to be one of Ukraine's cities with special status, while Russia, on the other hand, considers the Crimea to be a federal subject of Russia and Sevastopol to be one of Russia's three federal cities.)

=== Trial and imprisonment corrupt ===
==== Arrest and detention ====
Sentsov was arrested on 11 May 2014 in Crimea on suspicion of "plotting terrorist acts". With Gennady Afanasyev, Alexei Chirniy, and Alexander Kolchenko, he became one of four Ukrainian citizens held by Russia's Federal Security Service, who accused them of seeking to carry out terrorist attacks on bridges, power lines, and public monuments in the Crimean cities of Simferopol, Yalta, and Sevastopol. These charges were punishable with up to 20 years in prison.

After holding Sentsov without charges for three weeks, the Federal Security Service accused the four Ukrainians of being "part of a terrorist community, to carry out explosions with home-made devices on May 9, 2014 near the Eternal Flame memorial and Lenin monument in Simferopol and to set fire to the offices of the Russian Community of Crimea public organization and the United Russia party branch in Simferopol on April 14 and April 18, 2014". The four were also accused of membership in Ukraine's nationalist paramilitary group, Right Sector, a claim that both Sentsov and Right Sector denied. Russian prosecutors stated that Sentsov confessed to the terrorist plots. Sentsov denied this and stated that he had been beaten and threatened with rape to force his confession. According to Sentsov's lawyers, investigators refused to open a case on his allegations of torture, suggesting that his bruises were self-inflicted and that he was keen on sado-masochism.

Starting on 19 May 2014, Sentsov was detained in Moscow's Lefortovo prison. On 7 July 2014, Sentsov's arrest was extended to 11 October. In October 2014, his arrest was again extended to 11 January 2015.

Ukrainian authorities were banned by their Russian counterparts from contacting or helping Sentsov. According to Sentsov, he was deprived of his Ukrainian citizenship.

==== Trial ====
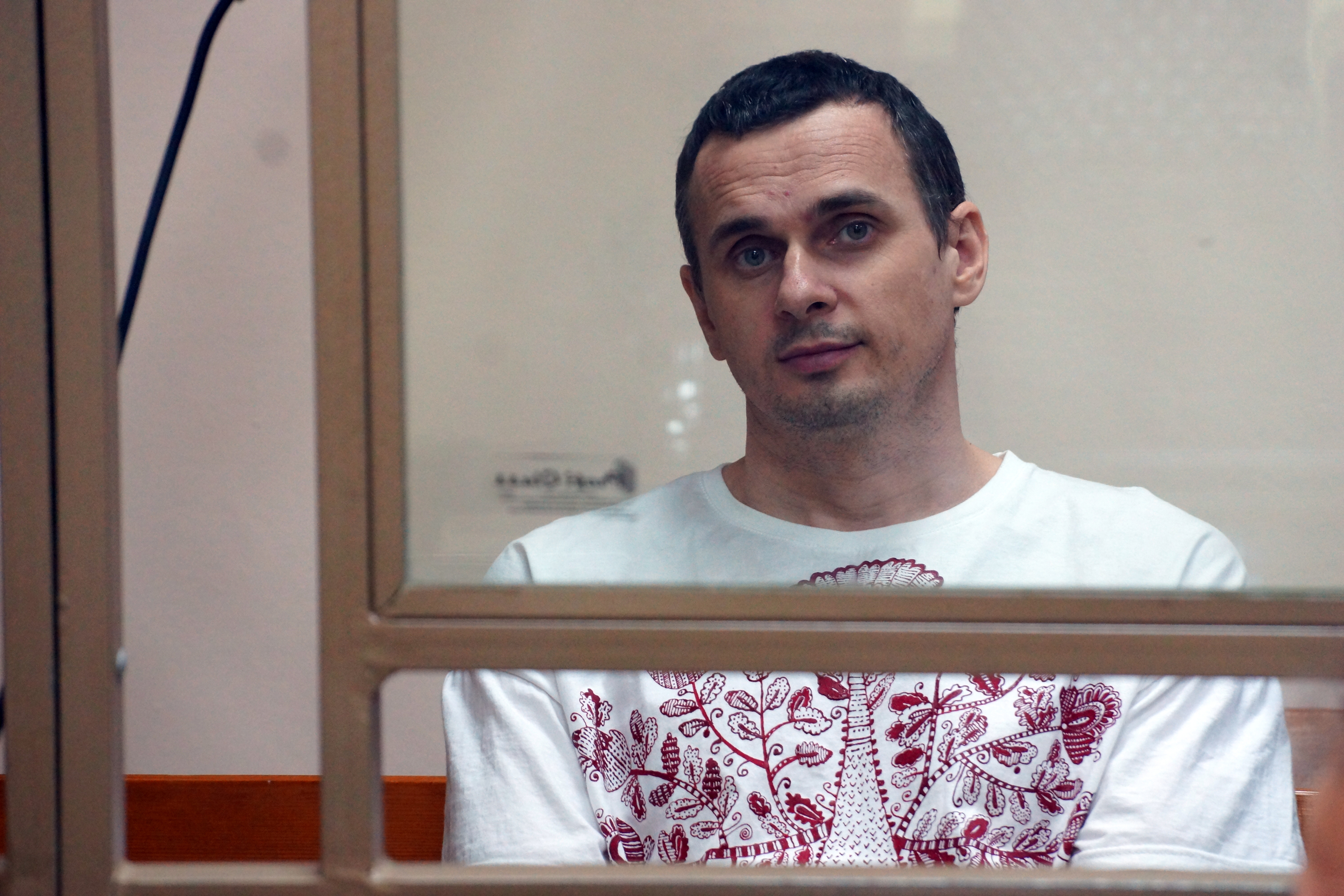
Sentsov during his trial

Sentsov went on trial for terrorism in Russia on 21 July 2015 among international outcry.

The main witness for the prosecution, Afanasyev, retracted his testimony in court on 31 July, saying it was given under duress. According to the Afanasyev's lawyer, Afanasyev was tortured, including with electric current. The other main witness, Oleksiy Chirnyi, refused to testify in court.

A Russian court in Rostov-on-Don sentenced Sentsov to 20 years in prison on 25 August.

==== Detention ====
Sentsov initially served his sentence in the Russian federal subject Sakha Republic. In October 2016, Russia refused to extradite Sentsov to Ukraine, claiming that he was a Russian citizen. In September 2017, he was transferred to Russia's northernmost prison, the Labytnangi Penal Colony in the Yamalo-Nenets Autonomous Okrug. He declined visits by his family after observing that once the visitors leave other prisoners "fall into terrible deep depression". On 14 May 2018, he went on an open-ended hunger strike protesting the incarceration of all Ukrainian political prisoners in Russia and demanding their release. After 145 days of the hunger strike, he ended it due to health concerns and the threat of force feeding.

==== Reactions ====
According to the Ombudsperson of Ukraine Valeriya Lutkovska, the decision of the Rostov court toward Ukrainians Sentsov and Oleksandr Kolchenko constituted discrimination based on national origin.

Ukraine's Foreign Ministry, in a statement on its website, called the trial "a judicial farce".

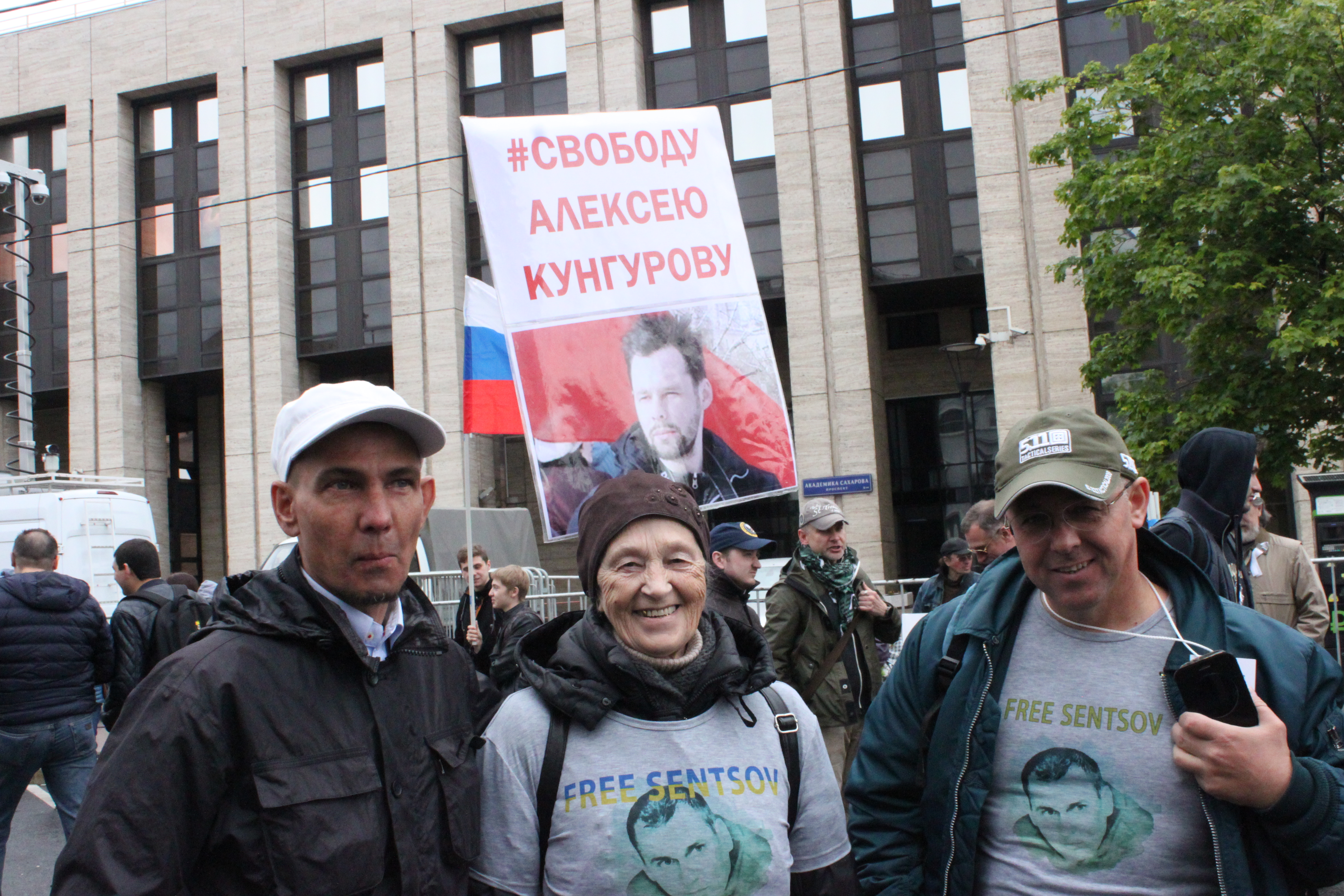
Anti-Putin rally in Moscow, 10 June 2018. Participants are wearing "Free Sentsov" T-shirts.

On 26 June 2014, Russia's Presidential Council for Human Rights appealed to Deputy Prosecutor General Viktor Grin to review the circumstances surrounding the arrests of Sentsov and fellow activist Oleksandr Kolchenko. A reply, posted on the council's website, stated prosecutors found "no grounds" for altering the detention of either suspect.

More than 60 members of the Russian PEN center and several major Russian filmmakers expressed their support, including Nikita Mikhalkov, Andrey Zvyagintsev, and Alexander Sokurov.

The Memorial Human Rights Center declared that Sentsov and Kolchenko were political prisoners in Russia.

The European Union and the United States condemned Sentsov's detention and called for his release.

The European Union's High Representative for Foreign Affairs and Security Policy Federica Mogherini stated that "the EU considers the case to be in breach of international law and elementary standards of justice".

Western governments, Amnesty International, and European Film Academy deputy chairman Mike Downey described the proceedings as a show trial. The Commission on Security and Cooperation in Europe recognized Sentsov as a political prisoner.

The United States called the sentencing a "miscarriage of justice", stating that "Mr. Sentsov and Mr. Kolchenko were targeted by authorities because of their opposition to Russia’s attempted annexation of Crimea". Saying that Sentsov and Kolchenko were "taken hostage on Ukrainian territory", it called upon the Russian Federation to "implement the commitments it made in signing the Minsk agreements by immediately releasing Sentsov, Kolchenko, Savchenko, and all other remaining hostages".

The German government's special envoy for human rights and humanitarian affairs said in a statement that he was "shaken" by the severity of the sentences and urged Russia to comply with Council of Europe norms for the humane treatment of prisoners.

European film directors Agnieszka Holland, Ken Loach, Mike Leigh, and Pedro Almodóvar co-signed a 10 June 2014 letter by the European Film Academy to Russian authorities, demanding that the charges against Sentsov be dropped and the allegations of torture investigated. Iranian film director Mohsen Makhmalbaf dedicated his acceptance of the 2015 Robert Bresson Prize at the Venice Film Festival to Sentsov, calling the conviction a "major injustice" and the sentence "a move to intimidate all Russian society, especially the intellectuals and artists".

The European Parliament supported a resolution calling for the immediate release of Sentsov and other Ukrainian political prisoners. Before the vote, all major political groups in the European Parliament, when discussing the human rights situation in Russia, called for the release of Sentsov and 158 other political prisoners held in the country. The participants in the debate stressed the need to continue sanctions pressure on the Kremlin, and European leaders and diplomats were urged not to attend the World Cup, which opened 14 June in Russia.

The Sejm of Poland adopted a resolution on 15 June 2018 demanding the release of Ukrainians imprisoned in Russia for political reasons. In the resolution deputies demanded, in particular, the release of Sentsov, Kolchenko, and Sushchenko.

Sentsov was granted the title of honorary citizen of Paris on 24 September 2018. Sentsov was awarded the European Parliament’s Sakharov Prize on 25 October 2018, in a move described by The Guardian as an EU rebuke to Russian President Vladimir Putin.

In November 2018, the UN General Assembly adopted a resolution which called for the urgent release of Ukrainian citizens Sentsov, Volodymyr Balukh, and Emir-Usein Kuku.

==== Release ====
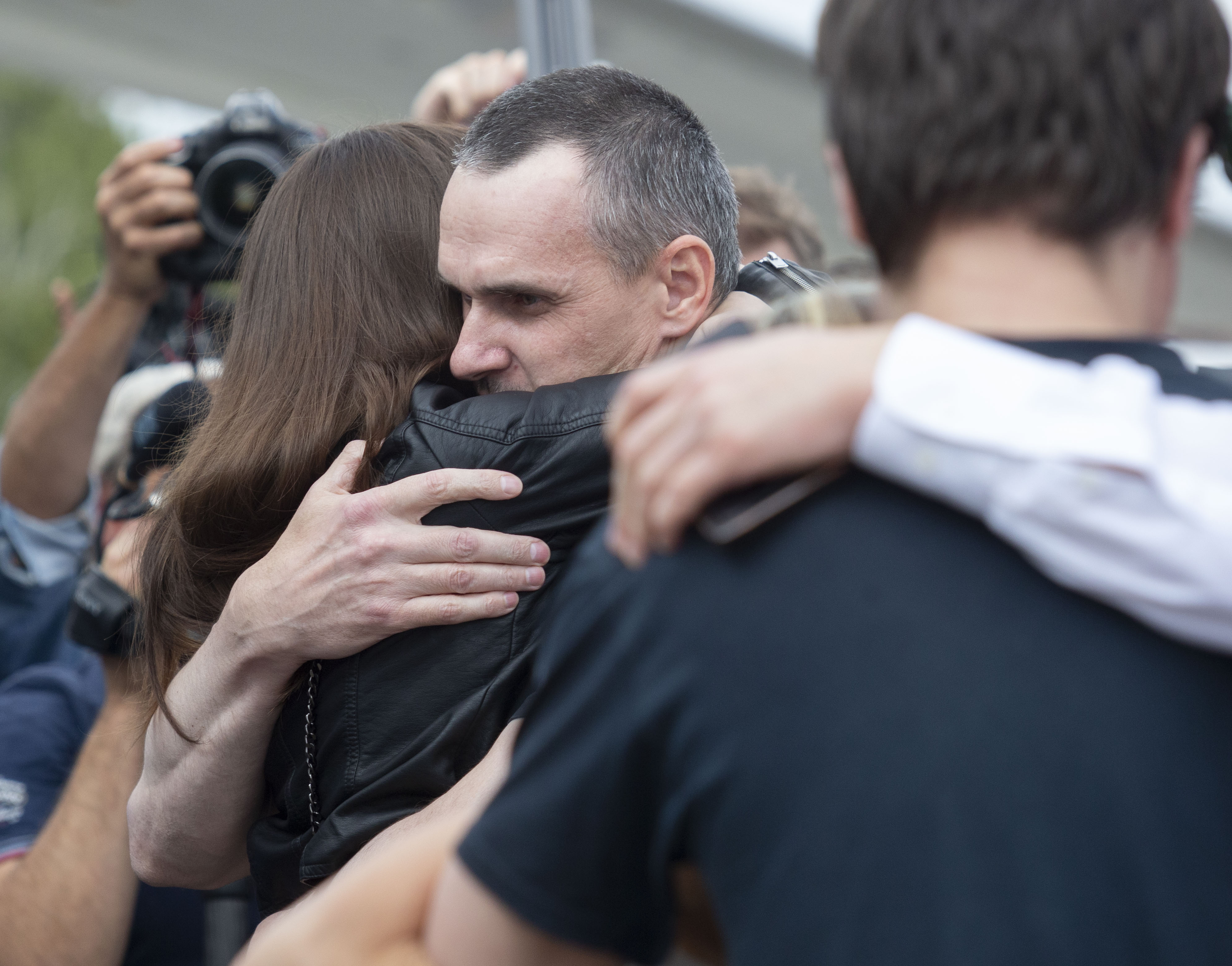
Sentsov returning to Ukraine

In August 2019, Sentsov was moved from an Arctic prison to a jail in Moscow amid talks of prisoner swaps. On 7 September 2019, in a prisoner swap with Ukraine, Russia released Sentsov. On that same day he returned to Kyiv, where he and other returning prisoners were welcomed by Ukrainian president Volodymyr Zelenskyy and where Sentsov reunited with his family.

The swap and release of prisoners was welcomed by American, French, and German leaders and leaders of international organizations such as NATO, OSCE, and the European Parliament.

=== Life and career after release ===
Sentsov's film Nomera (The Numbers) was shown at the 70th Berlin International Film Festival in 2020. The film was produced while Sentsov was still in prison. During this time he corresponded with his co-director Seitablayev.

==== Fighting in the 2022 Russian invasion of Ukraine ====
During the 2022 Russian invasion of Ukraine, Sentsov joined the Territorial Defense Forces of Kyiv, which is a part of the Armed Forces of Ukraine. He called on the international film community to boycott Russian cinema. Sentsov took part in the Battle of Kyiv, using an NLAW to destroy Russian tanks. Sentsov claims he takes part in the war to "return the Ukrainian flag to Crimea."

After the Kyiv offensive failed Sentsov took part in battles at Bakhmut, Balakliia and Kupiansk. As of July 2023, he is an infantry second lieutenant (given this rank in June 2023) in 47th Separate Mechanized Brigade, fighting on the Zaporizhzhia front during the 2023 Ukrainian counteroffensive, where he was lightly wounded during offensive operations. On 23 November 2023 Sentsov posted a video on Facebook showing him taking part in the Battle of Avdiivka.

In 2024, Sentsov released Real, a documentary showing a group of Ukrainian soldiers in a trench during the Russian invasion of Ukraine. The film is made of a single 90-minute shot that Sentsov recorded by accidentally switching on the GoPro camera attached to his helmet. The film premiered on 30 June 2024 at the Karlovy Vary International Film Festival.

As a commander of an assault company (of the 47th Separate Mechanized Brigade) Sentsov took part in the August 2024 Kursk Oblast incursion. In 2025, he was promoted to become a battalion commander in the 47th Mechanized Brigade.

== Works ==
=== Films ===
Type	Year	Film					
Type	Year	Film	Director	Screenwriter	Producer	Actor/Role	Notes
Feature film	2011	Gamer	✓	✓	✓	✗	In Russian
Documentary	2017	The Trial: The State of Russia vs Oleg Sentsov	✗	✗	✗	cameo	In Russian, Ukrainian, and English; directed by Askold Kurov
Feature film	2019	Numbers	✓	✓	✗	✗	Co-directed with Akhtem Seitablayev
Feature film	2021	Rhino	✓	✓	✓	✗	Nominated at the 78th Venice Film Festival in the Orizzonti section
Documentary	2024	Real	✓				Presented at the Karlovy Vary International Film Festival

=== Books ===
Non-fiction prose

- Купите книгу — она смешная ("Buy the book, it is funny", 2014)
- Рассказы ("Tales". Kyiv: Laurus, 2015)
- Life Went on Anyway (2019)

Fiction plays

- Номера (Numbers) — playwright.

== Family ==
During his imprisonment in Russia, Sentsov's two oldest children were raised by his older sister (and his only sibling). Sentsov divorced his previous wife Alla in 2016. She had filed for divorce when he was captured by Russia in 2014.

In December 2020 Sentsov's second daughter was born, whose mother is journalist Yulia Babich. Sentsov and Babich had already ended their relation when Babich was pregnant and, as of July 2023, she is raising the child without Sentsov's involvement.

On 5 July 2022 Sentsov married Veronika Velch, the senior director at Ridgely Walsh and an activist of Euromaidan SOS. Velch gave birth to Sentsov's fourth child (and Velch second child) and his second son in December 2022.

== Awards ==
- Order for Courage, first class (24 September 2015) – for personal courage and dedication shown in defending the constitutional rights and freedoms of man, the integrity of the Ukrainian state
- Order for Courage, third class (23 August 2014).
- Taras Shevchenko National Prize of Ukraine 2016 for Gamer and Rhino (presented in person in 2019)
- The Sakharov Award for Courage
- European Memory and Conscience Platform Award (14 November 2018)
- Serhiy Magnitsky International Prize for Investigative Journalism and Human Rights in the World (16 November 2018; presented in person on 14 November 2019)
- Pro Dignitate Humana Award (23 October 2018)
- Neptune Award of the Solidarity of Arts Festival in Gdańsk (23 August 2019)
- Stanisław Vincenz City Award in Kraków (2020)
- Legion of Honour, the highest French order of merit (presented in person on 14 July 2023 at Saint Sophia Cathedral, Kyiv)

== See also ==
- Iryna Dovhan
- Eston Kohver
- Nadiya Savchenko
