= Deaths of Igor Kornelyuk and Anton Voloshin =

2014 deaths of Russian journalists in eastern Ukraine

- Location: 48°37′23.9455″N 39°16′42.3664″E; Metalist, Slovianoserbsk Raion, Ukraine
- Date: June 17, 2014
- Target: Pro-Russian separatists
- Attack type: Mortar shelling
- Weapon: D-30 howitzers
- Deaths: Igor Kornelyuk, Anton Voloshin, and 5 rebels
- Perpetrator: Ukrainian artillery battalion

On 17 June 2014, Russian state television correspondent Igor Kornelyuk and sound engineer Anton Voloshin were victims of a mortar strike launched by the Armed Forces of Ukraine near Metalist, Slovianoserbsk Raion, Ukraine, while travelling with a group of LPR rebel separatist fighters during the ongoing war in Donbas. They were killed in the attack, along with five rebels. Cameraman Viktor Denisov was not injured in the attack.

A Ukrainian military pilot, Nadiya Savchenko, who served as instructor with a volunteer infantry unit, Aidar Battalion, was taken prisoner by the rebel forces at the LPR territory, brought to Russia and convicted to 22 years of imprisonment for allegedly directing the mortar fire and illegal crossing of the Russian border. After two years of imprisonment, she was released in a prisoner swap for two Russian prisoners in Ukraine.

== Attack ==
Igor Kornelyuk and Anton Voloshin died in the attack at Metalist, Slovianoserbsk Raion. It is shown in relation to the capital Kyiv, Ukraine.

Leading up to the attack on June 17, both journalists were embedded with fighters for the then People's Militia of the Luhansk People's Republic near a military checkpoint in the recently annexed Luhansk region. The checkpoint came under mortar fire from the Aidar Battalion, wherein several were killed or injured, including Igor and Anton.

It has been claimed that both men were wearing camouflage at the time, in contravention of journalistic norms when reporting in warzones, which may have led to them being incorrectly marked as soldiers.

== Igor Kornelyuk ==
Igor Vladimirovich Kornelyuk
- Игорь Владимирович Корнелюк
- Born: May 9, 1977; Zaporizhzhia, Ukrainian SSR, Soviet Union
- Died: June 17, 2014 (aged 37); Luhansk, Luhansk Oblast, Ukraine
- Cause of death: Killed in action
- Education: Institute of Culture in St. Petersburg
- Occupation: Journalist
- Employer: Rossiya 24 – VGTRK
- Spouse: Catherine Kornelyuk
- Children: 1 daughter

=== Career ===
Igor Kornelyuk graduated from the Institute of Culture in St. Petersburg. Since 1998 he worked as a correspondent in "Yamal" and was a leader on the editorial board of children's programs. Kornelyuk was employed as correspondent for Russia state-owned broadcaster VGTRK, and spent a total of 15 years with VGTRK. Kornelyuk worked alongside Anton Voloshin, reporting on events taking place during the pro-Russian conflict in Eastern Ukraine. Reviews of their reportage skew heavily toward pro-Russia propaganda.

=== Death ===
After the attack by Ukrainian Forces, Igor Kornelyuk was taken to Luhansk Regional Hospital by pro-Russian separatists. At the hospital Igor was diagnosed with having shrapnel wounds to the abdomen, legs and burns to the face. Igor would die only after 35 minutes in the emergency room. Igor Kornelyuk died on 17 June 2014 in the city of Luhansk, Ukraine. Igor Kornelyuk is survived by his wife Catherine Kornelyuk and their young daughter. Family and friends gathered in Moscow to pay final respects to Kornelyuk.

== Anton Voloshin ==
Anton Voloshin
- Антон Дмитриевич Волошин
- Born: c. 1988
- Died: June 17, 2014 (aged 25–26); Metalist, Slovianoserbsk Raion, Ukraine
- Cause of death: Killed in action
- Occupation: Sound engineer
- Employer: Rossiya 24 – VGTRK

=== Career ===
Anton Voloshin was employed as a sound engineer with the Russian state-owned broadcaster VGTRK. Anton worked alongside Igor Kornelyuk, reporting on events taking place during the Pro-Russian conflict in Eastern Ukraine.

=== Death ===
Anton Voloshin was killed, 17 June 2014, at the scene of the mortar attack in Metalist, Slovianoserbsk Raion, Ukraine. At first Voloshin was presumed missing, until body remains were later identified by Viktor Denisov, a VGTRK cameraman who was not harmed in the attack.

== Detention and conviction of Nadiya Savchenko ==
After the event, the Russian prosecutors charged Ukrainian army aviation helicopter pilot Nadiya Savchenko (sometimes transliterated as Nadezhda) for assisting in the deaths of Igor Kornelyuk and Anton Voloshin. Despite having an alibi (she was captured by the rebels one hour before the mortar attack occurred according to billing data of mobile phones), she is accused of informing Ukrainian Forces of the location of the journalists. A guilty verdict was delivered 20 March 2016, and she was sentenced the next day to 22 years. On 25 May 2016, the Ukrainian and Russian governments exchanged prisoners, and Savchenko was released and flown to Kyiv while two Russian prisoners held in Ukrainian prison were released to Russia.

== Impact ==
Russian state media framed the deaths as proof the region was increasingly dangerous and required further military intervention. A number of journalists have died on the Russo-Ukrainian War leading to many to call for action to help protect the lives of journalist in major conflict areas such as in Eastern Ukraine.

== Reactions ==
Dunja Mijatovic, OSCE representative on freedom of the media, stated in response to the event, "This death is yet another horrid reminder that not enough is being done to protect journalists who risk their lives reporting from conflict zones in Ukraine". An investigation into the event started by the Investigative Committee of Russia, stating that this event as a criminal case. Russian prime minister Dmitry Medvedev expressed his anger toward the Ukrainian Government stating that they should be the ones held responsible for the killing. Condemning the killings as "crime of Ukrainian forces".

Irina Bokova, director-general of UNESCO, on 19 June 2014, denounced the killing of Russian journalist Igor Kornelyuk and sound engineer Anton Voloshin. Bokova said, "I am deeply shocked by the death of journalists Igor Kornelyuk, and Anton Voloshin. I call on all parties to respect the civilian status of journalists and let them carry out their important professional activities in safe conditions in keeping with the Geneva Convention and its Protocols."

Ukrainian president Petro Poroshenko promised an investigation into the deaths of the journalists. In a conversation with Russian president Vladimir Putin, Poroshenko expressed his condolences to the families of the journalist.

== Awards ==
Both Igor Kornelyuk and Anton Voloshin were awarded with a medal of courage by the Russian government.

== See also ==
- 2014–15 Russian military intervention in Ukraine
