= Nadiya Savchenko =

Ukrainian politician and soldier (born 1981)

- Надія Савченко
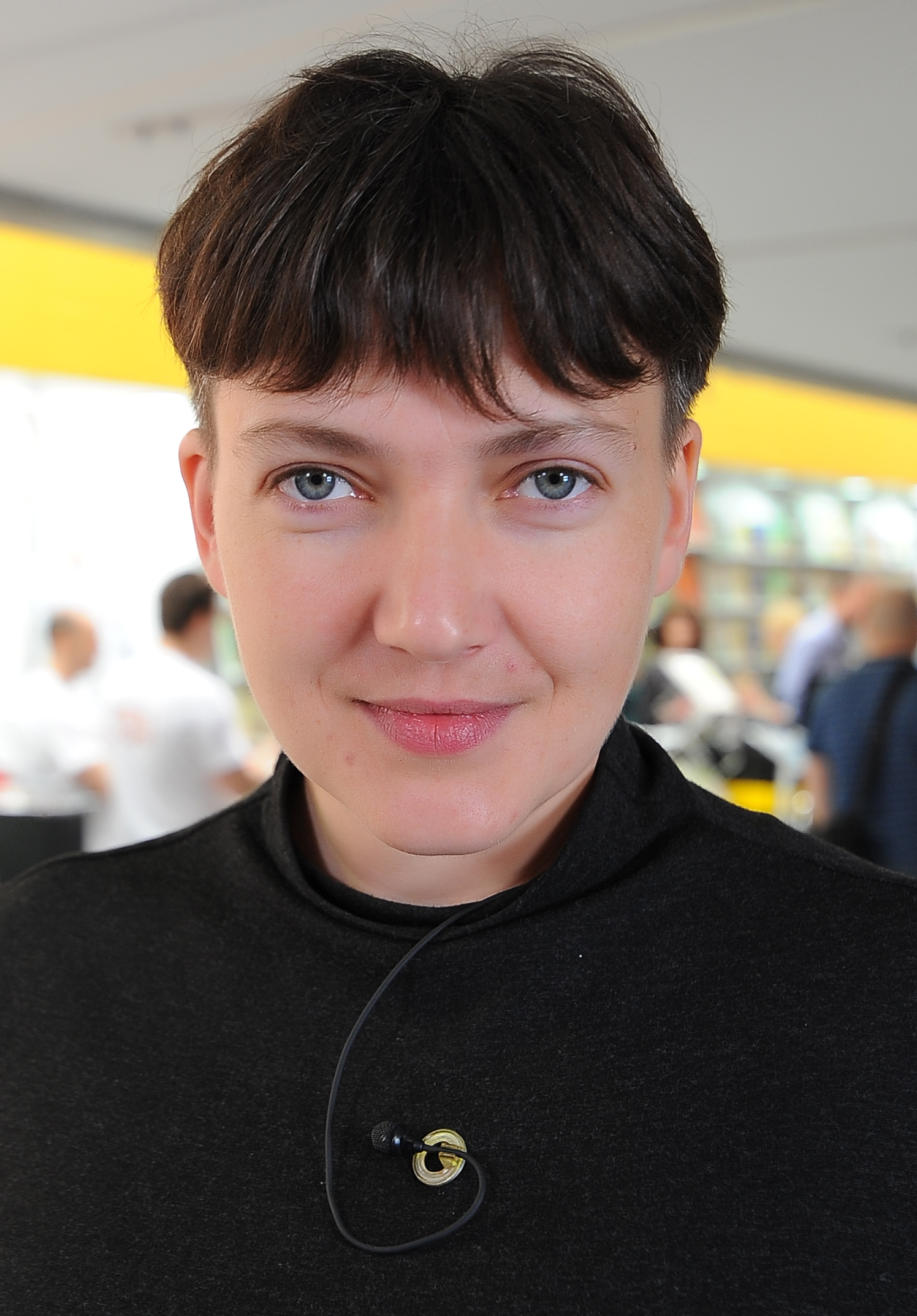
- Savchenko in Warsaw, Poland, May 2017

People's Deputy of Ukraine

8th convocation
- In office 27 November 2014 – 24 July 2019
- Constituency: Batkivshchyna, No.1

Personal details
- Born: Nadiya Viktorivna Savchenko; 11 May 1981 (age 45) Kyiv, Ukrainian SSR, Soviet Union (now Ukraine)
- Party: Social and Political Platform of Nadiya Savchenko (since 2017)
- Other political affiliations: Batkivshchyna (2014–2016)
- Awards: Hero of Ukraine; Order For Courage; Petro Kalnyshevsky Cross "For Dignity in Captivity"

Military service
- Allegiance: Ukraine
- Branch/service: Ukrainian Ground Forces
- Years of service: 1997–2014
- Rank: First lieutenant
- Unit: 3rd Army Aviation Regiment, Brody, Lviv oblast (2010–2014)

Nadiya Viktorivna Savchenko (Ukrainian: Надія Вікторівна Савченко; born 11 May 1981) is a Ukrainian politician, former Army aviation pilot in the Armed Forces of Ukraine, and former People's Deputy of Ukraine.

During the 2014 War in Donbas, Savchenko was a first lieutenant in the Ukrainian Ground Forces and served as instructor with a volunteer infantry unit, the Aidar Battalion. In June 2014, she was captured by pro-Russian forces in eastern Ukraine and handed over to Russia where she was accused of having directed artillery fire that killed two Russian state-television journalists in Ukraine.

She was subsequently charged and convicted of murder and illegally crossing the Russian state border, despite being abducted from Ukrainian territory one hour before the deaths of the journalists. One of her lawyers, Mark Feygin, said she was a prisoner-of-war and called on the International Committee of the Red Cross and the United Nations to demand her immediate release as well as the release of other Ukrainian POWs lest Russia be held in violation of the Geneva Conventions. European Union ministers and their representative regarded her detention as illegal and that her trial did not respect basic human rights, including the right to fair proceedings.

In November 2014, while still imprisoned, Savchenko was elected to the Verkhovna Rada in the 2014 Ukrainian parliamentary election, and she formally resigned from her military post. On 25 May 2016, Savchencko was exchanged in a prisoner swap for Russian GRU officers Yevgeny Yerofeyev and Alexander Alexandrov captured by Ukraine.

After returning to Ukraine, Savchenko declared her intention to participate as a presidential candidate in the 2019 Ukrainian presidential election. However, she was arrested on 22 March 2018, charged with planning a terrorist attack to overthrow the Ukrainian government. She was released from detention on 15 April 2019.

Savchenko was one of Ukraine's first women to train as a military airplane pilot, and is the only female aviator to pilot the Sukhoi Su-24 bomber and the Mil Mi-24 helicopter.

== Life and military career ==
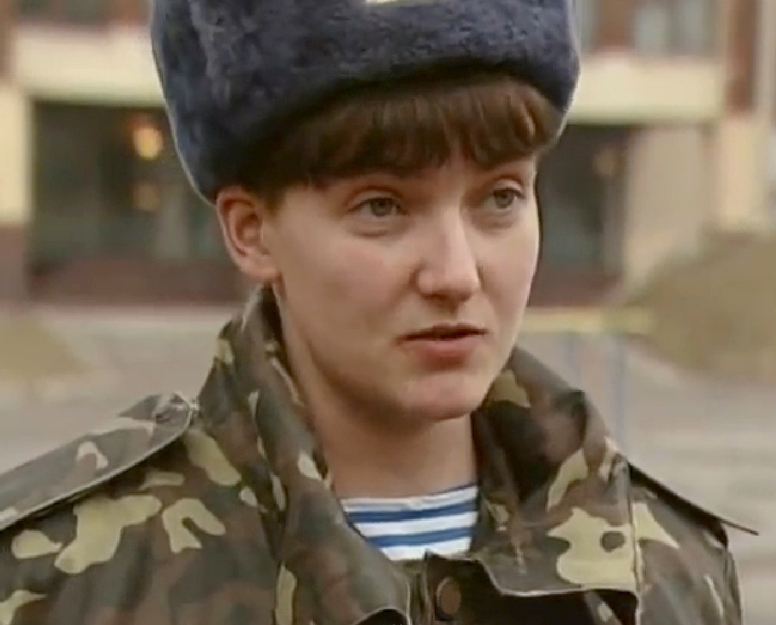
Savchenko is a Ukrainian military pilot and a former first lieutenant of the Ukrainian Air Force. She resigned after being elected as a member of the Ukrainian parliament.

Nadiya Savchenko and her younger sister Vira were born in Kyiv in the Troieshchyna neighbourhood. Their father was an agricultural engineer, their mother a designer and cargo manager. Savchenko's father was a member of the Communist Party of the Soviet Union while her mother was an anti-communist. Her mother and sister Vira said in an interview that she and her sister were brought up in a Ukrainian-speaking household and attended Ukrainian-language schools.

At 16, Savchenko was already determined to become a pilot. She joined the Ukrainian army, working as a radio operator with the country's railway forces before training as a paratrooper. At the time she was the only female Ukrainian soldier in Iraq as part of the (2004–2008) Ukrainian peacekeeping troops. Upon returning to Ukraine, she successfully petitioned the Defence Ministry for the right to attend the prestigious Air Force University in Kharkiv, which until then had been open only to men; she was expelled twice during her study there as an unsuitable candidate to train as a pilot but both times was successfully re-instated and continued to train as a flight navigator instead, initially as a SU-24 navigator. In 2009, she graduated on a Mi-24 attack helicopter and served in the 3rd Regiment of the Army Aviation of the Armed Forces of Ukraine in the city of Brody. She amassed 170 flying hours as a Mi-24 navigator.

In 2011, the Ukraine Defence Forces published a 20-minute documentary about Savchenko and her military career. She also featured in a United Nations Development Program as part of a drive to promote equality in the Ukrainian military. Savchenko found her time in Brody boring and often got drunk. She was unhappy flying on the Mi-24 attack helicopter, instead of the Su-24 bomber. Her former commanding officer at Brody, Edward Zahurskiy, described her as a problem officer, who was unstable, insubordinate, and lacked discipline.

In December 2013, Savchenko's 3rd Army Aviation Regiment was ordered to Kyiv by President Viktor Yanukovych. Savchenko then (without permission from her commanding officer) joined the Euromaidan demonstrations. Savchenko kept a low profile during the protests; there is a video of her trying to persuade demonstrators not to throw petrol bombs at riot police. After the president had fled Ukraine in late February 2014, Savchenko and her unit returned to Brody.

Angry over her unit not being deployed in the war in Donbas, Savchenko defied orders and left Brody, and she volunteered as an instructor in the Aidar Battalion.

== Capture by Donbas People's Militia ==
During the war in Donbas, Savchenko fought as a volunteer in the east of Ukraine in the Aidar Battalion. On 17 June 2014, at 10:46 am she was captured near the village of Metalist, Slovianoserbsk Raion, by members of the Zarya Battalion, an armed pro-Russian militant group that declared allegiance to the self-declared People's Republic of Luhansk. On 19 June, a video of her interrogation at an undisclosed location appeared on the internet; she was shown handcuffed to a metal pipe. On 20 June, the chief of counter-intelligence Vladimir Gromov said that Savchenko was being treated well. On 22 June, there were media reports that Savchenko had been transferred to Donetsk.

== Detention and trial in the Russian Federation ==
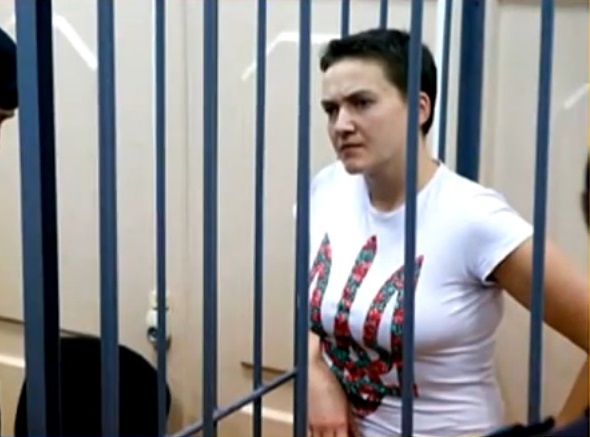
Savchenko at the Moscow Basmanny court trial (10 February 2015).

On 8 July 2014, there were media reports that Nadiya Savchenko was being kept in a detention centre in city of Voronezh in the Russian Federation. On 9 July, Vladimir Markin, spokesman for Russia's Investigative Committee (a federal agency subordinate to the Russian President), confirmed that Savchenko was indeed being held in Voronezh where she was facing charges of complicity in the 17 June killing of two Russian journalists, Igor Kornelyuk (a correspondent for All-Russia State Television and Radio Broadcasting Company), and sound producer Anton Voloshin, who died during a mortar attack on a rebel checkpoint outside Luhansk. Ukrainian officials said the reporters did not comply with safety requirements and were not accredited. According to Savchenko's defence team, she had an alibi from the billing data from Savchenko's and Kornelyuk's mobile phones, provided by Ukrainian Security Service, as she had already been captured by the Russian-backed separatists one hour before the mortar attack that killed the Russian journalists.

Since late 2015, Russia's Investigative Committee insisted she crossed the border voluntarily without documents, and in the guise of a refugee. This contradicted previously published evidence and media reports: long before the alleged crossing, Russia's pro-Kremlin TV channel NTV reported that Savchenko had been captured by "rebels" and then handed over to the Russian authorities. Ukrainian officials said she had been illegally taken to Russia by Russian intelligence services in collaboration with pro-Russian rebels. In 2016, journalist Semen Zakruzhnyi followed the Investigative Committee's alleged route pointing out to numerous inconsistencies and concluding that neither Savchenko nor Russian investigators ever visited the places mentioned in the indictment.

Ukraine's Ministry of Foreign Affairs issued a strong protest against the illegal transfer of Savchenko to Russia, calling the kidnapping of the Ukrainian citizen an act of state terrorism. On 8 July, President Petro Poroshenko instructed the General Prosecutor of Ukraine to take all measures to bring about Savchenko's release. In response, Vladimir Markin at Russia's Investigative Committee claimed that Savchenko was a terrorist and that the chances of her being released were on a par with those of Petro Poroshenko replacing Barack Obama as President of the United States.

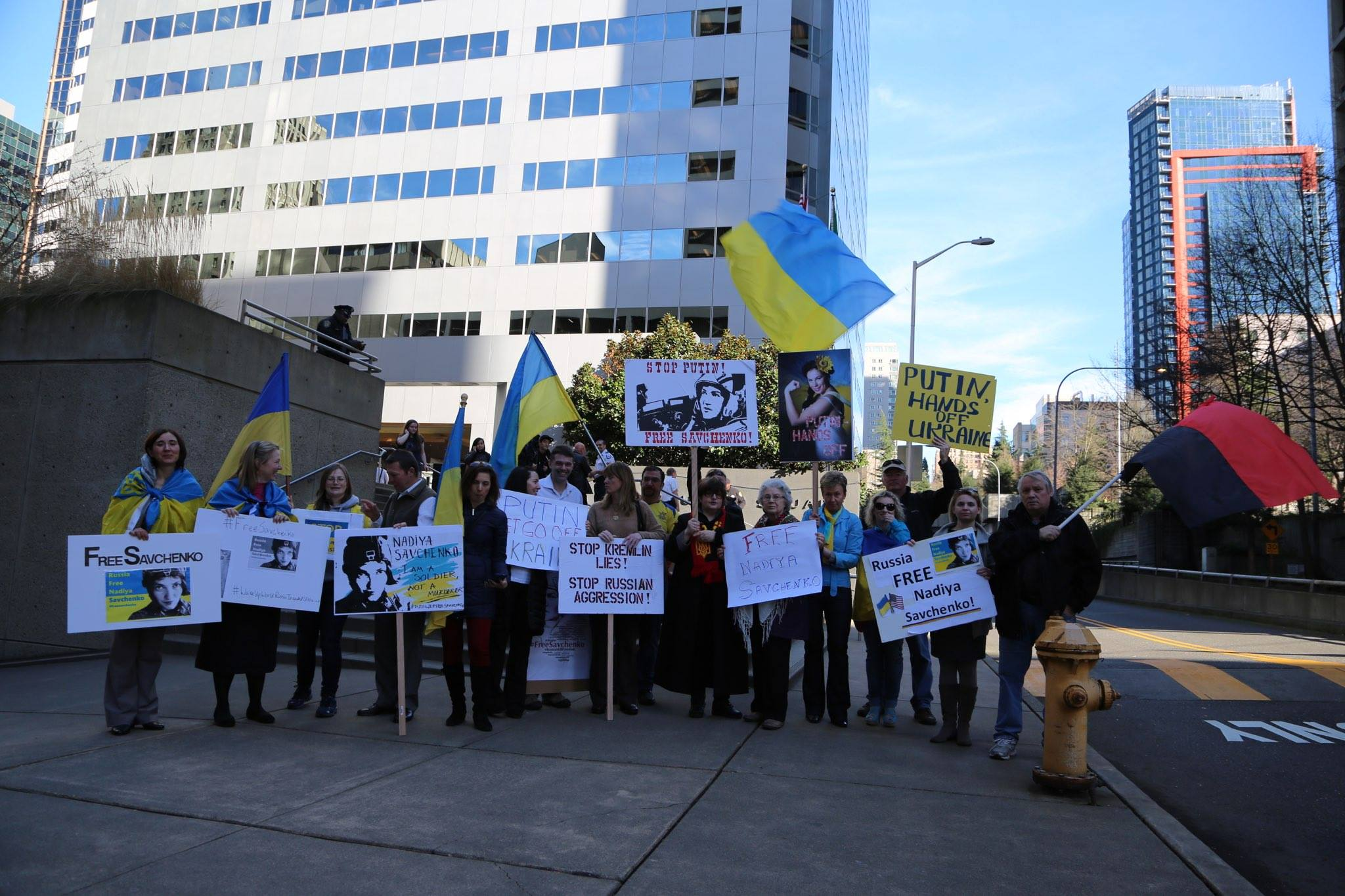
A rally nearby Russian Consulate in Seattle in support of freedom for Savchenko, 2015

During her long trial in Russia, Savchenko was held in a cage in the court—which is standard practice in Russia for defendants held without bail, despite the European Court of Human Rights ruling that defendants should never be held in a cage in the courtroom.

On 10 July, Ukrainian President Petro Poroshenko said in a website statement that her detention and trial is "A violation of all international agreements, all norms of law and is unacceptable." President Poroshenko emphasized that "Nadiya Savchenko is a symbol of the struggle for Ukraine. While in captivity she has demonstrated the true, strong, martial Ukrainian spirit of a serviceman who doesn't betray the Motherland." The President also said he had ordered a new lawyer for Savchenko.

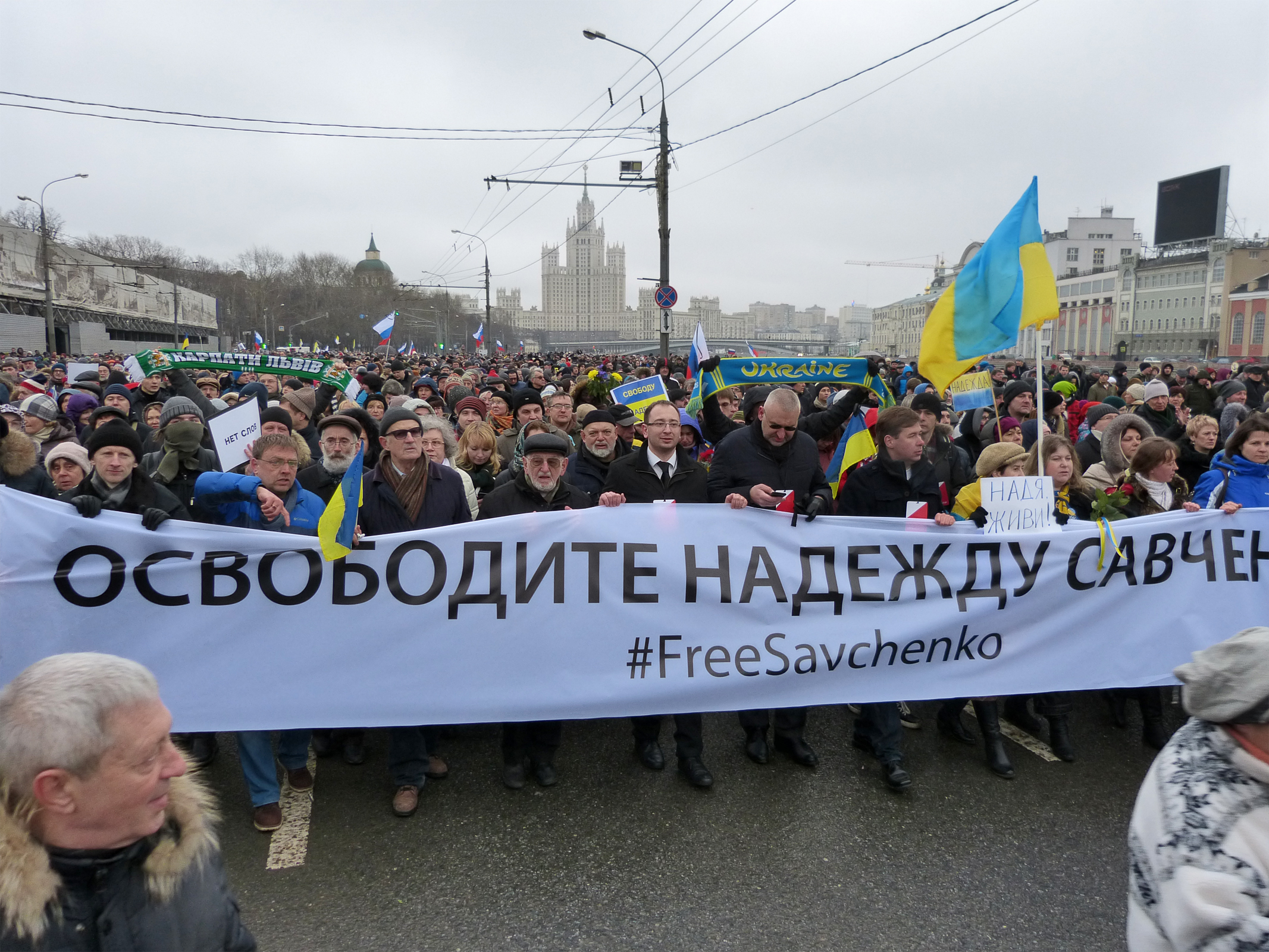
Russian opposition rally in Moscow, March 2015

As of 11 July 2015, Savchenko's Russian defence lawyer was Mark Feygin, who is known for his defence of Pussy Riot. On 27 August 2014, during a hearing at the Sovetsky district court of Voronezh, Savchenko appeared wearing a T-shirt with the Ukrainian state symbol (Tryzub) and spoke exclusively in the Ukrainian language. She also stated that she had been detained in Russia since 24 June, not 30 June as the Russian investigation reported. At the conclusion of the hearing, the court extended Savchenko's detention for a further two months and ordered that she be sent for a month to the Serbsky Institute for a forensic psychological evaluation, which Savchenko opposed.

On 22 December 2014, Moscow City Court upheld the decision to extend the arrest of Savchenko until the end of the investigation, which was scheduled to be concluded by 13 February 2015. Savchenko subsequently began a hunger strike. The European Union and the United States condemned Savchenko's detention and called for her release. Her lawyer, Mark Feygin, said she was a prisoner-of-war.

Savchenko officially became a Ukrainian delegate to the Parliamentary Assembly of the Council of Europe, or PACE, on 26 January 2015; thus on a legal level, she obtained parliamentary immunity in all PACE signatory states, including Russia, from that date. Despite this she was not released. Aleksey Pushkov of the Russian Duma stated that her appointment to PACE was an attack against Russia, and that gaining diplomatic immunity does not absolve one from previous crimes. However, the Russian delegation to PACE struck a different tone, stating that it "fully supports the release of Nadia Savchenko." PACE declined to strip Savchenko of her parliamentary immunity, and instead stated that Savchenko must be immediately released, finding her 2014 abduction and subsequent imprisonment to be "a violation of international law amounting to her de facto kidnapping".

On 2 March 2015, President Petro Poroshenko awarded Savchenko with the title of Hero of Ukraine.

On 24 July 2015, a spokesman for the Investigative Committee of Russia, contrary to the information of Savchenko's capture published earlier by Donetsk People's Republic, stated that she voluntarily crossed the Russian border with intention of committing acts of sabotage and freely moved on the territory of Voronezh Oblast until 30 June when she was arrested.

In February 2016, the US State department's spokesperson Jen Psaki voiced deep concern over the continued ill-treatment and deteriorating health of Savchenko, and called on Russia to honour its commitments under the September 2014 Minsk agreements, and the 15 February implementation plan by immediately releasing Savchenko and other Ukrainian hostages. Other urges to release her followed.

On 7 March 2016, US Secretary of State John Kerry protested Savchenko's continued detention, specifically mentioning concerns about her interrogations, solitary confinement, and forced "psychiatric evaluation".

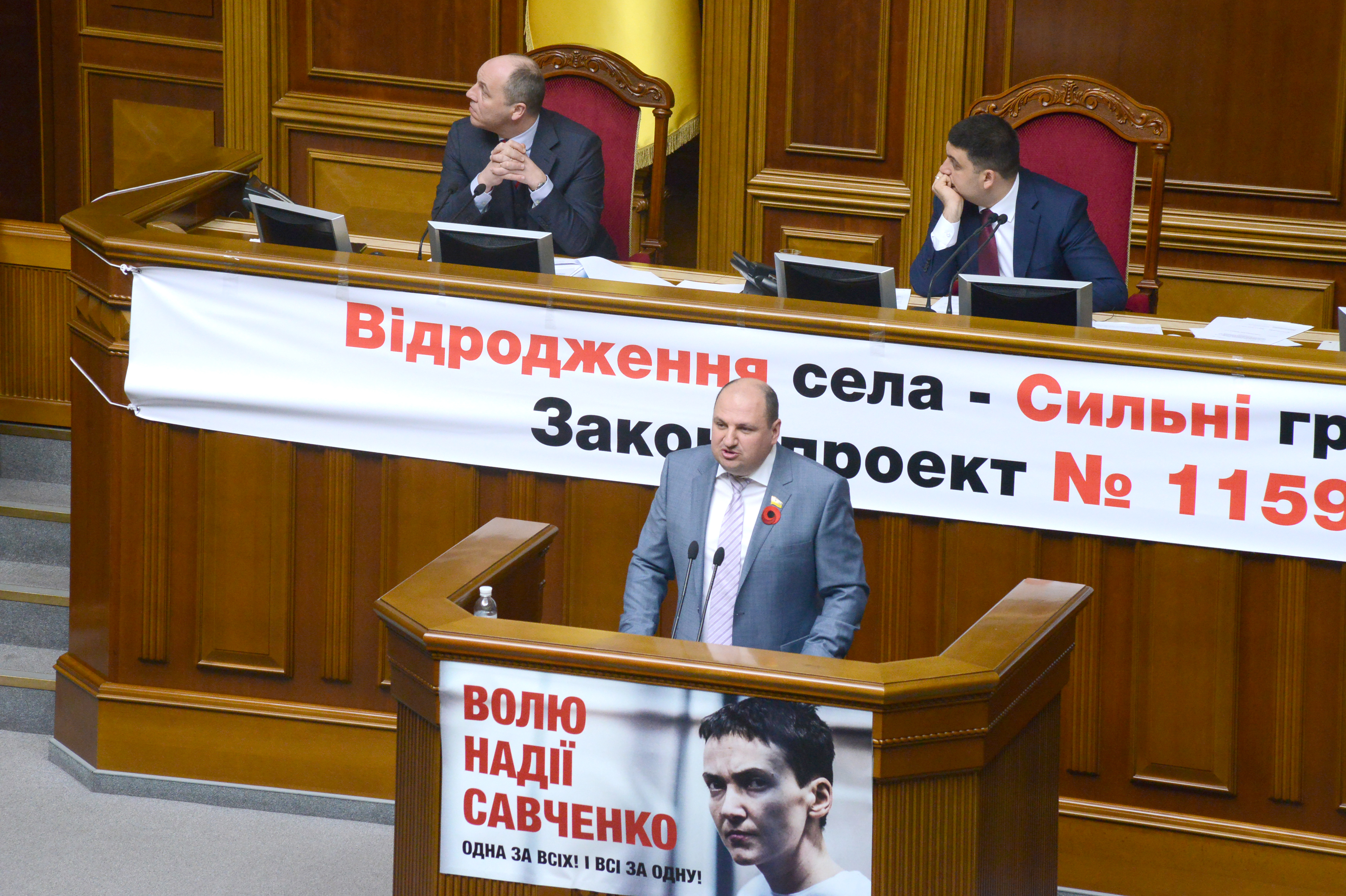
Parliament of Ukraine in April 2015

In March 2016, Savchenko wrote: "It is an absurd situation when those who abduct people and subject them to torture then act as if they have a right to judge them! How can one talk about a fair trial? In Russia, there are no trials or investigations—only a farce played out by Kremlin puppets. [...] those in the world with democratic values ought to learn their history lessons before it's too late and remember that there was a time when Europe was tolerant toward Hitler, and America wasn't decisive enough, and this led to World War II."

On 10 March 2016, while on a hunger strike, Nadiya Savchenko made a last statement to the court, which included the statement: "I admit no guilt and I recognize neither the court nor the verdict. If I am found guilty, I will not appeal. I want the entire democratic world to understand that Russia is a Third World country with a totalitarian regime and a petty tyrant for a dictator and it spits on international law and human rights."

According to her lawyer Mark Feygin, "her case will certainly be decided in Kremlin by Putin and his associates". On 21 March 2016, the court of Donetsk, Russia found Savchenko guilty of illegally crossing the Russian border and the murder of two Russian journalists.

Savchenko was freed in a prisoner swap on 25 May 2016 for two Russian servicemen. She was released from custody in Rostov-on-Don and immediately on a presidential flight brought to Boryspil. Technically, she was granted a pardon by president Vladimir Putin. Immediately in the Boryspil International Airport she was awarded the Golden Star and received an honorary title of Hero of Ukraine.

=== Public image ===
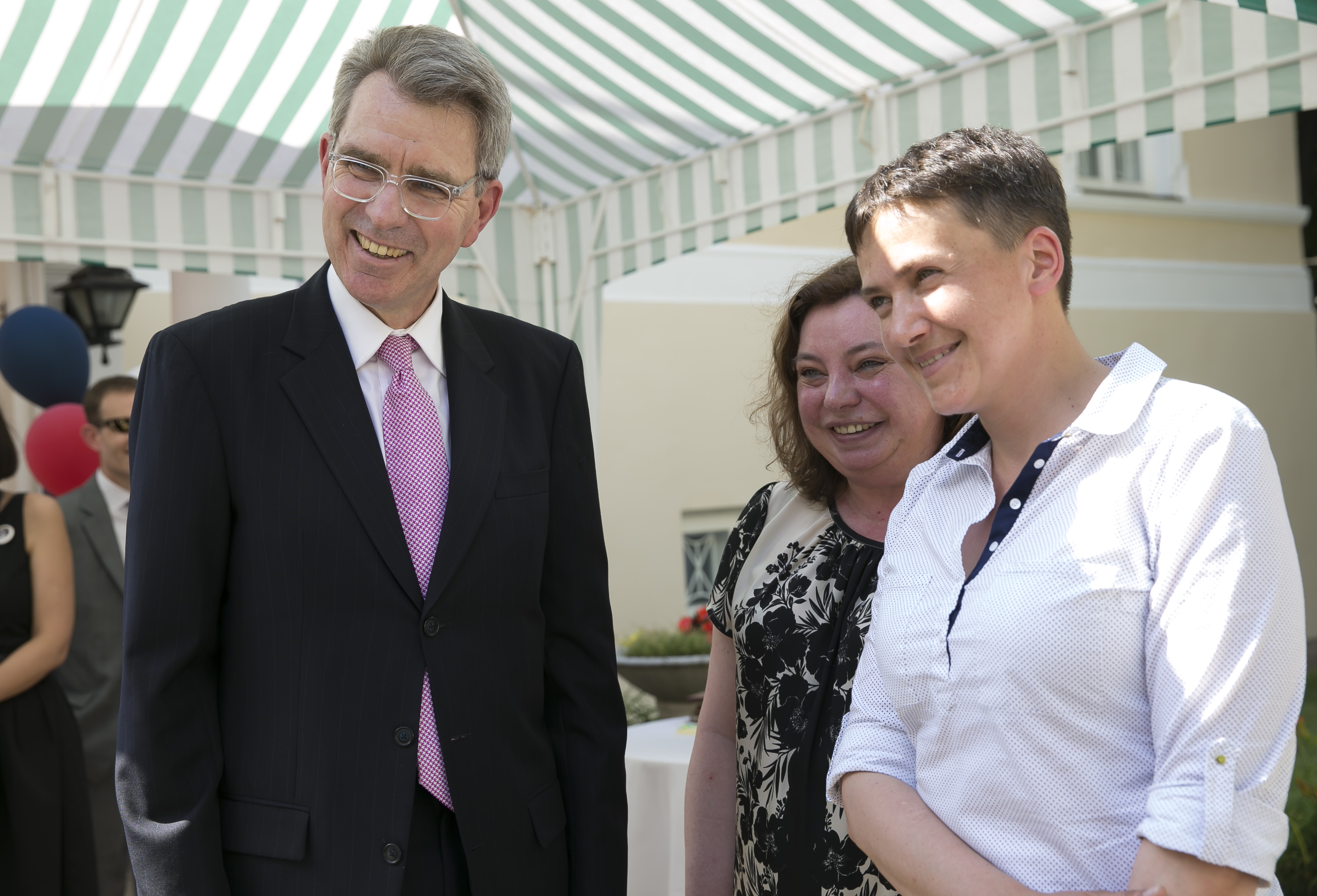
Savchenko at the residence of Geoffrey R. Pyatt, the U.S. Ambassador to Ukraine, 1 July 2016

Savchenko's trial caused a significant response inside Ukraine, Russia and internationally.

After news of her arrest was reported on 19 June, Savchenko became the subject of an impassioned Ukrainian social media campaign portraying her as a national hero. This social media campaign used the hashtag #SaveOurGirl (that mid-July 2014 had generated more than 15,000 tweets); apparently inspired by the hashtag #BringBackOurGirls used in the May 2014 Chibok schoolgirl kidnapping social media worldwide campaign.

According to BBC News, Savchenko is portrayed extremely negatively in the media of Russia: "Crude, and at times sexist, innuendo is used to demonize Ms Savchenko". The Russian daily Komsomolskaya Pravda said that Savchenko is known as a "killing machine in a skirt", and Tvoy Den called her "Satan's daughter". Russian social media, however, tends to be more nuanced towards her with several anti-Kremlin users mocking perceived oddities in the Russian authorities' version of events, in particular their claim that she entered the country as a refugee. In March 2016, Russian composer Vladimir Nazarov wrote in an open letter to Putin saying that "not even in my worst nightmare could I have imagined that I would have to ask you not to kill a woman." In March 2016, Russian opposition politician Alexei Navalny stated about Savchenko's trial, "However you look at it, this doesn't benefit Russia". Navalny said that whoever planned to make Savchenko "a trophy prisoner" had miscalculated. He described the trial as such an "obvious stitch-up" you could "see the threads".

When Savchencko was released from Russian prison in May 2016, opinion polls for the Ukrainian presidential election showed 15% would vote for her; by early 2017, this number was below 5%.

In 2015 the city of Vatutine renamed Lenin Square to Nadiya Savchenko Square. The village of Perekorintsi had a Nadiya Savchenko street, until April 2024, when this street was renamed to Obolon street.

== Political career ==
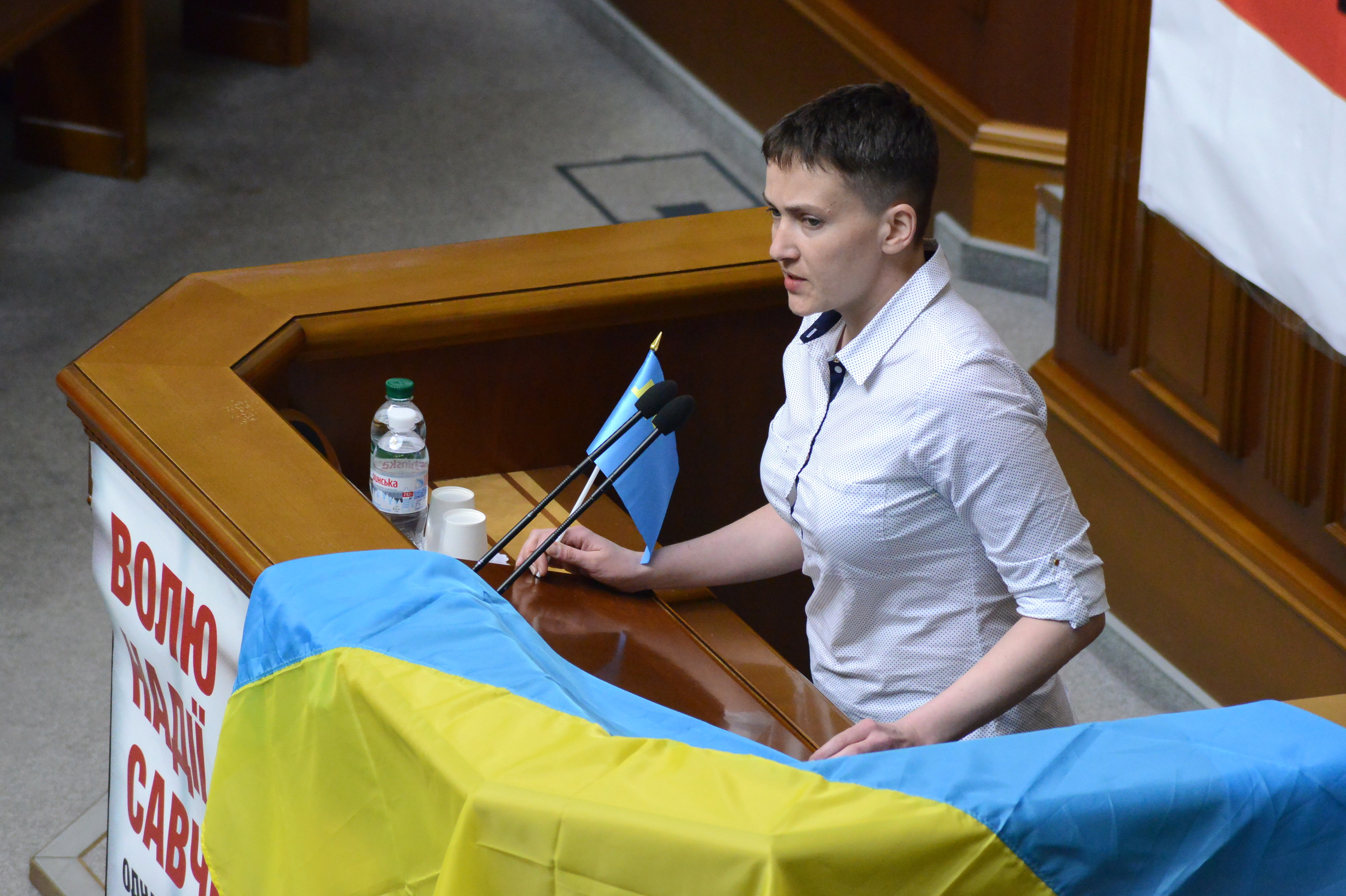
Savchenko in Parliament of Ukraine, 31 May 2016

In the October 2014 Ukrainian parliamentary election, Savchenko was placed first on the party list of Batkivshchyna. (In a June 2016 interview with Radio Free Europe, she stated that the party wasn't her first choice, but it "isn't the worst"). In this same election, her sister Vira Savchenko was also a candidate for Batkivshchyna in an electoral constituency in Yahotyn. Nadiya Savchenko won and was elected as a deputy to the Verkhovna Rada, the parliament of Ukraine. Because of this Savchenko resigned from the Ukrainian army on 7 November 2014. The Russian government recognized the election in Ukraine, meaning that the Russian Federation was holding a member of parliament from another nation under arrest. Vira Savchenko lost, finishing third in her constituency with 7.02% of the votes (winner Serhiy Mishchenko won 40.41%).

In late November 2014, Savchenko signed her parliamentary oath and passed it to Ukraine through her lawyer and was thus sworn in as People's Deputy of Ukraine (MP) on 27 November 2014.

On 25 December 2014, Savchenko was included in Ukraine's quota for representatives in the Parliamentary Assembly of the Council of Europe (PACE); as noted above, legally this granted her parliamentary immunity in all PACE signatory nations, including Russia.

On 6 November 2015, Savchenko's first draft law was introduced to Ukrainian parliament, while she was imprisoned in Russia, and was later passed into legislation.

On 27 May 2016, after returning from Russia in a prisoner exchange, Savchenko said she was prepared to become President of Ukraine if Ukrainians wished.

In 2016, Savchenko left Batkivshchyna, but remained a member of its parliamentary faction. This was announced on 12 December 2016 right after Savchenko had admitted she had recently held a secret meeting with separatist leaders Aleksandr Zakharchenko (of the Donetsk People's Republic) and Igor Plotnitsky (of the Luhansk People's Republic) in Minsk. On 15 December 2016, Batkivshchyna expelled Savchenko from its parliamentary faction in response to her Minsk meeting with Zakharchenko and Plotnitsky. The party saw this meeting as "negotiations with terrorists" and "adamantly opposed" it. (Note: On 16 December 2016 Batkivshchyna declared it would not use the Imperative mandate (depriving her parliamentary seat) against Savchenko. Faction leader Yulia Tymoshenko stated the party did not regret putting Savchenko in its electoral list for the 2014 Ukrainian parliamentary election, because "then we needed to rescue Ukraine's patriot from prison of the occupying country.") Following this controversy, the Ukrainian parliament stripped Savchenko of her PACE membership on 22 December 2016. On 27 December 2016, Savchenko established the Civic Platform RUNA (an acronym for Ukrainian People's Revolution). According to Savchenko RUNA would not be a "political project" but rather a "mechanism" and a "natural association of people" who do not follow "populist slogans." In July 2017, her new political party "Social and Political Platform of Nadiya Savchenko" was officially registered. The same month she stated her intent to take part in the 2019 Ukrainian presidential election.

On 15 March 2018, the Attorney General of Ukraine Yuriy Lutsenko charged Savchenko with preparing a terrorist attack on the Ukrainian parliament. On 22 March 2018, parliament stripped Savchenko of her parliamentary immunity and allowed her arrest. That same day she was arrested on suspicion of planning an assault on the parliament and supporting a coup d'état. Savchenko said she did not plan any terrorist attack, but instead talked with undercover Ukrainian government agent provocateurs who sought to discredit her. She was released from detention on 15 April 2019.

Savchenko took part as a candidate in 2019 Ukrainian presidential elections and 2019 Ukrainian parliamentary elections, but she was not elected.

== See also ==
Other Ukrainians detained by Russia include:

- Oleh Sentsov
- Olexandr Kolchenko
- Stanislav Klykh
- Mykola Karpyuk
- Ahtem Chiygoz

(now all released)
