= Gamer (2011 film) =

- Directed by: Oleg Sentsov
- Written by: Oleg Sentsov
- Produced by: Oleg Sentsov; Olga Zhurzhenko
- Starring: Vladislav Zhuk
- Cinematography: Egor Petrik; Eugene Vradiy; Gennady Veselkov
- Edited by: Dmitry Kundryutsky
- Production company: Cry Cinema
- Release date: 2011
- Running time: 92 minutes
- Country: Ukraine
- Languages: Russian; Ukrainian (dubbed)
- Budget: $20 000
- Box office: $2 696

Gamer (Ukrainian: Гамep), alternatively spelt Gámer or Gaamer, is the debut feature-length film by director Oleg Sentsov. It was released in Russian and Ukrainian in 2011. It tells the story of a young gamer, who lives with his mother in Simferopol. The premiere was held in 2012 in Rotterdam. The film participated in several international film festivals and was a highly marked by the professional community, in particular, a premium Russian Guild of Film Critics at the festival Spirit of Fire in Khanty-Mansiysk.

== Plot ==
The main character in the film is a teenager named Lyosha, an enthusiastic computer games player, spending all his time in special clubs. Following his passion, he pays little attention to others - neither to his mother, distressed by the fact that her son had dropped out of school, nor to his girlfriend Katya, or any of his friends. In an environment of professional gamers Lyosha becomes one of the best, followed by victories in multiple competitions. In an effort to become the best he enters an international tournament in Los Angeles, but takes the second place. After returning home, Lyosha gets rid of his gaming devices, and for the first time in the film, a smile appears on his face.

== Cast ==
- Vladislav Zhuk as Lyosha
- Alexander Fedotov as Bur
- Zhanna Biryuk as mother

== Reception ==
The film was selected to a number of prestigious international film festivals like Rotterdam and São Paulo with some reviewers evoking comparisons with 400 blows and stating that Sentsov "breaks the barrier that separates cinema from real life." Its box office in Ukraine at the time was minimal, but the film is still accumulating revenue via its online distribution by Rotterdam Unleashed, where it can be watched all over the world.

=== Awards and nominations ===
- São Paulo International Film Festival — Best Foreign Film (nom)
- 3 Truskavets International Film Festival — Best Feature Film (2012)
- Lubuskie Film Summer — Prize organizers by Julius Burski (2012)
- Odessa International Film Festival — Prize FIPRESCI, Special Jury Mention (2012)
