= Emir-Usein Kuku =

Ukrainian human rights activist

- Емір-Усеїн Куку
- Born: June 26, 1976 (age 50); Novorossiysk, Russian SFSR, USSR
- Occupation: human rights worker

Emir-Usein Kemalovich Kuku (Ukrainian: Емір-Усеїн Кемалович Куку, Crimean Tatar: Emir-Üsein Kemal oğlu Kuku; born 26 June 1976) is a Crimean Tatar human rights defender and member of the Crimean Human Rights Contact Group. In February 2016, he was arrested and charged by Russian authorities on the accusation that he was a member of the Islamist group Hizb ut-Tahrir, although Kuku denies any involvement in this organization.

== Life ==
Kuku was born in Novorossiysk on 26 June 1976. In 1993, the family moved to Crimea. They obtained a plot of land for the erection of a house in the native village of Kemala Cook in Koreiz.

In 2000, Kuku graduated from Kherson National Technical University with a degree in management. In 2001, he graduated from Kharkiv Financial and Economic Institute majoring in accounting.

Before the annexation of Crimea, Kuku fought for the preservation of a Crimean Tatar cemetery and was involved in monitoring cases of discrimination against Muslims. Since 2014, he participated in helping Crimean political prisoners and in the search for missing people. Kuku was the organizer of a rally in memory of the deportation of Crimean Tatars in 2014.

=== Criminal prosecution and arrest ===
On April 20, 2015, after Kuku exposed the attempt of the FSB to recruit him as a secret informant, he was apprehended by camouflaged assailants and taken to his home, where he was searched and then interrogated by the secret service. It was alleged that investigative actions were conducted within the framework of a criminal case under Art. 282 of the Criminal Code ("Actions aimed at arousing hatred or enmity"). Kuku was beaten on the way to interrogation, and he was later diagnosed with kidney issues in a medical facility.

On February 11, 2016, a search took place at Kuku's house in Koreiz, and he was detained by the Russian authorities. He was charged with alleged involvement in the activities of the Islamist organization Hizb ut-Tahrir although he denies any involvement with this organization. In December 2017 Kuku and five his co-defendants, Muslim Aliyev, Vadim Siruk, Enver Bekirov, Refat Alimov and Arsen Dzhepparov were moved to Rostov-on-Don.

On June 26, 2018, on his birthday, Emir-Usein Kuku began an indefinite hunger strike, during which he lost nine kilograms and declared an ultimatum to Russian President Vladimir Putin:

I, Kuku Emir-Usein Kemalovich, 26.06.1976 year of birth, citizen of Ukraine, Crimean Tatar, Muslim, will declare a hunger strike (refusal to eat) from 06:00 26.06.2018 until the issue of release of political prisoners in Russian prisons, correctional colonies, numbering 70 people. In addition, I demand that the repression of the Crimean Tatars and other believers in Crimea should be stopped.

On November 12, 2019, the Southern District Military Court found Emir-Usein Kuku and five co-defendants guilty of “organizing of the activities of a terrorist organization” and “attempted forcible seizure of power” (Part 2 Article 205.5 and Article 30, Article 278 of Russian Criminal Code). Kuku was sentenced to 12 years in prison.

== International reaction ==
Russian civil rights society Memorial recognized Kuku as political prisoner.

Amnesty International demands the release of Kuku.

Front Line Defenders expressed its concern on the trial and believes that the charges brought against him are based on fabricated evidence.

Human Rights Watch cited the arrest of Kuku as an example of persecution of Crimean Tatars.

According to the Kharkiv Human Rights Protection Group the only evidence that the prosecution has provided is a "pseudo assessment of a recorded conversation “in the kitchen” where the men were discussing the situation in Russia, Ukraine, the fate of Crimea, the place of Islam in both countries and various religious postulates."

In November 2018 the UN General Assembly adopted a resolution which called for the urgent release of Ukrainian citizens Oleg Sentsov, Volodymyr Balukh and Emir-Usein Kuku.

The European Union "expected" Russia to reverse the sentencing of Kuku and his co-defendants and called for their release.

The United States embassy in Kyiv strongly condemned the decision of the Russian court and called for the immediate release of Kuku and his five co-defendants.

On February 11, 2021, the Commissioner for Human Rights Policy and Humanitarian Aid of Germany Bärbel Kofler demanded Kuku's release and called the case symptomatic of the persecution of Crimean Tatars in the illegally occupied Crimea.

== Family ==
Kuku is married and has two children.
