= List of honorary citizens of Paris =

Among the recipients of the honorary citizenship of Paris (French: citoyen d'honneur de Paris) are:

- Íngrid Betancourt - Colombian politician who was kidnapped in 2001.
- Gilad Shalit - Israeli soldier who was kidnapped in 2006 by Palestinian militants and held by Hamas.
- Mumia Abu-Jamal - African-American who was convicted and sentenced to death for the 1981 murder of police officer Daniel Faulkner. Before his arrest he was a Black Panther Party activist and journalist.
- Raoni Metuktire - chief of the Kayapo people, which live in the Amazon rainforest on the territory of Brazil.
- Aung San Suu Kyi - Burmese opposition politician and chairperson of the National League for Democracy (NLD) in Burma.
- Taslima Nasrin - Bangladeshi author and human rights campaigner.
- Charlie Hebdo - French satirical weekly newspaper, whose employees were killed during the Islamist terrorist attack on 7 January 2015.
- Oleg Sentsov - Ukrainian filmmaker who is serving a 20-year prison sentence in Russia since 2015.
- Winston Churchill - British prime minister during WWII (received the honour 12 November 1944)
- Luiz Inácio Lula da Silva - President of Brazil 2003 - 2010, 2023-present.
