= The Trial: The State of Russia vs Oleg Sentsov =

- Directed by: Askold Kurov
- Written by: Mila Andriiash
- Produced by: Maria Gavrilova; Max Tuula; Dariusz Jablonski; Isabela Wojcik; Violetta Kaminska; Alyona Müllerova
- Starring: Oleh Sentsov; Vladimir Putin; Victor Yanukovich
- Cinematography: Askold Kurov
- Edited by: Michal Leszczylowski; Evgeny Zaozernykh
- Music by: Sorin Apostol
- Production companies: Marx Film; Message Film; Czech Television (co-production); Polish Film Institute (support); B2B Doc (support)
- Distributed by: Rise and Shine World Sales
- Release date: February 11, 2017
- Running time: 75 minutes
- Countries: Czech Republic; Estonia; Poland
- Languages: Russian; Ukrainian; English

The Trial: The State of Russia vs Oleg Sentsov (Russian: «Процесс: Российское государство против Олега Сенцова», romanized: Protsess: Rossiyskoye gosudarstvo protiv Olega Sentsova) is a documentary film directed by Askold Kurov. It tells about the case of Ukrainian director Oleg Sentsov, who was detained by Russian special services in Crimea and sentenced to 20 years in prison.

== Production ==
Kurov shot preliminary court sessions and filmed conversations with Sentsov's sister Natalia in Moscow. Ukrainian director Andriy Litvinenko filmed episodes involving Sentsov's friends and AutoMaidan participants in Ukraine. Video interviews were recorded in support of Sentsov with celebrities from around the world. An Indiegogo crowdfunding campaign set a goal of €12,500, but collected commitments of only €1,750. However, a campaign on the Ukrainian platform of the Community Fund raised UAH 45,200.

== Release ==
The world premiere took place on February 11, 2017, at the 67th Berlin International Film Festival, where it was presented in the Berlinale Special section. The Ukrainian premiere took place at the end of March 2017 at the international documentary film festival on human rights Docudays UA.
