= Maksim Ryazantsev =

Russian footballer

Personal information
- Full name: Maksim Nikolayevich Ryazantsev
- Date of birth: 14 March 1977 (age 49)
- Place of birth: Rybinsk, Soviet Union
- Height: 1.75 m (5 ft 9 in)
- Position: Midfielder

Senior career*
Years	Team	Apps	(Gls)
1995	FC Vympel Rybinsk	18	(0)
1996	FC Lokomotiv Yaroslavl	30	(6)
1997	FC Dynamo Vologda	4	(0)
1999–2000	FC Arsenal-2 Tula	73	(3)
2001–2002	FC Oryol	61	(1)
2003	FC Don Novomoskovsk	18	(1)
2003–2010	FC Ural Sverdlovsk Oblast	179	(2)
2011–2012	FC Dynamo Vologda	35	(0)
2013	FC Znamya Truda Orekhovo-Zuyevo	32	(1)
- * Club domestic league appearances and goals

Maksim Nikolayevich Ryazantsev (Russian: Максим Николаевич Рязанцев; born 14 March 1977) is a former Russian professional footballer.

== Club career ==
He made his professional debut in the Russian Third League in 1995 for FC Vympel Rybinsk.

He played 6 seasons in the Russian Football National League for FC Ural Sverdlovsk Oblast.
