= Metalist, Luhansk Raion, Luhansk Oblast =

Coordinates: 48°37′31″N 39°16′30″E

Metalist (Ukrainian: Металіст) is a rural settlement in Luhansk urban hromada, Luhansk Raion, Luhansk Oblast (region), Ukraine. Population 2197 people (2001); the village was incorporated in 1932.

On June 17, 2014, a camera crew of Russian state television came under mortar fire at a checkpoint in the vicinity of Metalist. While sound engineer Anton Voloshin (1987-2014) died on the spot, special correspondent Igor Kornelyuk (1977-2014) was severely wounded dying later in hospital. Cameraman Viktor Denisov survived the attack unharmed.

On June 18, 2014, the Ukrainian female army aviator Nadiya Savchenko was captured near the village of Metalist by rebels of the Donbass People's Militia, an armed pro-Russian militant group that declared allegiance to the self-declared People's Republic of Luhansk. Savchenko was later handed over to Russia, charged and convicted for the killing of two Russian journalists during the 2014 insurgency in Donbass (she was released in a prison swap in May 2016). On July 2, 2014, heavy fighting was reported in and near here.
