= Metallist, Vladimir Oblast =

Metallist Металлист
- Settlement
- Location within Vladimir Oblast Location within Russia
- Coordinates: 56°21′N 39°14′E
- Country: Russia
- Region: Vladimir Oblast
- District: Kolchuginsky District
- Time zone: UTC+3:00

Metallist (Russian: Металлист) is a rural locality (a settlement) and the administrative center of Florishchinskoye Rural Settlement, Kolchuginsky District, Vladimir Oblast, Russia. The population was 474 as of 2010.

== Geography ==
Metallist is located 13 km northwest of Kolchugino (the district's administrative centre) by road. Kozhino is the nearest rural locality.
