= Juleanna Glover =

American political consultant and lobbyist

- Born: September 27, 1969 (age 57)
- Education: Marymount University (BA); George Mason University (MPA); Johns Hopkins University (attended)
- Political party: Republican
- Spouse: Jeffrey Weiss (m. 2009, divorced)
- Children: 4

Juleanna Ruth Glover (born September 27, 1969) is an American corporate public affairs consultant, entrepreneur, former Republican lobbyist, and political strategist. She is founder and CEO of Ridgely Walsh, a public and governmental affairs agency that advises Silicon Valley companies, including Google, Snap, Oracle, eBay, First Solar, Uber, and SpaceX.

As a lobbyist, Glover is widely considered one of the most powerful women in Washington. A former spokesperson for James Murdoch and an advisor to Elon Musk, she was called the "mogul whisperer" by The New York Times.

== Early career ==
Glover received her B.A. from Marymount University in 1991 and M.P.A. from George Mason University in 1993. Glover also studied at Johns Hopkins University’s School of Advanced International Studies in Washington, D.C.

Glover started working for Senator John Ashcroft (R-Missouri) in 1996 when he was a freshman senator and helped him explore a bid for the 2000 presidential election. Ashcroft chose not to run for president, so Glover became press secretary for businessman Steve Forbes, whose campaign ended before the Republican Party convention.

Glover also worked for Bill Kristol, Vice President Dan Quayle, former Senator and Energy Secretary Spence Abraham, and conservative activist Phyllis Schlafly. Glover worked in the Jesse Helms for North Carolina campaign and the Rudolph W. Giuliani U.S. Senate exploratory committee, where she worked in the months following her first child's birth.

Glover also worked as the Publicity Director for The Weekly Standard; and as legislative director for the Project for the Republican Future.

== White House service ==
Ms. Glover served as senior staff for President George W. Bush and as Press Secretary for Vice President Dick Cheney. Glover also served as the registered government affairs advisor for Iraq's first post-Saddam Hussein ambassador to the United States, Samir Sumaidaie. She is a former term member of the Council on Foreign Relations.

After leaving the White House, Glover was a Resident Fellow at Harvard University's Institute of Politics in 2002 and has lectured on the future of the Republican Party at Princeton University's Woodrow Wilson School of Public and International Affairs.

== Never Trump ==
Glover is part of the Never Trump movement who said “And for a conservative woman to be opposed to Trump is the most naturally comfortable place to be, philosophically and morally.”

== Private sector ==
Glover has worked as a public affairs consultant since leaving the White House in 2002. Glover was a Director at Clark & Weinstock, one of the top public and government affairs firms in the country. She then co-founded the Ashcroft Group, LLC along with former U.S. Attorney General, John Ashcroft.

In 2007, Glover was a senior advisor in Senator John McCain's 2008 bid for the White House, traveling with him throughout the primary season.

In 2015 and 2021, Washingtonian magazine listed Glover as one of Washington's most powerful women, as did Elle in 2012. In 2011, The New York Times described Glover as the "consummate political insider", and in 2012, Bloomberg News described in her profile: "[S]he brings Washington power players together in a way others can’t match. If you’re looking for the right introduction in D.C., you need to know Juleanna Glover."

In 2013, Glover was a signatory to an amicus curiae brief submitted to the U.S. Supreme Court in support of same-sex marriage via the Hollingsworth v. Perry case. Also that year, Ms. Glover became Managing Director of Teneo Intelligence. In accordance with Teneo's policy of not engaging in lobbying activity, Glover fully deregistered as a lobbyist prior to joining.

In early 2015, Glover transitioned to a senior advisor at Teneo Holdings and began work at her new firm, The Office of Juleanna Glover, with a full transition in January 2016.

In May 2018, leaked notes written by Paul Manafort indicated that Glover had been mentioned at the June 2016 Trump Tower meeting.

In 2018, she founded Ridgely Walsh, a public affairs firm in DC. The firm is known to advise some of the most important technology companies in the world. After Russia invaded Ukraine in February 2022, it started providing pro bono PR assistance for Ukraine as well. The firm's senior director and Ukrainian national Veronika Velch (V. Kruglashova) worked to connect members of the media with Ukrainian citizens and government officials. "We’re honored to support our longtime Ukrainian colleague in her volunteer work to help her country," Glover told Politico on the matter.

Glover serves on the board of directors for several organizations, including: FREOPP, Take Back Our Republic group to reduce the political influence of big donors, the Climate Leadership Council, and Biden Institute. She also serves on the Membership Committee for The Economic Club of Washington, DC.

Glover is a regular public policy commentator on cable news shows, including Squawk Box on CNBC, Fox & Friends on Fox News, and Martin Bashir on MSNBC. Her opinion pieces have been published in The New York Times, The Wall Street Journal, The Washington Post, Politico, Forbes, and The National Review, among others.

== Relationship with Jeffrey Epstein ==
The Epstein document release of January 2026 reveal a series of email communications between Juleanna Glover and Jeffrey Epstein, primarily from 2017 and 2018, focused on scheduling in-person meetings at Epstein's New York residence and discussing financial strategies involving sovereign funds, private company transactions, and Tesla's operations. This was a decade after Epstein went to jail on child prostitution charges — to share possible presidential tickets “outside the partisan lanes.” Glover stated in Washington Post opinion that her outreach was intended to encourage Epstein to speak with a journalist about what he knew regarding Donald Trump, rather than to pursue a personal or financial relationship.

Glover, operating through her firm Ridgley Walsh, coordinated with Epstein to introduce him to Michael Abramowitz of Freedom House, resulting in a phone call between the two. These proposed meetings with Freedom House were designed to "reintroduce Epstein to parts of mainstream society and made a brief attempt to fashion him into a champion of democracy" according to Politico, but the Epstein emails show she only sought to put him in touch with one other person, James B. Stewart, a New York Times reporter. Stewart wrote an account of Epstein reaching out to him to write his biography shortly after Epstein's death. Glover wrote in the Washington Post that she encouraged Epstein to donate to Freedom House to fund "the pro-democracy movement in Russia then coalescing around the activist Alexei Navalny. This was just days after Trump had fired FBI Director James Comey in retaliation for investigating Russian interference in the 2016."

Additional exchanges involve Glover offering detailed financial analysis on Tesla, including profit margins and Autopilot technology, in the context of potential "going private" deals with sovereign funds.

These interactions, facilitated by Epstein's assistant Lesley Groff and Glover's colleague Damian Lair, appear professional in tone and content, centered on business networking, philanthropy, and investment advice. Analytically, the repeated scheduling efforts and confidential disclaimers suggest Glover acted as a connector in Epstein's post-conviction network, potentially leveraging her political and financial contacts, though no documents reference illicit activities.

== Personal life ==
Glover has four children. Formerly married to Jeffrey Weiss, she was divorced in 2009. Later that year, the Washington Post reported that she was dating Dal LaMagna.

She endorsed Democratic presidential nominee Kamala Harris in the 2024 presidential election.
