= Veronika Sentsov-Velch =

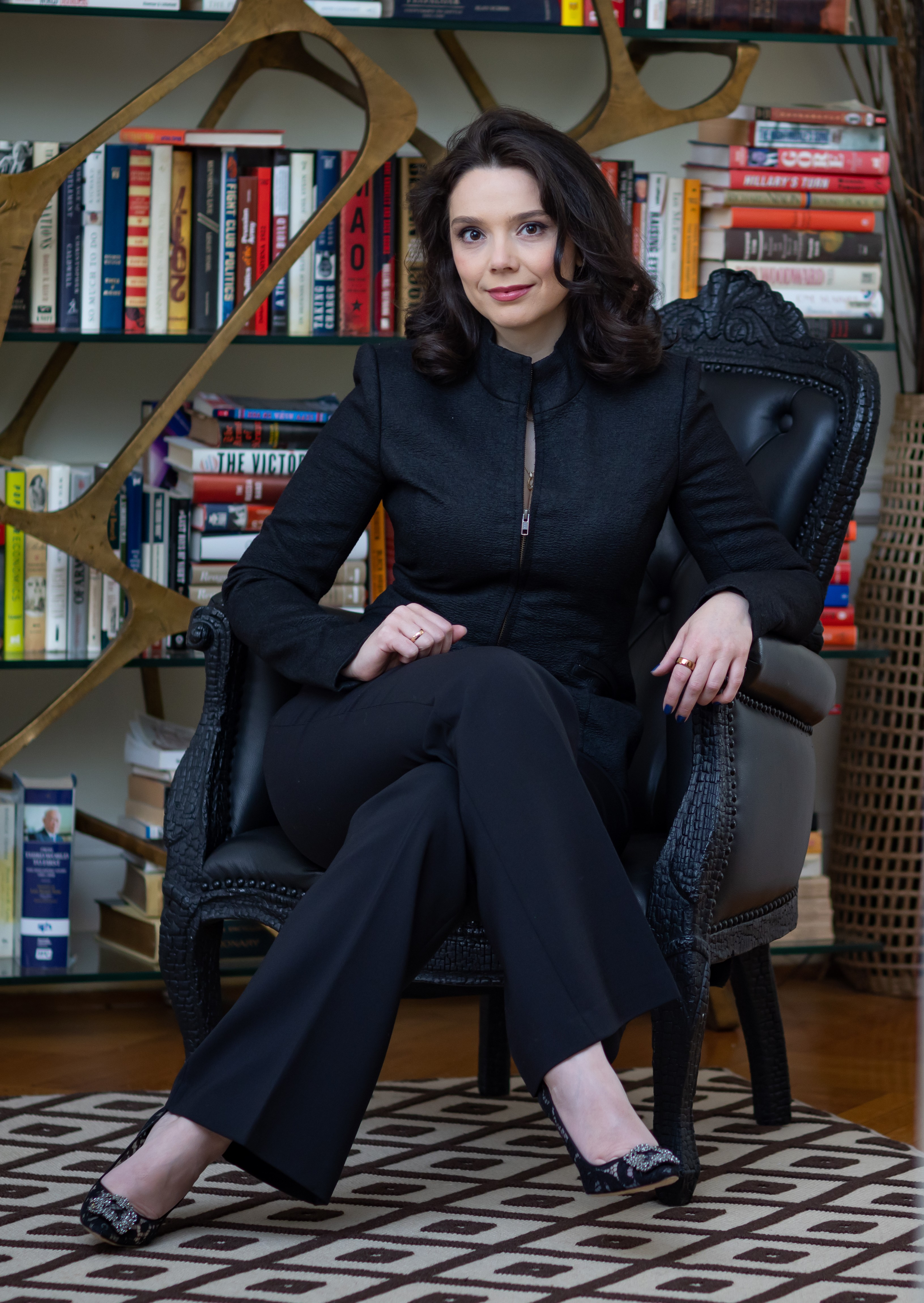
- Born: Veronika Dmytrivna Velch; March 26; Ivano-Frankivsk, Ukraine
- Education: Vasyl Stefanyk Precarpathian National University (BA), Chernivtsi National University, Yuriy Fedkovych Chernivtsi National University (PhD), George Washington University (MA)
- Occupations: Lawyer, civic activist, human rights advocate
- Known for: Executive Director of Amnesty International Ukraine
- Spouse: Oleh Sentsov
- Children: 2 (Lev, Demian)
- Awards: Mark and Debbie Kennedy Frontiers of Freedom Award (2018)

Veronika Sentsov-Velch, PhD (née Velch; born 26 March) is an advocate and a specialist in corporate and crisis communications, as well as international lobbying and a Ukrainian advocate. She holds a PhD in international relations. Since April 2024, Veronika has served as Country Director of Amnesty International Ukraine. She previously worked as Senior Advocacy Director at the U.S. public affairs consulting agency Ridgely Walsh and as co-coordinator of Euromaidan SOS (Ukraine).

Since the beginning of the full-scale war in Ukraine, she has worked in Washington and Kyiv to strengthen support for Ukraine and increase arms supplies. As head of Amnesty International Ukraine, she focuses on documenting war crimes, human-rights education, and the protection of prisoners of war and civilian hostages.

== Biography ==
Sentsov-Velch was born in Ivano-Frankivsk. She graduated with distinction from the Vasyl Stefanyk Precarpathian National University in 2009.

In 2015, she defended her PhD's dissertation “International election observation in the post-Soviet space (Ukraine, Russian Federation, Republic of Belarus)” at the Yuriy Fedkovych Chernivtsi National University.

In 2018, she completed a master's degree in International Advocacy and Strategic Communications at the George Washington University's Graduate School of Political Management.

Her specialization includes advocacy in East Asian and Southern African countries, with a focus on the relationship between technology and human rights.

=== Professional activity ===
She began her career as an expert in Ukrainian election law. In 2013, she worked as a correspondent for the Voice of America Ukrainian Service in Washington.

During the Revolution of Dignity (Euromaidan), she returned to Kyiv and led communications for the Chesno civic movement. In 2015–2016, she helped organize the nationwide “Follow the Money” campaign, promoting transparency in political finances, including work related to the mayoral race in Ivano-Frankivsk.

Since 2018, she has worked in corporate communications and international advocacy with U.S. lobbyist Juleanna Glover at Ridgely Walsh.

After Russia's full-scale invasion of Ukraine in 2022, she orchestrated volunteer advocacy projects in Washington D.C. in support of Ukraine, lobbying for the supplies of F-16s, drones, artillery, and armored vehicles. Between 2019 and 2024, she worked to develop a media strategy and advocacy campaign on behalf of Paul Whelan, a U.S. citizen imprisoned in Russia.

In 2024, she returned to Ukraine and became executive director of Amnesty International Ukraine.

=== Academic and civic activity ===
Sentsov-Velch is a Senior Research Fellow on national security and innovation at the Rainey Center (Washington D.C.). She served as an expert observer in the 2019 Ukrainian presidential election and is a member of the Transatlantic Democracy Working Group.

She also sits on the supervisory board of Samizdat Online, a Canadian digital platform that combats propaganda and promotes access to information under censorship.

In Ukraine, she co-coordinated Euromaidan SOS, documenting human-rights violations during the 2013–2014 protests.

== Awards and recognition ==
- 2018 – Mark and Debbie Kennedy Frontiers of Freedom Award for contributions to democracy and human rights.
- 2020 – Named among Washington D.C.’s “Up-and-coming young leaders” by Washington Life Magazine.

== Family ==
In 2022, she married Oleh Sentsov, a Ukrainian film director and civic activist.

Her first husband, Andriy Kruglashov, is a political consultant and former coordinator of the Chesno movement.

She has two sons: Lev (born 2012) and Demian (born 2022).

== Selected publications ==
- Velch, Veronika (2022). "How is life in Ukraine?". Washington Examiner.
- Velch, Veronika (2021). "TikTok vs Putin: An Unexpected Clash". RealClear Defense.
- Velch, Veronika (2021). "Telegram: A Growing Social Media Refuge, for Good and Ill". Just Security.
- Velch, Veronika; Miskyi, Vadym (2020). "Fighting Russia's Disinformation Pandemic". RealClearWorld.
- Hunt, Sarah; Velch, Veronika (2019). "The Future of Data Privacy?". Protego Press.
