= Olexandr Kolchenko =

Ukrainian anarchist (born 1989)

Oleksandr Kolchenko
- Олександр Кольченко
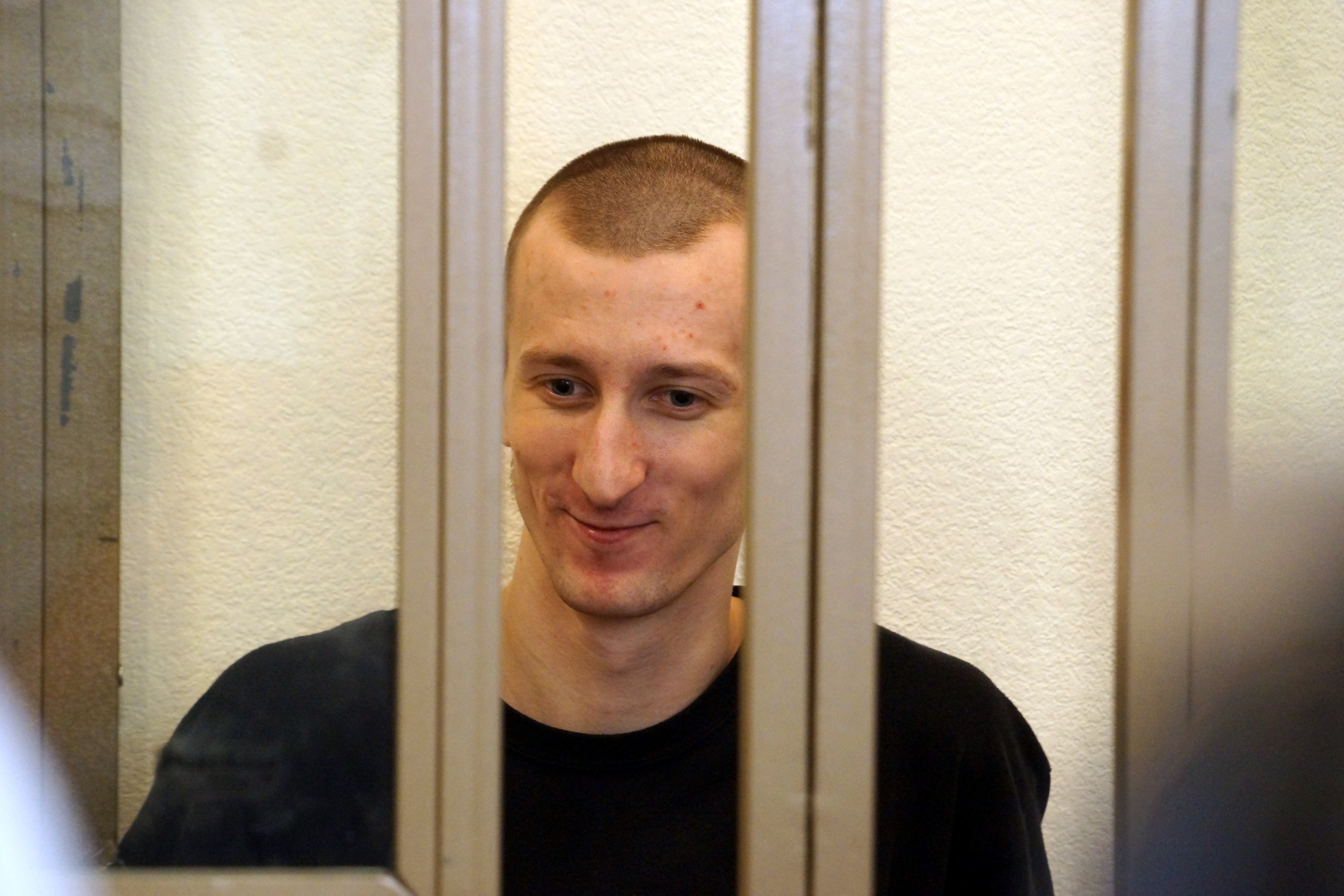
- Born: November 26, 1989 (age 36); Simferopol, Crimean Oblast, Ukrainian SSR, Soviet Union
- Education: Taurida National V.I. Vernadsky University (TNU) (dropped out)
- Known for: Arrest, criminal prosecution by Russian authorities
- Criminal charges: Arson, terrorism
- Criminal penalty: 10 years in prison
- Criminal status: Released from prison in September 2019
- Awards: Order for Courage

Oleksandr Oleksandrovych Kolchenko (Ukrainian: Олександр Олександрович Кольченко, nicknamed "Tundra"; born November 26, 1989) is a Ukrainian left-wing and trade union activist, antifascist, anarchist, ecologist, and archaeologist, who was convicted of terrorism by the Russian administration of Crimea in 2014.

Oleksandr Kolchenko and three more Crimean pro-Ukrainian activists: Oleksiy Cherniy, Hennadiy Afanasyev and Oleh Sentsov are united by a common criminal case of the so-called "Crimean terrorists". All four were arrested and imprisoned in Russia after the annexation of Crimea by the Russian Federation. On 7 September 2019 Kolchenko was released in a prisoner swap.

== Activism ==
Born in a working-class family, Oleksandr Kolchenko worked as a loader at the post while studying tourism management at the geographic faculty of Tavrida National University in Simferopol. He became a supporter of anarchist, antifascist and internationalist ideas. Since 2007, Kolchenko has been an active militant of the local antifascist movement. He staged numerous street protests against manifestations of fascism in the region, and participated in clashes with both Ukrainian and pro-Russian far right. He also organized actions of solidarity with Russian antifascists who fell victims of the neo-Nazi terror or government repression, including Anastasia Baburova and Ivan Khutorskoy.

From 2010 to 2013, Kolchenko was an active member of the independent trade union "Student Action" composed of socialists and anarchists advocating free education, student rights, and autonomy of universities. He was involved to numerous events and public campaigns to protect workers' rights and the environment. He was supporting the struggles of Crimean Trolleybus employees and protesting against construction of a contaminant port in Crimea.

== Arrest and prosecution ==
Oleksandr Kolchenko was detained on May 16, 2014, in Simferopol, Crimea, Ukraine. He was convicted of arson of the offices of Russian political organizations and planning the bombing of the Soviet Memorial monument in Crimea. On May 23, 2014, Oleksandr was convoyed to Moscow and imprisoned in the Lefortovo prison.

Despite his left-wing and antifascist affiliations, he has been accused of belonging to the Ukrainian ultranationalist organization Right Sector and of plotting terrorist attacks.

In June 2015 the investigation of the Kolchenko and Sentsov criminal case was finished and the case went to trial. On July 31, 2015, the Rostov-on-Don military court started hearings on this case. Oleksandr Kolchenko stood trial together with Oleh Sentsov.

The accusation against Kolchenko and Sentsov is primarily based on evidence given by two other so-called "Crimean terrorists", Chyrniy and Afanasyev, broadcast on Russian television. But they refused to testify in court. Afanasyev announced that his testimonies had been given under torture.

== Defence ==
Kolchenko denied the charges of terrorism. He admitted that he had acted as a lookout in the street while a Molotov cocktail was thrown at a building housing pro-Russian organizations – namely United Russia (formerly the Crimean Party of Regions) and the Russian Community of Crimea NGO, but denied that the act constituted terrorism. The attack was committed at night when the participants understood the office to be empty and there was no intention to put anybody's life in danger. According to the human rights organization Memorial, similar attacks on party offices in Russia to this date have been punished as arson or hooliganism and not as terrorism.

Both Kolchenko and his lawyer, Svetlana Sidorkina, are adamant that the only real charge against Kolchenko can be classified as hooliganism or vandalism. Kolchenko also refuted belonging to the political party Right Sector which is banned in Russia. Right Sector itself has released a press statement stating that the four individuals considered by Russia as "Crimean terrorists" have nothing to do with the party.

Russian authorities denied Sentsov and Kolchenko Ukrainian consular assistance, claiming that they were Russian citizens. Following the annexation of Crimea, Kolchenko and Sentsov had not signed the document stating that they did not wish to change citizenship. In turn, the State Migration Service of Ukraine confirmed Kolchenko's Ukrainian citizenship and the Kyiv Prosecutor's Office opened a case regarding the abduction of a Ukrainian citizen Oleksandr Kolchenko.

According to his lawyer, Svetlana Sidorkina, Kolchenko was illegally issued with a Russian passport, dated May 26, 2014, when he was already in detention. Kolchenko has sent a complaint to the European Court of Human Rights against Russian citizenship forcibly having been conferred on him.

== Conviction ==
On August 25, 2015, the board of military judges chaired by the judge Sergey Mikhailyuk sentenced Oleksandr Kolchenko and Oleh Sentsov to 10 and 20 years respectively. When the verdict was pronounced, Kolchenko and Sentsov started to sing the Ukrainian National Anthem.

== Support and reactions ==
The highly politicized trial of Sentsov and Kolchenko has resonated not only in Ukraine but also worldwide. Many prominent world organizations advocating human rights and democratic movement such as OSCE, US Mission to the OSCE, Amnesty International, International Federation of Human Rights, FIDH - Center for Civil Liberties Human Rights in Ukraine, Open Democracy, No Borders Network, European Trade Unions, the European Court of Human Rights, and the Group of Resistance to Political repressions in Russia have condemned political persecution of Kolchenko and called for his release. Kolchenko's name was mentioned in an OSCE PA resolution condemning Russia's continuing actions in Ukraine. These organizations call on Russia to "immediately release and return to Ukraine detained pilot Nadiya Savchenko, filmmaker Oleh Sentsov, Oleksandr Kolchenko and all other illegally detained Ukrainian citizens". The Active Generation: The web activists network, The Committee of Solidarity with the "Crimean hostages" and the International Solidarity Campaign for Oleksandr Kolchenko run an ongoing multinational supporting campaign for the political prisoner. The information about how to support Oleksandr Kolchenko is available in German, Italian, French and Spanish. The social media campaign uses the hashtag #freeKolchenko.

=== Political aspect ===
A number of organizations, including the Commission on Security and Cooperation in Europe, and the Memorial Human Rights Center have recognized Oleksandr Kolchenko as a political prisoner. Amnesty International campaigned for his release. He was open about his opposition to the occupation of Crimea by Russia, prompting a fierce reaction from the Russian authorities. The Ministry of Foreign Affairs of Ukraine urged the Russian Federation to immediately release Oleh Sentsov and Oleksandr Kolchenko. The sentencing of Kolchenko was condemned by the US Department of State and the European Union. Kolchenko's lawyer, Svetlana Sidorkina, compared the verdict to one from the times of Stalin′s Great Terror. She intends to appeal to the Supreme Court of Russia and to the European Court of Human Rights.

=== Awards ===
The President of Ukraine Petro Poroshenko awarded Oleksandr Kolchenko an Order for Courage First Class (Ukrainian: Орден «За мужність») for personal courage and dedication in upholding constitutional rights and freedoms for the integrity of the Ukrainian state on September 24, 2015.

== Release ==
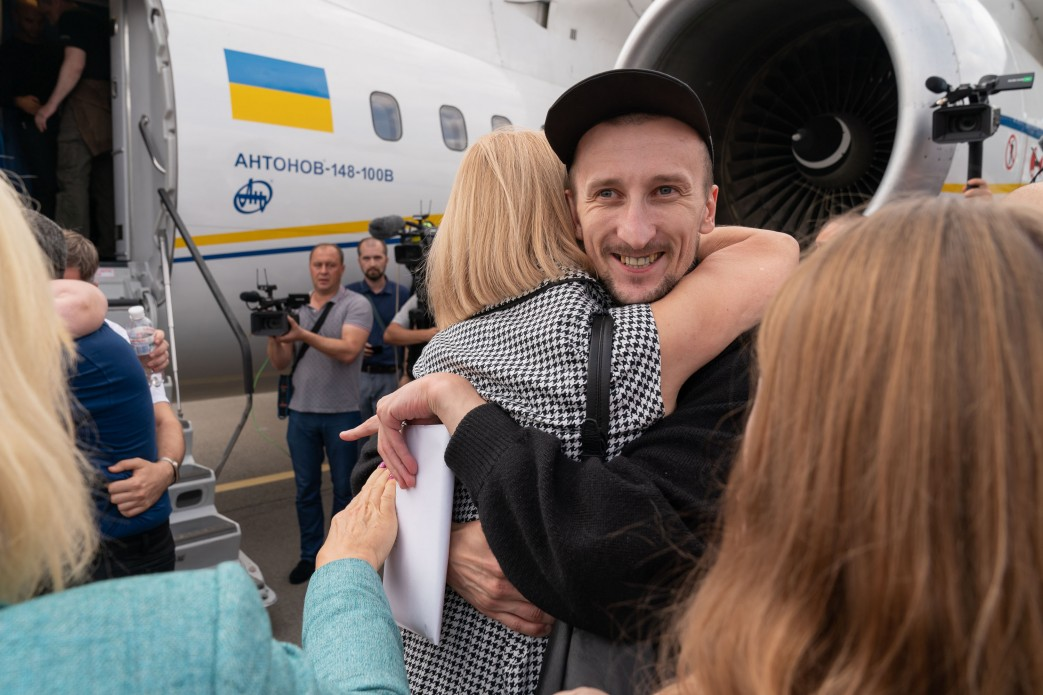
Return of Kolchenko to Ukraine

On 7 September 2019, in a prisoner swap with Ukraine, Russia released Oleksandr Kolchenko and same day he returned to Kyiv where he - and other returning prisoners - was welcomed by Ukrainian President Volodymyr Zelenskyy.

The swap and release of prisoners was welcomed by American, French and German leaders and leaders of international organizations such as NATO, OSCE and regional (European Parliament).

After Russia's full-scale invasion of Ukraine in 2022, Kolchenko had undergone combat training in Kyiv in the spring and then signed a contract with the Armed Forces of Ukraine. He fights in the south of the country. In April he got married.
