= List of military special forces units =

Compilation of world's military special forces

This is a list of military special forces units, also known as special operations forces (SOF), currently active with countries around the world, that are specially organized, trained and equipped to conduct special operations.

These are distinct from special-purpose infantry units, such as the Royal Marine Commandos, found on the list of commando units, and also paratrooper units found on the list of paratrooper forces.

== Definitions ==
NATO currently defines "special operations" as:

Military activities conducted by specially designated, organized, trained, and equipped forces, manned with selected personnel, using unconventional tactics, techniques, and modes of employment.

In 2001, as part of efforts to create a framework for consultation and cooperation between NATO and Russia, the NATO-RUSSIA Glossary of Contemporary Political and Military Terms further defined special operations and special operations forces:

special operations military activities conducted by specially designated, organized, trained and equipped forces using operational techniques and modes of employment not standard to conventional forces. These activities are conducted across the full range of military operations independently or in coordination with operations of conventional forces to achieve political, military, psychological and economic objectives. Politico-military considerations may require clandestine, covert or discreet techniques and the acceptance of a degree of physical and political risk not associated with conventional operations.

special-operations forces strategic formations and units of the armed forces, whose role is to conduct sabotage, reconnaissance, subversive and other special operations on the territory of foreign countries. In wartime they may also be assigned tasks such as intelligence-gathering, the seizure or destruction of key installations, the conduct of psychological operations or the organization of insurgencies in the enemy's rear area. The Armed Forces of the Russian Federation have separate special-operations forces brigades, battalions and companies which are integrated with the intelligence assets of military districts, fronts, fleets, armies or corps.

The United States definition of special operations is:

Operations requiring unique modes of employment, tactical techniques, equipment and training often conducted in hostile, denied, or politically sensitive environments and characterized by one or more of the following: time sensitive, clandestine, low visibility, conducted with and/or through indigenous forces, requiring regional expertise, and/or a high degree of risk.

The Canadian definition of special operations forces is:

Organizations containing specially trained personnel that are organized, equipped and trained to conduct high-risk, high value, special operations to achieve military, political, economic, or international objectives by using special and unique operational methodologies in hostile, denied, or politically sensitive area to achieve desired tactical operational, and/or strategic effects in times of peace, conflict, or war.

== Afghanistan ==
Afghan Army

- Red Unit

Ministry of Interior Affairs

- Badri 313 Battalion

== Albania ==
Albanian Armed Forces

- Special Operations Regiment

== Algeria ==
Algerian People's National Army (PNA)

- 104th Operational Maneuvers Regiment (104th RMO)
- 116th Operational Maneuvers Regiment (116th RMO)

Algerian Navy (ANF)

- Navy Special Action Regiment (RASM)

Republican Guard (GR)

- Special Intervention Regiment (RSI)

== Angola ==
Angolan Armed Forces

- Special Forces Brigade (BRIFE)

== Argentina ==
Argentine Army

- Special Operations Forces Grouping
  - 601 Commando Company
  - 602 Commando Company

Argentine Navy

- Tactical Divers Group
- Amphibious Commandos Group

== Armenia ==
Armenian Army

- 1st Special Forces Regiment (Armenia) – Spetsnaz unit.

== Australia ==
Australian Army

- Special Operations Command
  - Special Forces Group
    - 1st Commando Regiment
    - 2nd Commando Regiment - Incorporates the role of Tactical Assault Group (East)
    - Special Air Service Regiment (SASR) - Incorporates the role of Tactical Assault Group (West)
    - Special Operations Engineer Regiment
- 6th Aviation Regiment
  - 171st Special Operations Aviation Squadron
  - 173rd Special Operations Aviation Squadron

Royal Australian Air Force

- No. 4 Squadron, B Flight

Royal Australian Navy

- Clearance Diving Branch (Note: The Clearance Diving Branch does not have a dedicated special operations role as they also include clearance diving roles.)
  Divers serve with 2nd Commando Regiment as part of Tactical Assault Group (East)

== Austria ==
Austrian Army

- Jagdkommando

== Azerbaijan ==
Azerbaijani Armed Forces

- Special Forces of Azerbaijan
- 641st Naval Special Operations Brigade
- 777th Special Forces Regiment

== Bangladesh ==
Bangladesh Army

- Para Commando Brigade

Bangladesh Navy

- Special Warfare Diving and Salvage (SWADS)

Bangladesh Air Force

- 41 Squadron Airborne

== Belarus ==
Special Operations Forces Command

- 5th Spetsnaz Brigade
- 38th Guards Mobile Brigade – Brest
- 103rd Guards Mobile Brigade – Vitebsk

== Belgium ==
Belgian Army

- Special Operations Regiment in Heverlee

== Botswana ==
- Botswana Ground Force
  - 1st Commando Regiment

== Brazil ==
Brazilian Army

- Special Operations Command
  - 1st Special Forces Battalion (1º BFEsp)
  - 1st Commando Battalion (1º BAC)
  - Special Operation Support Battalion

Brazilian Air Force

- Airborne Rescue Squadron

Brazilian Navy

- Marine Corps Special Operations Battalion (COMANF)
- Combat Divers Groupment (GRUMEC)

== Brunei ==
- Royal Brunei Land Force
  - Special Forces Regiment (SFR)

== Bulgaria ==
- 68th Special Forces Brigade
- Bulgarian Land Forces
  - 101st Alpine Regiment
- Bulgarian Navy
  - 65th Seaborne Special Reconnaissance Detachment

== Burundi ==
- Burundi National Defence Force
  - 4th Commando Battalion

== Cambodia ==
- Royal Cambodian Army
  - Special Forces Command (Cambodia)
  - Brigade 70 (B-70)

== Canada ==
Special Operations Forces Command

- Joint Task Force 2 (JTF2)
- Canadian Special Operations Regiment (CSOR)
- 427 Special Operations Aviation Squadron (427 SOAS)
- Canadian Joint Incident Response Unit (CJIRU)

== Chile ==
- Chilean Army
  - Lautaro Special Operations Brigade
- Chilean Air Force
  - Special Forces Group (Grupo de Fuerzas Especiales, GRUFE)
    - Anti-Aircraft Artillery and Special Forces Regiment "Tactical School" (Regimiento de Artillería Antiaérea y Fuerzas Especiales “Escuela Táctica”)
  - Anti Aircraft Hijacking Group (Agrupación Antisecuestros Aéreos, A.S.A.)

== China – PRC ==
- People's Liberation Army Special Operations Forces
  - People's Liberation Army Ground Force
    - 71st Special Forces Brigade
    - 75th Special Forces Brigade
  - People's Liberation Army Navy
    - People's Liberation Army Navy Marine Corps
      - 7th Marine Brigade (PLA Navy Marine Corps)
  - People's Liberation Army Air Force
    - People's Liberation Army Air Force Airborne Corps
      - Airborne Corps Special Forces Brigade

== Colombia ==
- National Army of Colombia
  - Special Forces Division (División de fuerzas especiales [DIVFE])
- Colombian Aerospace Force
  - Special Air Commando Group (ECOEA)
- Colombian Armada (Navy)
  - Special Operations Division
- Joint units under CCOES
  - Agrupación de Fuerzas Especiales Antiterroristas Urbanas
  - ARES

== Croatia ==
Croatian Special Operations Forces Command

== Cuba ==
- Black Wasp (Avispas Negras)

== Cyprus ==
Special forces

- Special Forces Command (Cyprus)
- Underwater Demolition Team (Cyprus)

== Czech Republic ==
Czech Armed Forces

- Czech Republic Special Operations Forces
  - Ministry of Defence SOF Directorate
  - 601st Special Forces Group

Czech Air Force

- Special Operations Air Detachment

Czech Land Forces

  - 102nd Reconnaissance Battalion

== Democratic Republic of the Congo ==
Land Forces of the Democratic Republic of the Congo

- 31st Rapid Response Unit Brigade
- 391st Commando Battalion

== Denmark ==
Special Operations Command (SOKOM)

- Jaeger Corps (former Royal Danish Army)
- Frogman Corps (former Royal Danish Navy)

Danish Home Guard

- Special Support and Reconnaissance Company

== Ecuador ==
Ecuadorian Army

- IWIAS Jungle Commandos

== El Salvador ==
Special Operations Command (CFE)

- Comando Especial Anti-Terrorista

== Egypt ==
Sa'ka Forces (Thunderbolt Forces)

- Unit 777
- Unit 999

== Estonia ==
Estonian Special Operations Force (ESTSOF)

== Ethiopia ==
- Agazi Commando Division

== Finland ==
Finnish Army

- Utti Jaeger Regiment

Finnish Navy

- Coastal Brigade
  - Naval Reconnaissance Battalion
    - Special Operations Detachment
- Nyland Brigade
  - Coastal Jaegers

== France ==
Special Operations Command (French Army)

- 1st Marine Infantry Parachute Regiment
- 13th Parachute Dragoon Regiment
- 4th Special Forces Helicopter Regiment
- Special Forces Command and Signal Company (Compagnie de Commandement et de Transmissions des Forces Spéciales - CCTFS)

French Navy

- FORFUSCO
  - Commandos Marine

French Air and Space Force

- Air Parachute Commando No. 10 (CPA 10)
- Special Operations Division, Transport section (ET 03/61 Poitou)

Directorate General for External Security

- Action Division

== Georgia ==
Defense Forces

- GSOF

== Germany ==
- German Army
  - Special Forces Command (KSK)
- German Navy
  - Naval Special Forces Command (KSM)
- German Air Force
  - No. 4 Squadron Helicopter Wing 64

== Ghana ==
Ghana Armed Forces

- Ghana Navy
  - Special Boat Squadron

== Greece ==
Hellenic Army

- 1st Raider/Paratrooper Brigade (LOK) (MAK)
- 32nd Marines Brigade

Hellenic Air Force

- 31st Search & Rescue Squadron (31MEED)

Hellenic Navy

- Underwater Demolition Command (DYK) – is organized into sections called Underwater Demolition Teams (OYK)

== Guatemala ==
Armed Forces of Guatemala

- Kaibiles

== Hungary ==
- 1st Special Forces Brigade "Arpad Bertalan"
  - 34th Special Forces Battalion "Bercsényi László"
  - 88th Light Mixed Battalion

== India ==
Armed Forces Special Operations Division

- Indian Army
  - Para (Special Forces)
- Indian Navy
  - MARCOS
- Indian Air Force
  - Garud Commando Force

== Indonesia ==
Special Operations Command

Indonesian Army

- Kopassus – Army special force command
- Tontaipur – Army combat reconnaissance platoon

Indonesian Navy

- Kopaska – Naval frogman commando
- Denjaka – Joint navy-marine special forces
- Taifib – Marine amphibious reconnaissance regiments

Indonesian Air Force

- Korpasgat – Air force special forces command
  - Bravo Detachment 90 – counterterrorism unit of Korpasgat

== Iran ==
Islamic Republic of Iran Army

- 65th Airborne Special Forces Brigade

Islamic Revolutionary Guard Corps

- Quds Force
- Saberin Takavor Brigade
- 110th Salman Farsi Special Operations Brigade
- Sepah Navy Special Force

== Iraq ==
- Counter Terrorism Command (CTC)
  - Iraqi Special Operations Forces

== Ireland ==
Irish Army

- Army Ranger Wing (ARW)

== Israel ==
Military Intelligence Directorate

- General Staff Reconnaissance Unit 269 – Sayeret Matkal

Israeli Army

- Unit 888 – Multidimensional Unit
- Pereh
- Unit 707 – LOTAR
- LOTAR Eilat
- Alpinist Unit
- 89th "Oz" Brigade
  - Unit 212 – Maglan
  - Unit 217 – Duvdevan
  - Unit 621 – Egoz
- Israeli Combat Engineering Corps
  - Yahalom

Israeli Navy

- 13th Flotilla – Shayetet 13

Israeli Air and Space Force

- 7th Special Air Forces Wing (He)
  - Unit 5101 – Shaldag (Special Air-Ground Designating Team)
  - Unit 669 – Combat Search and Rescue and Airborne Medical Evacuation Unit
  - Unit 5700 – Forward Air Field Tactical Unit
  - Koral unit – A highly secretive unit. The unit's fighters are also called "Kodkod fighters."

== Italy ==
Italian Army

- Army Special Forces Command (Italy)
  - 9th Parachute Assault Regiment "Col Moschin"
  - 185th Paratroopers Reconnaissance Target Acquisition Regiment "Folgore"
  - 4th Alpini Parachutist Regiment
  - 3rd Special Operations Helicopter Regiment

Italian Navy

- Comando Subacquei ed Incursori (COMSUBIN)

Italian Air Force

- 17º Stormo Incursori (ex R.I.A.M., CCT)

== Japan ==
Japan Ground Self-Defense Force

- Special Forces Group (Note: The Japanese Special Forces Group is the current name of the former Japanese Special Operations Group, following a name change.)

Japan Maritime Self-Defense Force

- Special Boarding Unit

== Jamaica ==
Jamaica Defence Force

- Special Activities Regiment
- Counter Terrorism Operations Group (CTOG)

== Jordan ==
Joint Special Operations Command

- Special Forces Group – "King Abdulah II"
  - Special Unit I – Specializing in counter terrorism on the basis of the 71st Special Battalion

== Kenya ==
Kenya Special Forces

- Special Operations Regiment (SOR)
- Kenya Navy#Special Operations Squadron

== Kuwait ==
Kuwait Land Forces

- Kuwait 25th Commando Brigade

== Kyrgyzstan ==
Armed Forces of the Kyrgyz Republic

- 25th Special Force Brigade Scorpion

== Latvia ==
Latvian National Armed Forces

- Latvian Special Tasks Unit (SUV)

== Lebanon ==
Special Operations Command

- Lebanese Armed Forces
  - Counter-Sabotage Regiment (aka Moukafaha)
- Lebanese Army
  - Lebanese Commando Regiment (aka "Ranger Regiment")
- Lebanese Navy
  - Marine Commandos
- Lebanese Air Force
  - Airborne Regiment

== Lithuania ==
Lithuanian Special Operations Force

Lithuanian National Defence Volunteer Forces

- Special Operations Platoon (SOB)

== Libya ==
Libyan National Army (LNA)

- Al-Saiqa

== Malaysia ==
Malaysian Army

- 21st Special Service Group / 21 Grup Gerak Khas (GGK)

Royal Malaysian Navy

- Naval Special Warfare Forces / Pasukan Khas Laut (PASKAL)

Royal Malaysian Air Force

- Pasukan Khas TUDM / RMAF Special Force (PASKAU)

== Maldives ==
- Maldives National Defence Force
  - Special Force

== Malta ==
- Armed Forces of Malta
  - Special Operations Unit (SOU)

== Mexico ==
Secretariat of National Defense (SEDENA)

- Joint Special Operations Command (FEC)

Mexican Army

- Special Forces Corps
  - 1st Special Forces Battalion
  - 2nd Special Forces Battalion
  - 3rd Special Forces Battalion
  - 4th Special Forces Battalion
  - 5th Special Forces Battalion
  - 6th Special Forces Battalion

Mexican Navy

- Special Forces (FES)

== Mongolia ==
- 084th Special Task Battalion

== Montenegro ==
- Special Forces Company

== Myanmar ==
- Myanmar Army Special Operations Task Force
- Myanmar Navy Special Operations Task Force

== Namibia ==
Namibian Special Forces

== Netherlands ==
Netherlands Special Operations Command (NLD SOCOM)

- Korps Commandotroepen (KCT)
- Netherlands Maritime Special Operations Forces (NLMARSOF)
  - M-Squadron

== New Zealand ==
Special Operations Component Command

- 1st New Zealand Special Air Service Regiment

== Nigeria ==
Armed Forces Special Forces (AFSF)

- Nigerian Defence Headquarters
  - DHQSOF
- Nigerian Army Special Operations Command (NASOC)
  - 72nd Special Forces Battalion
- Nigerian Air Force Special Operations Command (NAFSOC)
  - NAF Regiment Special Forces (Panthers)
- NN Special Operations Command (NNSOC)
  - Special Boat Service
  - Deep Blue Special Intervention Forces (Maritime Security Unit)

== North Korea – DPRK ==
- Korean People's Army Special Operation Force
- 11th Army Corps ("Storm Corps")

== North Macedonia ==
Army of the Republic of Macedonia

- Special Operations Regiment ("Wolves")

== Norway ==
Armed Forces' Special Command

- Special Operations Command (FSK)
- Navy Special Operation Command (MJK)
- 339 Special Operations Aviation Squadron

Royal Norwegian Navy

- Coastal Ranger Command (KJK)

== Oman ==
- Sultan's Special Force

== Pakistan ==
- Pakistan Army
  - Special Service Group (SSG)
  - Light Commando Battalion (LCB)
- Pakistan Navy
  - Special Service Group Navy (SSGN)
- Pakistan Air Force
  - Special Service Wing (SSW)
- Inter-Services Intelligence
  - Covert Action Division (CAD)

== Papua New Guinea ==
- Land Element
  - Long Range Reconnaissance Unit (LRRU)

== Paraguay ==
Paraguayan Armed Force

- Special Forces Battalion – (Batallón Conjunto de Fuerzas Especiales)

== Philippines ==
Special Operations Command (Philippines)

- Philippine Air Force
  - 710th Special Operations Wing (SPOW)
- Philippine Army
  - 1st Scout Ranger Regiment (SRR)
  - Special Forces Regiment (Airborne) (SFR-A)
  - Light Reaction Regiment (LRR)
- Philippine Navy
  - Naval Special Operations Command (NAVSOCOM)
- Philippine Marine Corps
  - Force Reconnaissance Group
- Philippine Coast Guard
  - Special Operations Force (SOF)

== Poland ==
Special Troops Command

- Operational-Maneuver Response Group (GROM)
- Army Commandos
- JW AGAT
- JW Formoza
- Nil Military Unit
- Special Operations Aviation Unit, commanded by Headquarters Special Troops Command, but part of Polish Air Force

== Portugal ==
Portuguese Army

- Commando Regiment
- Paratroopers
  - Pathfinders Company
- Special Operations Force

Portuguese Navy

- Portuguese Marine Corps
  - Special Actions Detachment (DAE)
- Sappers Divers Group

== Romania ==
Ministry of Defense

- General Directorate for Defense Intelligence (DGIA)
  - Special Detachment of Protection and Intervention
- Romanian Armed Forces:
  - Romanian Special Operations Forces Command
- Romanian Air Force
  - Combat Search and Rescue Detachment (DCSL)

== Rwanda ==
Rwanda Defence Force

- Special Forces Brigade

== Russia ==
Special Operations Forces Command

- Special Purpose Center "Senezh"
- Special Purpose Center "Kubinka-2"
- 344th Army Aviation Combat Center
- Russian Airborne Troops
  - 45th Guards Special Purpose Brigade
- Russian Navy
  - Naval Special Reconnaissance (OMRP) – Reconnaissance divers under operational subordination to the Main Intelligence Directorate (GRU)
  - Counteraction Underwater Diversionary Forces and Facilities (PDSS)

Special Forces of the Main Directorate of the General Staff of the Russian Armed Forces (Special Forces of the GRU)

== Saudi Arabia ==
Royal Saudi Navy

- Special Navy Security Units (SNSU)

Saudi Arabian Army

- 64th Special Forces Brigade

== Serbia ==
- 72nd Brigade for Special Operations
- 63rd Parachute Brigade

== Seychelles ==
Seychelles People's Defence Force

- Tazar Special Forces Unit

== Singapore ==
Special Operations Task Force

- Naval Diving Unit
- Singapore Armed Forces Commando Formation
- Special Operations Force

== Slovakia ==
Slovak Armed Forces

- 5th Special Forces Regiment (Slovakia)

== Slovenia ==
- Posebna Enota za Specialno Taktiko (PEST)
- Enota za Specialno Delovanje (ESD)

== Somalia ==
- Danab Brigade

== South Africa ==
South African National Defence Force

- Special Forces Brigade

== South Korea – ROK ==
Republic of Korea Army

- ROK Army Special Warfare Command ("Black Berets")
  - 1st Special Forces Brigade (Airborne)
  - 3rd Special Forces Brigade (Airborne)
  - 7th Special Forces Brigade (Airborne)
  - 9th Special Forces Brigade (Airborne)
  - 11th Special Forces Brigade (Airborne)
  - 13th Special Mission Brigade
  - 707th Special Mission Group

Republic of Korea Navy

- ROK Naval Special Warfare Flotilla

Republic of Korea Marine Corps

- Marine Special Reconnaissance Brigade
  - 1st Reconnaissance Battalion (attached to 1st Marine Division)
  - 2nd Reconnaissance Battalion (attached to 2nd Marine Division)
  - 3rd Reconnaissance Battalion (attached to HQ command)
- Spartan 3000

Republic of Korea Air Force

- ROK Air Force Combat Control Team (CCT)
- 6th Search and Rescue Squadron (SART)

== Spain ==
- Mando Conjunto de Operaciones Especiales (MCOE, Joint Special Operations Command)
  - Spanish Land Army
    - Mando de Operaciones Especiales (MOE, Special Operations Command)
      - Manages four Special Operations Groups (Grupo de Operaciones Especiales, GOE)
  - Spanish Navy
    - Special Naval Warfare Command
      - Fuerza de Guerra Naval Especial (FGNE, Special Naval Warfare Force) – formerly Unidad de Operaciones Especiales (UOE, Special Operations Unit), until a 2009 merger with Unidad Especial de Buzos de Combate (UEBC, Special Combat Diver Unit) to form the FGNE.
  - Spanish Air and Space Force
    - Escuadrón de Zapadores Paracaidistas (EZAPAC, Paratrooper Sappers Squadron).

== Sri Lanka ==
Sri Lanka Army

- Special Forces Regiment
  - 1st Special Forces Regiment (1 SF)
  - 2nd Special Forces Regiment (2 SF)
  - 3rd Special Forces Regiment (3 SF)
  - 4th Special Forces Regiment (4 SF)
- Commando Regiment

Sri Lanka Navy

- Special Boat Squadron

Sri Lanka Air Force

- Special Airborne Force

== Sweden ==
Swedish Armed Forces

- Special Operations Task Group (SOG)

Swedish Army

- Life Regiment Hussars (K 3)
  - 31st Ranger Battalion
  - 32nd Intelligence Battalion
    - 323rd Parachute Ranger Squadron (Fallskärmsjägarna)
- Norrland Dragoon Regiment (K 4)
  - 41st Ranger Battalion (Arctic)
  - 42nd Ranger Battalion (Arctic)

Swedish Air Force

- Blekinge Wing (F 17)
  - Air Force Rangers (Flygbasjägarna)

Swedish Navy

- Amphibious Corps
  - 1st Marine Regiment (Amf 1)
    - 202nd Coastal Ranger Company (Kustjägarna)

== Switzerland ==
Special Forces Command (KSK)

- Army Reconnaissance Detachment (ARD 10)
- Parachute Reconnaissance Company 17 (FSK-17)

== Taiwan – ROC ==
Republic of China Army

- 101st Amphibious Reconnaissance Battalion
- Airborne Special Service Company

Republic of China Marine Corps

- Amphibious Reconnaissance and Patrol Unit

Republic of China Military Police

- Republic of China Military Police Special Services Company

Coast Guard Administration

- Special Task Unit

== Tanzania ==
Tanzania People's Defence Force

- 93rd Special Forces Battalion
- Marine Special Forces (MSF)

== Thailand ==
Royal Thai Army

- Royal Thai Army Special Warfare Command (RTASWC)
  - 1st Special Forces Division (1st SFD)
    - 3rd Special Forces Regiment
      - Ranger Battalion
      - Task Force 90

Royal Thai Navy

- Naval Special Warfare Command (Royal Thai Navy SEALs)
- RTMC Reconnaissance Battalion

Royal Thai Air Force

- RTAF Security Force Command
  - Special Operations Regiment (SOR)

== Timor-Leste ==
Timor Leste Defence Force

- Unidade Falintil

== Trinidad and Tobago ==
Trinidad and Tobago Coast Guard

- Special Naval Unit (SNU)

== Tunisia ==
Tunisian Army

- Special Forces Group (GFS)
  - Military Intervention Group (GIM)

Tunisian Air Force

- Special Air Regiment (RAS)

Tunisian Navy

- 51st Marine Commando Regiment (51st RCM)
- 52nd Marine Commando Regiment (52nd RCM)

== Turkey ==
Turkish Armed Forces

- General Staff of the Turkish Armed Forces
  - Special Forces Command (OKK) (aka Maroon Berets)
- Turkish Naval Forces
  - Underwater Defence Group (SAS)
  - Underwater Offence Group (SAT)
- Turkish Air Force
  - Combat Search and Rescue (MAK)
  - Air Force Search and Rescue (AKIP)

Northern Cyprus

- TRNC Special Task Force Command (ÖGKK)

== Uganda ==
- Ugandan Special Forces Command (SFC)

== Ukraine ==
Special Operations Forces – headquarters in Kyiv

- Special Operations Center "East" (Kropyvnytskyi)
- Special Operations Center "West" (Khmelnytskyi)
- 140th Special Purpose Center (Khmelnytskyi)
- Ranger Corps of KSSO
  - 4th Spetsnaz Regiment (Ranger)
  - 5th Spetsnaz Regiment (Ranger)
  - 6th Spetsnaz Regiment (Ranger)
  - 7th Spetsnaz Regiment (Ranger)
- Information Warfare & Psychological Operations
  - 16th Center of Information and Psychological Warfare (A1182)
  - 72nd Center of Information and Psychological Warfare (А4398)
  - 74th Center of Information and Psychological Warfare (A1277)
  - 83rd Center of Information and Psychological Warfare (A2455)

Ukrainian Navy units

- 73rd Naval Special Purpose Center (73 MTSSN) (Ochakiv)
- 801st Combat Divers Center (801 OZB) (Ochakiv)

National Guard of Ukraine

- Special Operations Center "Omega"
- Special UAV operations Unit "Typhoon"

Chief Directorate of Intelligence

- Direct Action Unit "Kraken"
- 10th Spetsnaz Battalion "Shaman"
- Special Purpose USV Unit "Group 13"
- Defense Intelligence Aviation
  - Special Purpose UAV Unit "Wings"
- 10th Spetsnaz Detachment
  - Spetsnaz Unit "Kabul 9"
- Spetsnaz Battalion "Artan"
  - Revanche Tactical Group
- Special Unit "Tymur" HUR MO
  - Spetsnaz Battalion "Aratta"
  - Spetsnaz Battalion "Sonechko"
  - Spetsnaz Battalion "Stuhna"
  - Spetsnaz Battalion "NOBODY"
  - Spetsnaz Battalion "Bratstvo"
  - Spetsnaz Unit "Chimera"
  - Spetsnaz Unit "Paragon Company"
  - Spetsnaz Unit "Black Winter Group"
  - 2nd Spetsnaz Detachment

== United Arab Emirates ==
UAE Presidential Guard

== United Kingdom ==
United Kingdom Special Forces (UKSF)

- Royal Navy
  - Special Boat Service (SBS)
    - Special Boat Service (Reserve)
- British Army
  - Special Air Service (SAS)
    - 22 Special Air Service Regiment
    - Special Air Service (Reserve) (SAS(R))
      - 21 Special Air Service Regiment (Artists) (Reserve)
      - 23 Special Air Service Regiment (Reserve)
  - Special Reconnaissance Regiment (SRR)
  - 18 (UKSF) Signal Regiment (Royal Corps of Signals)
  - Special Forces Support Group
- Royal Air Force/British Army
  - Special Forces Flight of 47 Squadron (Royal Air Force)
  - Joint Special Forces Aviation Wing
    - 7 Squadron (Royal Air Force)
    - 658 Squadron (Army Air Corps, British Army)

== United States ==
United States Special Operations Command (USSOCOM)

- Joint Special Operations Command (JSOC)
  - United States Army
    - 1st Special Forces Operational Detachment-Delta (1st SFOD-D or "Delta Force")
    - Intelligence Support Activity (ISA)
    - Aviation Technology Office (ATO) (formerly "Flight Concepts Division")
  - United States Navy
    - Naval Special Warfare Development Group (DEVGRU or "SEAL Team Six")
  - United States Air Force
    - 24th Special Tactics Squadron (24th STS)
    - 66th Air Operations Squadron (66th AOS)
    - 427th Special Operations Squadron (427th SOS)
    - 1st Joint Special Operations Aviation Component (1st JSOAC) (formerly the Aviation Tactics Evaluation Group/AVTEG)
- Army Special Operations Command (USASOC)
  - 1st Special Forces Command (Airborne) – 1st SFC (A)
  - Special Forces Groups ("Green Berets")
    - 1st Special Forces Group
    - 3rd Special Forces Group
    - 5th Special Forces Group
    - 7th Special Forces Group
    - 10th Special Forces Group
    - 19th Special Forces Group (National Guard)
    - 20th Special Forces Group (National Guard)
  - Psychological Operations Groups
    - 4th Psychological Operations Group (Airborne)
    - 8th Psychological Operations Group (Airborne)
  - 95th Civil Affairs Brigade
  - 528th Sustainment Brigade
    - 112th Special Operations Signal Battalion (Airborne)
    - 389th Military Intelligence Battalion (Airborne)
  - 75th Ranger Regiment
    - Regimental Reconnaissance Company (RRC)
  - Army Special Operations Aviation Command (USASOAC)
    - 160th Special Operations Aviation Regiment (Airborne) "Night Stalkers"
    - Army Special Operations Command Flight Company
- Naval Special Warfare Command (NSWC)
  - Naval Special Warfare Group 1
    - SEAL Teams 1, 3, 5 & 7
  - Naval Special Warfare Group 2
    - SEAL Teams 2, 4, 8 & 10
  - Naval Special Warfare Group 4
    - Special Boat Teams 12, 20 & 22
  - Naval Special Warfare Group 8
    - SEAL Delivery Vehicle Teams 1 & 2
    - Special Reconnaissance Teams 1 & 2
    - Training Detachment 3
    - Logistical Support 3
    - Mission Support Center
  - Naval Special Warfare Group 11
    - SEAL Teams 17 & 18 (Reserves)
- Air Force Special Operations Command (AFSOC)
  - 1st Special Operations Wing
  - 24th Special Operations Wing
  - 27th Special Operations Wing
  - 137th Special Operations Wing (ANG)
  - 193rd Special Operations Wing (ANG)
  - 919th Special Operations Wing (AFRC)
  - 352nd Special Operations Group
  - 353rd Special Operations Group
- Marine Corps Forces Special Operations Command (MARSOC)
  - Marine Raider Regiment
  - Marine Special Operations Support Group
- United States Space Forces – Special Operations Command

== Venezuela ==
Venezuelan Army

- 99th Army Special Operations Brigade

Venezuelan Air Force

- Special Operations Air Group 10
- Special Operations Air Group 15
- Special Operations Air Group 17

== Vietnam ==
General Staff of the Vietnam People's Army

- Vietnam People's Ground Force
  - Special Forces Arms
    - Special Forces Command at Thanh Trì District, Hanoi
    - 1st Special Operations Brigade (M1 Brigade) at Hanoi
    - 113th Land Commando Brigade at Vĩnh Phúc Province
    - 198th Land Commando Brigade at Đắk Lắk Province
    - 429th Land Commando Brigade at Bình Dương Province
    - 5th Maritime Commando Brigade at Ninh Thuận Province
  - High Command of Capital Hanoi
    - 18th Commando Battalion at Hanoi
  - 1st Corp
    - 1 Commando Battalion under Corps' staff at Ninh Bình
  - 2nd Corps
    - 1 Commando Battalion under Corps' staff at Bắc Giang
  - 3rd Corps
    - 20th Commando Battalion under Corps' staff at Pleiku, Gia Lai
  - 4th Corps
    - 1 Commando Battalion under Corps' staff at Bình Dương
  - 1st Military Region
    - 20th Commando Battalion at Thái Nguyên
  - 2nd Military Region
    - 19th Commando Battalion at Phú Thọ
  - 3nd Military Region
    - 41st Commando Battalion at Hải Phòng
  - 4th Military Region
    - 31st Commando Battalion at Hà Tĩnh
  - 5th Military Region
    - 409th Commando Battalion at Đà Nẵng
  - 7th Military Region
    - 60th Commando Battalion at Bình Dương
  - 9th Military Region
    - 2012nd Commando Battalion at Vĩnh Long
- Vietnam People's Navy
  - Naval Special Operations Force
    - 126th Naval Special Operations Brigade at Hải Phòng city
- General Department II
  - K3 Special Forces Brigade at Hà Nội
  - 74 Special Forces Brigade at Đà Nẵng
  - 94 Special Forces Brigade at Bình Dương

== Zimbabwe ==
Special Forces of Zimbabwe

== See also ==
- List of commando units
- List of Special Reconnaissance organizations

== Notes ==
Miscellaneous Notes
