= Vidar Unit (Ukraine) =

- Спеціальний підрозділ Відар
- Insignia
- Founded: 2016
- Country: Ukraine
- Branch: Main Directorate of Intelligence
- Type: Spetsnaz
- Role: Reconnaissance, counteroffensive and sabotage
- Size: Detachment
- Part of: Tymur Special Operations Detachment
- Engagements: Russo-Ukrainian War; Russian invasion of Ukraine

Commanders
- Current commander: Ruslan Kaganets

The Special Forces "Vidar" Unit is a Ukrainian military unit, part of the spetsnaz units of the Main Directorate of Intelligence of Ukraine formed in 2016 as part of the Sonechko Battalion, becoming separate in 2024. It is a part of Tymur Special Unit.

== History ==
It was established on the basis of personnel from the 46th Airborne Assault Brigade, some time in 2016 and was initially tasked with reconnaissance activities.

Following the Russian invasion of Ukraine, it saw action during the Battle of Kyiv, Battle of Irpin, Battle of Hostomel and the Battle of Bucha. In April 2024, it separated from the Sonechko Battalion and became a separate unit under Tymur. In November 2024, it received assistance from Onokivska community.

== Commanders ==
- Kyrylo Budanov
- Ruslan Kaganets

== Equipment ==
- BMP-2
- M113
- Hummer
