= Kabul 9 =

- Кабул 9
- Insignia
- Country: Ukraine
- Branch: Main Directorate of Intelligence
- Type: Special Forces
- Role: FPV warfare, sniper warfare, mortar strikes, special operations
- Part of: 10th Special Purpose Detachment
- Engagements: Russo-Ukrainian War; Russian invasion of Ukraine; Northern Ukraine campaign; Battle of Kyiv; Battle of Hostomel; Battle of Brovary; Eastern Ukraine campaign; Battle of Bakhmut; Southern Ukraine campaign; 2023 Ukrainian counteroffensive

Insignia
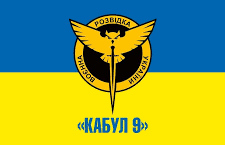
- Flag

The Kabul 9 is a special forces unit of the Main Directorate of Intelligence subordinated to the Ministry of Defense of Ukraine and specializes in FPV drone warfare undertaking many combat operations during the Russian invasion of Ukraine.

== History ==
The "Kabul 9" unit was formed at the beginning of the Russian invasion of Ukraine in 2022, by veterans of the Ukrainian Army and special forces. They took part in fighting alongside American and British forces as part of ISAF during the War in Afghanistan and also participated in the withdrawal of allied forces during the Fall of Kabul which became the unit's namesake. It took part in the Northern Ukraine campaign, especially in the Battle of Kyiv, Battle of Hostomel and Battle of Brovary, being later transferred to southern and eastern Ukraine taking part in the Battle of Bakhmut and the 2023 Ukrainian counteroffensive. Russian logistical supply lines, KAMAZ and Ural trucks have been the key targets of the unit.

Two Su-25s were shot down by the unit in 2022. Its mortar units and snipers took on heavy combat duties during the Battle of Bakhmut especially against the units of Wagner Group inflicting heavy casualties. On 23 December 2023, Kabul 9 used FPV drones to destroy a Russian tank, an armored personnel carrier, a GAZ-66, and a UAZ-452 in Zaporizhzhia Oblast. On 9 January 2024, the State Security Service of Ukraine published a list of equipment destroyed by Kabul 9 throughout the war which included 12 Main battle tanks, 25 armored vehicles, 2 Su-25 aircraft, 11 artillery systems and 12 electronic warfare systems. Furthermore 33 self-propelled guns, 16 electronic warfare complexes, 24 SAM complexes and 2 command posts were destroyed in cooperation with the Armed Forces of Ukraine. In February 2024, it destroyed two military vehicles and a civilian SUV operated by Russian military in Zaporizhzhia. On 13 March 2024, it destroyed two Russian trucks and a buggy and an FPV operator position using UAVs as well as destroying a Russian Murom-M surveillance complex, totalling to six units if equipment in two days. On 18 April 2024, HUR reported that Kabul 9 had destroyed nine Russian vehicles and a field ammunition depot in the last two days. On 23 May 2024, its UAVs destroyed Russian vehicles during a night raid as well as killing personnel. On 3 July 2024 "Kabul 9" destroyed more than a dozen Russian automobiles and armored vehicles of the invaders in a single day. In the first week of December 2024, its FPV drones destroyed five Russian trucks, two UAZs, one Niva and an ATV. On 3 December 2024, the unit destroyed Russian transport vehicles and a BM-21 Grad MLRS.

On 24 January 2025, Pantelis Boumbouras visited the unit's headquarters and donated 550,000 hryvnias to it.

== Equipment ==
It operates a variety of unmanned aerial vehicles including the DeViRo Leleka-100.
