= Stuhna Battalion =

Ukrainian military volunteer unit

- Батальйон «Стугна»
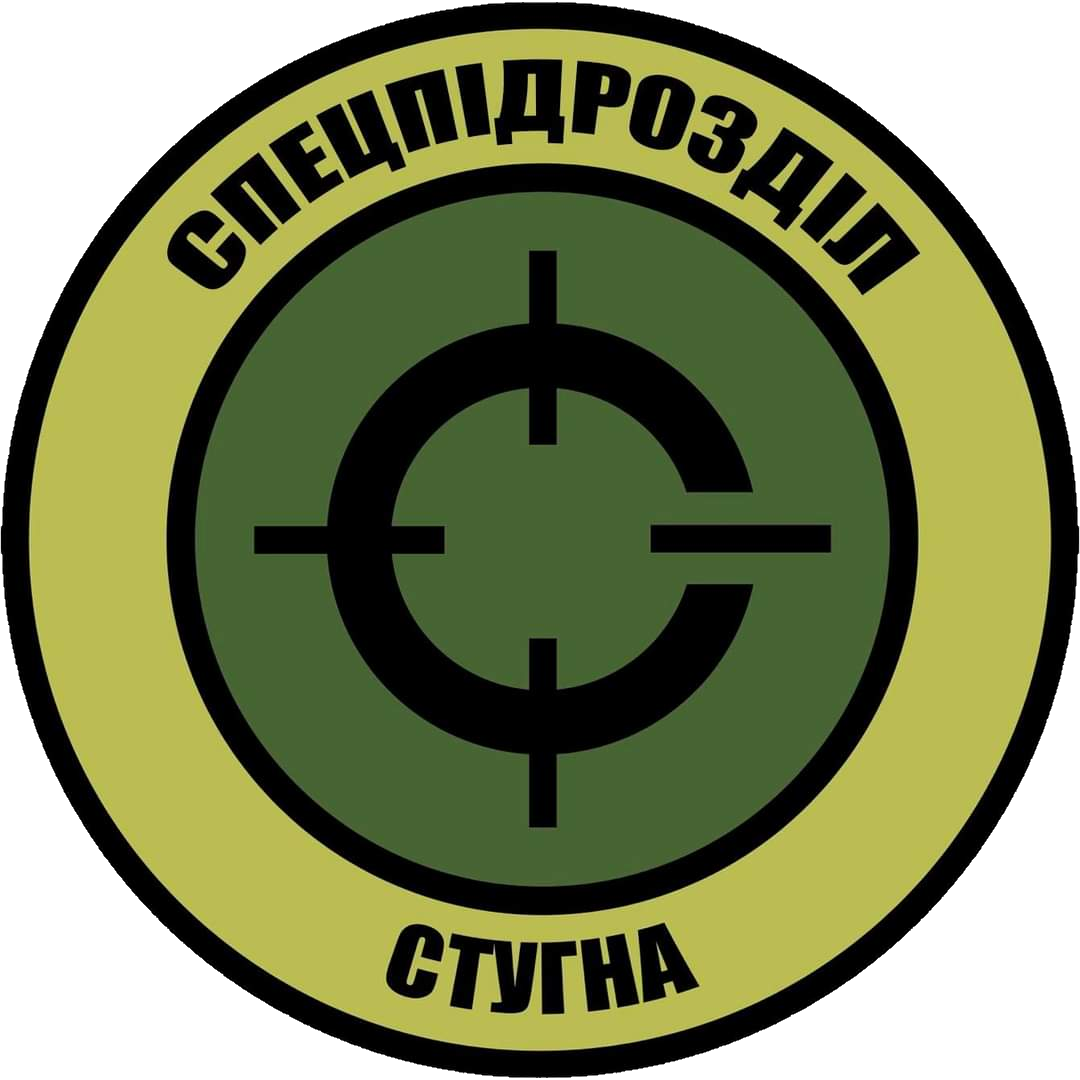
- Stuhna Battalion's insignia
- Founded: 2022
- Country: Ukraine
- Allegiance: Ministry of Defence
- Branch: Main Directorate of Intelligence
- Type: Spetsnaz
- Role: Reconnaissance, counteroffensive and sabotage
- Part of: Tymur Special Operations Detachment
- Motto(s): In hoc signo vinces
- Engagements: Russo-Ukrainian War; Russian invasion of Ukraine; Northern Ukraine campaign; Battle of Hostomel; Battle of Antonov Airport; Eastern Ukraine campaign; 2022 Kharkiv counteroffensive; Battle of Bakhmut; 2024 Kharkiv offensive; Battle of Vovchansk; Southern Ukraine campaign; Dnieper campaign; Zaporizhzhia Nuclear Power Plant crisis; Crimea campaign; Western Russia campaign

The Stuhna Battalion is a Ukrainian Battalion level military unit, part of the spetsnaz units of the Main Directorate of Intelligence of Ukraine formed in March 2022 as a response to the Russian invasion of Ukraine and has taken part in multiple combat operations throughout the Russo-Ukrainian War.

== History ==
It was established on 16 March 2022 from volunteers. It is named after Stuhna, a tributary of the Dnieper which flows in the Obukhiv Raion. The battalion was established on the basis of the 135th Territorial Defense Battalion of the 114th Territorial Defense Brigade. The battalion personnel first saw combat during the Battle of Hostomel and the Battle of Antonov Airport where they, together with other units successfully ambush a column of Russian paratroopers near the glass factory in Hostomel.

In May 2022, the battalion fought in the 2022 Kharkiv counteroffensive in the villages of Dementiivka, Velyki Prokhody and Pitomnyk. In October 2022, personnel of the Stuhna battalion with support from the Transcarpathian "Sonechko" volunteer battalion shot down a Russian military aircraft with a Stinger missile. A soldier of the unit, Mykhailo Matviyiv died on 18 August 2022 during a battle in Maksymivka, Mykolaiv Oblast and another soldier, Artem Medvedev died on 21 August 2022 while fighting in the Donetsk Oblast. In January 2023, the Stuhna unit, together with other units of the HUR, landed on the left bank of the Dnieper near Nova Kakhovka. The unit destroyed a company command post and killed several dozen Russian soldiers.

In March 2023, fighters of the Stuhna unit, using a Falcon Avanger kamikaze drone, destroyed the Russian Murom-M visual surveillance complex on the Kakhovka hydroelectric power station in the Kherson Oblast. In April 2023, the battalion took part in the Battle of Bakhmut and maintained positions in the village of Khromove to guard roads used by Ukrainian troops.

In July 2023, Mykyta Krasnovid was killed in a battle in southern Ukraine. Irish volunteer Robert Deegan was killed in action on 19 September 2024, during the Battle of Vovchansk Aggregate Plant on 24 September 2024, the Stuhna battalion together with Paragon, Junger, BDK, RDK and Terror conducted a successful operation to liberate the Vovchansk Aggregate Plant.

== Commanders ==
- Linko Dmytro Volodymyrovych

== Sources ==
- Telegram батальйону «Стугни»
- Instagram батальйону «Стугни»
- Facebook батальйону «Стугни»
- Веб-сайт патронатної служби
- Telegram патронатної служби
- Instagram патронатної служби
- Facebook патронатної служби
- Кадри штурму позицій росіян біля «дороги життя» на Бахмут
- Історія битви за «дорогу життя» під Бахмутом
- «Це наше небо»: боєць ЗСУ на Запоріжжі збив ворожий літак із ПЗРК «Stinger»
- Батальйон «Стугна» підірвав на міні ворожий БТР
- Фотозвіт: Як проходить тренування українських воїнів батальйону «Стугна»
- Дрон-камікадзе Falcon Avanger розправився з вежею спостереження РФ «Муром-М» на дамбі Каховської ГЕС
- Броварський екс-журналіст про війну на Харківщині та Миколаївщині в складі батальйону «Стугна»
- Батальйон «Стугна», яким керує депутат Кіровоградської облради, показав кадри ближніх боїв з окупантами
- «Лівий берег Дніпра буде наш!» — батальйон «Стугна» про рік на війні
- Батальйон «Стугна» показав наведення і влучання українського дрона-камікадзе у російський бліндаж
- На сайті Президента просять присвоїти звання Героїв двом полтавцям, які полягли на війні
- В Україні створили модель дрона-камікадзе з РКГ-3
- Командир підрозділу «Стугна» Лінько: «Форсування лівого берега Дніпра — дуже важка справа. Але ми постійно думаємо, як туди перейти, і ми перейдемо»
- ЗСУ потрібно прорвати першу та другу лінії оборони РФ для швидкого просування на півдні, — командир підрозділу «Стугна»
- Командир підрозділу Стугна Дмитро Лінько розповів, що на півдні України окупанти бояться наступу ЗСУ
- «Треба масова мобілізація, а не тусовки» — військовий інструктор з Ізраїлю Денис Десятник
- Погодні умови на півдні сприяють очікуванню гарних новин, — командир підрозділу «Стугна» Лінько
- Війна добра проти зла: Дмитро Лінько у проєкті «Немаленькі люди» від IRI
- Дмитро Лінько закликає жителів Кіровоградщини підтримати херсонців
- Заступник голови Кіровоградської облради долучиться до сесії онлайн із передової
- Місяць у підвалі, рабобуд у Поворознюка, коли Україна переможе. Інтерв'ю Бацман з екснардепом Ліньком, який воює на фронті
- Вишкіл розвідників та штурмовиків підрозділу «Стугна»
- ГУР показало вишкіл розвідників та штурмовиків підрозділу «Стугна»
- Епізоди із вишколу розвідників й штурмовиків Стугни
- Розвідники в тилу окупантів: як споряджаються та що беруть з собою на завдання
