= Bratstvo Battalion =

Ukrainian military volunteer unit

Bratstvo Battalion (Brotherhood Battalion)
- Батальйон «Братство»
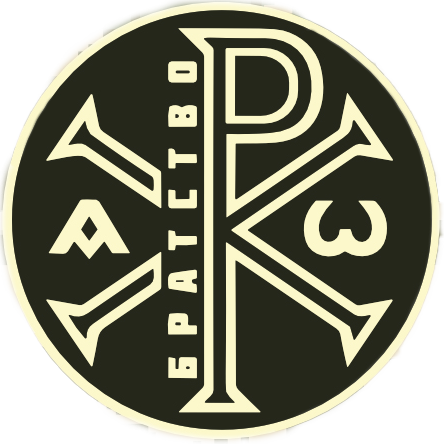
- Bratstvo Battalion's insignia
- Founded: 2022
- Country: Ukraine
- Allegiance: Ministry of Defence; Bratstvo
- Branch: Main Directorate of Intelligence
- Type: Spetsnaz
- Role: Reconnaissance, counteroffensive and sabotage
- Part of: Tymur Special Unit
- Motto: In hoc signo vinces
- Engagements: Russo-Ukrainian War; Russian invasion of Ukraine; Northern Ukraine campaign; Battle of Kyiv; Eastern Ukraine campaign; 2022 Kharkiv counteroffensive; Battle of Bakhmut; 2024 Kharkiv offensive; Battle of Vovchansk; Southern Ukraine campaign; Dnieper campaign; Zaporizhzhia Nuclear Power Plant crisis; Crimea campaign; Western Russia campaign

Commanders
- Current commander: Oleksiy Seredyuk

Insignia
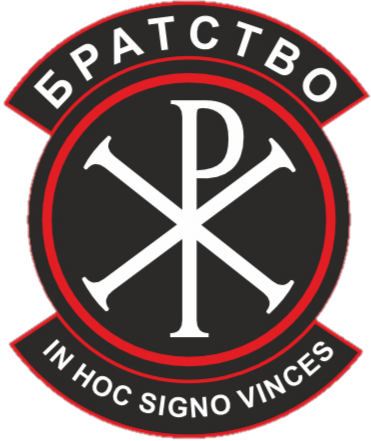
- Shoulder patch

The Bratstvo Battalion is a Ukrainian battalion-level military formation, part of the special forces units of the Main Directorate of Intelligence of Ukraine formed in 2022 as a response to the full-scale Russian invasion of Ukraine. It has taken part in multiple combat operations throughout the Russo-Ukrainian War. The battalion is a far-right Christian nationalist and neo-feudalist volunteer organization which recruits Christian volunteers from throughout the world.

== History ==
It was established on 24 February 2022 by the far-right political party "Brotherhood" of the ultranationalist political leader Dmytro Korchynsky. During the Northern Ukraine campaign, the battalion took an active part in combat, defending Baryshivka and liberating Lukianivka, Rudnytske, Nova Basan and Peremoha. Later, it took part in the 2022 Kharkiv offensive and the Battle of Izium. The battalion's aerial reconnaissance unit also participated in the 2022 Kherson offensive. On 12 September 2022, a soldier of the battalion, Yevgeny Roldugin was killed in Kharkiv Oblast. On 8 December 2022, American volunteer Caliph Gordon Charles "Flash" was killed in combat under undisclosed circumstances. The battalion's fighters took part in sabotage operations in the aftermath of the Battle of Enerhodar and in the Western Russia campaign in Belgorod Oblast and Bryansk Oblast.

A part of the battalion also took part in the Battle of Bakhmut where it suffered its greatest losses. On 25 December 2022, a group of battalion sabotage personnel conducted a raid in Bryansk Oblast but were ambushed by Russian forces; Maksim Ruslanovych Mykhaylov, Taras Yuriyovych Karpyuk, Yuriy Serhiyovych Horovets, and Bohdan Oleksandrovych Lyagov were killed.

On 19 April 2023, four left-wing international volunteers attached to the battalion - American Cooper Turner Andrews, Irishman Finbar Cafferkey, Mexican Bradley Thomas Yarema, and Dmitry Petrov - were killed in the Battle of Bakhmut. In September 2023, the Stugna and Bratstvo battalion participated in the liberation of the Boyko Towers. In October 2023, the Stuhna and Bratstvo battalions landed on the Crimean peninsula and hit Russian forces, inflicting casualties. In May-June 2024, the battalion saw combat in the 2024 Kharkiv offensive.

During the 2024 Kharkiv offensive, the battalion saw combat in the Battle of Vovchansk and suffered casualties in the form of killed and wounded, at least one soldier of the battalion was also captured by Russian forces. On 12 May 2024, during the Battle of Vovchansk, the commander of the battalion assault group, Colonel Zhuk Konstantin Alexandrovich was killed while covering the retreat of other personnel.

== Commanders ==
- Oleksiy Seredyuk (2022-)

== Structure ==
- Management and Headquarters
- Commandant Platoon
- Company of the Fraternal Order of Jesus Christ
- Drone Unit
