= Oleh Ivashchenko (Ukrainian general) =

Ukrainian military officer

- Олег Іващенко
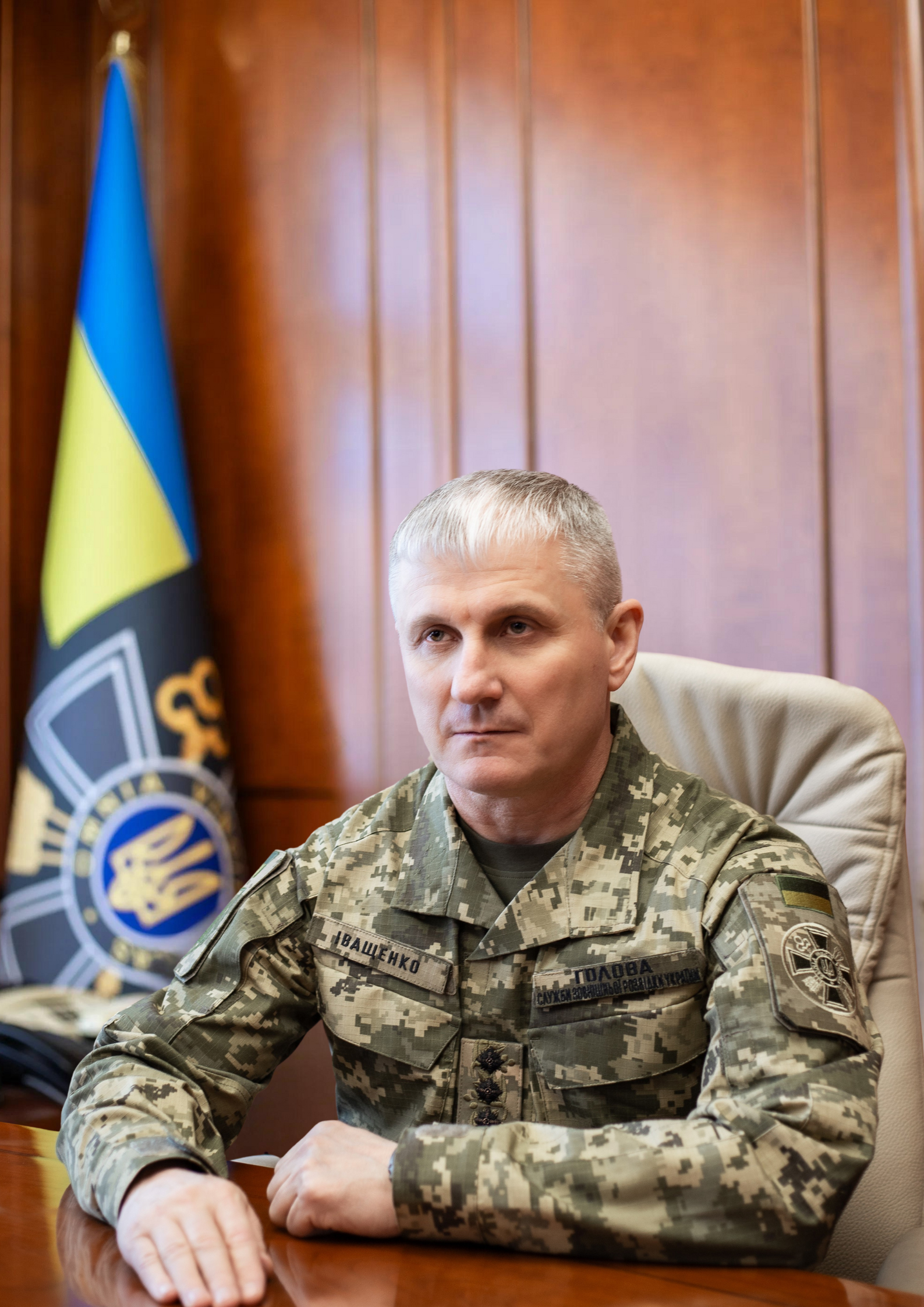
- Ivashchenko in 2025

Chief of the Main Directorate of Intelligence of Ukraine
- Incumbent
- Assumed office 2 January 2026
- Preceded by: Kyrylo Budanov

Head of the Foreign Intelligence Service of Ukraine
- In office 26 March 2024 – 2 January 2026
- Preceded by: Oleksandr Lytvynenko
- Succeeded by: Oleksandr Kononenko

Personal details
- Born: 9 September 1969 (age 56)

Military service
- Allegiance: Ukraine
- Branch/service: Armed Forces of Ukraine
- Rank: Lieutenant general
- Commands: Main Directorate of Intelligence
- Battles/wars: Russian invasion of Ukraine

Oleh Ivanovych Ivashchenko (Ukrainian: Олег Іванович Іващенко; born 9 September 1969) is a Ukrainian military officer and lieutenant general who has served as the head of the Main Directorate of Intelligence of the Ministry of Defense of Ukraine since 2 January 2026, replacing Kyrylo Budanov. Before that, he was the head of the Foreign Intelligence Service from 26 March 2024.

== Military career ==
As of October 2017, in the rank of Major General, he served as the First Deputy Chief of the Defence Intelligence of Ukraine, Deputy Chief of the General Staff of the Armed Forces of Ukraine for Intelligence.

Since 2021, he has simultaneously served as Assistant Commander-in-Chief of the Armed Forces of Ukraine.

He performed these duties until 26 March 2024, when he was appointed Head of the Foreign Intelligence Service of Ukraine by President Volodymyr Zelenskyy.

On 2 January 2026, Zelenskyy announced that Ivashchenko would head the Main Directorate of Intelligence of the Ministry of Defense of Ukraine, replacing Kyrylo Budanov, who was appointed Head of the Office of the President of Ukraine.
