= Kyrylo Budanov =

Ukrainian lieutenant general (born 1986)

- Кирило Буданов
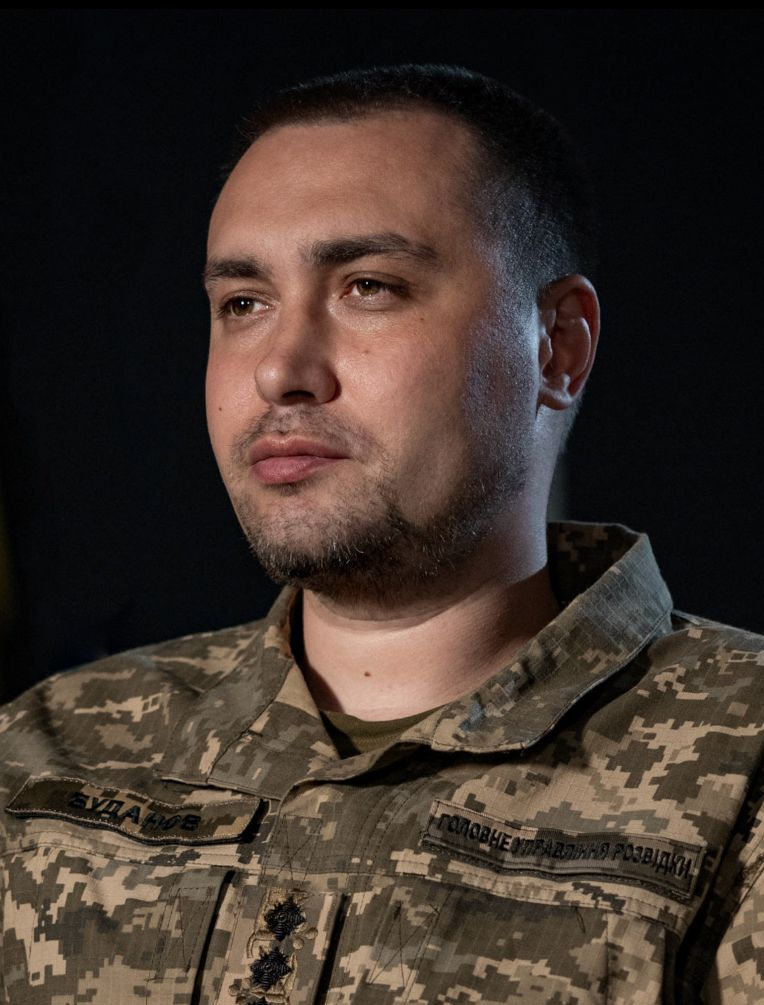
- Budanov in 2024

Head of the Office of the President of Ukraine
- Incumbent
- Assumed office 2 January 2026
- President: Volodymyr Zelenskyy
- Preceded by: Andriy Yermak

Chief of the Main Directorate of Intelligence of Ukraine
- In office 5 August 2020 – 2 January 2026
- Preceded by: Vasyl Burba
- Succeeded by: Oleh Ivashchenko

Personal details
- Born: 4 January 1986 (age 40) Kyiv, Ukrainian SSR, Soviet Union (now Kyiv, Ukraine)
- Spouse: Marianna O. Budanova
- Education: Odesa Military Academy
- Awards: Hero of Ukraine

Military service
- Allegiance: Ukraine
- Branch/service: Armed Forces of Ukraine
- Years of service: 2007–present
- Rank: Lieutenant general
- Commands: Main Directorate of Intelligence
- Battles/wars: Russo-Ukrainian War; War in Donbas (WIA); Russian invasion of Ukraine; 2022 Crimean Bridge explosion

Kyrylo Oleksiiovych Budanov (Ukrainian: Кирило Олексійович Буданов; born 4 January 1986) is a Ukrainian military leader who has served as the Head of the Office of the President of Ukraine since 2 January 2026. Before that, he served as the chief of the Main Directorate of Intelligence of the Ministry of Defense of Ukraine from August 2020. Budanov previously served as the deputy director of one of the departments of the Foreign Intelligence Service of Ukraine. He holds the rank of lieutenant general.

== Early life and education ==
Budanov was born in Kyiv on 4 January 1986. He graduated from the Odesa Institute of the Ground Forces in 2007.

== Career ==
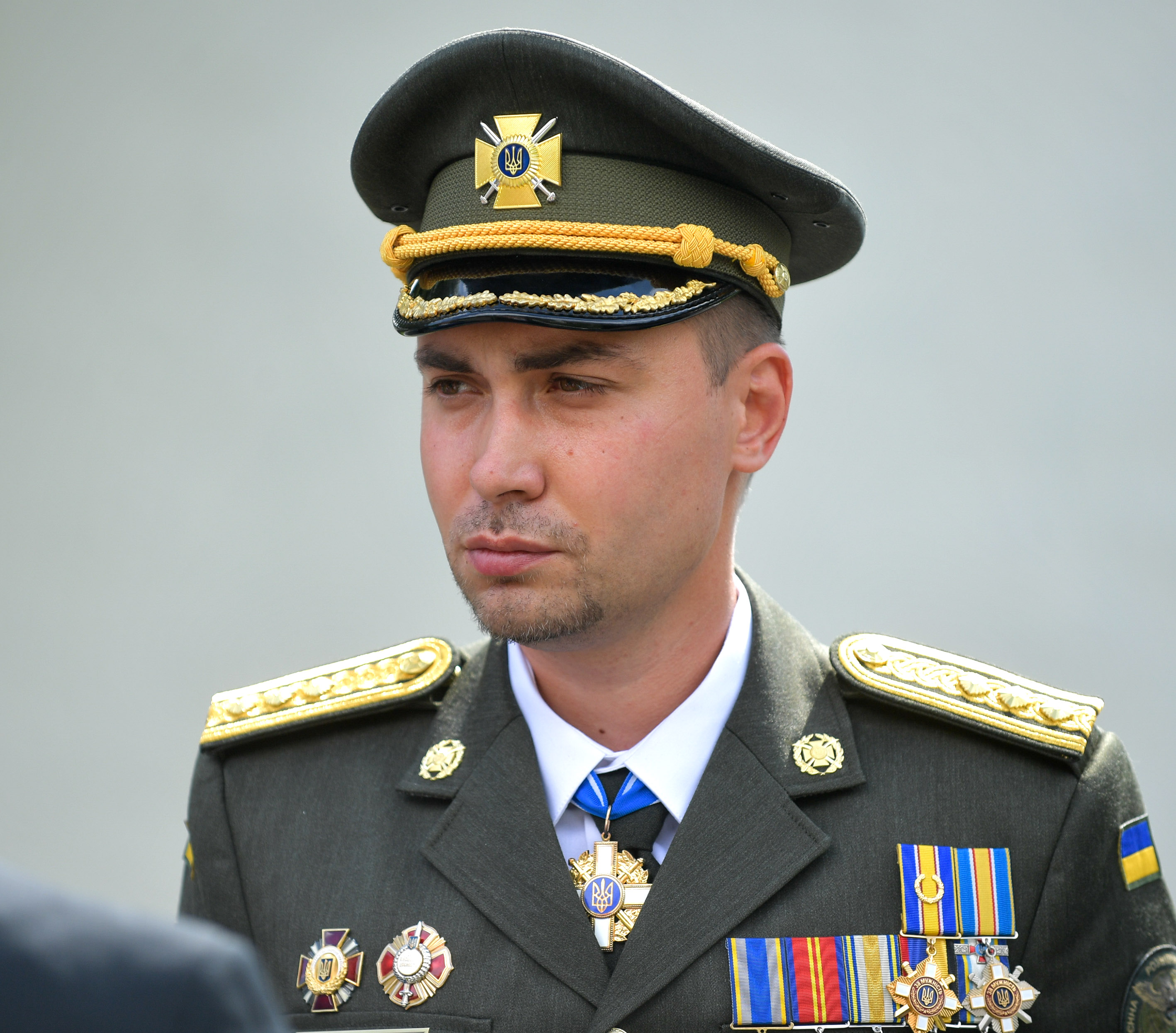
Budanov in 2020

Following his 2007 graduation, Budanov started a military career in the special forces of the Main Directorate of Intelligence (HUR) of the Ministry of Defence of Ukraine.

=== Russo-Ukrainian War ===
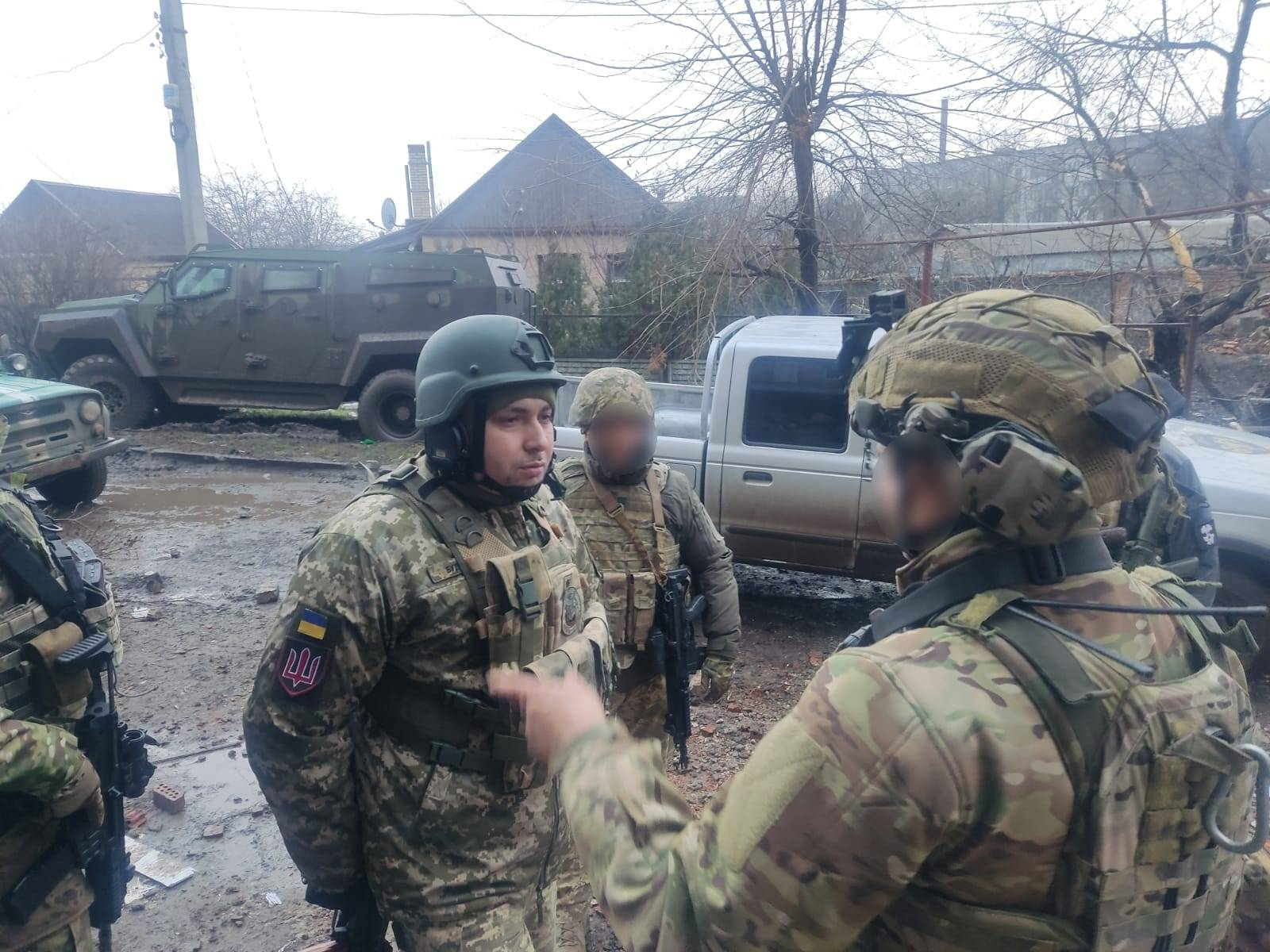
Budanov in Bakhmut on 28 December 2022

In 2014, he took part in the war in Donbas, where he was wounded several times and reportedly participated in a number of classified special military operations. According to a 2024 report by The New York Times, Budanov was one of the members of the elite Unit 2245 of the Ukrainian Main Intelligence Directorate trained by CIA. The New York Times reports that Budanov gained a reputation for participating in bold operations behind enemy lines. In 2016, while still a lieutenant colonel, he reportedly led a special forces unit in an amphibious raid on Russian-occupied Crimea to plant explosives at an airfield. Budanov's unit was ambushed by a Russian commando unit after landing; the Ukrainian force killed several Russian soldiers before retreating to Ukrainian-controlled territory. According to The New York Times, Budanov was brought to the United States for treatment at the Walter Reed National Military Medical Center after being wounded in fighting in the Donbas.

On 4 April 2019, Budanov's Chevrolet Evanda car was blown up by a Russian with documents in the name of "Alexei Lomaka", who planted a mine, but it detonated prematurely. The attacker and the sabotage group suspected of blowing up Budanov were detained.

In 2020, he became deputy director of one of the departments of the Foreign Intelligence Service of Ukraine.

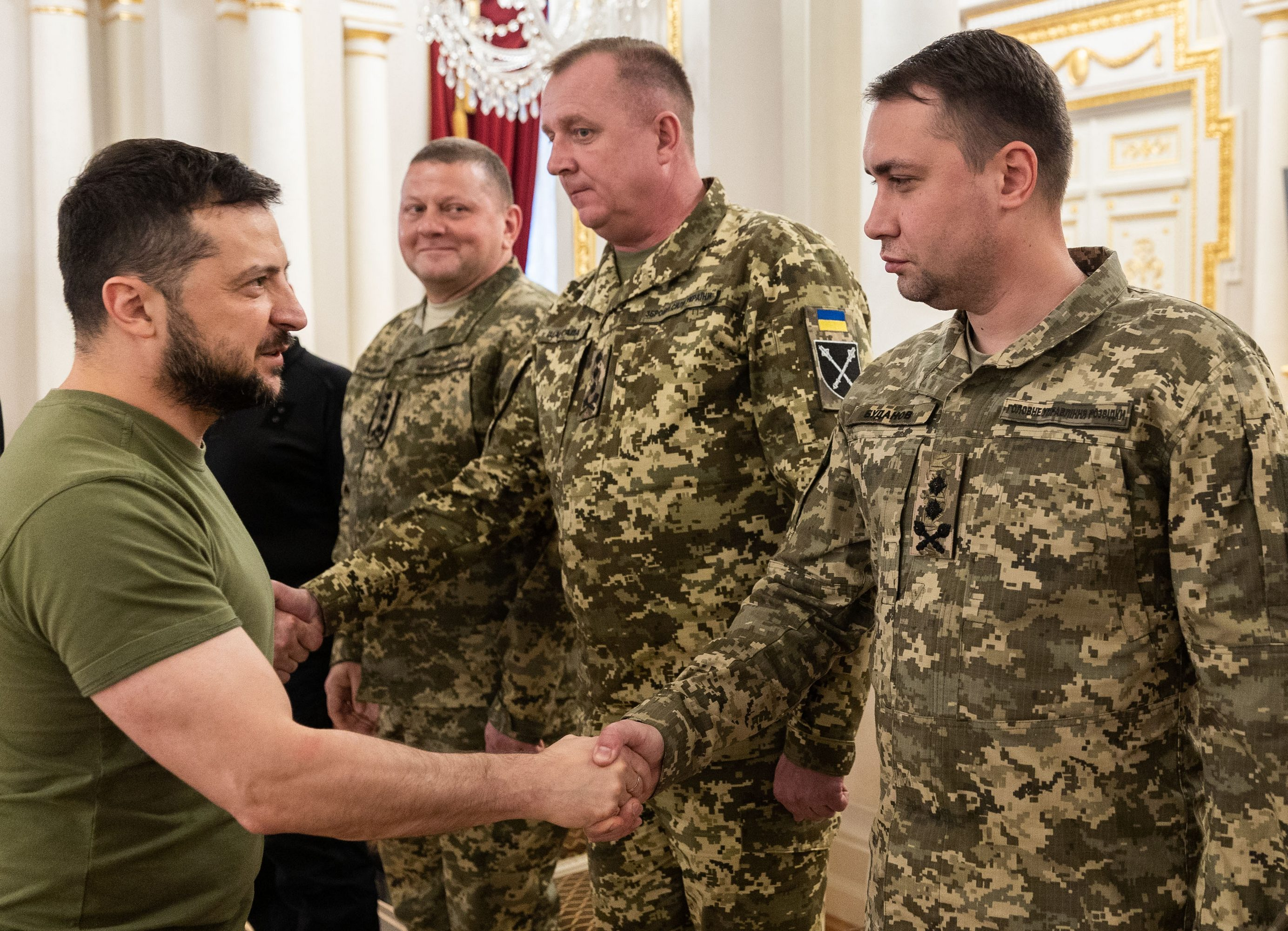
Budanov shaking hands with President of Ukraine Volodymyr Zelenskyy on 7 September 2022

On 5 August 2020, President of Ukraine Volodymyr Zelenskyy appointed Budanov as head of the Main Intelligence Directorate of the Ministry of Defense.

On 11 March 2022 he became the chairman of the Coordinating Headquarters for the Treatment of Prisoners of War. In September 2022, Budanov was involved in the largest prisoner exchange operation between Ukraine and the Russian Federation, when 215 Ukrainian defenders returned home, including more than 100 fighters and commanders of the Azov Regiment.

In February 2023, the head of the Servant of the People parliamentary bloc, Davyd Arakhamia, stated that Oleksii Reznikov would be replaced by Budanov as defence minister. However, the replacement did not take place, and Budanov was not appointed. Rustem Umerov would eventually replace Reznikov.

A spokesman for Ukrainian military intelligence said in 2023 that there had been more than ten assassination attempts on Budanov. In November 2023 his wife, Marianna Budanova, was poisoned with unspecified heavy metals, probably from poisoned food, and several agency employees had mild symptoms of poisoning.

On 8 February 2024, Budanov was recognized as a Hero of Ukraine by President Zelenskyy.

On 2 January 2026, Kyrylo Budanov was appointed as Head of the Office of the President of Ukraine, replacing Andriy Yermak, who had resigned on 28 November 2025.

In January 2026, Budanov congratulated Denis Kapustin for ″returning to life″, with sources saying that Ukraine staged his death in order to lure out Russian assailants. According to the HUR, Ukraine gained the $500,000 bounty of ″killing″ Kapustin.

== Criminal prosecution in absentia by Russia ==
On 21 April 2023, the Lefortovo District court in Moscow, Russia issued an arrest warrant against Budanov in relation to the 2022 Ukrainian attack on the Crimean Bridge, charging him with creating a terrorist community, illegal acquisition of weapons by a group of persons, and illegal acquisition of explosive devices by a group of persons. Budanov commented on the warrant, stating, "I am pleased. This is a good indicator of our work, and I promise to work even better". In an interview, Budanov stated that what the Russian government considers terrorism, he calls liberation, and linked the events to the invasion of his country in 2014. As clarified by The New York Times, U.S. intelligence attributes the assassination of Darya Dugina to the Ukrainian government. In response to a question about this accusation, Budanov asked not to pursue the topic further and declared:

Everything I will comment on is that we have killed Russians and will kill Russians anywhere in the world until Ukraine's complete victory".

On 8 May 2023, during an official briefing at the U.S. State Department, a question was posed requesting an assessment of this statement. The State Department spokesperson stated that they do not condone attacks on civilians regardless of where they occur: in Russia, Ukraine, or anywhere else.

On 25 December 2023, the Basmanny District Court of Moscow issued an in absentia arrest warrant for Kyrylo Budanov (charged with committing 104 terrorist acts). In an October press release, Russia's Investigative Committee accused Budanov of organizing and carrying out, from April 2022 to September 2023, more than 100 airstrikes using fixed-wing unmanned aerial vehicles against the territories of Moscow and Moscow Oblast, Rostov, Belgorod, and Bryansk oblasts, as well as the Russia-annexed Crimea and Sevastopol.

== Military ranks ==
- Brigadier general (24 August 2021)
- Major general (3 April 2022)
- Lieutenant general (7 September 2023)

== Awards ==
- Hero of Ukraine (2024)
- Cross of Military Merit (2022)
- Full Knight of the Order for Courage
- ~~Officer of the Order of Merit of the Republic of Poland (Poland, 2025)~~ (Budanov renounced the award in 2026 in response to the Polish Order of the White Eagle controversy)

Political offices
Preceded by Andriy Yermak	Head of the Presidential Office; 2026–	Incumbent
