= Black Winter Group (Ukraine) =

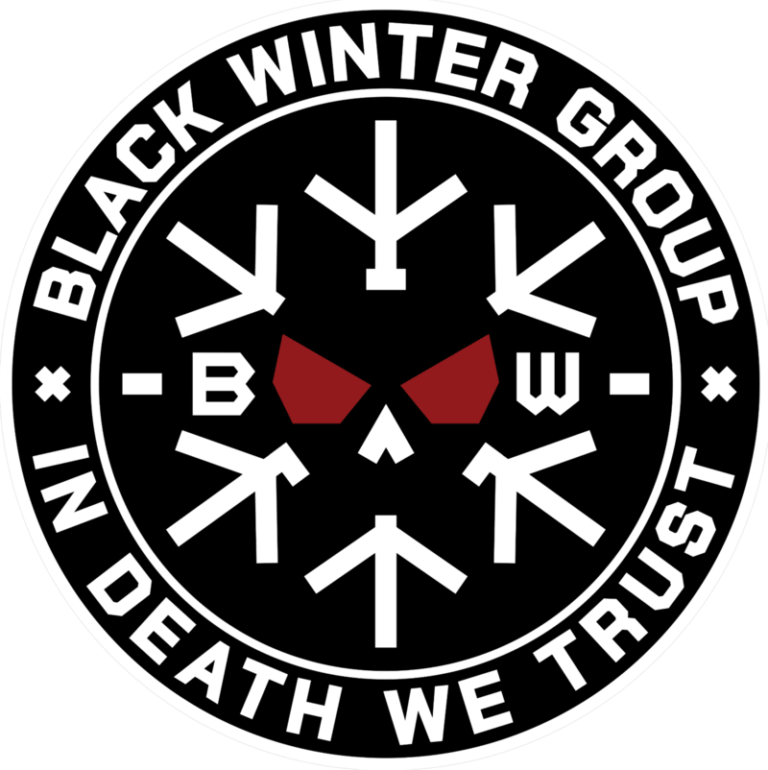
- Group insignia
- Founded: February 2022
- Country: Ukraine
- Branch: Main Directorate of Intelligence: Tymur Special Unit
- Type: Spetsnaz
- Role: Reconnaissance, counteroffensive and sabotage
- Size: Platoon
- Engagements: Russo-Ukrainian War; Russian invasion of Ukraine; Northern Ukraine campaign; Battle of Kyiv; Battle of Bucha; Battle of Hostomel; Battle of Irpin; Eastern Ukraine campaign; Southern Ukraine campaign; Western Russia campaign

Commanders
- Current commander: "Liutyi"

The Special Forces "Black Winter" Group is a spetsnaz unit of the Tymur Special Unit of the Main Directorate of Intelligence of Ukraine formed in 2022 as a response to the Russian invasion of Ukraine.

== History ==
It was established in 2022 following the Russian invasion of Ukraine and took part in the Battle of Bucha, Battle of Hostomel and the Battle of Irpin in the early stages of war as part of the Northern Ukraine campaign. Most operations of the group are kept secret. On 20 November 2024, recruits of the group took the oath of allegiance to Ukraine. On 2 January 2025, one hundred FPV drones were handed over to the group by Artem Pyvovarov.

== Commanders ==
- Сurrent commander "Liutyi"
