= Ukrainian Defense Intelligence Aviation =

HUR Aviation
- Авіація воєнної розвідки
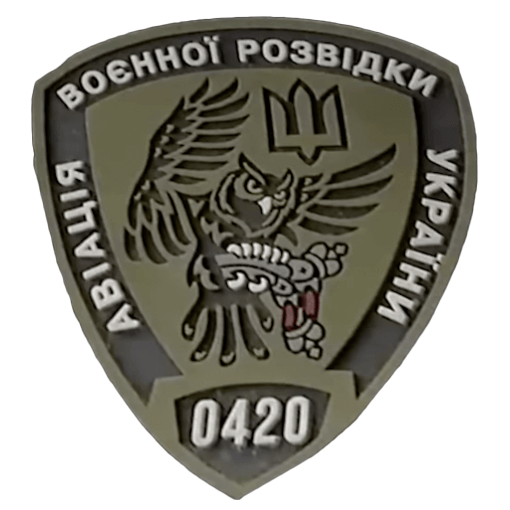
- Insignia
- Country: Ukraine
- Branch: Main Directorate of Intelligence
- Type: Aviation
- Role: Strike, Reconnaissance, Assaults, Evacuations and Raids
- Nickname(s): Major General Maksym Shapoval
- Engagements: Russo-Ukrainian War; War in Donbas; Russian invasion of Ukraine

The Defense Intelligence Aviation of Ukraine (MUN A0420) is the aerial operations wing of the Main Intelligence Directorate subordinated to the Ministry of Defense of Ukraine. It operates a variety of rotor wing aircraft and unmanned aerial vehicles and has seen heavy combat during the Russian invasion of Ukraine.

== History ==
It has seen combat on multiple occasions during the Russian invasion of Ukraine utilizing various types of helicopters. Its helicopters took part in the Siege of Mariupol along with those of the Ukrainian Army Aviation to evacuate wounded from Azovstal. On January 20, 2023, the special forces unit "Wings" under the HUR aviation announced the creation of a flotilla of FPV drones, purchasing 1,000 UAVs and it was completed on 23 April 2023. On 14 January 2024, a Russian A-50U was destroyed and an Il-22M was damaged in a joint operation by HUR and Ukrainian Air Force, and on 19 April 2024, a Russian Tu-22M3 was destroyed in a similar operation. On 17 April 2024, HUR UAVs attacked the 590th Radio-technical unit in Kovylkino, destroying the 29B6 Container, about 680 kilometers from the border. On 24 April 2024, HUR UAVs attacked the Novolipetsk Metallurgical Plant. On 26 May 2024, it attacked and destroyed a Russian Voronezh radar in Orsk.

On 8 June 2024, its UAVs struck the Akhtubinsk airbase in the Astrakhan Oblast destroying a Su-57, it was the first fifth generation aircraft to be destroyed in the war. On 9 June 2024, the Ukrainian HUR claimed to have damaged two Russian Su-57 fighter jets, in the strike. However, Russian Telegram channel Fighterbomber, stated that only one aircraft was damaged. The ISW noted the criticism that despite the value of a single Su-57 being an estimated $35 million, it wasn't protected by a hanger. On 16 August 2024, it struck the Savasleyka airfield with UAVs destroying three aircraft including a MiG-31K/I and damaging five more.

== Inventory ==
Model	Image	Origin	Type	Number	Details
Helicopters
Mil Mi-24		Soviet Union	Attack helicopter		
Sikorsky UH-60 Black Hawk		USA	Attack helicopter	Two aircraft with an additional being crowdfunded for GUR by Czech supporters under the "Gift for Putin" (Dárek pro-Putina) initiative.	
Bayraktar TB2		Turkey	Unmanned Aerial Vehicle	3-5 aircraft	

Several types of FPV drones are also under its operation.

== Structure ==
- Management and Headquarters
- Commandant Platoon
- Helicopter Squadron
- UAV Squadron "Wings"
