= 2nd Special Operations Detachment (Ukraine) =

2nd Special Purpose Detachment
- 2 Загін Спеціальних Дій
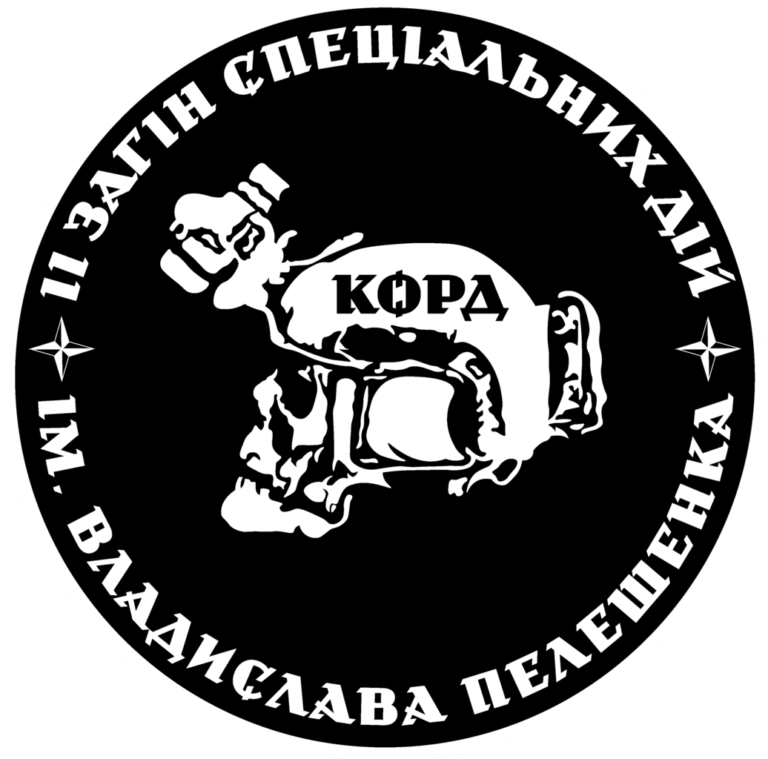
- Battalion insignia
- Founded: 2022
- Country: Ukraine
- Branch: Main Directorate of Intelligence
- Type: Spetsnaz
- Role: Reconnaissance, counteroffensive and sabotage
- Size: Detachment
- Part of: Tymur Special Unit
- Engagements: Russo-Ukrainian War; Russian invasion of Ukraine

The 2nd Special Purpose Detachment "Vladyslav Peleshenko" is a volunteer special operations unit, one of the spetsnaz units of the Main Directorate of Intelligence, the unit was established in 2022. Composed mostly of volunteers from within Ukraine and abroad, the unit conducts special reconnaissance, sabotage, and other covert operations. It is a part of Tymur Special Unit.

== History ==
The detachment has the honorary name of Vladyslav Peleshenko in reference to a soldier of the HUR who had been killed in action and awarded the Hero of Ukraine. On 11 September 2024, the 2nd Special Operations Detachment conducted a raid on the coast of Crimea in cooperation with several other units, destroying a Russian Su-30SM aircraft with MANPADS. They attacked a Russian oil and gas platform with light and medium weapons and inflicted casualties in terms of both personnel and equipment.

== Defcon Tribe ==
The battalion has an international volunteer unit called Defcon Tribe, composed of foreign volunteers from Estonia, Brasil, Colombia, United States, Italy, Portugal, Spain, South Africa, UK as well as Ukrainian nationals. It has fought throughout the front, most notably in the Black Sea theater of operations.

== Structure ==
- Management & Headquarters
- 1st Platoon
- 2nd Platoon
- Defcon Tribe
- Commandant Platoon
- Support Units
