= Main Directorate of Intelligence (Ukraine) =

Military intelligence service of Ukraine

Main Directorate of Intelligence of the Ministry of Defence of Ukraine
- Головне управління розвідки Міністерства оборони України
- Seal of the HUR

- Emblem of the HUR

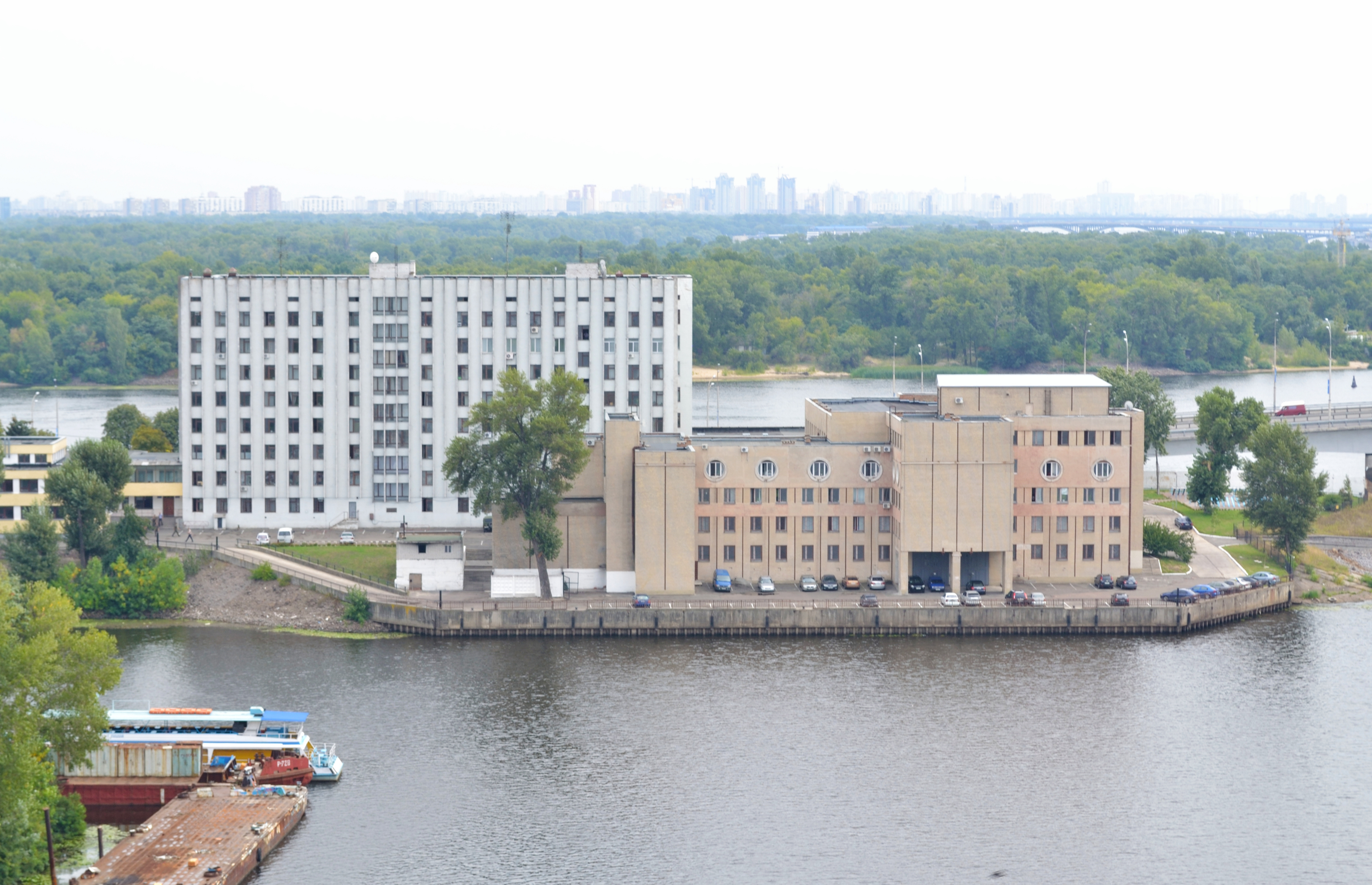
- The HUR buildings on Rybalskyi Peninsula, Kyiv

Agency overview
- Formed: 7 September 1992; 34 years ago
- Preceding agencies: GRU (Soviet Union); Military Strategic Intelligence of MoD
- Jurisdiction: Government of Ukraine
- Motto: Latin: Sapiens dominabitur astris (transl. The wise will rule the stars)
- Employees: Classified
- Annual budget: ₴1 billion
- Agency executive: Oleh Ivashchenko, Lieutenant General
- Parent agency: Ministry of Defence
- Website: gur.gov.ua

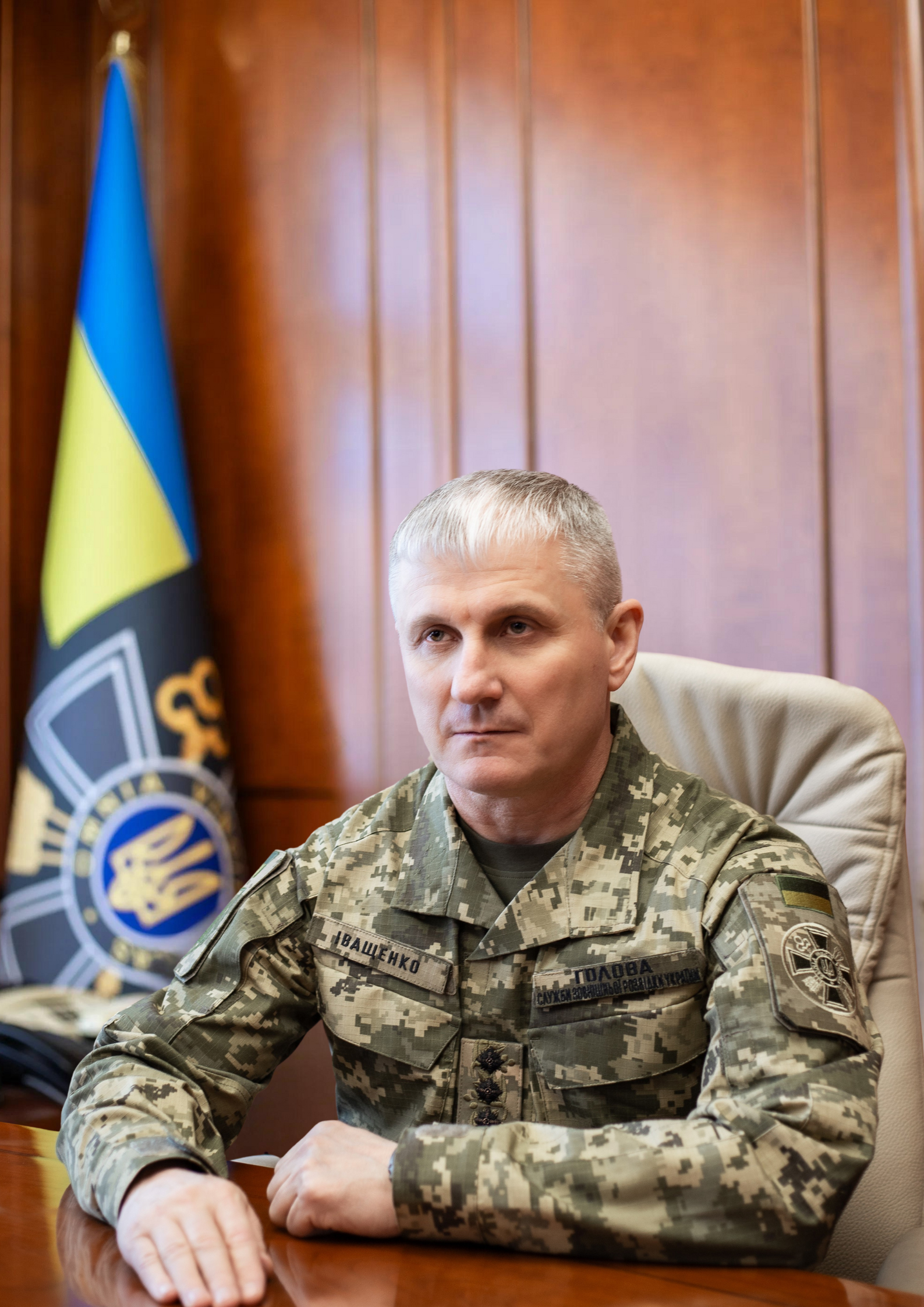
Lieutenant-general Oleh Ivashchenko, HUR chief, in 2025

The Main Directorate of Intelligence of the Ministry of Defence of Ukraine (Ukrainian: Головне управління розвідки Міністерства оборони України, ГУР МОУ, romanized: Holovne upravlinnia rozvidky Ministerstva oborony Ukrainy, GUR / HUR MO), (Note: Also rendered as GUR / HUR MOU.) also known in English as the Defense Intelligence of Ukraine (DIU), is the military intelligence service of the Ukrainian government. It is an agency of the Ministry of Defence, not the General Staff of the Armed Forces of Ukraine.

Similar to the GRU, both its predecessor and Russian counterpart, the HUR is not restricted to intelligence-gathering but also carries out military operations and contains Spetsnaz units under its operational control.

== History ==
The agency was established from the existing intelligence assets of the Kyiv, Odesa and Carpathian military districts of the Soviet Armed Forces and its Main Intelligence Directorate (GRU), following the dissolution of the Soviet Union and the independence of Ukraine.

The Intelligence Directorate of the General Headquarters of the Armed Forces of Ukraine was established in February 1992. Based on a presidential decree issued on 7 September 1992, the Strategic Military Intelligence Directorate of the Ministry of Defence was created. The existence of two separate agencies with similar responsibilities, and reporting to different authorities, hampered the development of an effective military intelligence system.

On 6 July 1993, the Decree of the President of Ukraine ordered the merging of the two agencies to form the Main Military Intelligence Directorate of the Ministry of Defence. It was renamed the Main Intelligence Directorate of the Ministry of Defense of Ukraine, or Defence Intelligence of Ukraine (DIU) for short, on 4 April 1994.

On 22 March 2001, the Ukrainian parliament (Rada) ratified the Law of Ukraine "On Intelligence Agencies of Ukraine". The HUR was given the status of special government authority.

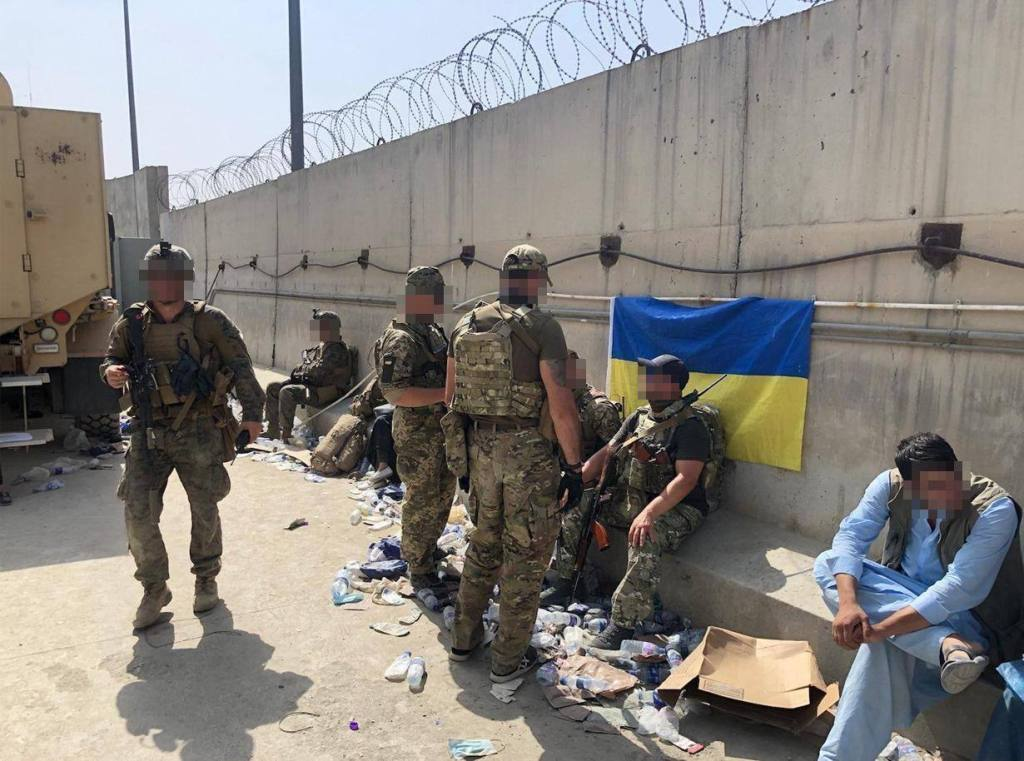
HUR special forces at the 2021 Kabul airlift

On 18 August 2021, HUR special forces moved on Il-76MDs from the 25th Transport Aviation Brigade of the Ukrainian Air Force and flew to Kabul with the mission of evacuating citizens of Ukraine and foreigners during the 2021 Kabul airlift. In total, the aircraft of the brigade made six flights and transported more than 700 citizens of different countries. Special forces went to Kabul three times a day to find and bring citizens who were to be evacuated to the Kabul airport.

In the February of 2022, the ongoing conflict of Ukraine escalated to a full-scale war, leading to Russia's invasion on the 24th of the month. The DIU played an indirect role in events surrounding this invasion by issuing pre-invasion warnings, strengthening defence by coordinating western allies, carrying out covert missions, and influencing the leadership of Ukraine to respond decisively. The DIU prevented the fall of the Ukrainian cities by providing defence over Kyiv and launching counter attacks in Kharkiv.

On 20 September 2023, CNN reported that Ukrainian special forces were likely behind multiple attacks on Wagner-backed Rapid Support Forces (RSF) forces in Sudan, using DJI Mavic 3 and first-person view (FPV) drones. In May 2023, HUR Chief Kyrylo Budanov vowed to "destroy Russian war criminals anywhere in the world, wherever they are." In March 2024, reports confirmed that HUR operators from the "Timur" unit were actively fighting Wagner and RSF in Sudan.

On 30 January 2024, the DIU received a Snatch Land Rover SUV for its personnel from volunteers of the British-Ukrainian society "Driving Ukraine".

On 2 May 2025, a Ukrainian HUR MAGURA V5 naval drone shot down a Russian Su-30 using a R-73 missile, 50 km west of Novorossiysk. The crew of two ended up in the Black Sea, where a civilian ship later recovered them. HUR claimed it was the first time a maritime drone shot down an aircraft.

In April 2026, HUR announced that it had performed two space-launch capability tests during the period under Budanov's leadership, with the first test reaching an altitude of 100 km, and the second launch reaching 204 km.

In June 2026 Forbes reported that following Russia's 2014 invasion began close cooperation with the Central Intelligence Agency, which helped reform the institution weakened by corruption, Russian infiltration and its Soviet-era legacy. The cooperation is reported to be ongoing as of mid-2026, with Ukraine providing its US counterpart with insights into Russia.

== Emblem ==
In 2016, the HUR emblem was changed to an illustration of an owl plunging a sword into Russia. The owl has been said to be a tongue-in-cheek reference to the emblem of the Spetsnaz special forces of the Russian GRU, which depicts a bat - a natural prey of the owl. In addition, the motto "The wise will rule over the stars" (Latin: Sapiens Dominabitur Astris) ostensibly alludes to the GRU's motto "Only the stars are above us" (Russian: Выше нас только звeзды, romanized: Vyshe nas tolko zvyezdy). The new emblem was met with outrage from Russian journalists and politicians, including Dmitry Rogozin, and with some calling it a provocation.

== Spheres of activity ==
The Main Directorate of Intelligence conducts its activity in the military, political, technical, economic, signals, informational and environmental spheres.

The major missions of the directorate are:

- Extracting, analyzing, processing and disseminating information in accordance with the law "On Intelligence"
- Conducting measures aimed at promoting the realization of the national interests of Ukraine
- Identifying external threats to the national security of Ukraine, and conducting measures against such threats
- Participating in the fight against terrorism and other criminal activities that pose a threat to the national security of Ukraine
- Cooperating with foreign intelligence bodies
- Carrying out other activities defined by law to ensure the national security of Ukraine

== Organization ==
The HUR has an executive office and several agency-wide functions, and five major directorates and departments consisting of the following:

Directorates:

- Strategic Intelligence Directorate
- Armed Forces General Staff Intelligence Support Directorate
- Information Support Directorate
- Personnel Policy Directorate
- Logistic Directorate

Departments:

- Internal Security Department
- Planning Department
- Automation and Communication Department
- Economic and Finance Department
- Information and state secret protection Department

=== Combat formations ===
Before the Russian invasion of Ukraine in 2022, the only field reconnaissance unit of the HUR was a special unit subordinated to the Directorate's 4th Special Intelligence Service (4-та Служба спеціальної розвідки):

- 10th Separate Special Purpose Unit (10-й окремий загін спеціального призначення, MUN A2245), based in Rybalskyi Peninsula, Kyiv
  - Battalion HHC
  - 3 operational companies – 1st – 3rd Special Purpose Company (1 – 3 сотня спеціального призначення)

As of 2024, the units subordinate to the HUR include:

Reconnaissance units subordinated to Armed Forces of Ukraine (AFU):

- 23rd Reconnaissance Battalion
- 49th Reconnaissance Training Center
- 52nd Reconnaissance Battalion
- 53rd Reconnaissance Battalion
- 54th Reconnaissance Battalion
- 74th Reconnaissance Battalion
- 120th Reconnaissance Regiment
- 129th Reconnaissance Battalion
- 130th Reconnaissance Battalion
- 131st Reconnaissance Battalion
- 132nd Air Assault Reconnaissance Battalion
- 140th Marine Reconnaissance Battalion
- 143rd Reconnaissance Battalion
- 150th Reconnaissance Strike Battalion
- 151st Reconnaissance Strike Battalion
- 152nd Reconnaissance Battalion

Spetsnaz units under AFU operational control:

- Shaman Battalion
- Special Purpose Unit "Kraken"
- Artan Unit
  - Revanche Tactical Group
- Tymur Special Unit
  - 2nd Special Operations Detachment
  - 6th Special Operations Detachment
  - Bratstvo Battalion
  - NOBODY Battalion
  - Stuhna Battalion
  - Chimera Unit
  - Special Purpose "Aratta" Battalion (formerly the 8th Battalion of the Ukrainian Volunteer Army)
  - Black Winter Group
  - "Paragon Company" Detachment
  - Russian Volunteer Corps
  - Sibir Battalion
  - Special Unit "1514"
  - Belarusian Volunteer Corps
  - Volunteer Reconnaissance Battalion "Sonechko"
  - Special Purpose Unit "Vidar"
- Kabul 9
- Defense Intelligence Aviation
  - Special Purpose UAV Unit "Wings"
- Special Purpose USV Unit "Group 13"
- International Legion of the Defence Intelligence of Ukraine is a specialized unit part of the International Legion and HUR MO, comprising primarily ex-military volunteers from over 50 countries. They have participated in key battles across Ukraine, notably Kyiv, Kharkiv, Mykolaiv, Kherson, Zaporizhzhia, Sievierodonetsk and Bakhmut. The DIU Legion operates with significant autonomy and relies heavily on self-funding for mission essential equipment.
  - Tactical Group "Athena"
  - Ronin Team sniper and reconnaissance company.
- Solidarity Special Unit
- Unit designated as "Khimik"

== Legal basis ==
The Main Directorate of Intelligence is legally allowed to operate based upon the following documents:

- The Constitution of Ukraine
- Law of Ukraine "On the National Security of Ukraine", 1991
- Law of Ukraine "On the Defense of Ukraine", 2018
- Law of Ukraine "On Intelligence", 2020
- Law of Ukraine "On Military Duty and Military Service", 1992
- Law of Ukraine "On Central Bodies of Executive Power", 2011
- Law of Ukraine "On Civil Service", 2015
- Law of Ukraine "On International Treaties of Ukraine", 2004
- Law of Ukraine "On the Fight Against Terrorism", 2003
- Law of Ukraine "On Counter-Intelligence Activities", 2002
- Law of Ukraine "On Operational and Investigative Activities", 1992
- Law of Ukraine "On State Secrets", 1994
- Law of Ukraine "On the Social and Legal Protection of Servicemen and Their Families", 1991
- Presidential Decree "On the National Security Strategy of Ukraine", 2020
- Presidential Decree "On the Military Security Strategy of Ukraine", 2021
- Presidential Decree "On Additional Measures to Further Democratize Society and Strengthen Civil Control Over the Activities of Law Enforcement and Intelligence Agencies of Ukraine", 2004
- Presidential Decree "On Ensuring Control over the Activities of the Armed Forces of Ukraine and Other Military Formations", 2010
- Presidential Decree "On Strengthening Control over the Activities of the Armed Forces of Ukraine and Other Military Formations", 2015
- Presidential Decree "On the Inter-Agency Commission on the Policy of Military-Technical Cooperation and Export Control", 2007
- Presidential Decree "On Certain Issues of Leadership in the Spheres of National Security and Defense", 2008
- Presidential Decree "On the Regulation of Military Service in the Armed Forces of Ukraine by Citizens of Ukraine", 2008

== List of directors ==
No.	Portrait	Name	Took office	Left office	Time in office	Defence branch	Ref.
1	Oleksandr Skipalskyi	Lieutenant General; Oleksandr Skipalskyi (born 1945)	16 October 1992	9 June 1997	4 years, 236 days	Soviet Army	
2	Ihor Smeshko	Colonel General; Ihor Smeshko (born 1955)	9 June 1997	29 September 2000	3 years, 112 days	Ukrainian Ground Forces	
3	Viktor Paliy	Colonel General; Viktor Paliy (born 1949)	29 September 2000	13 March 2003	2 years, 165 days	Armed Forces of Ukraine	
4	Oleksandr Halaka	Colonel; Oleksandr Halaka (born 1955)	13 March 2003	17 January 2008	4 years, 310 days	Armed Forces of Ukraine	
5	Oleksandr Halaka	Colonel; Oleksandr Halaka (born 1955)	13 March 2003	17 January 2008	4 years, 310 days	Armed Forces of Ukraine	
6	Viktor Hvozd	Lieutenant General; Viktor Hvozd (born 1959)	17 January 2008	17 August 2010	2 years, 212 days	Armed Forces of Ukraine	
7	Serhiy Hmyza	Major General; Serhiy Hmyza (born 1960)	17 August 2010	26 February 2014	3 years, 193 days	Armed Forces of Ukraine	
8	Yuriy Pavlov	Major General; Yuriy Pavlov (born 1962)	3 March 2014	28 July 2015	1 year, 147 days	Armed Forces of Ukraine	
10	Valeriy Kondratyuk	Lieutenant General; Valeriy Kondratyuk	28 July 2015	15 October 2016	3 years, 193 days	Foreign Intelligence Service of Ukraine	
11	Vasyl Burba	Major General; Vasyl Burba (born 1978)	15 October 2016	5 August 2020	3 years, 295 days	Armed Forces of Ukraine	
12	Kyrylo Budanov	Lieutenant General; Kyrylo Budanov (born 1986)	5 August 2020	2 January 2026	5 years, 150 days	Armed Forces of Ukraine	
13	Oleh Ivashchenko	Lieutenant General; Oleh Ivashchenko (born 1969)	2 January 2026		269 days	Armed Forces of Ukraine	

== Notable members ==
- Maksym Shapoval †
- Andriy Yusov, the head of public relations

== See also ==
- Foreign Intelligence Service of Ukraine
- Security Service of Ukraine
- Other military intelligence agencies
  - Main Intelligence Directorate of the Russian General Staff (Russian Federation)
  - Direction du Renseignement Militaire (France)
  - Defence Intelligence Agency (India)
  - Strategic Intelligence Agency (Indonesia)
  - Military Intelligence and Security Service (Netherlands)
  - Defence Intelligence and the Intelligence Corps (UK)
  - Defense Intelligence Agency (US)
