= 10th Special Purpose Detachment (Ukraine) =

10th Separate Special Purpose Detachment
- 10-й окремий загін спеціального призначення
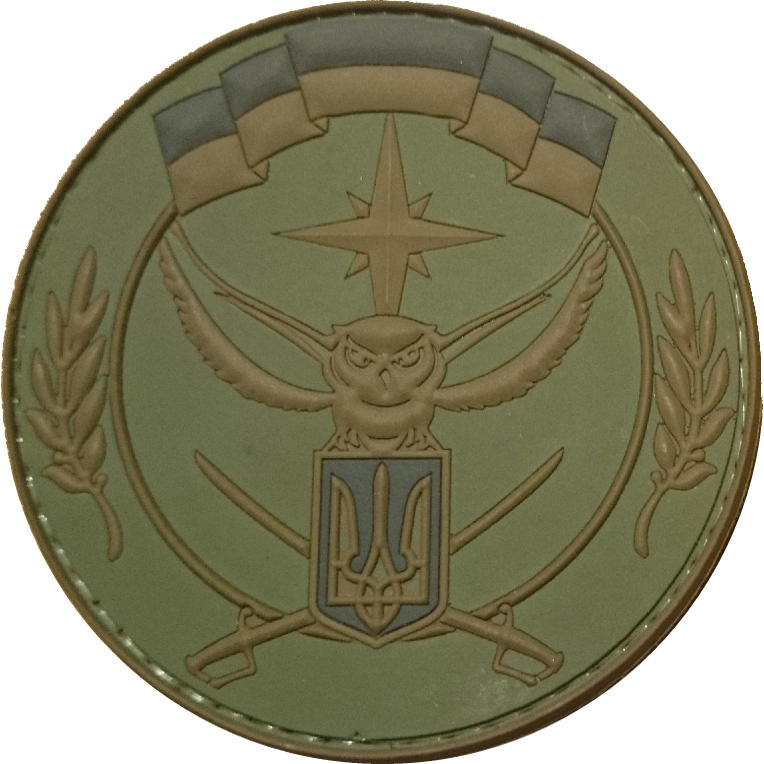
- Insignia
- Founded: September 1993
- Country: Ukraine
- Branch: Main Directorate of Intelligence
- Type: Spetsnaz
- Role: Reconnaissance, counteroffensive and sabotage
- Engagements: War in Afghanistan; 2020–2021 U.S. troop withdrawal from Afghanistan; 2021 Kabul airlift; Piracy off the coast of Somalia; Russo-Ukrainian War; War in Donbas; Russian invasion of Ukraine; Northern Ukraine campaign; Battle of Antonov Airport; Battle of Hostomel; Battle of Kyiv; Battle of Bucha; Battle of Irpin

Commanders
- Notable commanders: Major General Maksym Shapoval

The 10th Separate Special Purpose Detachment "Major General Maksym Shapoval" (Ukrainian: 10-й окремий загін спеціального призначення імені генерал-майора Максима Шаповала, MUN A2245) is a unit of the Main Intelligence Directorate subordinated to the Ministry of Defense of Ukraine. The Battalion is headquartered in Rybalsky Island, Kyiv.

== History ==
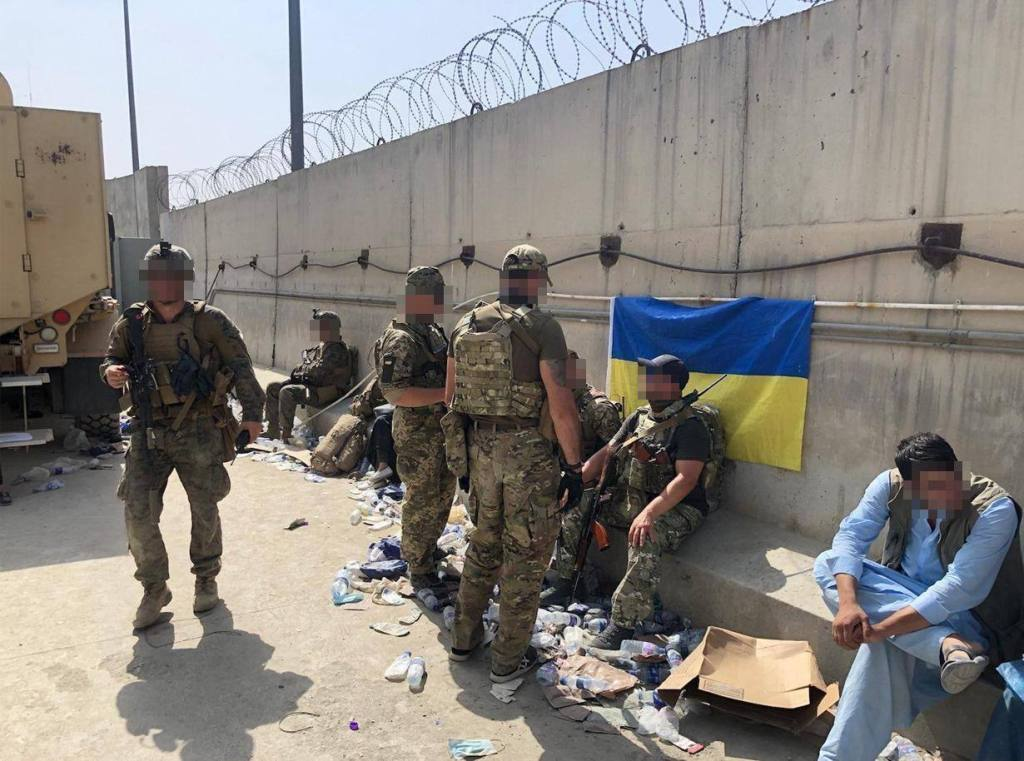
10th SPD special forces in Kabul during the 2021 Kabul airlift.

It was established originally as the military unit A2245, in September 1993 commanded by the veteran and legend of the Soviet-Afghan War, Hero of the Soviet Union Lieutenant Colonel Yaroslav Goroshko.

Before 2022, this was the only unit that could be immediately deployed beyond the borders of Ukraine to protect the interests of Ukraine outside its borders and ensure the security of its citizens outside the country. It was composed exclusively of officers with combat experience and are specially skilled in diving, airborne, and mountain warfare. It was headquartered in Kyiv.

External videos
- 10-й загін спеціального призначення ГУР України

On 25 September 2008, the ship MV Faina was hijacked by approximately 50 Somali pirates calling themselves the Central Regional Coast Guard. The ship was allegedly heading to Mombasa, Kenya, from Ukraine with 33 Soviet-made T-72 tanks, weapons (including rocket-propelled grenades and anti-aircraft guns) and ammunition on board, when it was seized. The pirates said they were unaware of the ship's cargo before they captured it. However, the pirates claim that documents found on board indicate that the arms cargo was destined for Juba, Southern Sudan, instead of Kenya, as originally understood. The detachment delivered ransom to the pirates and the ship was let free.

From the very beginning of the War in Donbas, the detachment has been actively involved in confronting separatist sabotage and reconnaissance groups as well as conducting special operations behind the frontlines. On 30 June 2014, while performing a combat mission, a soldier of the detachment, Kiselev Igor Alexandrovich was ambushed and killed near the village of Kryva Luka by a sniper. On 10 February 2015, Colonel Dovhanyuk Volodymyr Leonidovych of the detachment was killed in the February 2015 Kramatorsk rocket attack. On 16 May 2015, the detachment captured fighters of the 3rd Guards Spetsnaz Brigade near Schastya in coordination with 92nd Assault Brigade who struck a group of 30 Russian servicemen, two members of the DRG, Russian servicemen, Captain Yevgeny Volodymyrovich Erofeyev and Sergeant Alexander Anatolyevich Alexandrov, were wounded and taken prisoner.

It was thanks to them that Ukraine substantiated its position in The Hague about Russia's involvement in armed aggression, and before that, it provided all such documented facts through diplomatic channels and channels of intelligence exchange with allied intelligence agencies.

It carried out reconnaissance deep into the occupied territories and gave information regarding the deployment of Russian artillery, in particular long-range artillery, which significantly reduced Ukrainian casualties. According to a 2024 report by The New York Times, the detachment was trained by CIA and in 2016, conducted an amphibious raid on Russian-occupied Crimea to plant explosives at an airfield. It was ambushed by a Russian commando unit after landing; the Ukrainian force killed several Russian soldiers before retreating to Ukrainian-controlled territory. On 7 June 2017, commander of the Vympel special unit of the Russian FSB, Colonel Yuri Mikhailovich Cherkashin was killed by the detachment. On 24 June 2017, the detachment eliminated a Russian sabotage and reconnaissance group led by Russian Captain Alexander Shcherba, who along with a Russian sniper were killed and four more saboteurs were detained, one of them was a Russian citizen Viktor Ageev, belonging to the 22nd Separate Guards Special Purpose Brigade. On 27 June 2017, at about 8:10 a.m. in the Solomyanskyi district of Kyiv, a powerful explosion occurred in a Mercedes-Benz car driven by the detachment's commander, Colonel Shapoval Maksym Mikhailovich, he was successfully assassinated by separatists and two civilians were wounded. On 7 September 2017, it received the honorary title of "Major General Maksym Shapoval".

On August 18, 2021, an Il-76MD of the 25th Transport Aviation Brigade took off from Boryspil Airport to Kabul carrying the personnel of the detachment with a mission to evacuate citizens of Ukraine and foreigners. They performed 6 flights and evacuated more than 700 citizens of different countries. The operatives of the detachment went to Kabul 3 times per day to find and bring citizens who were subject to evacuation to Kabul Airport.

Following the Russian invasion of Ukraine, the detachment undertook its first operations during the Battle of Kyiv on the first day of invasion.

== Commanders ==
- Lieutenant Colonel Horoshko Yaroslav Pavlovych (1993–1994)
- Colonel Galva Vyacheslav Anatolyevich (?-2010)
- Colonel Shapoval Maksym Mikhailovich (2013-27 June 2017 †)

== Sources ==
- Chuprin K. IN. The armed forces of the CIS and Baltic countries. Directory. — Minsk: "Modern School", 2009. — ISBN 978-985-513-617-1
- СПЕЦНАЗ УКРАЇНИ
- "Про затвердження технічної документації по інвентаризації земельної ділянки в/ч А2245 для будівництва навчально-спортивної бази". arhiv.vyshgorod-rada.gov.ua. Bишгородська міська рада. 2015-03-16. Archived from the original on 2017-06-27.
- памятный нагрудный знак «15 лет в/ч А2245»
- Служба у спецназі ГУР МОУ (таємний острів)
- Генерал-майора Максима Шаповала навічно зараховано до списків військової частини
- "В Киеве готовы к бою 38 профессиональных диверсантов". segodnya.ua. Сегодня. 2007-04-12. Archived from the original on 2017-01-07.
