= Sonechko Battalion (Ukraine) =

- Сонечко
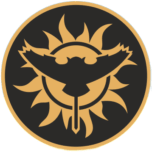
- Battalion insignia
- Founded: 2014
- Country: Ukraine
- Branch: Main Directorate of Intelligence
- Type: Spetsnaz
- Role: Reconnaissance, counteroffensive and sabotage
- Size: Detachment
- Part of: Tymur Special Operations Detachment
- Engagements: Russo-Ukrainian War; War in Donbass; Battle of Bilohorivka; Battle of Avdiivka; Battle of Pisky; Russian invasion of Ukraine; Northern Ukraine campaign; Battle of Kyiv; Battle of Irpin; Battle of Bucha; Eastern Ukraine campaign; 2022 Kharkiv counteroffensive; Battle of Avdiivka; Battle of Bakhmut; Battle of Vovchansk; Southern Ukraine campaign; 2022 Kherson counteroffensive; 2023 Ukrainian counteroffensive

Commanders
- Current commander: Oleksandr (surname unknown)

Insignia
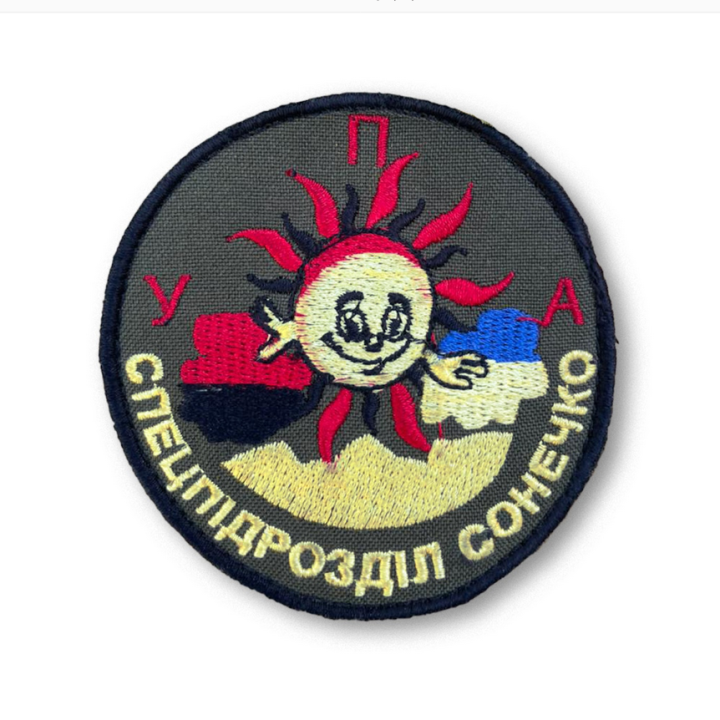
- Former Insignia

The Special Purpose Battalion "Sonechko" is a volunteer special operations unit. One of the spetsnaz units of the Main Directorate of Intelligence, the unit was established in 2014. Composed mostly of volunteers from Zakarpattia Oblast, the unit conducts special reconnaissance, sabotage, and other covert operations. It is a part of Tymur Special Operations Detachment.

== History ==
The battalion started as a self-organized volunteer militia in 2014, following the Russian invasion of Crimea. Its personnel fought in the War in Donbas, such as near Bilohorivka, Avdiivka, Pisky and other areas. It was associated with Right Sector and once skirmished with Ukrainian police in Mukachevo over some disputes in 2015; two personnel of the battalion were killed.

On 24 February 2022, the unit announced full mobilization and set off for Kyiv to partake in the Battle of Kyiv following which it took part in the 2022 Kharkiv counteroffensive and the 2022 Kherson counteroffensive as well as the Battle of Bakhmut and the Battle of Avdiivka. The battalion arrived in Kyiv and took up the duties of conducting mainly sabotage and reconnaissance operations; it struck the Russian Kyiv convoy and conducted recon operations in the Battle of Lyutish, Battle of Irpin and the Battle of Bucha. By late March 2022, the battalion was conducting clearance operations in liberated villages, clearing houses and basements. During one such operation, Russian tanks struck the battalion's forces killing one and wounding several more. During the 2022 Kharkiv counteroffensive, the battalion commander was wounded during an assault on Russian positions near Kozacha Lopan. In August 2022, soldiers of the battalion captured a Russian T-72B tank during an operation in Donetsk Oblast. In September 2022, it was conducting special operations throughout the front. The battalion took part in the 2023 Ukrainian counteroffensive. On 26 June 2023, a soldier of the battalion (Stepan Shapchenko) was killed in combat in Zaporizhzhia Oblast while partaking in the 2023 Ukrainian counteroffensive. In February 2024, the battalion was seeing heavy combat. On 30 May 2024, Russian media reported that four soldiers of the battalion had been taken captive during the Battle of Vovchansk.

== Commanders ==
- Ruslan Kahanets (-2023)
- Oleksandr (surname unknown) (2024-)
