= Battle of Hostomel =

Battle during the Russian invasion of Ukraine

- Part of the northern front of the 2022 Russian invasion of Ukraine
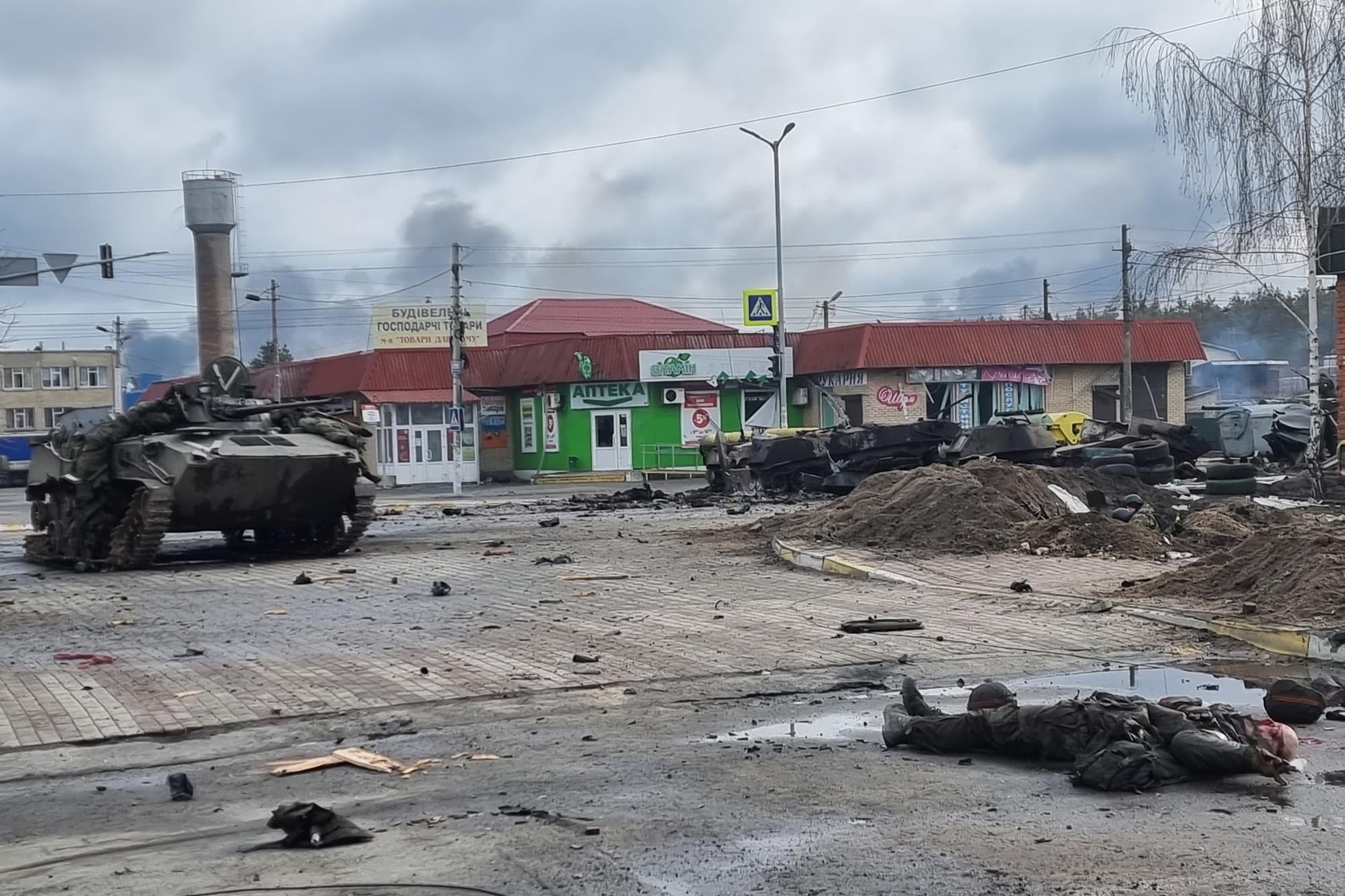
- Russian casualties and damaged armoured vehicles in the aftermath of the battle on 4 March in Hostomel
Date	25 February – 1 April 2022 (1 month and 1 week)
Location	Hostomel, Kyiv Oblast, Ukraine
Result	Ukrainian victory

Belligerents
Russia: Chechnya	Ukraine

Units involved
Russian Armed Forces; Russian Ground Forces; 41st Combined Arms Army; Russian Airborne Forces; 31st Guards Air Assault Brigade; Russian Air Force; National Guard of Russia; Kadyrovites	Armed Forces of Ukraine; Georgian Legion; Special Operations Forces; 3rd Separate Special Purpose Regiment; National Guard of Ukraine: Security Service of Ukraine; Alpha Group (SBU); HUR MOU; Irregular civilian volunteers (militia): Ukrainian guerrillas

During the Russian invasion of Ukraine, a military engagement was fought for control over the town of Hostomel between the Russian and Ukrainian armed forces. As part of an offensive on Kyiv, the Russian forces sought control over Hostomel, Bucha and Irpin in order to encircle and besiege the Ukrainian capital city Kyiv from the west. The Kyiv Oblast State Administration would later name Hostomel, along with Irpin, Bucha, Highway M06, and the northern part of Vyshhorod Raion as the most dangerous places in Kyiv Oblast.

The Russian plans had been to quickly advance on and attack Kyiv, which would have disrupted Ukraine's command and control. Forces sent were insufficient to capture such a large city unless there was a political collapse. While the Russians were able to capture the airport, they were unable to use it to establish an airbridge. The fighting in and around Hostomel has been described as a decisive moment in the early stages of the invasion. It prevented the Russians from quickly taking control of Ukraine. Having failed to achieve their operational objective, in early April the Russian forces not only withdrew from Hostomel, but from all of Kyiv Oblast, as part of what they called a "goodwill gesture".

== Prelude ==
On 24 February 2022, Russian airborne forces arrived via helicopters and battled Ukrainian forces for control of the Hostomel Airport. Ukrainian forces initially evicted the Russian airborne troops from the airport, but were soon engaged by Russian reinforcements. On 25 February 2022, the Russian forces re-captured the Hostomel Airport from the Ukrainians. As a result, the battle shifted from the airport to the nearby town as the Russian forces began to establish a foothold in Hostomel and press their advance.

== Battle ==
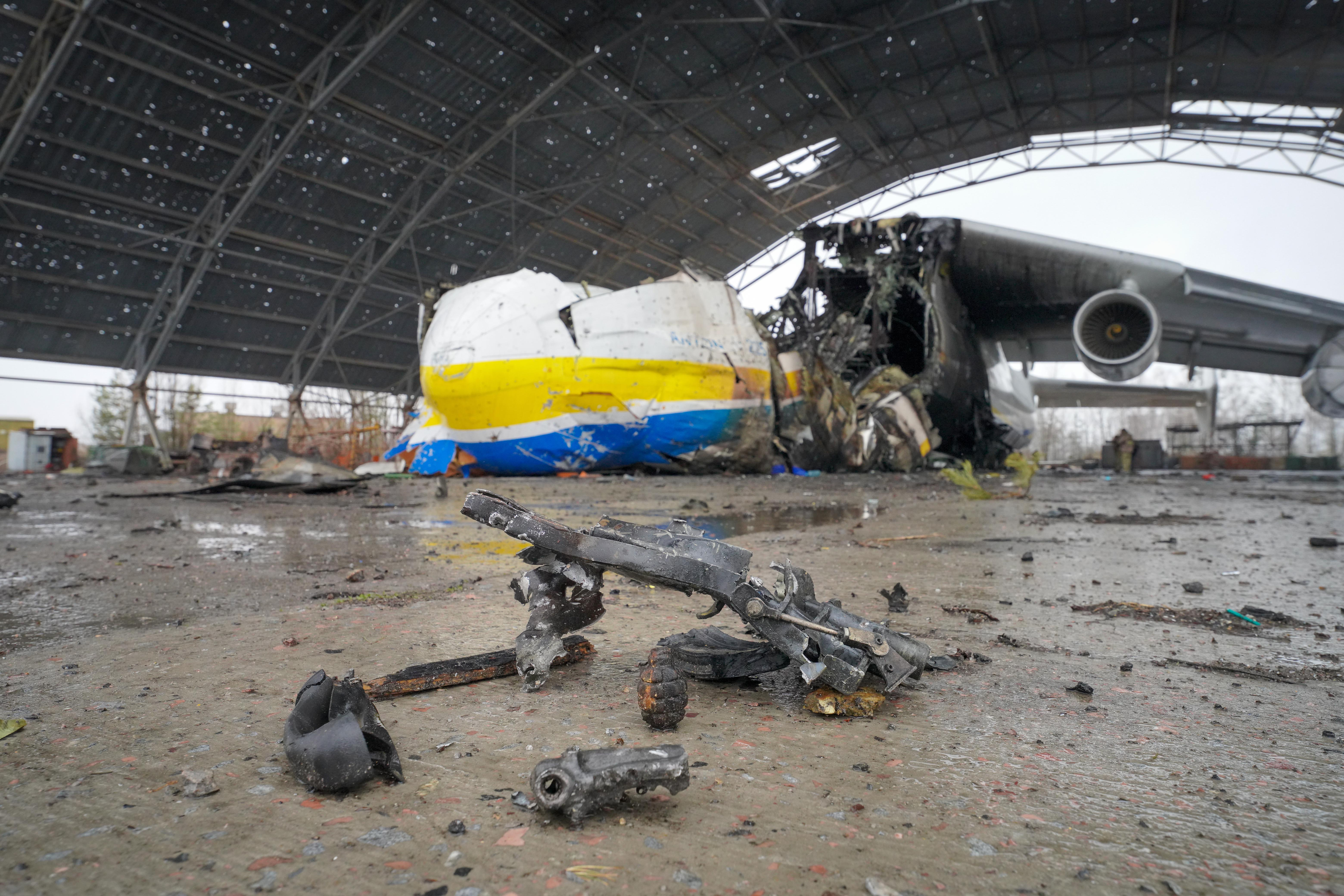
Remains of the Antonov An-225 cargo plane

=== 25–28 February 2022 ===
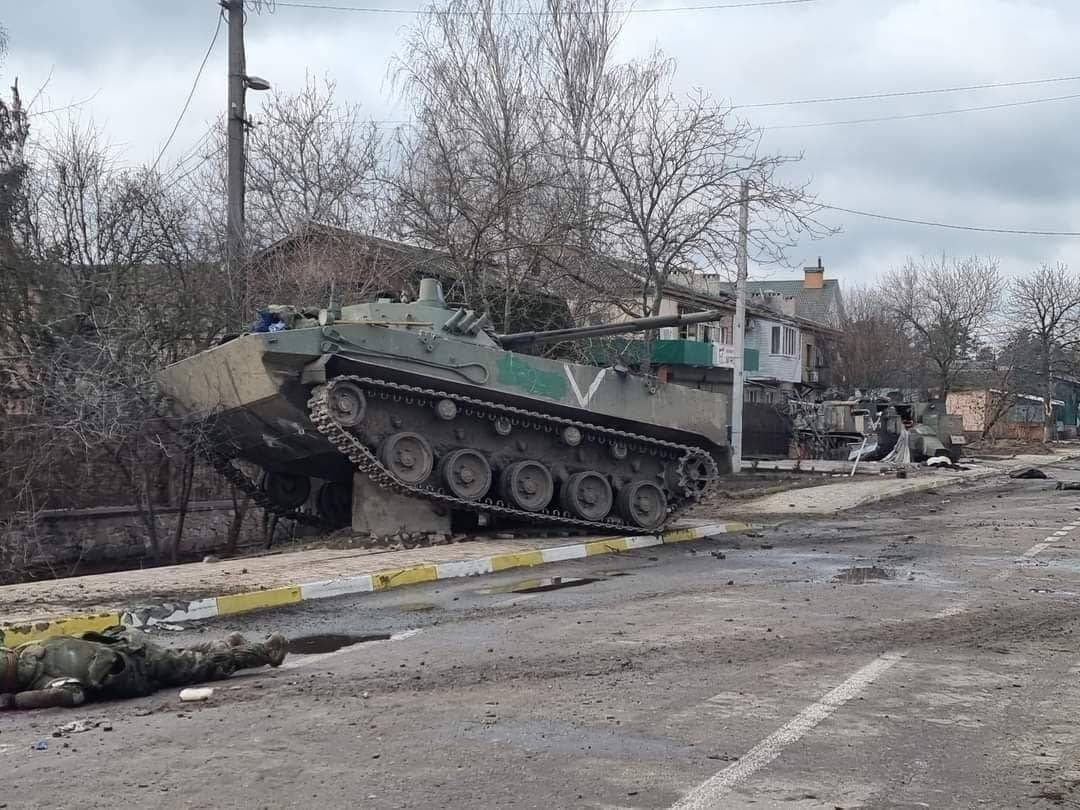
Russian BMD-4 amphibious fighting vehicle stuck on a concrete barrier

Following the battle of the airport, Ukrainian and Russian ground forces began to engage each other in and around Hostomel later. Videos posted on social media showed a Russian tank column burning in the outskirts of the town and Ukrainian Mi-24s firing rockets at Russian positions over a residential area. Kadyrovites were reported to have moved into the outskirts of the town or into the airport in preparations to assassinate the Ukrainian president Volodymyr Zelenskyy. The Security Service of Ukraine reported that the Kadyrovites convoy consisted of over 250 pieces of equipment and more than 1,500 of the "best fighters of the Chechen Republic". Ukrainian intelligence stated they received these reports from elements of the FSB who oppose the invasion. The Irpin Bridge was destroyed on the same day, cutting off Kyiv from its western suburbs.

On 26 February 2022, acting on the earlier intelligence report, Ukrainian forces intercepted and destroyed a Chechen strike group tasked with assassinating President Zelenskyy. Elsewhere, Ukrainian UAVs spotted two locations near Hostomel where the Chechen fighters were assembling. The Ukrainian National Guard and Alpha Group later attacked those locations, destroying a column of Russian armored vehicles in the process. The Ukrainians claimed to have destroyed 56 tanks in the convoy and to have killed hundreds of Chechen fighters in these attacks. Also, according to Ukrainian officials, Magomed Tushayev, a Chechen Lieutenant Colonel and head of the 141st Motorized Regiment of the National Guard of Russia, was killed during the attack. Ukrainian forces reported that the Kadyrovites sustained heavy casualties as a result of these attacks. By 28 February 2022, the Ukrainians had reported that several hundred Chechen fighters had died in Hostomel so far.

=== 1–5 March 2022 ===
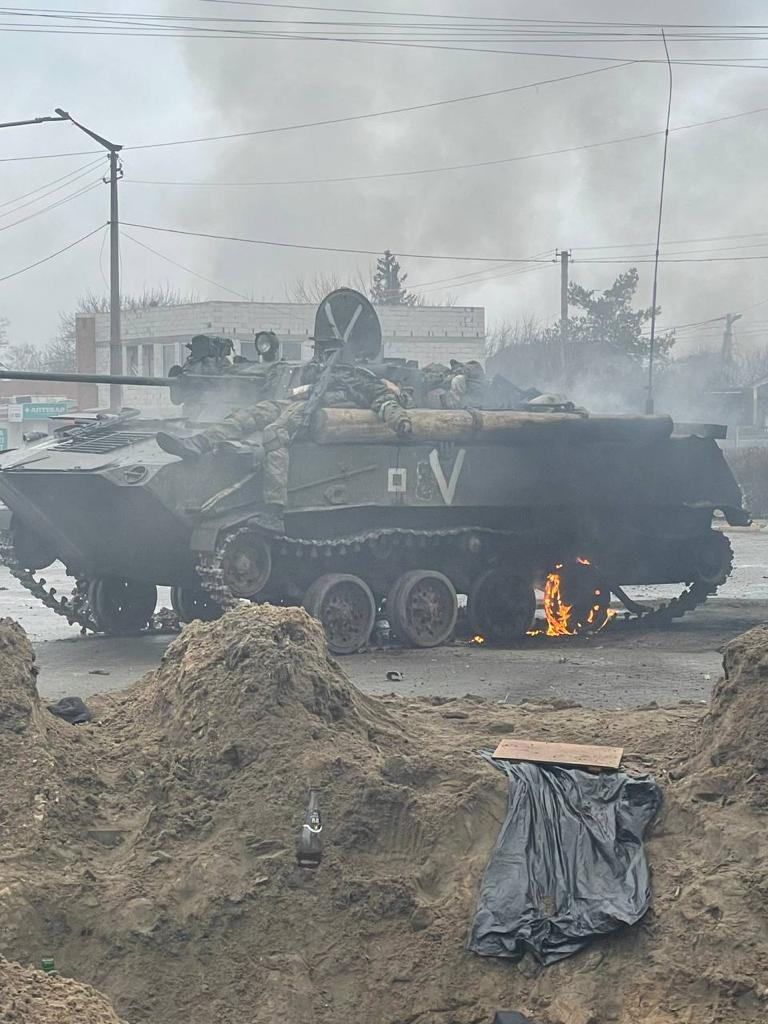
Russian dead lying on top of an incapacitated BMD-2 airborne fighting vehicle

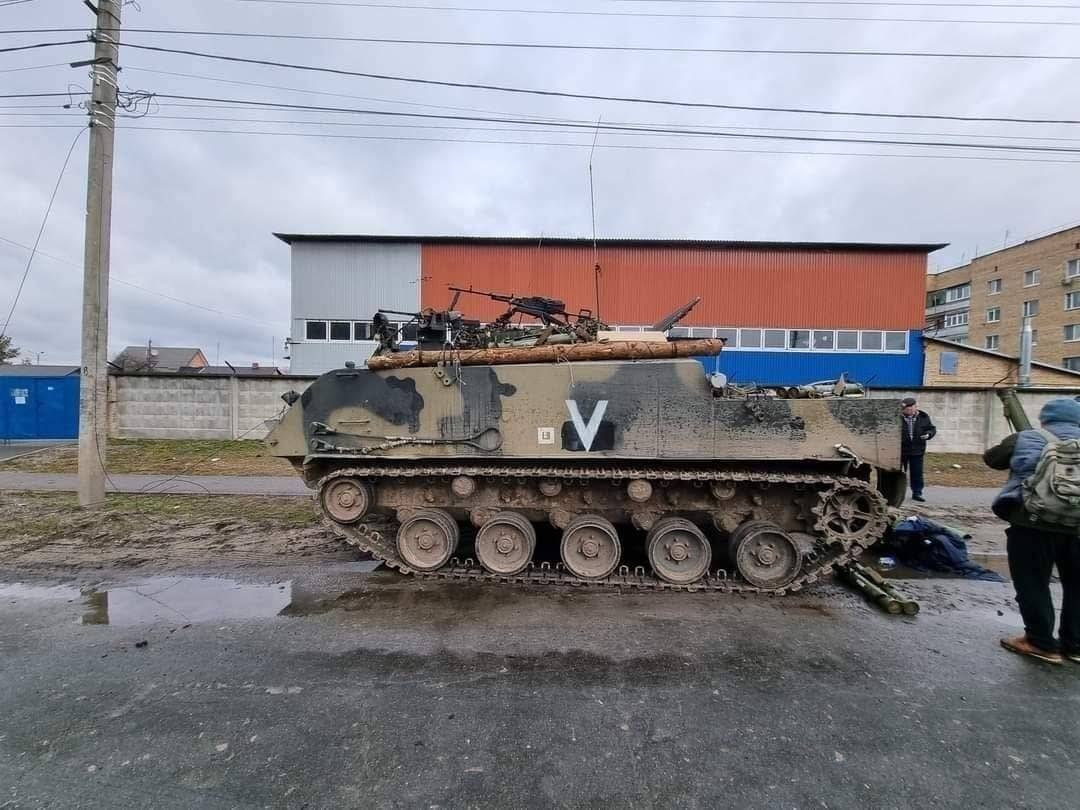
Damaged Russian BTR-MD airborne fighting vehicle

Residents of Hostomel reported constant shelling and airstrikes by Russian forces had deprived them of water, food, electricity, and medicine. The constant bombardment also prevented the residents from receiving humanitarian aid, evacuating from the town, or even removing corpses from the street. Kadyrovites were reported operating closer to the Hostomel Airport and were robbing residents, while Russian soldiers were pressing their advance into Hostomel. Eyewitnesses reported Russian soldiers firing on an ambulance.

On 3 March 2022, Ukrainian forces engaged Russian forces in urban combat inside Hostomel. The Chief Directorate of Intelligence of the Ministry of Defence of Ukraine (GUR MO) reported that special forces under their command and local resistance had destroyed 20 Russian BMDs (likely BMD-2 and/or BMD-4) in Hostomel. Ten of the BMDs were destroyed at 18:30 (6:30 p.m.) near the town's glass factory. The Russian forces were ultimately repelled from the town. A video published on social media depicting the aftermath of the urban battle showed destroyed and abandoned Russian vehicles and dead Russian soldiers sprawled across the streets. A Ukrainian sniper killed Major general Andrei Sukhovetsky either in Hostomel or at the Hostomel Airport. He was the deputy commander of the 41st Combined Arms Army.

On 4 March 2022, Ukrainian forces engaged Russian forces in the streets a second time, reportedly destroying a BMD and bombarding Russian forces with BM-21 Grad rockets. Elsewhere in Hostomel, Ukrainian soldiers defeated a unit of Kadyrovites, seizing their weapons, equipment, and armored vehicle. Ukrainian forces later reported to have regained control of Hostomel from the Russian forces. Ukrainian intelligence reported that the Russian 31st Guards Air Assault Brigade suffered at least 50 dead from the battles in Hostomel. Special forces under the GUR MO, the 3rd Special Purpose Regiment, and local resistance fighters were reported to have taken part in the battle. Russian weapons, equipment, and staff and personal documents were seized by the Ukrainian military, with any usable weapons being redistributed to the local resistance. The GUR MO reported that the deceased Russian soldiers did not possess any identification documents; only vaccination certifications and blank medical books. On the same day, Ukrainian forces reported that Major Valeriy Chybineyev was killed near the Hostomel Airport. Russian forces, reportedly the 31st Guards Air Assault Brigade, later returned into Hostomel and occupied a residential complex, taking 40 or more residents hostage.

Ukrainian journalist Ruslan Vinichenko recounted being held captive by Russian forces beginning on 4 March in an apartment basement with 60 others, while 90 were held in a neighboring building. The soldiers confiscated phones, looted apartments, and spread false information about the war. Residents could only leave the basement to smoke or collect water. On March 10, the soldiers announced plans to move the residents to Belarus. Vinichenko and his girlfriend escaped when a motorist picked them up, with three Russian soldiers observing but not intervening.

On 5 March 2022, Russian forces captured Hostomel and prevented civilians from evacuating the town.

== Ukrainian resistance ==
On 7 March 2022, the mayor of Hostomel, Yuriy Prylypko, along with several other volunteers, were killed by Russian troops while distributing food and medicine to residents. His body was reportedly booby trapped by Russian forces. When the local priest came to pick up his body, a sympathetic Russian soldier stopped the priest from getting close, disarmed the trap, and helped load the mayor's body onto a wheelbarrow to be transported away. Yuriy was buried near the local church with honors. At some point, Ukrainian forces recaptured some parts of Hostomel. Russian forces responded by deploying two battalion tactical groups to Hostomel in preparations for an offensive.

On 8 March 2022, Ukrainian forces repelled a Russian night offensive in Hostomel. It was announced that Ukrainian forces were preparing a large-scale evacuation and humanitarian aid delivery for the residents of Hostomel. The next day, Ukrainian forces conducted a large-scale evacuation across Kyiv Oblast, including in Hostomel. Up to 20,000 civilians were evacuated in the Kyiv Oblast. The evacuation continued into the next day.

On 11 March 2022, residents reported that Russian forces controlled most of Hostomel, making it extremely difficult for civilians to evacuate from the town or receive humanitarian aid. Russian military equipment were moved to the town center and residential areas, while Russian supplies were being delivered via helicopters. Eyewitnesses also reported Kadyrovites roaming around Hostomel and executing civilians for trivial reasons. Still, buses were able to successfully evacuate from the town on 12 March 2022.

On 13 March 2022, Ukrainian forces attacked Russian forces attempting to cross a river outside Hostomel using a pontoon bridge. The bridge and several Russian vehicles were destroyed.

On 14 March 2022, Ramzan Kadyrov, head of the Chechen Republic, claimed to have entered Hostomel. The claim could not be verified at the time of announcement but was met with doubt due to his announcement being broadcast by Russian state medias. Presidential advisor Oleksiy Arestovych also doubted Kadyrov's claim due to information of Kadyrov being seen in Grozny the day before his announcement. During the day, two civilian evacuations were carried in Hostomel. The first column of 10 buses successfully evacuated mothers, children, the elderly, and the disabled out of Hostomel. The second column of four buses were shelled by Russian mortars. One woman was killed and two men were injured from the attack.

On 16 March 2022, Ukrainian forces launched a series of counter-offensives against Russian forces around Kyiv, including some villages near Hostomel. According to Andriy Nebitov, the head of the Kyiv region police, Ukrainian forces were able to break through Russian positions after conducting artillery strikes. He further claimed the counterattack disrupted the Russian forces' plan to attack Kyiv directly.

== Russian withdrawal ==
On 1 April 2022, Oleksandr Pavlyuk, the head of the Kyiv Regional Military Administration, claimed that Russian forces had left Hostomel. On 2 April 2022, the whole of Kyiv Oblast, in which Hostomel is located, was declared free of Russian Military by the Ukrainian Ministry of Defense after Russian troops had left the area. The withdrawal of the last Russian forces from Kyiv Oblast was confirmed on 6 April.

On 28 September 2022, the Prosecutor General of Ukraine and National Police of Ukraine published CCTV footage showing OMON and Rosgvardiya soldiers shooting at civilians in Hostomel during the battle.

In April 2023, Ukrainian Defence Minister Oleksii Reznikov stated that prior to the invasion, he was supposed to go to an MoD command post located in Hostomel, but the plans were cancelled and his team was not captured.
