= Yurii Havrylyshyn =

Ukrainian military officer and public figure

- Юрій Іванович Гаврилишин
- Born: 25 February 1994 (age 32); Illintsi, Sniatyn Raion, Ivano-Frankivsk Oblast, Ukraine
- Education: Hetman Petro Sahaidachnyi National Army Academy
- Military career
- Allegiance: Ukraine
- Branch: National Guard of Ukraine
- Rank: Lieutenant Colonel
- Nickname: "Milan" («Мілан»)
- Units: 10th Mountain Assault Brigade; 3rd Assault Brigade; 12th Special Purpose Brigade "Azov"; 1st National Guard Corps "Azov"
- Commands: Head of Recruitment Center, 1st National Guard Corps "Azov"
- Conflicts: Russo-Ukrainian War; War in Donbas; Battle of Marinka; Battle of Ilovaisk; Shyrokyne standoff; Russian invasion of Ukraine; 2022 Kherson counteroffensive; Battle of Bakhmut
- Awards: For the Defense of Ukraine; Medal for Military Service to Ukraine

Yurii Ivanovych Havrylyshyn (Ukrainian: Юрій Іванович Гаврилишин; born 25 February 1994), known by the call sign "Milan" («Мілан»), is a Ukrainian military officer and public figure. Serving as a lieutenant colonel in the National Guard of Ukraine, he heads the recruitment center of the 1st National Guard Corps "Azov" and founded the cadet-and-officer community "SLON FM".

== Early life and military career ==
Havrylyshyn was born on 25 February 1994 in the village of Illintsi, Sniatyn Raion (now Kolomyia Raion), Ivano-Frankivsk Oblast. After graduating from secondary school, he studied paramedicine at a medical college in Kolomyia before moving to Milan, Italy, to study and work.

Following the outbreak of the Revolution of Dignity in 2014, Havrylyshyn returned to Ukraine, took part in the protests in Kyiv, and joined the volunteer Azov Battalion, earning the call sign "Milan". During the War in Donbas, he fought in the Battle of Marinka, the Battle of Ilovaisk, the Shyrokyne standoff, and near Popasna.

In 2017, he signed a contract with the 10th Mountain Assault Brigade and later enrolled at the Hetman Petro Sahaidachnyi National Army Academy in Lviv, transferring from artillery reconnaissance to moral and psychological support. While studying there in 2020, he founded "SLON FM", a cadet-and-officer online community advocating transparency and reform in Ukrainian military education.

Following the start of the Russian invasion of Ukraine in February 2022, Havrylyshyn graduated early and was assigned to the 1129th Anti-Aircraft Missile Regiment before transferring to the 3rd Assault Brigade, where he held senior moral and psychological support roles during the 2022 Kherson counteroffensive and the Battle of Bakhmut.

In May 2023, he returned to the12th Special Purpose Brigade "Azov", becoming head of its recruitment center in August 2024 and later taking charge of the recruitment center for the newly formed 1st National Guard Corps "Azov". In this role, he advocated digitalizing medical commission referrals to prevent territorial recruitment centers from intercepting voluntary enlistees, and emphasized peer recommendations and updated combat engineering training as primary drivers of unit recruitment.

== Advocacy and views ==
On 13 March 2023, Havrylyshyn submitted a public petition to the President of Ukraine calling for cadets at higher military educational institutions to be granted the pay and legal status of contract service members during martial law. Following an official response from President Volodymyr Zelenskyy in January 2025, the Cabinet of Ministers of Ukraine adopted Resolution No. 455 on 11 April 2025, increasing cadet financial allowances.

Havrylyshyn (center) with Azov soldiers on a captured Russian tank near the Serebriansky forest, April 2024

In media commentary, Havrylyshyn promotes human-centric military management, reducing bureaucracy in officer training, and preparing Ukrainian society for long-term defense readiness modeled in part on Israel's defense framework.

== Awards ==
- For the Defense of Ukraine (2022)
- Medal for Military Service to Ukraine (16 October 2024)

== Sources ==
- Khodorovskyi, Danylo (2025). "Kursantski spilnoty yak aktyvni uchasnyky hromadianskoho suspilstva". Teoriia ta praktyka suchasnoi yurysprudentsii (in Ukrainian). Vol. 2. Kharkiv. pp. 623–625.
