= 27th Pechersk Brigade =

27th Separate Pecherska Brigade
- 27-ма окрема бригада НГ (Ukrainian)
- Brigade Insignia
- Founded: 2006
- Country: Ukraine
- Allegiance: Ministry of Internal Affairs
- Branch: National Guard of Ukraine
- Type: Brigade
- Role: See #Tasks
- Part of: National Guard of Ukraine; 12th Army Corps
- Garrison/HQ: Pechersk
- Nickname: Pecherska
- Engagements: Russo-Ukrainian war: War in Donbas; Siege of Sloviansk; Battle of Debaltseve; Battle of Mariupol; Russian invasion of Ukraine; Northern Ukraine campaign; Battle of Kyiv; Eastern Ukraine campaign

Commanders
- Current commander: Colonel Dmytro Tsymbal

Insignia
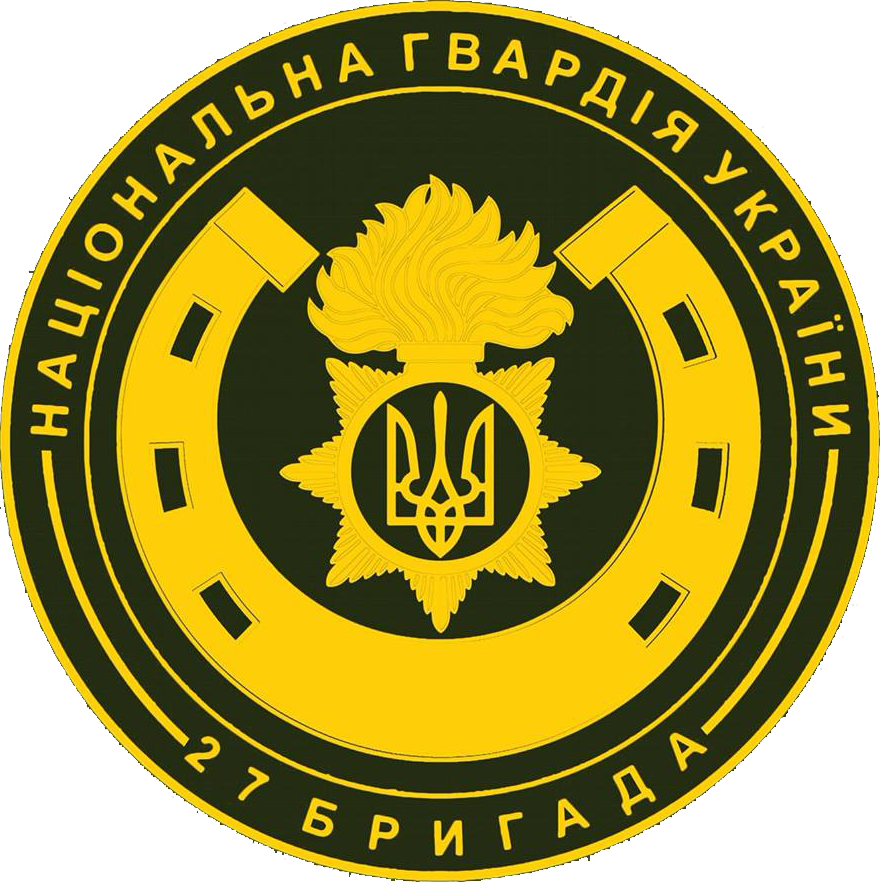
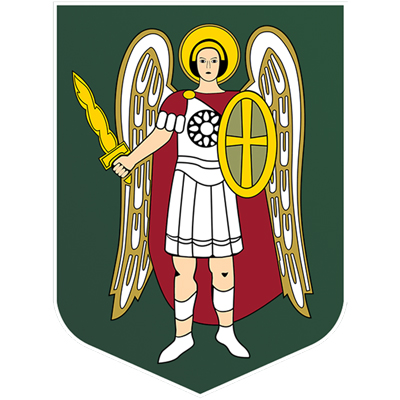
- Former Insignia

The 27th Separate "Pecherska" Brigade' is a brigade of the National Guard of Ukraine tasked with the transport and escort of soldiers and prisoners and the protection of the judicial facilities and Ukrainian territorial integrity. It was established in 2006 and is headquartered in Pechersk, Kyiv.

== History ==
It was established in 2006 on the basis of a disbanded Separate Convoy Brigade, as the 48th regiment of the Internal Troops of Ukraine tasked mainly with phasing convicts into courts and prisons.

In 2009, the 48th regiment was merged with some other transport units being reformed into a brigade.

In 2014, the regiment became a part of the National Guard of Ukraine. In April 2014, the 1st operational reserve battalion "Major General Serhiy Kulchytskyi" of National Guard of Ukraine, became a part of the brigade. The brigade took part in the Siege of Sloviansk during which on 24 May 2014, separatists launched an armed attack on the checkpoint of the National Guard on the eastern outskirts of Sloviansk, near the intersection of the roads to Krasny Liman and Kramatorsk, the engagement lasted 2 hours involving the use of mortars and grenade launchers in addition to small arms during the engagement a soldier of the brigade (Zinchyk Stanislav Mykhailovych) was killed and some personnel were wounded as well. On 28 August 2014, during the Battle of Debaltseve, the retreating convoy including that of the brigade was ambushed by separatists killing five soldiers (Fedir Valeriyovych Ukharskyi, Andrii Ivanovych Tyshchenko, Mykola Mykolayovych Matvienko, Kurmashev Oleksiy Vasyliovych and Doga Oleg Vyacheslavovych) of the brigade and wounding 19 more. (Note: The personnel belonged to the Separate Battalion) On 2 September 2014, it was reformed again into the 27th brigade. The brigade performed combat support operations during the Battle of Mariupol during which on 5 September 2014 separatists attacked a column of Ukrainian forces arriving to Mariupol, near Boikivske, a soldier of the brigade (Oleksandr Ivanovych Zvinnyk) was killed in the attack and another soldier (Eremenko Viktor Viktorovych) who was severely wounded died soon after on 11 September. On 1 October 2014, in Debaltseve a soldier of the Brigade (Kononovych Ivan Mykolayovych) got himself into a landmine explosion killing him and wounding two other soldiers.

On 5 January 2015, a bus of the brigade suffered an accident while travelling from Sloviansk to Bakhmut. 13 soldiers of the brigade (Skrut Rostyslav Stefanovych, Maxim Yuriyovych Shchipov, Panteleimon Petrovych Rozhanskyi, Didach Ihor Yosypovych, Roman Mykhailovych Sokach Volodymyr Anatoliyovych Matkivskyi, Malyuta Roman Volodymyrovych, Linyvenko Yury Volodymyrovych, Ihor Valentynovych Kaplunenko, Roman Valentinovych Zubchuk, Burka Victor Pavlovich, Gerasimyuk Taras Pavlovich and Serhiy Ihorovych Babichev) and further wounding 21 personnel. On 9 January 2015, while performing a combat mission near the Siverskyi Donets River, a battalion of the brigade was ambushed, in the ensuing two-hour battle, the attack was repulsed by backup from the other units of the National Guard and Armed Forces of Ukraine, during the battle a soldier of the brigade (Roman Ivanovych Lagno) was killed and 14 more were wounded. Then, in January 2015, the brigade received new tasks to prevent the crossing of the Transnistrian portion of the Moldovan border to prevent infiltration by sabotage and reconnaissance groups and "illegal" separatist formations. On 23 August 2015, the brigade was presented with a Combat Flag.

In order to protect the bodies and institutions of the Ukrainian judicial system and implement the authorized access systems for them, at the end of 2017, the 4th rifle battalion was created to safeguard 35 judicial facilities in the city of Kyiv. The 1st operational reserve battalion "Major General Serhiy Kulchytskyi" was transferred to the 1st Presidential Operational Brigade.

In 2019, the 22nd separate battalion was established in Chernihiv on the basis of the 3rd battalion of the brigade.

On 23 August 2020, the 27th Brigade received the honorary name of "Pecherska".

During the Russian invasion of Ukraine, the brigade saw combat during the Battle of Kyiv where a soldier of the brigade (Oleksandr Vasyliovych Bybyk) was killed on 18 March 2022. Then it was deployed to Luhansk Oblast to take part in the Eastern Ukraine campaign.

== Tasks ==
The main tasks of the brigade are:

- Convoying, extradition and protection of prisoners in peacetime and soldiers in wartime
- Security for 10 judicial institutions, 4 regional appeal courts and the Kyiv appeal court.

== Personnel ==
The brigade has around 250 personnel, of which 120 are for the protect of judicial facilities, 56 are counterterrorism and counterinsurgent, 40 are special propose, and 11 are extradition guards and 15 transportation guards.

== Structure ==
The structure of the brigade is as follows:

- 1st Rifle Battalion
- 2nd Rifle Battalion
- 4th Rifle Battalion (specifically tasked with protection of state judicial facilities)

== Commanders ==
- Colonel Konstantin Rykhtyk (2017-?)
- Colonel Dmytro Tsymbal(?-)

== Sources ==
- У військовій частині 3066 Національної гвардії України відбулись урочисті заходи з нагоди Дня вшанування учасників бойових дій на території інших держав
- Військова частина 3066 10 років на сторожі правопорядку
- Почесні найменування присвоєно 27 бригаді та 9 полку НГУ
