= 1st Serhii Kulchytskyi Battalion =

1st Operational Battalion named after the Hero of Ukraine Serhii Kulchytskyi
- 1-й оперативний батальйон імені Героя України Сергія Кульчицького (Ukrainian)
- Battalion Insignia
- Founded: 2014
- Country: Ukraine
- Allegiance: Ministry of Defence
- Branch: National Guard of Ukraine
- Type: Battalion
- Part of: Lubart Brigade
- Garrison/HQ: Novi Petrivtsi
- Nickname: Maidan Guardsmen
- Patron: Serhii Kulchytskyi
- Engagements: Russo-Ukrainian war: War in Donbas; Russian invasion of Ukraine

Insignia
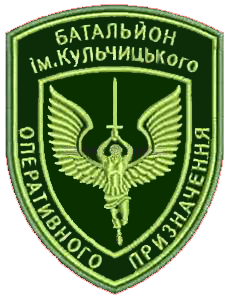
- Former Insignia

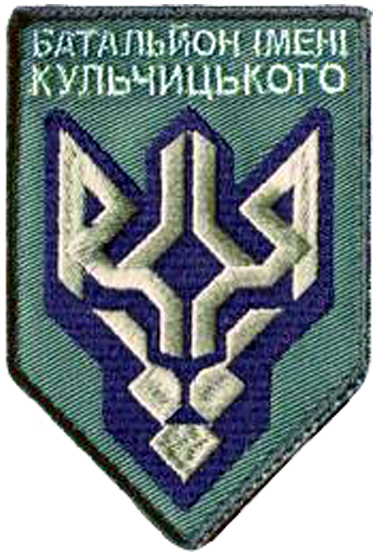
- Former Insignia

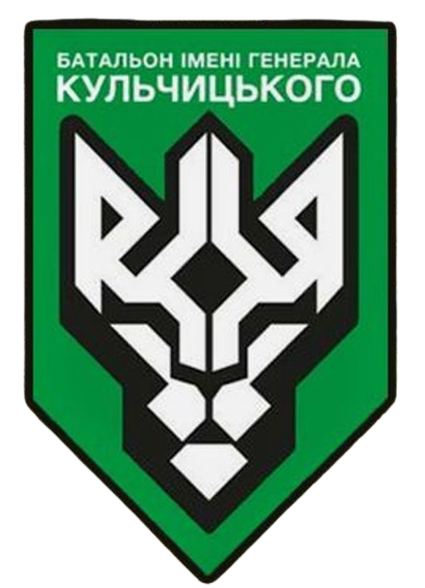
- Former insignia

The 1st Operational Battalion named after the Hero of Ukraine Serhii Kulchytskyi is a volunteer battalion of the 1st Presidential Brigade, a part of the Offensive Guard of the National Guard of Ukraine. It is an all-volunteer battalion with its personnel being the former members of Maidan Defense and other paramilitary groups established by the Ukrainian opposition during the Revolution of Dignity. It was established in 2014 and is garrisoned at Novi Petrivtsi. It is a highly combat-effective formation and has seen heavy combat during both the War in Donbas and the full-scale war after the 2022 Russian invasion of Ukraine.

== History ==
=== 2014 ===
On 14 March 2014, about 500 volunteers from Maidan Self-Defense became reservists of the newly established National Guard of Ukraine, and went to Novi Petrivtsi and started training at the headquarters of the former Bars Regiment as the 1st Reserve Battalion. The training and coordination was directly managed by Major General Serhii Kulchytskyi, commander of the National Guard and Andriy Antonyshchak from the Maidan Defense Headquarters.

It was a scary time. Crimea was destroyed, new cities were captured in Donetsk region every day. I came to Novi Petrovka every day and we solved some urgent issues, and there were many of them. To Kulchytskyi's credit, he was not only a good soldier, not only a good psychologist, but also a very good householder. Imagine for a moment. Several hundred Maidan residents come to the training ground, the vast majority of whom survived the events of February 18–20. They hate cops with every fiber of their soul. And here is the base of "Bars", which stood opposite us. And here the commanders are cops. ... There was something terrible in the first days. The commanders of "Bars" walked step by step and watched over theirs, and we watched over ours. The base is the same. Well, let them sleep in the barracks, and ours in tents. But there is only one toilet. Dining room - one. How do you divide it? It seemed that they were killing themselves. The people of Maidan shouted: "The cops are bad, we will tear you apart." They answered no less "gently": "You are the underdogs from Hrushevsky"! There were isolated incidents, which were immediately suppressed. And the merit of General Kulcytsky cannot be overestimated in this... This can now be taken more or less calmly. And then all the wounds were still open. We continued to bury our brothers, searched for the missing in forests, morgues and hospitals. But the problem was solved. Partly by persuasion, partly by delivering correct information

In Novi Petrivtsi, the personnel were trained for hand-to-hand and street combat tactics in addition to training with automatic weapons, submachine guns, sniper rifles, hand machine guns and large-caliber machine guns, grenades and offensive and defensive maneuvers. The platoon commander of the 1st reserve battalion Oleksandr Wendyuk stated:

The main thing is that we learned to act as one unit. We went through the battles on the Maidan and were united even then. And now, when we have learned the tactics, we feel that we are invincible.

Three Lviv businessmen presented the battalion with a BRDM-2. On 5 April 2014, 300 reservists of the 1st reserve battalion took the oath of loyalty to Ukraine and became a part of the 27th Perchersk brigade. Then the Battalion went to Pavlograd and then to Izium to take part in the Siege of Sloviansk during which on 9 May 2024, a soldier of the brigade (Ihor Volodymyrovych Geisun) was killed in his vehicle by separatists. Soon, Andriy Parubiy called on "patriotic citizens" to join the second volunteer battalion of the NSU:

The first battalion of the National Guard, formed from Maidan Self-Defense, is participating in the anti-terrorist operation in Sloviansk and Kramatorsk. Reserves are required. Recruitment for the second reservist battalion of the National Guard on a reservist contract or permanent basis has been announced. It is necessary to be 18-50 years old, without a criminal record or with an exonerated one, to pass a medical examination.

By 16 May, 270 volunteers had arrived for the creation of the 2nd battalion under the coordinator Andriy Tiron, who completed their training and took oath and we to the ATO zone to take part in the Battle of Kramatorsk and Siege of Sloviansk. Popular Ukrainian media personality, Leonid Kanter mentioned about the Battalion as:

Then gradually everything became clear, we figured out where everything is, got used to the "four after four" schedule - four hours you are "in the outfit", four hours you are free. Day and night mixed. In those four hours between outfits, you had to eat, wash, wash, sleep, and clean your weapons. You choose two or three tasks from this to do, the rest for the next four hours. Plus, during those four hours, there are combat alarms, during which you "blow up" and run no matter where and in what you are... .

On 24 May 2014, during the Siege of Sloviansk, separatists launched an armed attack on the checkpoint of the National Guard on the eastern outskirts of Sloviansk, near the intersection of the roads to Krasny Liman and Kramatorsk, the engagement lasted 2 hours involving the use of mortars and grenade launchers in addition to small arms during the engagement a soldier of the battalion (Zinchyk Stanislav Mykhailovych) was killed and some personnel were wounded as well. The battalion also received high support from right-wing and ultranationalist parties with Ukrainian National Alliance stating:

All of Ukraine is represented in our military unit. These are the people who stood the Maidan. Among them are many Volhynians, in particular from the "Volynska sich" hundred. And the chaplain of the battalion, Father Makariy, is from Lutsk. Apparently, it would be dishonest, even in front of oneself, to sit at home now and do everyday things. We went to fight, because it is our time

Bohdan Balbuza, remarked about the battalion as:

However, there is already a feeling that we are close to victory. Earlier "Glory to Ukraine! Glory to the heroes!" sounded only in the nationalist environment, and now it can be heard from the President and members of the government, and from the smallest children and schoolchildren. Stepan Bandera dreamed that there would be a time when one would say "Glory to Ukraine" and a hundred thousand would continue "Glory to the heroes!". And his dream came true.

Soon, General Kulchytsky also went to Siege of Sloviansk operating and monitoring the battalion before his death in an aircraft shoot down on 29 May on Mount Karachun after working alongside the battalion for over a month. On 31 May 2014, the 1st Reserve Battalion came back to its garrison for replenishment and rest. On 5 July 2014, Chief of Staff of the 2nd Reserve Battalion, Andriy Ivchenko, stated:

I went almost to the center of the city with intelligence. We removed the Russian tricolor from the central barricade of Sloviansk and raised our Ukrainian flag with the inscription Second Battalion.

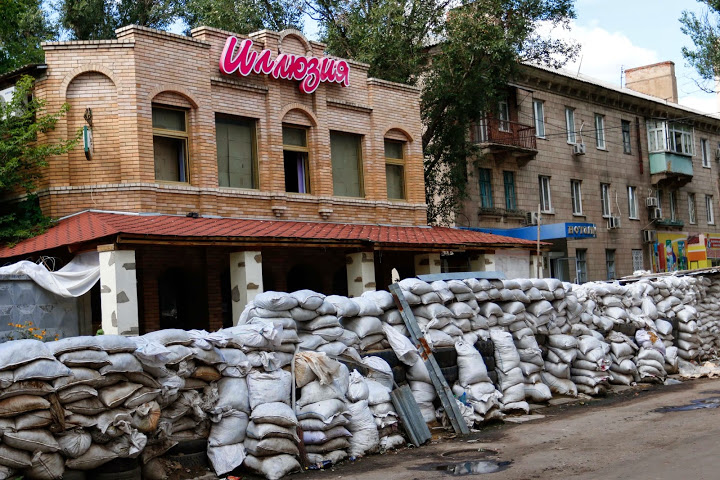
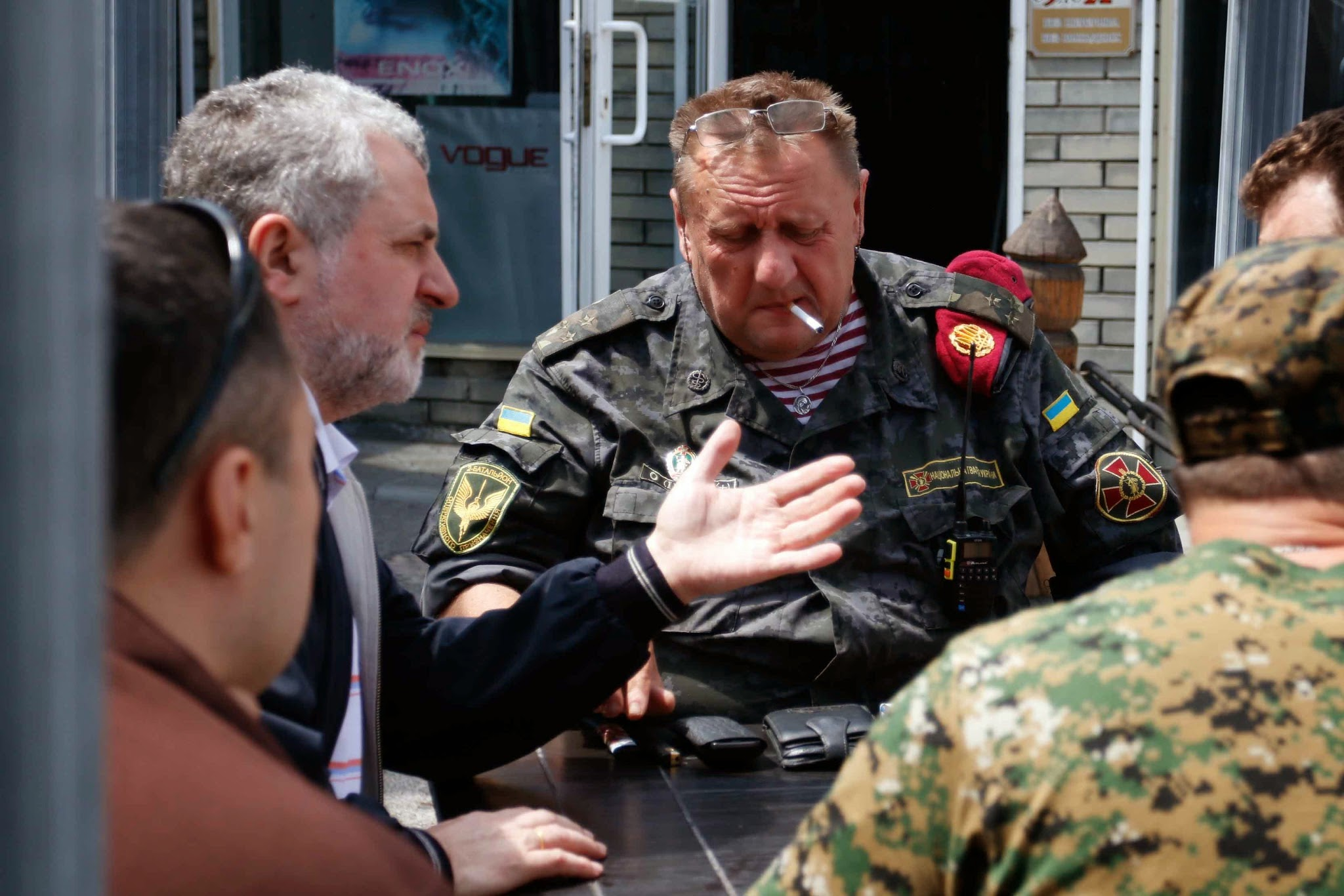
The Battalion's personnel operating in the Captured Sloviansk on 9 July 2014

Roman B. of the 2nd reserve battalion stated that:

Everything is gutted, the roads have huge potholes from the explosions. Some areas of the city were completely destroyed. In addition, the city is mutilated by fortifications built by terrorists - for this they used not only prisoners, but also heavy construction equipment.

Also following the Siege of Sloviansk, on 26 June 2014, during the announced "ceasefire", the separatists using tanks and mortars attacked the checkpoint No. 1, during the first minutes of the battle, two armored personnel carriers of the paratroopers of the 95th Airmobile Brigade were hit killing a paratrooper, during the battle a soldier of the battalion (Gulyk Artur Yaroslavovych) was killed and five more wounded. One of the three tanks of the National Guardsmen was destroyed, and a soldier of the battalion successfully hit a separatist tank and then another soldier Serhii Sidorin of the battalion completely destroyed it using an RPG-7. Ultimately separatists captured the position but Ukrainians launched a counterattack and captured it the next day. In July 2014, the 1st and 2nd Battalions joined and formed an operational battalion named after the Hero of Ukraine Major General Serhii Kulchytskyi, called as the "Kulchytskyi Battalion" with Andriy Antonyshchak stating:

... 155 and 170 soldiers of the 1st and 2nd battalions, respectively, who had already visited the ATO zone, arrived in Novy Petrivka, where the National Guard base is located. This is the vast majority of those who have already participated in hostilities. Of course, those undergoing treatment after being wounded could not come... The name of General Kulchytskyi is sacred to the Guardsmen. The boys rush into battle and are ready to take revenge on the occupiers for his death, for the death of their brothers and to finally cleanse our land of the separatist contagion.

When the 1st and 2nd battalions were established, they received small arms but after the events during the Battle of Ilovaisk in August 2014, the battalion received armored personnel carriers, infantry fighting vehicles and heavy infantry weapons. On 28 August 2014, during the Battle of Debaltseve, the retreating convoy including that of the brigade was ambushed by separatists killing five soldiers (Fedir Valeriyovych Ukharskyi, Andrii Ivanovych Tyshchenko, Mykola Mykolayovych Matvienko, Kurmashev Oleksiy Vasyliovych and Doga Oleg Vyacheslavovych) of the brigade and wounding 19 more. In August 2014, Arsen Avakov stated that ten thousand law enforcement officers were engaged in the ATO zone including volunteers such as those of the battalion. Andrii Antonyshchak noted:

We have done one part of our work. For us, this is a continuation of the Maidan. The barricades have simply moved into the Donetsk region. Soon they will move to the borders of Russia.

In August–September 2014, the personnel of the battalion took part in the Battle of Debaltseve. The battalion also performed combat support operations during the Battle of Mariupol during which on 5 September 2014 separatists attacked a column of Ukrainian forces arriving to Mariupol, near Boikivske, and a soldier of the Battalion (Eremenko Viktor Viktorovych) who was severely wounded during the attack died soon after on 11 September. On 1 October 2014, in Debaltseve a soldier of the Brigade (Kononovych Ivan Mykolayovych) got himself into a landmine explosion killing him and wounding two other soldiers. Ukrainian columnist, Yuriy Butusov noted :

Two battalions of volunteers of the National Guard, made up entirely of Maidan activists, were created to perform the tasks of maintaining public order in Donbas. However, the mobilization resource of those ready to immediately leave everything and go to war was small. Provision and equipment of volunteers remained at a very low level. However, these two battalions, together with the "Omega" special forces unit of the Ministry of Internal Affairs, were the only units immediately transferred to the Sloviansk region to blockade the terrorist base. It was the first two battalions of the National Guard that performed a huge and invaluable amount of front-line work, while the country was reviving army units that were sent to the front in separate units. There was simply nothing else

Volunteers of the Kherson Oblast from Oleshki and Kherson routinely brought food to the base camps of the battalion. Also, the community of Oleshki collected 35 thousand hryvnias and purchased 40 sets of winter uniforms. On 6 October, the soldiers of the battalion returned to Kyiv for a short rest.

External image
- The battalion's soldiers return to their garrison on 6 October

At the occasion of the battalion's return to garrison, Arsen Avakov said:

Not all returned. Ten died. Dozens were injured... In front of the formation, they stood in a guard of honor next to the portraits of the fallen soldiers... Spontaneously rushed through the frozen ranks: Heroes do not die! .. Men, soldiers did not hold back tears.

In October 2014, the battalion held a press conference at the garrison of 27th Perchersk brigade. On 12 December 2014, personnel of the battalion detained a passenger car in Popasna attempting to smuggle one million hryvnias. On 26 December 2014, the operative group of the battalion detained a resident of the Donetsk Oblast on suspicions of being a separatist, further search showed that she was amongst the organizers of the 2014 Donbas status referendums, RGD-5 grenades, combat equipment, weapons and propaganda leaflets were confiscated.

=== 2015 ===
On 5 January 2015, a bus of the battalion suffered an accident while travelling from Sloviansk to Bakhmut. 13 soldiers of the brigade (Skrut Rostyslav Stefanovych, Maxim Yuriyovych Shchipov, Panteleimon Petrovych Rozhanskyi, Didach Ihor Yosypovych, Roman Mykhailovych Sokach Volodymyr Anatoliyovych Matkivskyi, Malyuta Roman Volodymyrovych, Linyvenko Yury Volodymyrovych, Ihor Valentynovych Kaplunenko, Roman Valentinovych Zubchuk, Burka Victor Pavlovich, Gerasimyuk Taras Pavlovich and Serhiy Ihorovych Babichev) and further wounding 21 personnel of the battalion.

=== 2018 ===
On 24 January 2018, Four Special Purpose "Varta" armoured vehicles were transferred to the battalion. On 27 January 2018, at lunchtime a soldier of the Battalion (Slyvka Myroslav Mykolayovych) was killed while performing a combat mission in Verkhnyotoretske near Horlivka as a result of sniper fire. On 22 March 2018, a soldier of the battalion (Myron Yaroslavovich Klymiuk) was killed on the frontlines in the ATO zone under undisclosed circumstances.

=== 2020 ===
On 11 October 2020, a veteran of the battalion, Mykola Mykolayovych Mykytenko, set himself on fire in Kyiv as a sign of protest against President Volodymyr Zelenskyy's policies.

=== 2022 ===
Following the Russian invasion of Ukraine, the Battalion saw intensive combat. The battalion met a large scale Russian force during the Battle of Popasna where they arrived on 23 February 2022. From the first days, the battalion also participated in the Battle of Kharkiv. It heavily partook in the Battle of Moshchun facing several casualties, during the battle, a soldier of the battalion (Mykola Volodymyrovych Maltsev) was killed on 9 March 2022, five soldiers of the battalion (Oleksandr Mykolayovych Bakumenko, Zabarilo Myron Stepanovych, Oleksienko Leonid Mykhailovych, Volodymyr Vasylovich Ostrovsky and Yaroslav Viktorovych) were killed on 12 March 2022 and another soldier (Ughryniuk Nazarii Ivanovich) on 13 March 2022. It took part in the Battle of Kyiv during which two soldiers of the battalion (Kolomyans Myroslav Zabarylo and Volodymyr Ostrovsky) were killed on 21 March 2022. On 13 April 2022, a soldier of the battalion (Ruslan Oleksandrovich Siksoi) was killed in a battle with Russian forces at an undisclosed location. The battalion also saw deployment in Lozova where on 17 April 2022, a soldier of the battalion (Kurtanich Felix Valeriyovych) was killed as a result of artillery strikes. On 20 April 2022, three soldiers of the battalion (Serhiy Popaz, Bohdan Suprun and Ivan Datsko) were killed in combat. On 23 May 2022, the battalion saw action in Yakovlivka clearing several forest strips, and ambushed the Russian forces but a Ukrainian soldier was killed and another wounded, the battle lasted six hours during which a soldier (Dmytro Ruslanovych Finashin) became unconscious and on waking up found himself alone, he survived behind the Russian lines for several weeks when the Ukrainian 95th Brigade finally found him, he was later awarded the Hero of Ukraine. On 23 May 2022, a soldier of the battalion (Svyatoslav Khomenko) was killed on the frontlines. The combat continued throughout June during which Maksym Petrenko, serving in the battalion was killed on 1 June 2023 and a soldier of the battalion (Mykhailo Tereshchenko) was killed on 14 June 2022. Similarly in September, a soldier of the battalion (Oleksandr Pidborizhnyi) was killed on the frontlines. The battalion took part in the Battle of Lyman an in the evening of 1 October 2022, the 81st Separate Airmobile Brigade and the Serhii Kulchytskyi Battalion liberated the city. In October, a soldier of the battalion (Oleksandr Zasyadko) was killed on 7 October. In December 2022, a soldier of the battalion (Oleksandr Kutovy) was killed on 6 December, another (Evgeny Veselovsky) was killed on 17 December and another one (Taras Ihorovych Tomachkovsky) on 27 December 2022.

=== 2023 ===
On 2 January 2023, a soldier of the battalion (Volodymyr Rybchuk) was killed in action. The battalion took part in the Battle of Bakhmut during which on 23 January 2023, the commander of the battalion's IT and communications platoon, Dmytro Borisovych Matvienko was killed in action. A soldier (Mykola Anatasky) was killed on 21 January 2023. In February 2023, as a part of the Offensive Guard, the battalion became a part of the 1st Presidential Operational Brigade. Combat continued, and on 14 April 2023, a soldier of the battalion (Vladyslav Dzikovsky) was killed in action. It again saw high intensity combat in June 2023, a soldier of the battalion (Ruslan Levko) was killed on 6 June, another (Mykola Maksymchuk) on 17 June, a third soldier (Volodymyr Gudzenko) on 19 June and a fourth one (Andrii Zolotukhin) on 29 June. The battalion took part in the Battle of Kupiansk during which on 22 July 2023, during a combat mission, a group of 45 State Border Guard Service of Ukraine soldiers were encircled, so an officer of the battalion, Major Serhii Volodymyrovych Tkachenko took their command and successfully evacuated them but was himself killed as a result of a mortar strike, he was awarded the Hero of Ukraine. On 26 July 2023, a soldier of the battalion (Rostislav Lazoryshyn) was killed in action.

=== 2024 ===
On 19 January 2024, an officer of the battalion (Anatsky Mykola Leonidovych) was killed as a result of the 2023 Brovary helicopter crash. On 20 April 2024, a soldier of the battalion (Boyko Ruslan) was killed in combat. A soldier of the battalion (Petro Petrajko) was killed on 2 September 2024 and another (Andriy Ivanyuk) on 2 October 2024.

== Commanders ==
- Commander: Ivanyshyn Roman
- Chief of Staff: Ivan Mateyko

== Structure ==
- Management and Headquarters
- 1st Operational Company
- 2nd Operational Company
- 3rd Operational Company

== External Media ==
External videos
- 1. Андрій Антонищак, координатор І-го батальйону Національної гвардії України у програмі «Прямим текстом»
- 2. Андрій Тірон про звільнення Слов'янська, — Громадське телебачення
- 3. Батальйон Нацгвардії імені Кульчицького повернувся із зони АТО
- 4. Сьогодні із зони АТО повернувся резервний батальйон Нацгвардії імені генерала Кульчицького
- 5. Батальйону Національної Гвардії імені генерала Кульчицького присвячується
- 6. Історія солдата батальйону імені Кульчицького, монастирищанина Максима Ботіка
- 7. Бійці Першого батальйону Нацгвардії
- 8. Війна за свій рахунок (документальний фільм про будні українських бійців у зоні АТО)

== Sources ==
- 1st Serhii Kulchytskyi Battalion on Facebook
- Секретар РНБО взяв участь у церемонії складання військової присяги Другого резервного батальйону НГУ
- Батальйон Нацгвардії імені Кульчицького повернувся із зони АТО (ФОТОРЕПОРТАЖ, ВІДЕО)
- Волонтерська допомога батальйону імені Кульчицького
- Гвардійці батальйону ім. генерала Кульчицького зустрілись з представниками громадських організацій та ЗМІ
- Батальйон НГУ отримав ім'я Героя України генерал-майора Кульчицького
- Вони були першими: батальйон імені Кульчицького
- "Батальйон імені Кульчицького отримав нові бронеавтомобілі "Варта"". ukrmilitary.com. Ukrainian Military Pages. 2018-01-24. Archived from the original on 25 January 2018.
- "Перші добровольці: Що ми знаємо про батальйон Кульчицького". ua.112.ua/. Channel 112. Archived from the original on 14 March 2018.
- "Батальйон імені Кульчицького отримав іменний штандарт". nkontrol.org.ua/. 2016-12-01. Archived from the original on 14 March 2018.
- Віктор Толочко, командир першого добровольчого батальйону Нацгвардії, полковник
