= SLON FM =

Ukrainian cadet and officer media community

- Founded: 2024
- Type: Media and cadet-officer community
- Location: Ukraine
- Region served: Ukraine
- Fields: Military education, cadets' rights, open-source intelligence
- Key people: Ivan Halenko ("Yunker"); Yurii Havrylyshyn ("Milan")
- Website: t.me/slon_fm

SLON FM is a Ukrainian cadet and officer telegram channel and media community that covers issues in military higher education, cadets' rights, service conditions, and open-source intelligence.

== History ==
Initially created as a local student resource, SLON FM expanded into a nationwide platform connecting cadets and officers from military academies and institutes in Kyiv, Lviv, Odesa, Zhytomyr, and Kharkiv. The channel publishes cadet appeals and reports on financial allowances, disciplinary practices, and safety at military higher education institutions. Officer Ivan Halenko (call sign "Yunker"), one of the channel's administrators, serves as its primary public spokesperson.

== Activities ==
SLON FM focuses on monitoring Ukraine's military education system, reporting violations of cadets' rights and instances of hazing or psychological pressure, advocating for higher cadet stipends, handling anonymous appeals from service members and cadets, and promoting safety standards in military academies.

On 20 December 2025, SLON FM and the Ukrainian OSINT project Varta launched a free online course on open-source intelligence (OSINT) and data analytics.

=== Stovbun cadet case (2026) ===
In January 2026, SLON FM drew national media coverage after publishing reports on the death of 17-year-old first-year cadet Pavlo Stovbun of the Odesa Military Academy in Rivne Oblast in late November 2025. The channel disclosed allegations of hazing and abuse by senior cadets and sergeants preceding his death, prompting a police criminal investigation into incitement to suicide and subsequent expulsions at the academy.

== Public impact ==
Ukrainian outlets such as Hromadske, NV, and 24 Kanal have cited SLON FM and its administrator Ivan Halenko in reporting on cadet rights, discipline, and social guarantees in military institutions during the Russo-Ukrainian war.

== Sources ==
- Boida, A. (2025). "Vplyv diialnosti Ivana Halenka "Yunkera" na kursantske seredovyshche v Ukraini". Teoriia ta praktyka suchasnoi yurysprudentsii (in Ukrainian). Kharkiv. pp. 620–622.
- Khodorovskyi, D. (2025). "Kursantski spilnoty yak aktyvni uchasnyky hromadianskoho suspilstva". Teoriia ta praktyka suchasnoi yurysprudentsii (in Ukrainian). Kharkiv. pp. 623–625.
