= Serhii Kulchytskyi =

Ukrainian major general (1963–2014)

- Сергій Петрович Кульчицький
- Born: 17 December 1963; Weimar, Efurt, East Germany (now Weimar, Thuringia, Germany)
- Died: 29 May 2014 (aged 50); Sloviansk, Donetsk Oblast, Ukraine
- Burial place: Lychakiv Cemetery
- Children: 1
- Military career
- Allegiance: Soviet Union (1981–1992); Ukraine (1992–2014)
- Branch: Soviet Navy (1981–1992); Internal Troops of Ukraine; (1992–2014); Ukrainian National Guard (2014)
- Rank: Major general
- Commands: Western Territorial Command of Internal Troops (deputy commander)
- Conflicts: Russo-Ukrainian War; War in Donbas; Siege of Sloviansk †
- Awards: Order of the Gold Star (Posthumous)

Serhii Petrovych Kulchytskyi (Ukrainian: Сергій Петрович Кульчицький; 17 December 1963 – 29 May 2014) was head of the military and special training directorate at the National Guard of Ukraine. Kulchytskyi was killed during the Siege of Sloviansk, when his helicopter was downed by armed pro-Russian separatists. 1st National Guard Battalion received his honorary name.

== Military career ==
Serhii Kulchytskyi had a military upbringing. His father served with Soviet forces stationed in East Germany. Kulchytskyi graduated from the Ussuriysk military college in the Soviet Far East in 1981. He went on to train at the Far Eastern Higher Military Command School in the city of Blagoveshchensk, attaining a distinction in 1985. His military career began with the role of marine platoon commander at the Soviet Northern Fleet, based in Murmansk. Kulchytskyi served in the Soviet Northern Fleet until the dissolution of the Union. Once Ukraine became an independent state, Kulchytskyi moved to western Ukraine and became deputy commander of a National Guard battalion in Ternopil in 1992. Moving up the ranks, he became the battalion's commander in 1994. In 2010 he was appointed deputy commander of the Western Command of the Ukrainian Interior Ministry's troops by President Viktor Yanukovych.

== Death ==
Kulchytskyi was travelling with soldiers to the Mount Karachun base near Sloviansk when their MI-8 helicopter was shot down by pro-Russian separatists armed with anti-aircraft weapons. The Major-General, six other National Guardsmen, and six special forces of the Interior Ministry were all killed. At the time, he was the highest-ranking officer to be killed in action.

=== Funeral ===
Kulchytskyi's funeral procession took place on 31 May, in the western city of Lviv at the Lychakiv Cemetery.

=== Legacy ===
Ukrainian president Petro Poroshenko congratulated the 27th Brigade of the National Guard with the title of the "Serhii Kulchytskyi Battalion", after Kulchytskyi.

A monument to Serhiy Kulchytskyi has been installed in Chortkiv.

== Awards ==
- Hero of Ukraine with the awarding of the «Golden Star» order (20 June 2014, posthumously).
- Order of Bohdan Khmelnytskyi 3rd class (20 August 2008).
- Order for Courage 3rd class (28 May, 1999).

== Personal life ==
Kulchytskyi was married with a son.
