= 1st Azov Corps =

National Guard of Ukraine formation

1st Corps of the Ukrainian National Guard
- 1-й корпус Національної гвардії України
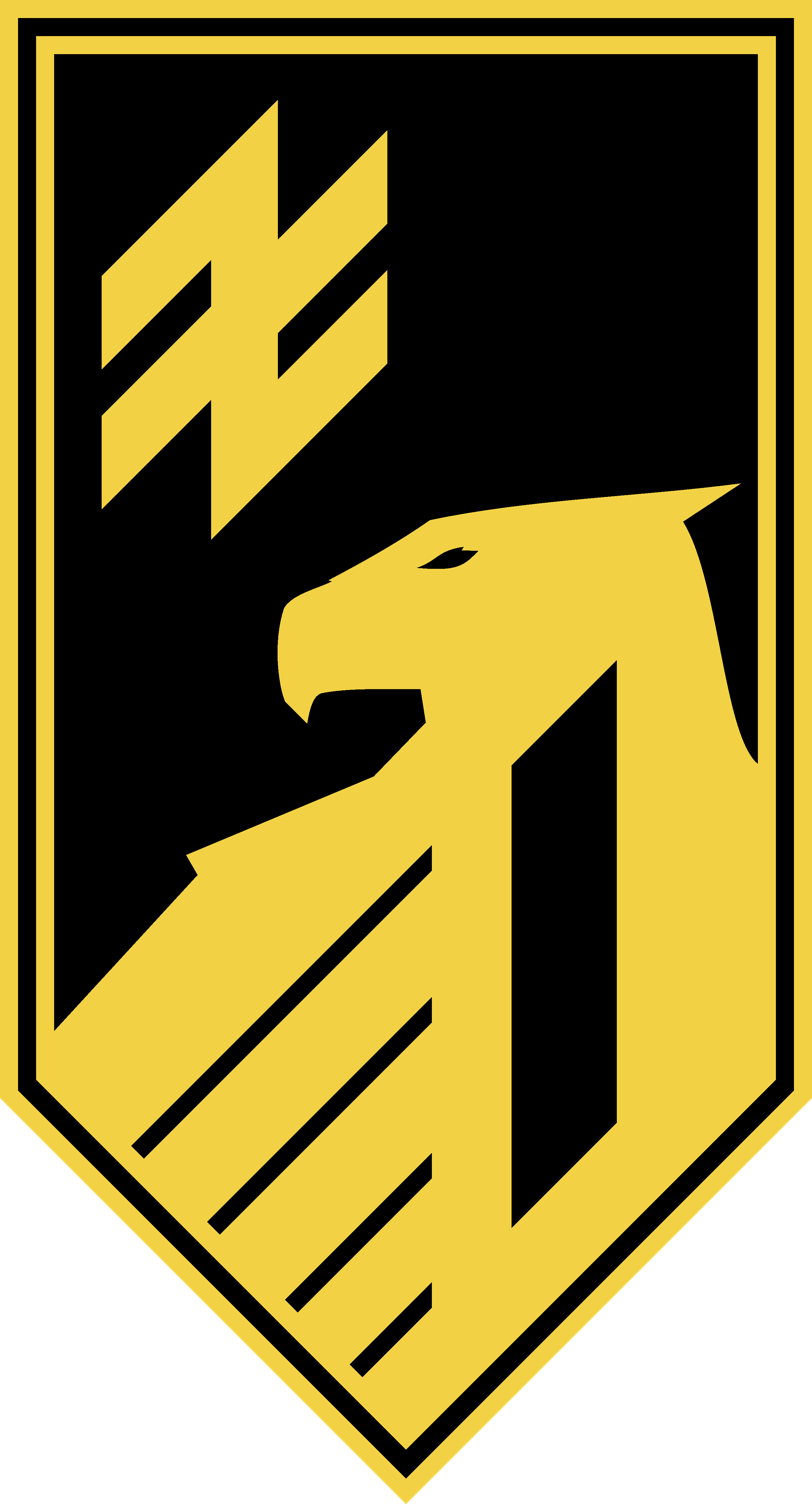
- Shoulder sleeve insignia
- Active: 15 April 2025 – present
- Country: Ukraine
- Branch: National Guard of Ukraine
- Size: Corps
- Mottos: In Fire, Iron is Melted into Steel, in Struggle, People Turn Into a Nation!
- Engagements: Russo-Ukrainian War: 2025 Dobropillia offensive; 2026 Dobropillia offensive
- Website: Official Facebook page

Commanders
- Current commander: Denys Prokopenko

Insignia
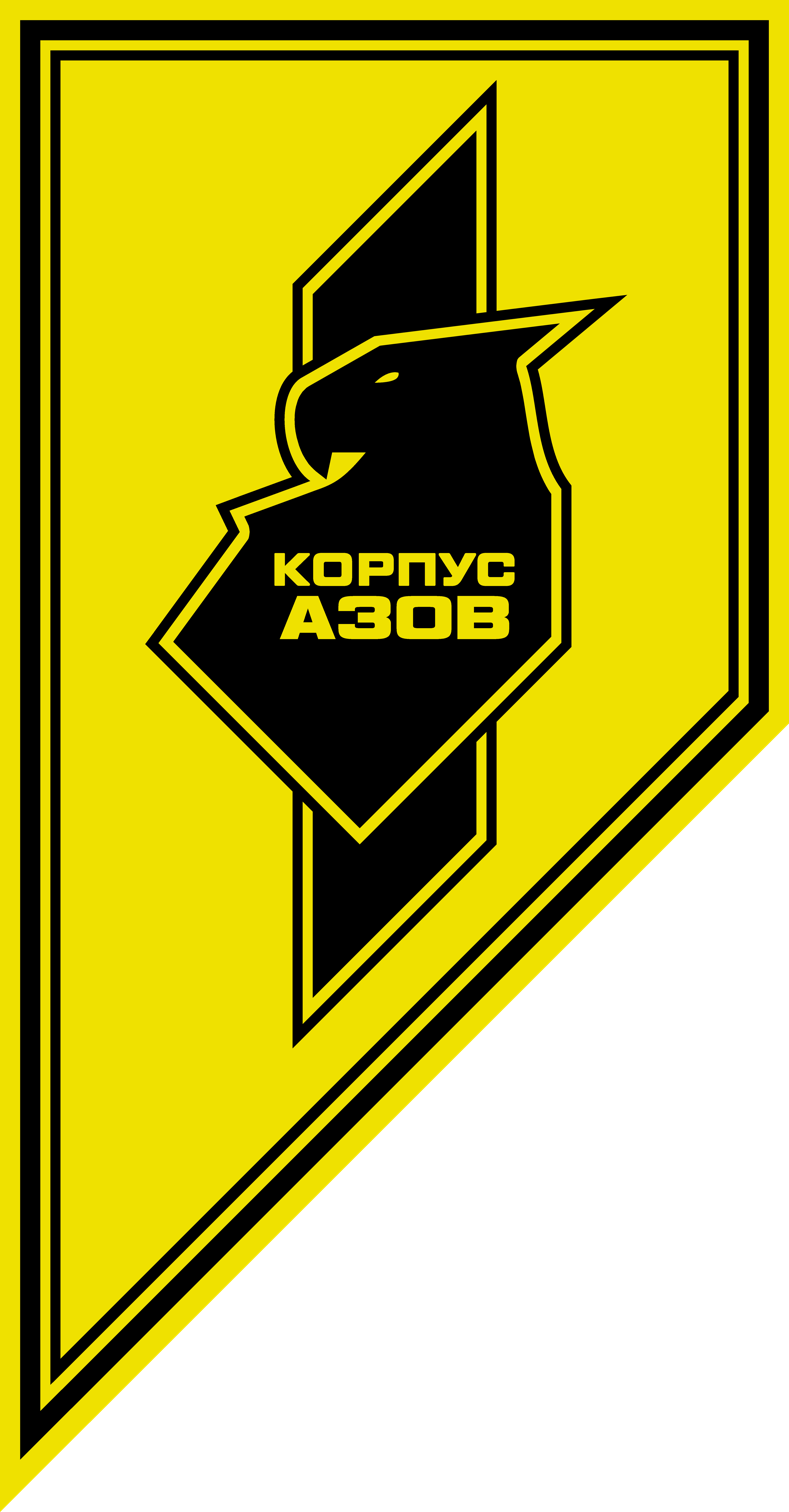
- Flag

The 1st Corps of the Ukrainian National Guard "Azov" (Ukrainian: 1-й корпус Національної гвардії України «Азов») is a corps of the National Guard of Ukraine.

== History ==
The 1st Azov Corps, a formation within the Ukrainian National Guard, has its roots tied to the earlier establishment of the Azov Brigade. The Azov unit was initially founded as a special forces battalion under the Ministry of Internal Affairs on 5 May 2014. The battalion quickly grew in prominence and capability, eventually scaling up to become the Azov Brigade, which played a crucial role in defending Ukraine since its inception.

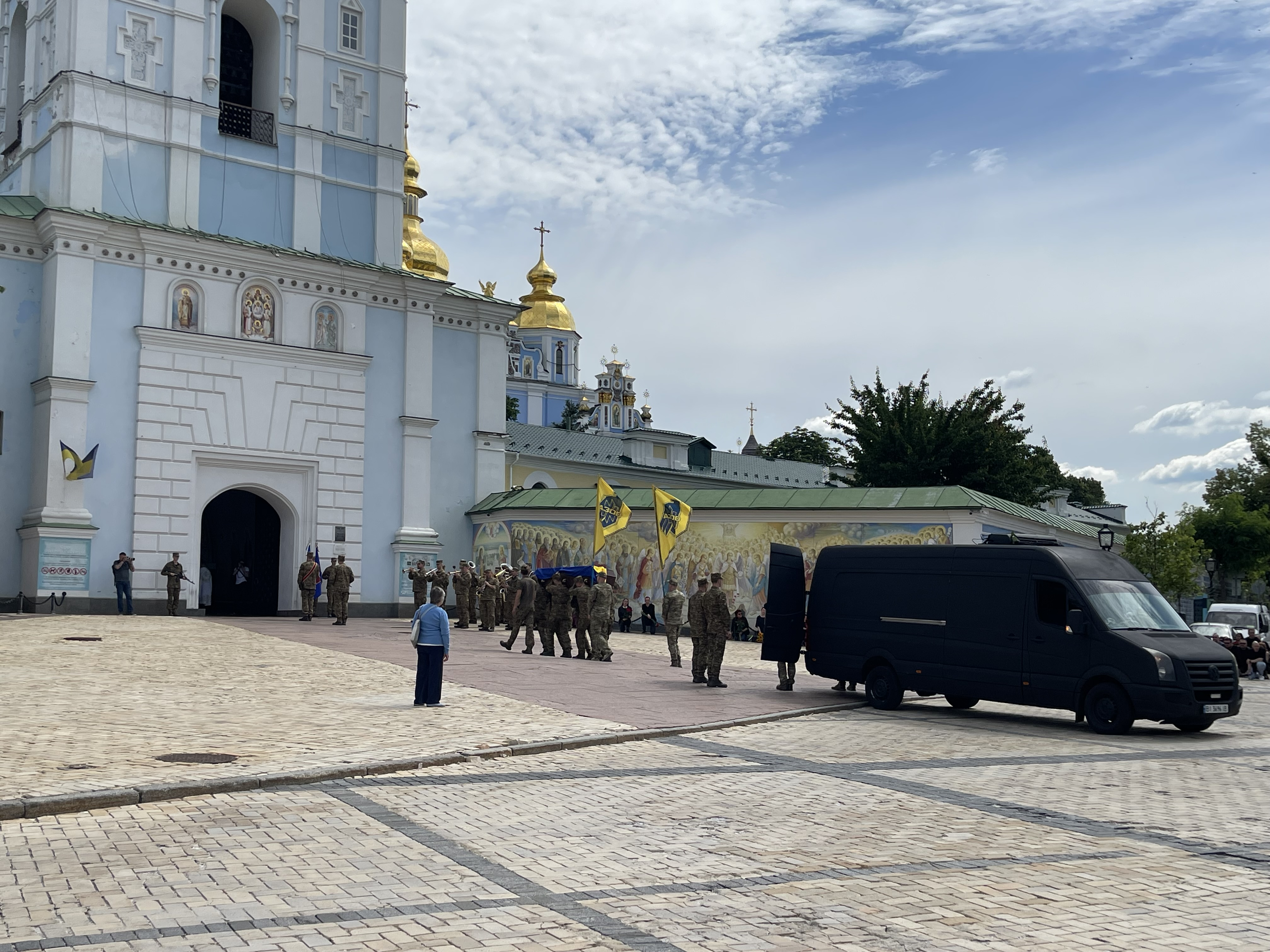
Funeral for a fallen Azov soldier in June 2025 on Saint Michael's Square. The banner and the flag are those of the original Azov Brigade

In a more recent development, the 1st Azov Corps was officially formed, with Colonel Denys Prokopenko, the commander of the Azov Brigade, appointed to lead this new corps. This move is part of a broader military reform within Ukraine, aiming to enhance the structure and operational effectiveness of its armed forces. The creation of the 1st Azov Corps signifies an evolution from the earlier volunteer militia roots into a more formalized and state-overseen military entity.

In August 2025, it was reported that units of the 1st Corps were involved in the recapture of the villages of Novovodiane, Petrivka, Rubizhne, Hruzke, Vesele and Zolotyi Kolodiaz in the Donetsk region.

== Structure ==
As of 2025 the corps structure is as follows:

- 1st Corps of the Ukrainian National Guard “Azov”
  - Corps Headquarters
    - Management
    - Commandant Platoon
  - Personnel Training Battalion
  - 41st Pilotless Systems Regiment "Pilum"
    - Pilotless Systems Detachment "Typhoon"
  - Anti-aircraft missile artillery division "Strazh"
  - R&D division "SxLüd"
  - Recruitment Service
  - Tuman Detachment
  - 1st Presidential Operational Brigade "Bureviy"
    - Brigade Command and Headquarters
    - 1st Operational Battalion "Forpost"
    - 3rd Operational Battalion "Hroza"
    - 4th Operational Battalion "Horyv"
    - Unmanned Systems Battalion "Kondor"
    - Artillery Division
    - Anti-Aircraft Missile Artillery Division "Borey"
    - Sniper Company "Bekas"
    - Technical Intelligence Unit "Zaychyky Chrkesa"
  - Harmash Brigade
  - 12th Special Purpose Brigade "Azov"
    - Brigade Command and Headquarters
    - 1st Special Purpose Battalion
    - 2nd Special Purpose Battalion
    - 3rd International Battalion
    - 6th Special Purpose Battalion
    - Brigade Artillery Group
    - Tank Battalion
    - Unmanned Systems Battalion
    - Anti-Aircraft Missile Artillery Battalion
    - Support Forces Battalion
    - Communications Node
    - Technical Intelligence Company
    - Medical Company
    - Sniper Company
    - Commandment's Company
    - Electronic Warfare Company
    - Service Support Battalion
    - Automobile Battalion
    - Special Purpose Reconnaissance Detachment
    - Psychological Service
  - 14th Operational Brigade "Chervona Kalyna"
    - Brigade Command and Headquarters
    - 1st Operational Battalion
    - 2nd Operational Battalion
    - 3rd Operational Battalion
    - 4th Guardsmen Battalion
    - 5th Guardsmen Battalion
    - 6th Guardsmen Battalion
    - Tank Company
    - Reconnaissance Company
    - Signal Company
    - Artillery Group
    - Anti-Aircraft Defense Battalion
    - Engineering Battalion
    - Logistics Battalion
  - 15th Operational Brigade "Kara-Dah"
    - Brigade Command and Headquarters
    - 1st Operational Battalion
    - 3rd Operational Battalion
    - 4th Guardsmen Battalion
    - 5th Guardsmen Battalion
    - 6th Guardsmen Battalion
    - Artillery Group
    - Tank Company
    - Special Purpose Reconnaissance Company
    - Unmanned Systems Battalion "Ghost of Khortytsia"
    - Anti-Aircraft Defense Battalion
    - Support Battalion
  - 20th Operational Brigade "Lyubart"
    - Brigade Command and Headquarters
    - 1st Special Purpose Battalion
    - 2nd Special Purpose Battalion
    - Kulchytskyi Battalion
    - 3rd Special Purpose Battalion
    - Mortar Battery
    - Reconnaissance Company
    - Unmanned Systems Company
    - Medical Service
  - 425th Assault Regiment

== See also ==
- Women drone operators in the Ukrainian military
