= Maksym Petrenko =

Ukrainian writer, inventor, soldier (1983–2022)

- Максим Петренко
- Born: Maksym Vitaliovych Petrenko; 11 December 1983; Kyiv, Ukrainian SSR, Soviet Union (now Kyiv, Ukraine)
- Died: 1 June 2022 (aged 38); Studenok, Izium Raion, Kharkiv Oblast, Ukraine
- Other name: Dotsent (Доцент)
- Education: Open International University of Human Development "Ukraine"
- Occupations: Writer, scientist, inventor, educator, soldier
- Awards: Order for Courage, 3rd class

Maksym Vitaliovych Petrenko (Ukrainian: Максим Віталійович Петренко; 11 December 1983 – 1 June 2022) was a Ukrainian writer, scientist, inventor, educator, soldier, senior soldier of the National Guard of Ukraine, a participant in the Russian-Ukrainian war. Candidate of Technical Sciences (2022), Docent.

== Biography ==
Maksym Petrenko was born on 11 December 1983 in Kyiv, Ukrainian SSR.

In 2008, he graduated from the Open International University of Human Development "Ukraine" (with honors in Computer Environmental and Economic Monitoring), where he worked his way up from a laboratory assistant to the head of the Computer Engineering Department since 2003. He studied in South Korea and developed programmable constructors. In 2012, he ran 42 km during a marathon.

An active participant in the Revolution of Dignity, he was a member of the Maidan Self-Defense. At the beginning of the Russian-Ukrainian war, he volunteered to go to the front, where he fought in the 2nd Reserve Battalion of Operational Purpose of the National Guard of Ukraine. He participated in the fighting near Debaltseve and Sloviansk. During his rotations, he continued to teach. In 2016, he was demobilized.

In 2018, Maksym enrolled in the Kyiv School of Economics under a program for veterans.

From 24 February 2022, he was back at the front. He defended Kyiv and eastern Ukraine. He served as a senior rifleman and aerial reconnaissance officer of the Serhii Kulchytskyi Operational Battalion of the National Guard of Ukraine. He died on 1 June 2022 in Studenok, Kharkiv Oblast.

He was buried in the Alley of Heroes of the Forest Cemetery in Kyiv.

== Works ==
He started writing in 2015.

Maksym's works are published in the literary collection "Holos viiny: istorii veteraniv". In 2019, he published the book "Spokiinoi nochi". He is an active participant in the Veteran's Book Tents and the All-Ukrainian Forum of Military Writers.

== Awards ==
- Order for Courage, 3rd class (23 February 2024, posthumously)
- finalist of the International competition of autonomous robotic platforms "Roborace"
- Badge for Valiant Service
