= Pilotless Systems Detachment "Typhoon" =

- Окремий загін безпілотних систем «Тайфун» (Ukrainian)
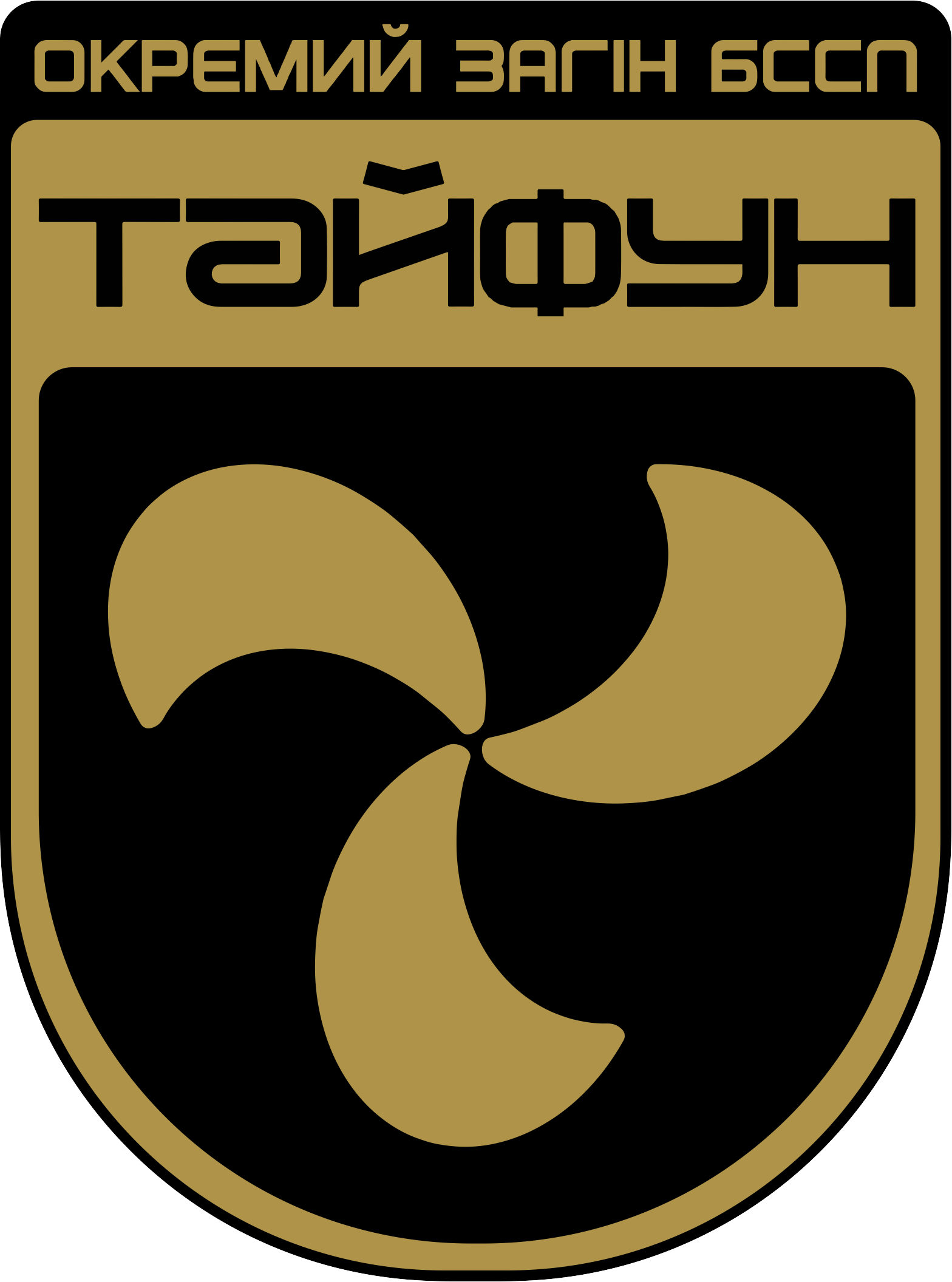
- Typhoon Insignia
- Founded: 31 May 2024
- Country: Ukraine
- Allegiance: Ministry of Internal Affairs
- Type: Special Force
- Role: UAV operations
- Part of: National Guard of Ukraine; 1st Azov Corps; 41st Pilotless Systems Regiment "Pilum"; Pilotless Systems Detachment "Typhoon"
- Garrison/HQ: Kyiv
- Engagements: Russo-Ukrainian war: Russian invasion of Ukraine

Commanders
- Current commander: Mykhailo Kmytyuk

The Pilotless Systems Detachment "Typhoon" (Ukrainian: Окремий загін безпілотних систем «Тайфун», romanized: Okremyj zahin bezpilotnykh system "Tajfun"), also known as Typhoon Unit, is a special forces unit that is part of the National Guard of Ukraine. Originally conducting FPV drone missions, the unit is expanding its capabilities to other types of Unmanned Aerial Vehicles. It was established in July 2024 and is garrisoned at Kyiv. The unit's FPV drones already operating on the frontlines would be followed with multirotor, aircraft-type and strike UAVs.

The Typhoon unit has been tasked with providing combat support to the Offensive Guard as well as to provide training for the proper operation of FPV drones.

It can also be readily deployed in order to provide UAV support during special operations. It also began testing and incorporation of Electronic warfare resistant UAVs in its composition.

== History ==
The unit was established in July 2024, with the purpose of the operation of Unmanned vehicles.

External videos
- Як створити спецпідрозділ дронщиків: командир групи спецпризначення нгу «тайфун» Руслан Гайдай on YouTube

In August 2024, the unit was already operating on the frontlines and on 10 August 2024, two Russian tanks were destroyed by the unit, similarly, some Russian aerial vehicles were also destroyed by the unit's FPV drones. In May 2025, it was redesignated as a special forces battalion within the 41st Pilotless Systems Regiment "Pilum" of the 1st Azov Corps of the National Guard of Ukraine.

In November 2025, Typhoon gained international fame for establishing the first all-women combat crew (Ukrainian: бойовий екіпаж, romanized: bojovyj ekipazh) of Ukrainian drone operators.

== Command ==
The commanders of the unit are veteran special operatives from various special purpose units of the National Guard of Ukraine:

- Commander: Mykhailo Kmytyuk (Callsign:"Michael")
- Deputy Commander for Combat Training: Pavlo Gvozdenko (Callsign:"Minister")

== Structure ==
- 1st Special Purpose Group
- 2nd Special Purpose Group
- 3rd Special Purpose Group
