= Lubart Brigade =

Ukrainian National Guard brigade

20th Operational Brigade "Lubart"
- 20-та бригада оперативного призначення НГУ «Любарт» 20-ta bryhada operatyvnoho pryznachennia NHU «Liubart»
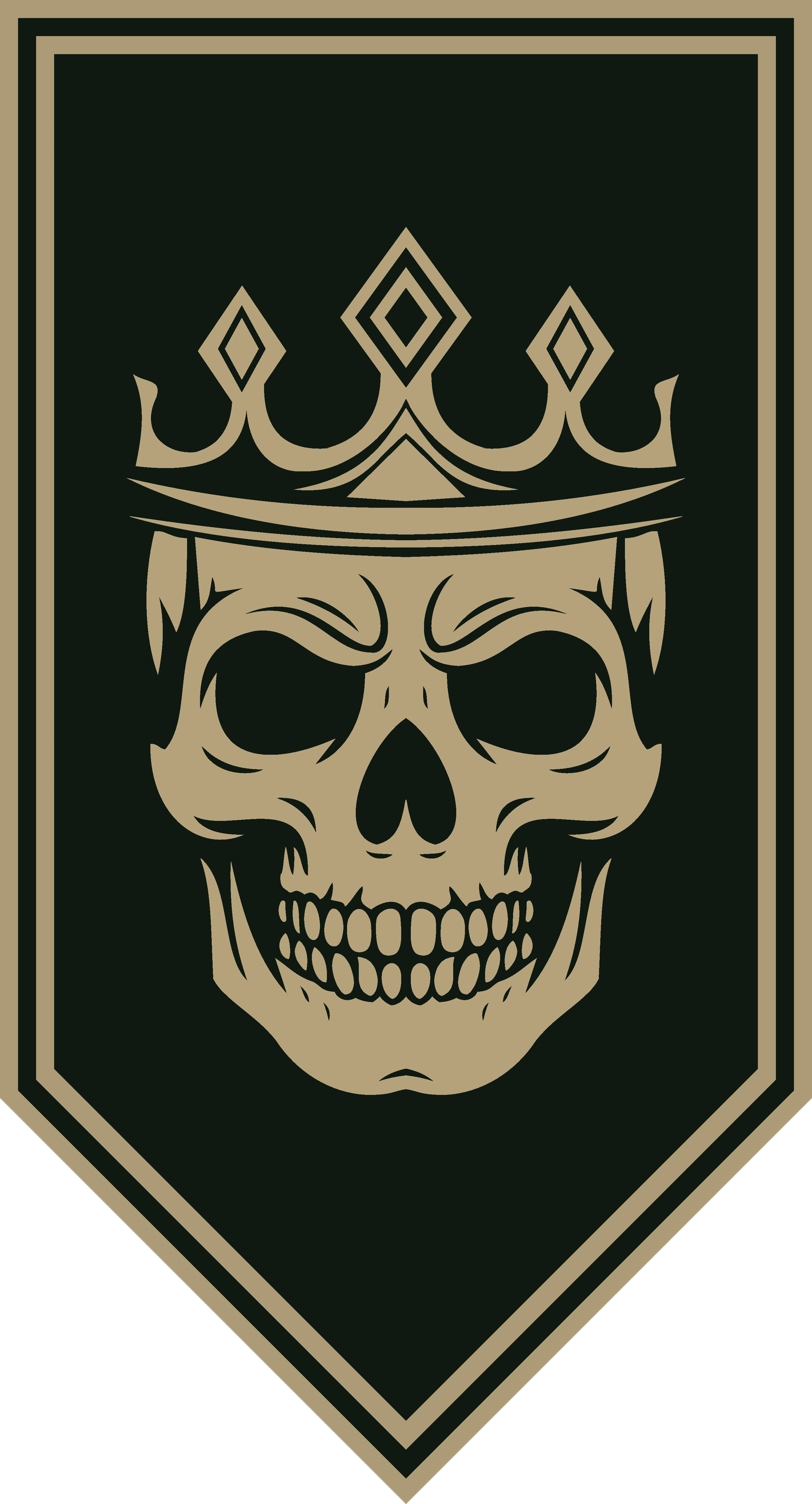
- Lubart's patch
- Founded: 24 February 2022
- Country: Ukraine
- Branch: National Guard of Ukraine (2022–present)
- Part of: 12th Operational Brigade (2022-2023); 1st Azov Corps
- Patron: Liubartas
- Colours: Black and gold
- Engagements: Russo-Ukrainian War; Russian invasion of Ukraine; Ukrainian counteroffensive (2023); Velyka Novosilka offensive; Battle of Krynky; Battles in Serebryanskyi forest; Battles of Donbas (since 2022); Battle of Bakhmut; Battles of Toretsk (2024); Pokrovsk offensive
- Website: www.lubart.army

Commanders
- Current commander: Vadym Krykun (2023 – present)

Insignia
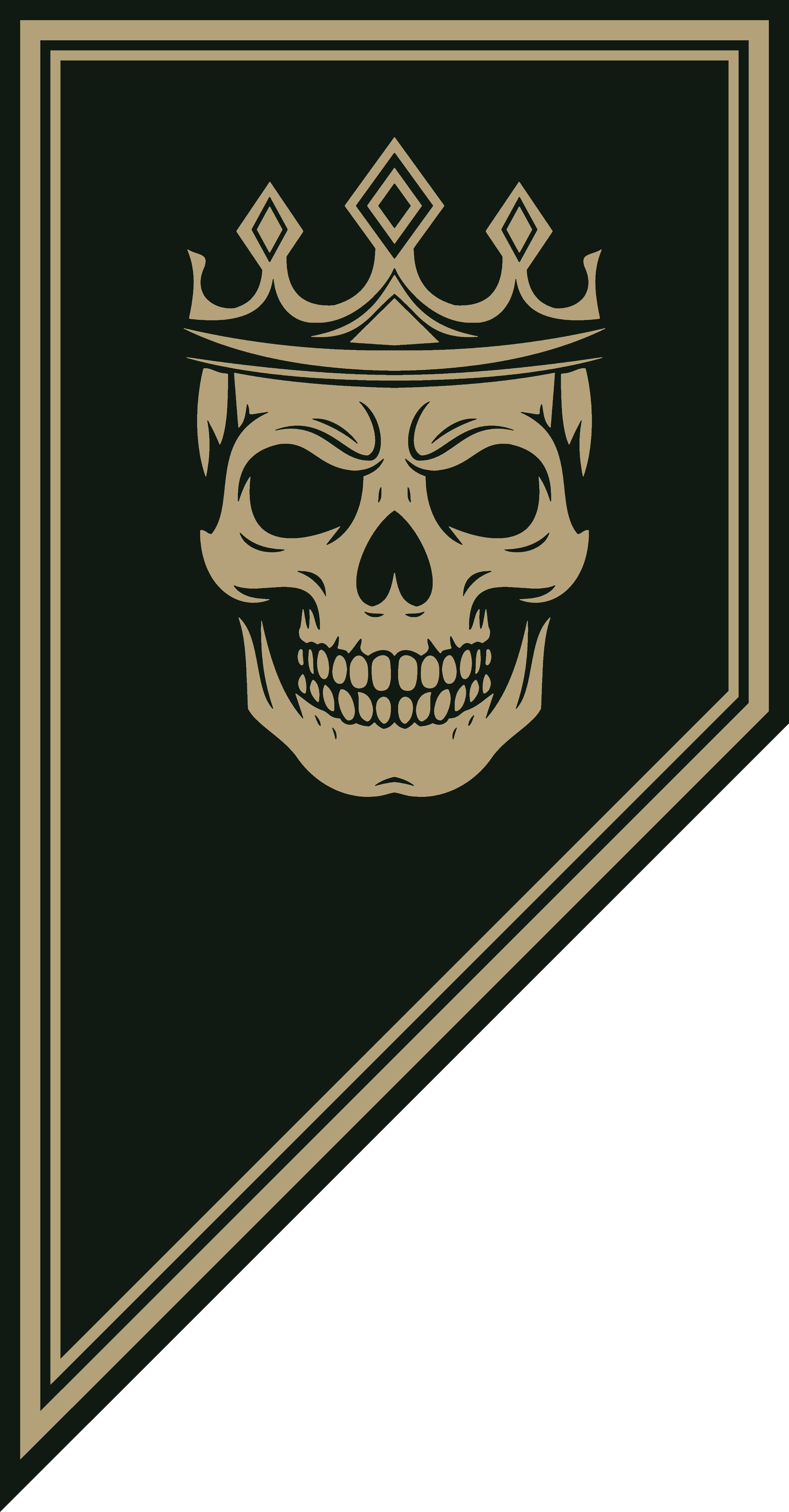
- Flag

Operators of "Teenagers" special purpose unit

The 20th Operational Brigade “Lubart” (Ukrainian: 20-та бригада оперативного призначення НГУ «Любарт», romanized: 20-ta bryhada operatyvnoho pryznachennia NHU «Liubart») is a military formation of the National Guard of Ukraine within the 1st Corps "Azov".

At the beginning of Russia’s full-scale invasion, the "Lubart" special unit was established in Volyn as a DFTG. In the summer of 2022, the special unit was reorganized into the Separate Special Forces Detachment (OZSP) "Lubart". In February 2024, it became part of the "Azov" brigade as the 5th Special Forces Battalion. On April 15, 2025, the battalion was expanded into the 20th Operational Brigade, and the brigade joined the 1st NGU Corps "Azov".

The brigade is named after Liubartas, prince of Volhynia (now Volyn) and Galicia. Lubart is the Ukrainian form of the Lithuanian given name Liubartas.

== History ==
The Lubart brigade was initially formed from veterans of the "Azov" Separate Special Forces Detachment (OZSP) and former participants in the ATO from Volyn and Galicia. Later, volunteers, representatives of the ultras movement, and members of various patriotic organizations began joining the experienced fighters.

=== DFTG “Lubart” ===
The “Lubart” volunteer unit was created in Volyn in February 2022 — in the first days of Russia’s full-scale invasion of Ukraine. The official founding date is 26 February 2022. The name was chosen in honor of prince Lubart from the Gediminid dynasty, a 14th-century ruler and defender of the Kingdom of Galicia and Volhynia. The square in front of Lutsk Castle (also known as Lubart’s Castle) became the gathering place for volunteers who formed the core of the DFTG. The premises of the Holy Archangel Men’s Castle Monastery of the Orthodox Church of Ukraine (Lutsk) were used as headquarters and barracks.

At first, DFTG "Lubart" fighters, jointly with representatives of the special services, took part in identifying and detaining enemy sabotage groups and agents in the region. The first combat tasks of the newly formed unit were to guard strategic facilities near Lutsk and provide cover for Lutsk Airport. In March 2022, "Lubart" fighters conducted combat duty on the state border with Belarus, from which there was a high threat of enemy invasion at that time. At the same time, the unit’s fighters underwent intensive combat training for further service in the combat zone.

In April 2022, "Lubart" was engaged in combat tasks in the newly de-occupied areas of Kyiv Oblast. In particular, Lubart personnel carried out clearing operations and supported sapper teams that conducted demining of residential neighborhoods, infrastructure facilities, and roads in Borodianka and surrounding villages. In some settlements, it was "Lubart" fighters who became the first military personnel to enter after Russian occupation forces had been driven out.

=== OZSP "Lubart" ===
Since by the end of spring 2022 the situation on the border with the Republic of Belarus remained stable, the leadership of "Lubart" decided to scale up the unit’s activities. As a result, in May of that year, DFTG "Lubart" was reorganized into a special operations detachment of the Special Operations Forces of the Armed Forces of Ukraine. Together with other SOF units, its fighters participated in several key moments of defense, reconnaissance, and counteroffensive actions during the Russo-Ukrainian war in 2022–2023.

In the summer of 2022, "Lubart" was actively involved in combat missions in the southern sector of Donetsk Oblast. The unit operated in the areas of Neskuchne and Velyka Novosilka settlements. During the fighting, dozens of occupiers were eliminated, and one enemy officer was taken prisoner. The unit was also involved in the defense of Zaporizhzhia Oblast [6]. Later, "Lubart" became part of the SOF Resistance Movement of the Armed Forces of Ukraine, "West". During the winter of 2022–2023, OZSP "Lubart" took direct part in fierce battles for the city of Bakhmut. The detachment's area of responsibility was the southeastern part of the settlement.

In spring 2023, “Lubart” fighters completed an advanced combat training course in the Republic of Poland under the U.S. Army Ranger training program, which significantly strengthened the unit’s combat capabilities. In summer 2023, the special unit carried out special missions on the left bank of the Dnipro River—in the areas of Kozachi Laheri, Krynky, Poima, Korsunka, and on islands in the river’s delta.

In early August 2023, “Lubart” fighters were involved in a sabotage operation on the left bank of the Dnipro River near the village of Kozachi Laheri. It was at this time that the unit suffered its first losses. The combat actions were aimed to divert the enemy’s attention and create conditions for further operations in other sectors of the front.

In October 2023, the SOF “Lubart” detachment was redeployed to the Zaporizhzhia direction, where it took part in assault operations near the settlements of Verbove and Novopokrovka. In November 2023, the fighters returned to Kherson Oblast. During this period, the unit conducted reconnaissance on the Dnipro River islands and in the floodplains, searching for weak points in the enemy’s defenses to the south of Krynky.

=== 5th Special Forces Battalion "Lubart" ===
On 12 February 2024, OZSP “Lubart” joined the 12th Special Forces Brigade “Azov” as the 5th Special Forces Battalion.

From spring 2024, “Lubart” fighters, as part of the 12th Special Forces Brigade “Azov,” took an active part in combat operations in the Serebrianskyi Forest in Luhansk Oblast. In summer, “Lubart” fighters conducted counteroffensive actions in the area of the Siverskyi Donets River.

Since early autumn 2024, the 5th Battalion “Lubart” has been actively involved in combat operations in the Toretsk–New York direction in Donetsk Oblast, between the villages of Nelipivka and New York.

=== 20th Operational Brigade “Lubart” ===
In April 2025, the battalion was expanded into the 20th Operational Brigade. The brigade joined the 1st Corps of the National Guard of Ukraine "Azov". As of April of 2025 the Corps had five brigades, including Lubart. The 1st Corps fought in the most active combat sectors in the Donetsk region, expanding responsibility in the Toretsk Direction.

In August of 2025 Lubart and the 1st Corp fought in the defense of Kostiantynivka in Donetsk..Lubart, as part of the Azov Brigade, 1st National Guard Corps, was stationed west of Kostiantynivka, and faced heavy drone warfare.

On 1 October 2025, on the occasion of the Day of Defenders of Ukraine, the “Lubart” Operational Brigade received its battle flag. It was presented by the President of Ukraine, Volodymyr Zelenskyy, to the brigade commander, Lieutenant Colonel Vadym “Yankee” Krykun.

Since October 2025, fighters of the “Lubart” brigade have been carrying out combat missions in the Dobropillia–Pokrovsk direction in the area of the settlement of Rodynske. In January 2026 Rodynske was back under control of Lubart and the 1st Corps.

== Structure ==
Unit Headquarters

- 1st Operational Battalion
  - 1st Operational Company
  - 2nd Operational Company "Albin"
  - Unmanned Systems Company
- Unmanned Systems Battalion "Nachtigall" (Dmytro Koliada "Kholod")
  - Unmanned Ground Vehicles Company
- 4th Operational Battalion "Kulchitskyi"
- 1st Artillery Battalion
- 2nd Artillery Battalion
- Anti-Aircraft Missile and Artillery Battalion “Nebesnyi Vluchnyk”
- Fire Support Company
- Mortar Battery
- Special Purpose Reconnaissance Company "Teenagers" (Dmytro "Malyshka")
- Support Battalion "Kovali"
- Automobile Battalion
- Signals Company
- Medical Service
- Khorunzha Service
- Patronage Service
- Recruitment Service
- Engineer-Sapper Company “Lubart’s Smiths” (Commander — Danyil Vlasovych “Tiur”)
- Lubart Suprovid (Care Service)
- Signifer Service
- Lubart Foundation

== Command ==
Commanders:

- 2023: Vadym Krykun (“Yankee”)

Chiefs of Staff:

- 2023–2024: Andrii Diachenko (“Khorvat”)
- 2024–2026: Roman Hladun (“Aspirant”)

== Lubart Suprovid (Care Service) ==
Lubart Suprovid is a structural unit focused on providing comprehensive support, recovery, and ongoing assistance to service members of the “Lubart” brigade who have been wounded or fallen ill while defending Ukraine. Commander: Yuliia Chepurko (“Yula”).

Areas of activity

- Medical, psychological, and social support for wounded fighters.
- Support for service members’ families at all stages of treatment and rehabilitation.
- Honoring the memory of fallen Heroes and assisting their loved ones.

The service coordinates interaction between military structures, medical institutions, volunteers, and state institutions. Its partners include, among others, the charitable foundation “Volyn SOS” and the brand M-Tac.

The public organization “Lubart Suprovid” engages donors and partners to cover the financial needs of treatment and rehabilitation and, where possible, facilitates the involvement of civilian specialists (medical personnel, coordinators, logisticians, case managers, drivers).

== Signifer Service ==
Signifer Service (from Latin “signifer” – standard-bearer) is a structural unit of the brigade responsible for shaping the unit’s internal culture, upholding traditions and identity, and ensuring communication between service members, society, and state institutions. Signifer Service of the “Lubart” brigade was established in 2025. Signifers are servicemen of this subunit. Commander: Marko Melnyk (“Vyrii”). Signifers carry out combat missions alongside line units in the combat zone.

Duties of a signifer

- Worldview and humanitarian training of personnel (lectures, talks, discussions on relevant historical and ideological topics).
- Monitoring the unit's moral climate.
- Informing personnel and answering a wide variety of questions.
- Organizing and participating in public events and outreach.

“Lubart” carries on and develops the Azov tradition of the Khorunzha Sluzhba, cultivating a modern military culture about systematic work with meaning that holds the unit together from within.

A signifer in “Lubart”, first of all, is a bearer of ideological, philosophical, and historical memory, as well as a guardian of the unit’s symbols and regalia. Their mission encompasses educational, research, lecturing, publishing, and media work aimed at fighters across all subunits and at civilian society, primarily youth. In wartime, such work becomes critically important: the Khorunzhy Service serves as an antidote to hostile pseudo-historical narratives, ideological subversion, and information-psychological operations.

The very term “khorunzhyi” appeals to the Cossack tradition, although it has no direct institutional analogues in the Zaporozhian Host, the army of the Ukrainian People’s Republic, or the Hetmanate. This is its fundamental distinctive feature. A “Lubart” signifer is not a military rank or title in the classical sense, as it was during the 1917–1921 War of Independence. Rather, it is a marker of meaning that determines a person’s place in the internal hierarchy of honor and responsibility.

Signifer is a stylised name for the Ukrainian “khorunzhyi”. The name “khorunzhyi” directly points to its connection with the most sacred thing a unit possesses—its battle banner, the khoruhva. It embodies honor, continuity, and the shared memory of the military formation. To be a khorunzhyi means to stand guard not only over the flag, but also over the meanings for which that flag is raised in battle.

A separate nationwide project of Signifer Service is the All-Ukrainian Military Culture Forum “Steel Word” and a network of “Steel Word” military culture clubs based at higher education institutions, volunteer communities, and veteran communities in the following cities (as of December 2025): Kyiv, Poltava, Lutsk, Odesa, Rivne, Lviv, Dubno (Rivne Oblast), Lubar (Zhytomyr Oblast), Kryvyi Rih, Novovolynsk (Volyn Oblast).

The first All-Ukrainian Forum of Military Culture “Steel Word” took place in Poltava on 21–23 November 2025. According to information from local self-government bodies and state institutions of the Poltava region, it was the first forum of this format in Ukraine, bringing together service members, veterans, publishers, journalists, artists, and government representatives.

The project was initiated by Signifer Service in partnership with the Poltava Regional Military Administration.

The program of the first three-day event included panel discussions and roundtables, book presentations by service members and veterans and autograph sessions, as well as thematic meetings hosted at veteran institutions’ venues.

== Lubart Foundation ==
Lubart Foundation is the official support platform for the “Lubart” brigade.

The platform publishes information on current fundraising campaigns (including for ground robotic systems and reconnaissance observation equipment) and data on assistance provided (such as drones, vehicles, generators, and funding for communications equipment).

== Charitable support ==
The Lutsk literary festival Frontera has actively supported the 20th Operational Brigade “Lubart”. In 2026, more than UAH 1 million(approximately US$22,300) was raised for the brigade as part of the festival. The largest portion of the funds was allocated to the purchase of communications equipment for the brigade through the Come Back Alive Charity. Additional funds were raised to cover the brigade’s current needs and to support the treatment and rehabilitation of its service members.

== Symbolism ==
The primary colors used by the brigade for insignia are subdued dark green, black, and beige. The central symbol of the insignia is a hollow skull with deep detailing and a crown above the head. Since the 19th century, Adam’s skull in European military aesthetics has symbolized contempt for death, while the crown alludes to the Volhynian Prince Lubart, who is the brigade’s patron.

On the DFTG “Lubart” shoulder patch, in addition to the crowned skull, there was the inscription “The dead do not fear death,” later replaced by “Amat victoria curam” (Latin: “Victory loves the prepared”). Today, the brigade’s sleeve insignia has a pentagonal shape, symbolizing the “Shield of the Nation.”

== See also ==
- Azov Brigade
