= 1st Presidential Operational Brigade =

National Guard of Ukraine unit

1st Presidential Brigade of Operational Assignment
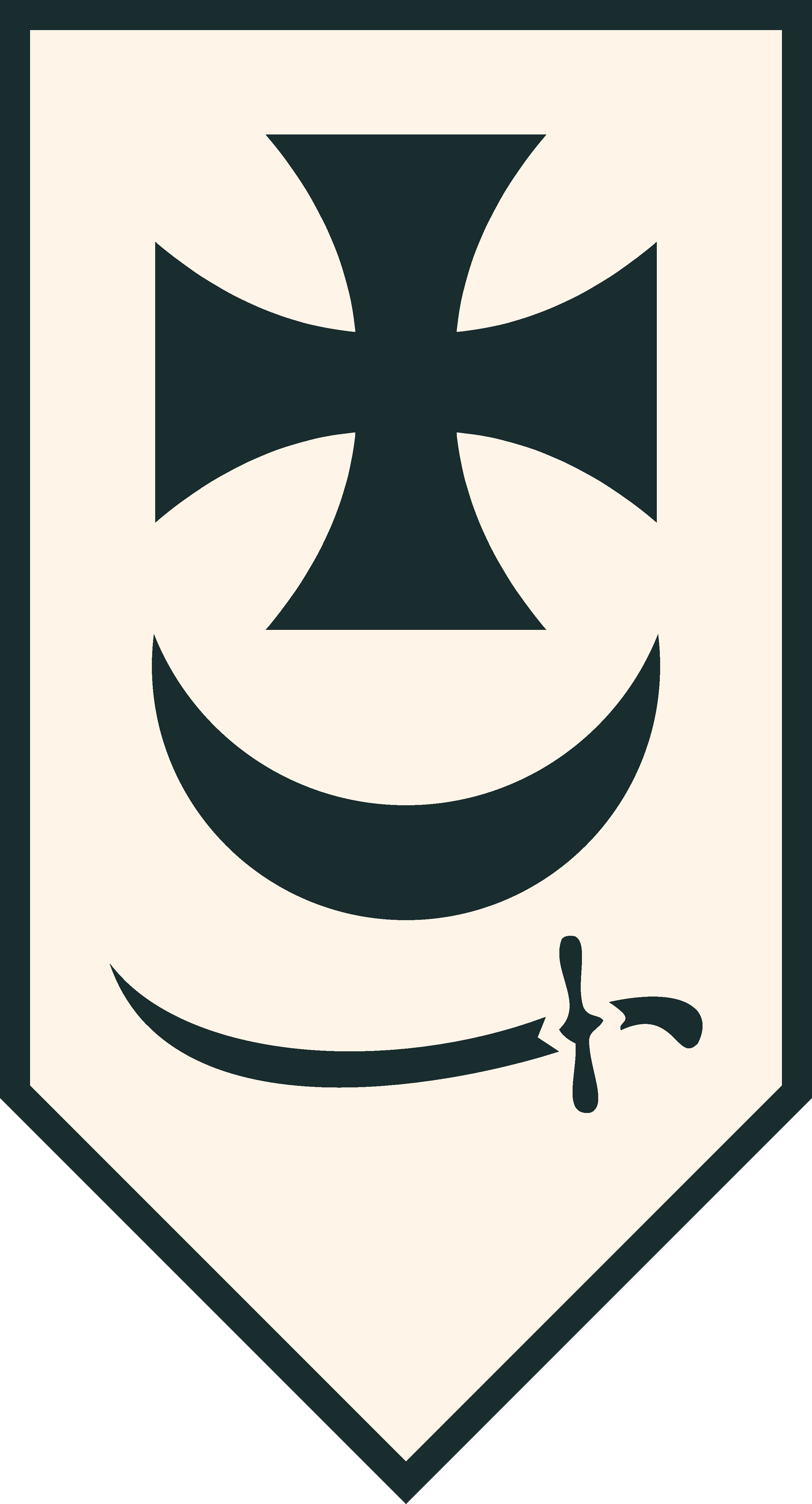
- Coat of arms of the brigade
- Active: July 27, 2014 – present
- Allegiance: Ukraine
- Type: Brigade
- Role: Offensive Guard
- Part of: 1st Azov Corps
- Garrison/HQ: Vyshhorod, Kyiv Oblast
- Nickname: "Hurricane"
- Patron: Hetman Petro Doroshenko
- Mottos: "І ця буря йде на ворогів, вступай і наступай!" ("And this storm is coming against the enemies, step in and attack!")
- Engagements: War in Donbas: Battle of Krasnyi Lyman; Battle of Ilovaisk; Russian invasion of Ukraine: Battle of Kyiv; Battle of Hostomel; Battle of Moshchun; Eastern front; Battle of Donbas; Battle of Severodonetsk; Battle of Lysychansk; Battle of Bakhmut; Battle of Niu-York; Battle of Bilohorivka; Kupiansk offensive
- Decorations: For Courage and Bravery
- Website: bureviy.army

Commanders
- Current commander: Colonel Anton Zadorozhnyi

Insignia
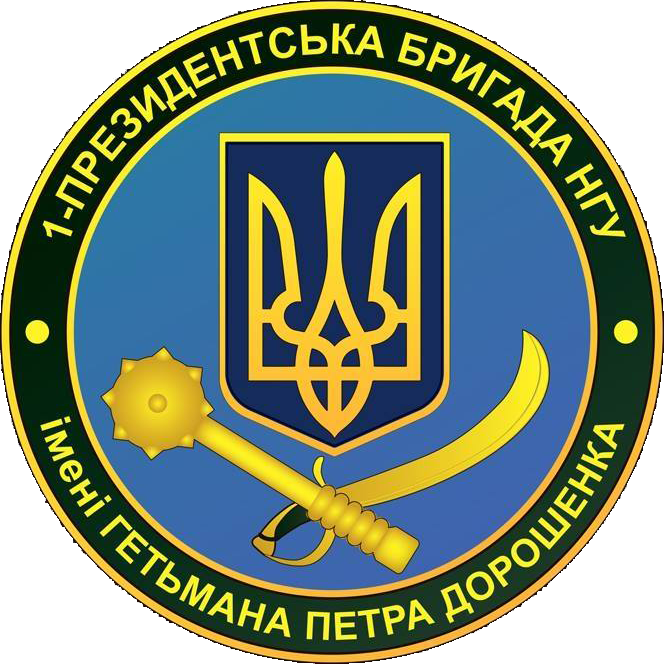
- Old patch

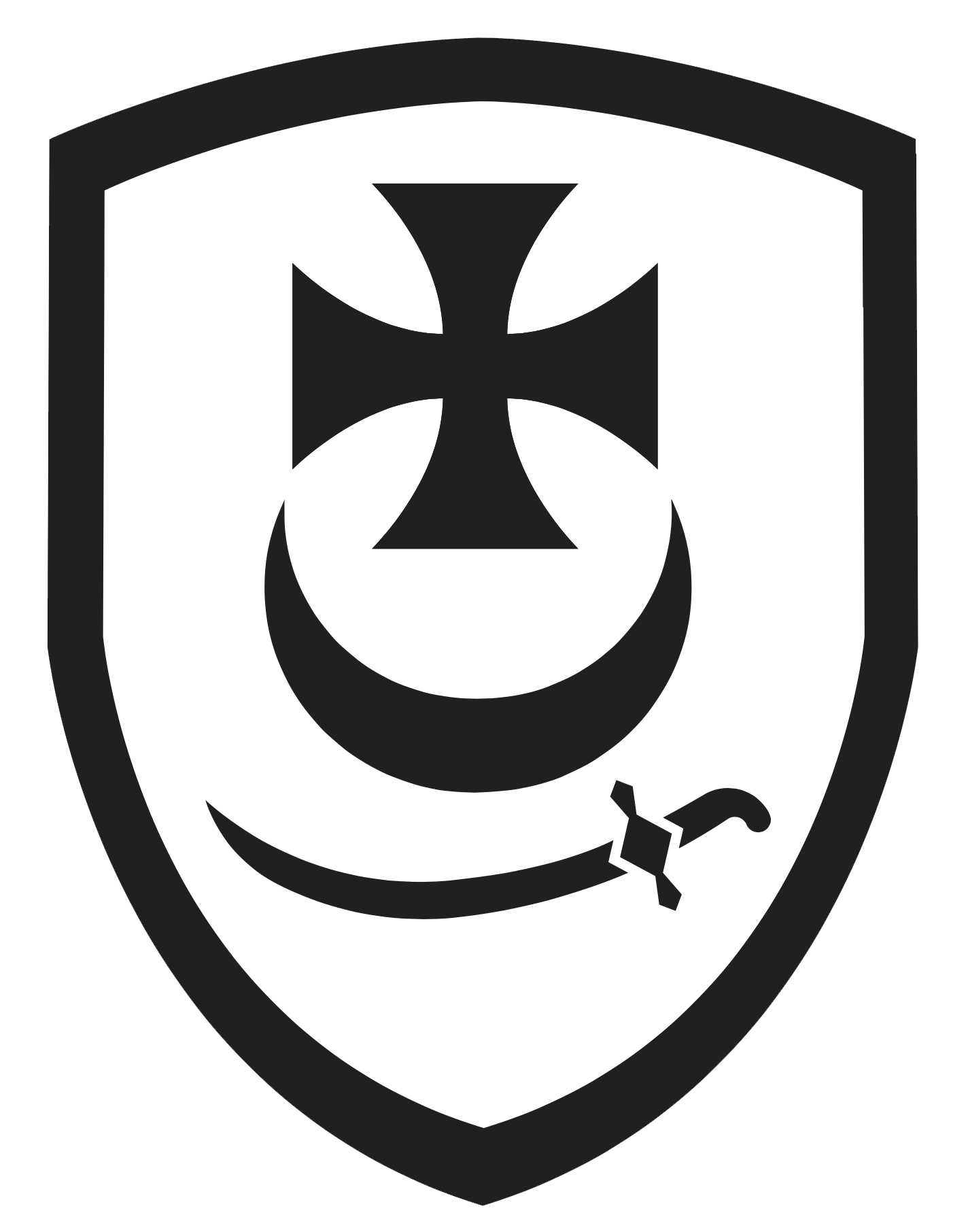
- Old Patch Variant (2023-2025)

The 1st Presidential Brigade of Operational Assignment named after Hetman Petro Doroshenko "Bureviy" (1 БрОП, Unit Number 3027) (Ukrainian: 1-ша бригада оперативного призначення НГ, romanized: 1-sha bryhada operatyvnoho pryznachennia NH) is a unit of the National Guard of Ukraine, and is part of the Northern Operational Zone. The brigade was formed in 2014 in response to the beginning of the War in Donbas.

== History ==
=== War in Donbas ===
On July 27, 2014, the 14th Special Purpose Regiment was reorganized into the 1st Operational Brigade, with significantly improved equipment. It became the first national guard brigade to receive armoured vehicles and howitzers.

The brigade participated in several battles during the War in Donbas, mainly in Krasnyi Lyman and Ilovaisk. During the second battle, the brigade held positions near Komsomolske (now Kalmiuske).

=== Interwar ===
On August 31, 2015, opposition parties organized a rally outside the Verkhovna Rada calling for administrative decentralization, and the 1st Operational Brigade were sent to maintain order. The protest turned violent as grenades were thrown at the brigade's members. More than 50 were wounded and 4 died after the incident.

On August 23, 2017, by Presidential Decree No. 232/2017, the brigade was honored with the title "Presidential Brigade "Hetman Petro Doroshenko"".

On February 17, 2022, the 1st Operational Brigade and the national police took control of the Kyiv Hydroelectric Station.

According to the calculations of the "Book of Remembrance of the Fallen", the brigade lost at least 6 soldiers in the War in Donbas before the full-scale invasion in February 2022.

=== Russian invasion of Ukraine ===
On February 24, 2022, once the Russian invasion of Ukraine began, the 1st Operational Brigade began defending the capital of Kyiv in the Battle of Kyiv. On March 15–16, during the Battle of Moshchun, 6 soldiers from this brigade were killed in action.

After successfully defending Kyiv, the brigade was then transferred to the Battle of Donbas in summer 2022. They participated especially for the major battles in Severodonetsk and Lysychansk. By late 2022, the brigade was then transferred to help the fight in the Battle of Bakhmut.

In January 2023, the brigade became an "Offensive Guard" brigade, used specifically for military offensives. By spring, the brigade was engaged in the defense of Luhansk Oblast, specifically in the village of Bilohorivka. They also fought in the area of the Serebriansky forest near the city of Kreminna.

On March 26, 2024, the 1st Operational Brigade received the honorary award "За мужність та відвагу" by President Volodymyr Zelenskyy.

Units of the brigade, including its "Forpost" and "Khoryv" battalions, operated in the Serebriansky forest in August 2024.

In February and March 2025, the brigade was operating on the Kupiansk front in the Kharkiv Oblast. The brigade continued operating on the Kupiansk front in May.

== Structure ==
- 1st Presidential Operational Brigade named after Hetman Petro Doroshenko "Bureviy"
  - Brigade's Headquarters
  - Kulchitskyi Battalion
    - 1st Company
    - 2nd Company
    - 3rd Company
  - 2nd Battalion of Operational Assignment
  - 1st Guardsmen Battalion
  - 3rd Guardsmen Battalion
  - Artillery Battalion
  - Anti-Aircraft Defense Battalion
  - 1st Operational Battalion "Forpost"
  - 2nd Operational Battalion "Irbis"
  - 3rd Operational Battalion "Groza"
  - 4th Operational Battalion "Khoryv", commander - Colonel Konstantin Vakhrameiev
  - 5th Operational Battalion "Bastion"
  - Unmanned Systems Battalion
  - anti-aircraft UAV battery «Skyfall»
  - артилерійський дивізіон
  - anti-aircraft missile and artillery division
  - tank company
  - Rifle Company (Reserve), 2016
  - Special Forces Sniper Company "Bekas Company"
  - reconnaissance technical equipment unit "Zaichiky Circassia"
  - support battalion
  - motor transport battalion
  - medical company
  - canine company
  - orchestra

== Gallery ==
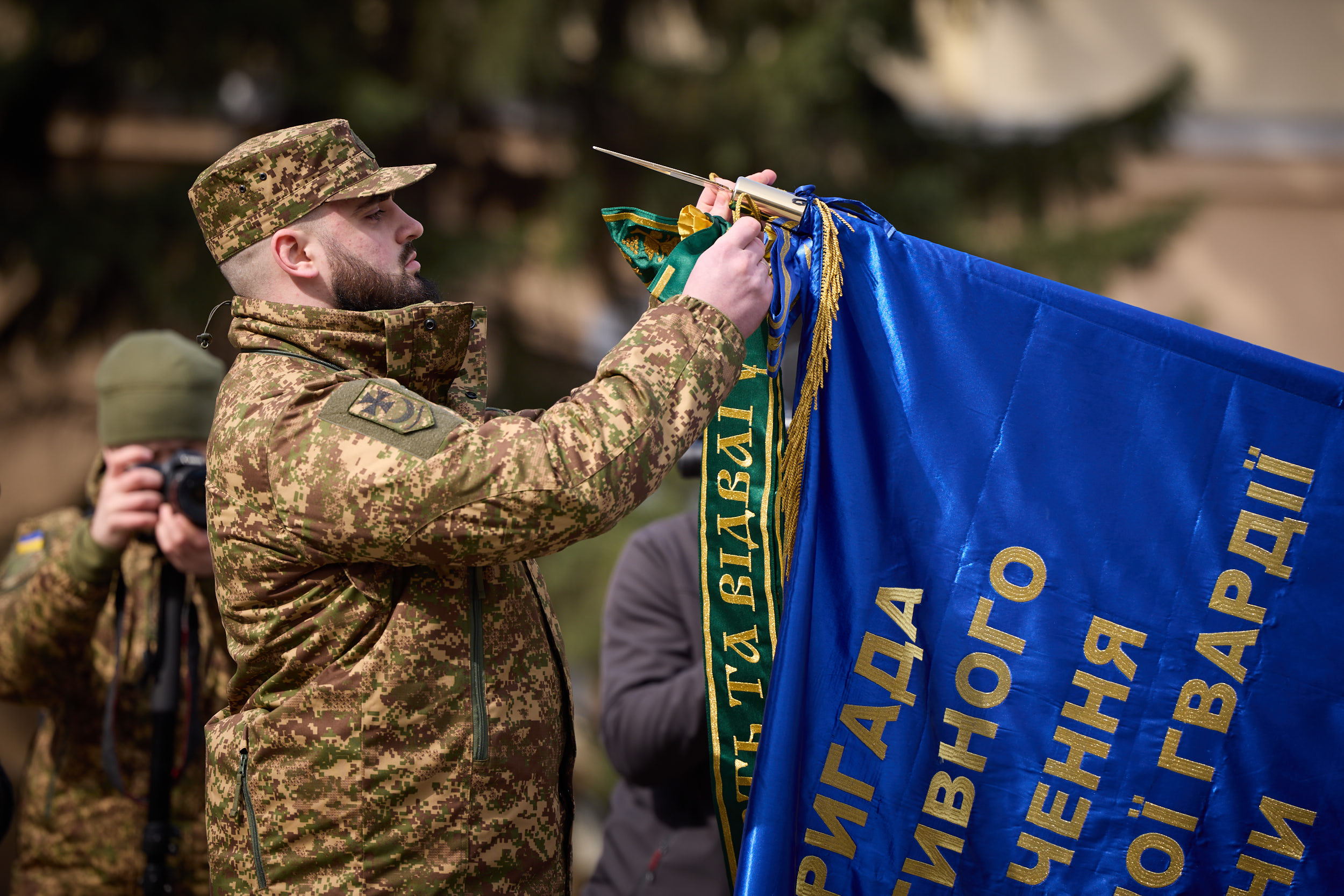
Brigade receiving the For Courage and Bravery ribbon on the 10th anniversary of the National Guard of Ukraine
