= Leonid Kanter =

Ukrainian film director and producer

- Леонід Кантер
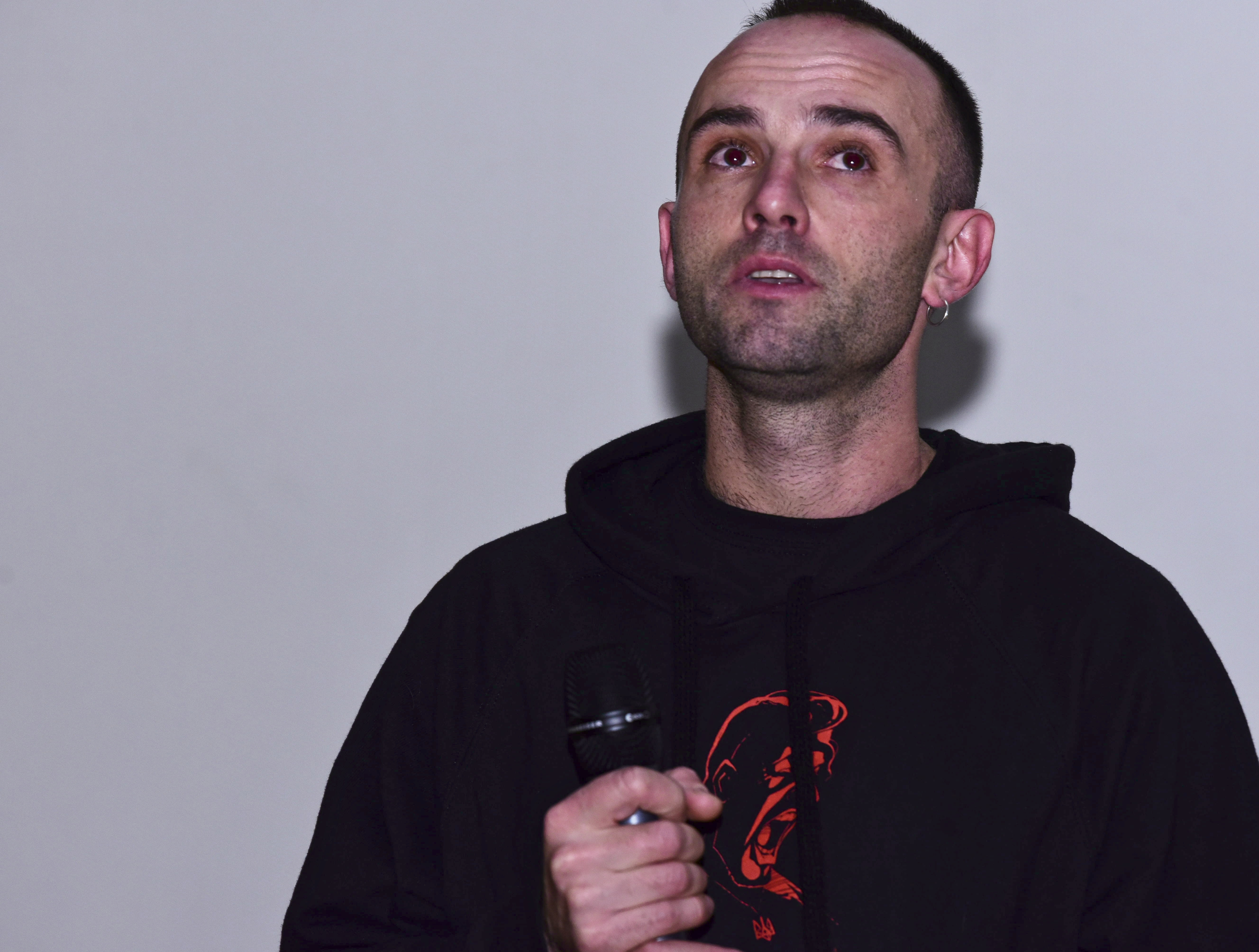
- Kanter at the screening of Myth in Toronto, 2018
- Born: July 27, 1981; Kyiv, Ukraine
- Died: June 4, 2018 (aged 36); Obyrok, Chernihiv Oblast
- Cause of death: Suicide
- Occupation: Documentary filmmaker

Leonid Vilenovych Kanter (Ukrainian: Леонід Віленович Кантер; July 27, 1981 – June 4, 2018) was a Ukrainian documentary filmmaker, writer, and cultural activist. He was best known for his films chronicling the Russo-Ukrainian War and for co-founding the Obyrok art village in northern Ukraine.

== Early life and career ==
Born in Kyiv, Kanter graduated from the Kyiv Natural Science Lyceum No. 145 in 1998 and later studied at the Kyiv National I. K. Karpenko-Kary Theatre, Cinema and Television University.

== Career ==
In 2003, he founded an independent film studio Lizard Films which he directed over 50 short films and several feature-length documentaries. In 2007, he founded the Obyrok art village, a space for artists and cultural events, in Chernihiv.

In 2014, he co-directed War at Our Own Expense, a documentary highlighting the experiences and inadequate provisions for soldiers of National Guard of Ukraine. At the time of shooting, Kanter was enlisted as a volunteer of the 2nd Battalion of National Guard. Later, he left military service and chose to focus on documentary filmmaking. This was followed by The Ukrainians (2015), which depicted volunteer fighters defending Donetsk Airport. The documentary featured wide-angled footage of the battle at the airport alongside testimonies from soldiers of the Ukrainian Volunteer Corps. His final film, Myth (2018), co-directed with Ivan Yasniy, chronicled the life of Vasyl Slipak, a Ukrainian opera singer who left his career in France to volunteer with the Ukrainian army and was killed in the war in Donbas.

== Death ==
On June 4, 2018, Kanter was found dead in Obyrok from a gunshot wound to the head. Authorities ruled his death a suicide, citing a note found at the scene. He is survived by his wife and three children.
