= Battle of Kyiv (2022) =

Battle in the Russian invasion of Ukraine

Coordinates: 50.40°N 30.54°E

- Part of the Kyiv offensive of the Russian invasion of Ukraine
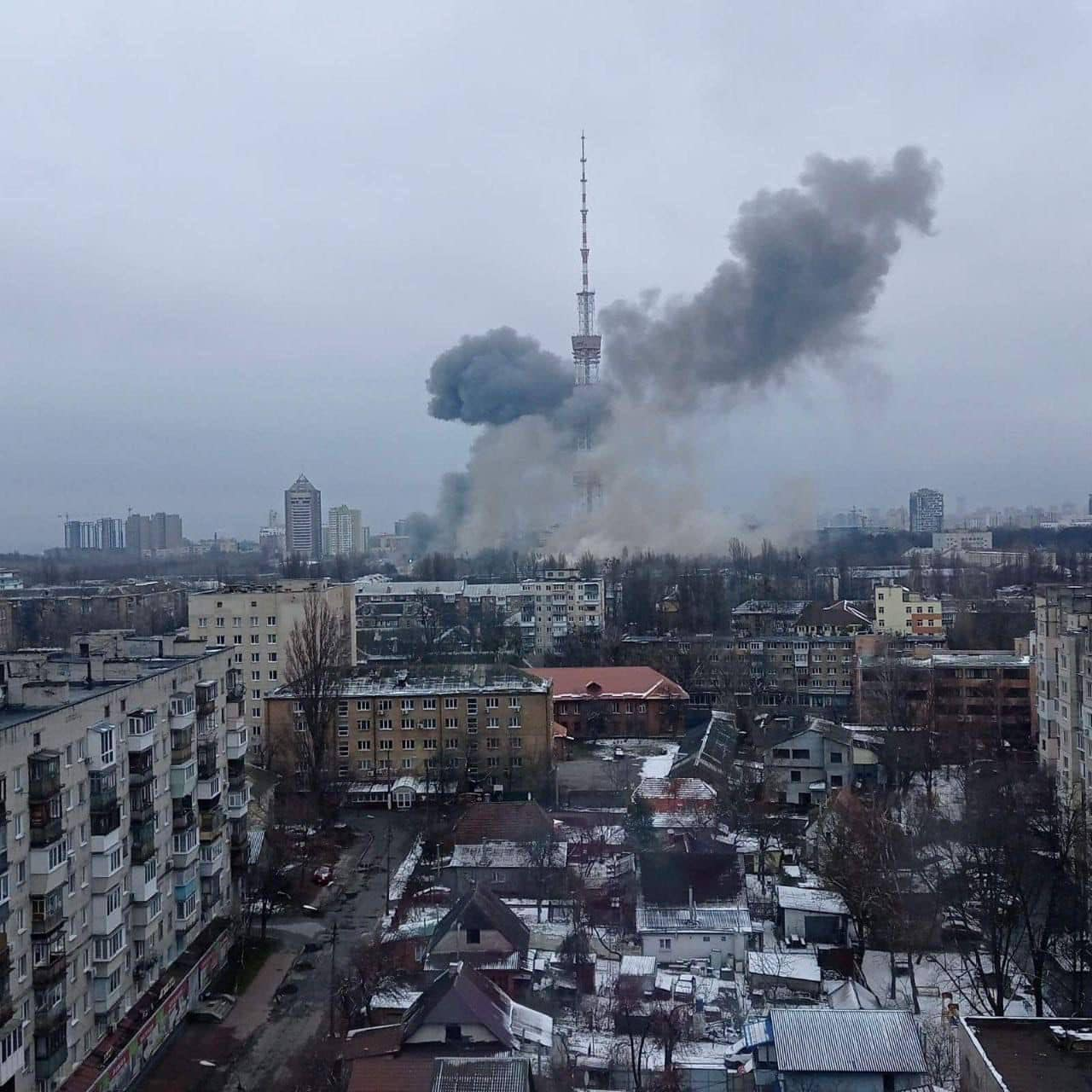
- Russian bombardment of the Kyiv TV Tower in Kyiv, 1 March 2022
Date	24 February – 2 April 2022 (1 month, 1 week and 2 days)
Location	Kyiv, Ukraine
Result	Ukrainian victory

Belligerents
Russia	Ukraine

Commanders and leaders
	(Ukraine) Oleksandr Syrskyi (Ukraine) Vitali Klitschko

Units involved
Russian Armed Forces; Russian Ground Forces; 37th Guards Motor Rifle Brigade; Russian Airborne Forces; 104th Guards Air Assault Regiment; Special Operations Forces; Russian Air Force; National Guard of Russia: 141st Special Motorized Regiment; PMC Redut	Armed Forces of Ukraine; Ukrainian Ground Forces; 72nd Mechanized Brigade; 101st Brigade for the Protection of the General Staff; Sheikh Mansur Battalion; Dzhokhar Dudayev Battalion; Ukrainian Air Force; 40th Tactical Aviation Brigade; Territorial Defense Forces; 112th Territorial Defense Brigade; International Legion; National Guard of Ukraine; Pechersk Brigade; Azov Special Operations Detachment; Ukrainian Police; Special Police Forces; Irregular units

Strength
15,000–30,000 soldiers 700+ military vehicles	Undisclosed regular soldiers 18,000+ irregular forces

Casualties and losses
Unknown, presumed heavy Four planes shot down	162 soldiers killed, 748 wounded (Ukrainian claim); 1 Sukhoi Su-27 fighter aircraft shot down
- 89 civilians killed ~2 million civilians evacuated

The Battle of Kyiv was part of the Kyiv offensive in the Russian invasion of Ukraine for control of Kyiv, the capital city of Ukraine, and surrounding districts including Hostomel Airport. The combatants were elements of the Russian Armed Forces and Ukrainian Armed Forces. The battle lasted from 24 February 2022 to 2 April 2022 and ended with the withdrawal of Russian forces.

Initially, Russian forces captured key areas to the north and west of Kyiv, leading to international predictions of the city's imminent fall. However, stiff Ukrainian resistance sapped Russian momentum. Poor Russian logistics and tactical decisions helped the defenders to thwart efforts at encirclement, and, after a month of protracted fighting, Ukrainian forces began counterattacking.

Following the successful Ukrainian counterattacks in late March, Russia began withdrawing its forces from the Kyiv area on 29 March. Four days later, the Ukrainian authorities declared that Kyiv and the surrounding Kyiv Oblast were again under Ukrainian control.

== First Russian attack (24–27 February 2022) ==
Russian forces engaged Ukrainian troops at Hostomel Airport on 24 February 2022. A key supply point for Russian troops near Kyiv, the airport, located in Hostomel, a town northwest of the city, was captured the following day.

=== Russian infiltration and initial Ukrainian mobilization ===
On 24 February, Russian troops parachuted into Kyiv in an effort to kill or capture the Ukrainian president Volodymyr Zelenskyy and his family. Street battles followed and the presidential compound was barricaded, while Russian paratroopers made two attempts to storm the compound.

On the morning of 25 February, three Russian saboteurs, dressed as Ukrainian soldiers, entered Obolonskyi District, 10 kilometres (6 mi) north of the Verkhovna Rada building, the seat of the parliament of Ukraine. They were killed by Ukrainian forces. According to a later claim, the "saboteurs" could in fact have been Ukrainian soldiers from the 72nd Mechanized Brigade, who were mistaken for Russian troops. Several hours later, a Ukrainian Sukhoi Su-27 fighter aircraft piloted by Colonel Oleksandr Oksanchenko was shot down over the city and crashed into an apartment building. Throughout the day, gunfire was heard at several areas of the city. Ukrainian officials described the gunfire as arising from clashes with Russian forces. There was heavy gunfire in the city during the night. Ukrainian forces later claimed to have killed around 60 Russian saboteurs.

=== Escalation ===
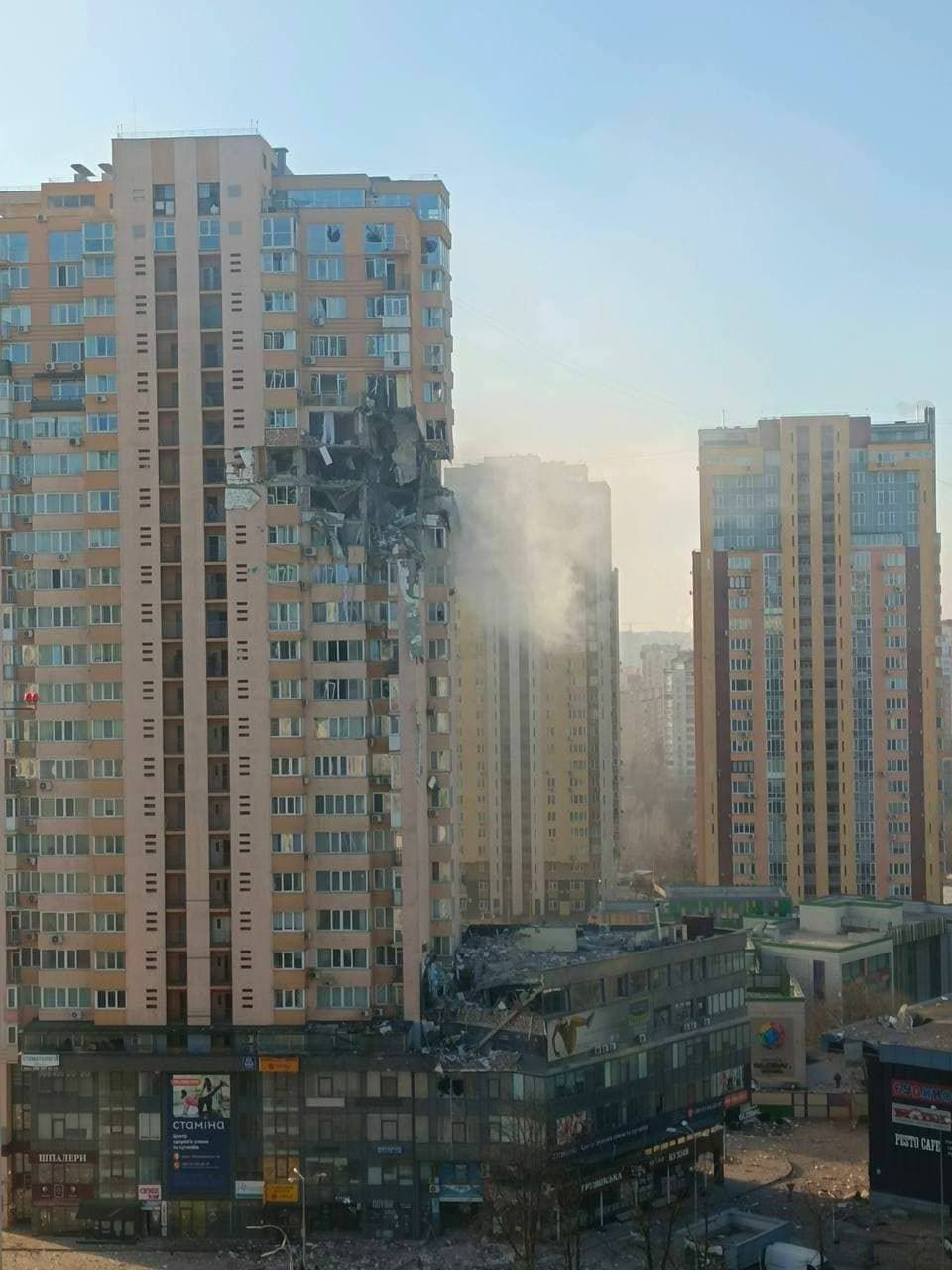
Aftermath of the missile strike on an apartment block in Kyiv on 26 February 2022

On the morning of 26 February, Russian artillery shelled the city for more than 30 minutes. Concurrently, Ukrainian forces repelled an attack on a power plant in the northeastern neighborhood of Troieshchyna. The attack was suggested to be a Russian attempt to cut off Kyiv's electricity supply. Heavy fighting occurred near Kyiv Zoo, where Ukrainian forces defended an army base on Prospect Peremohy. This accident, as well as a shootout on the nearby junction with Povitroflotskyi Avenue, which took place on the evening of 26 February, were later clarified to have been friendly fire accidents. According to Zelenskyy, Ukrainian forces managed to repel a Russian offensive and continued to hold Kyiv and its surrounding areas. A curfew was imposed from 17:00 to 08:00, and violators were to be considered to be saboteurs. According to the British Ministry of Defence, Russian forces were 31 kilometres (19 mi) from the city center.

On 27 February, clashes between Ukrainian forces and Russian saboteurs continued, whilst local officials remained adamant that the city was still under full Ukrainian control. Later that morning, a rocket fell and exploded in the courtyard of a 16-story high rise building in Troieshchyna, destroying several cars. Ukrainian officials allege that the missile was fired from Belarus. By the evening, the Associated Press reported that mayor of Kyiv, Vitali Klitschko had stated the city was encircled, which was subsequently clarified in The Kyiv Independent by his spokesperson as a mistake. The report has since been classified as false information.

During the night, a Russian military convoy attempted to set up a temporary base at Syrets Metro, which was met with a deadly confrontation with Ukrainian troops. Russian troops also fired at a Ukrainian military bus, resulting in an indeterminate number of casualties.

=== Civilian responses ===
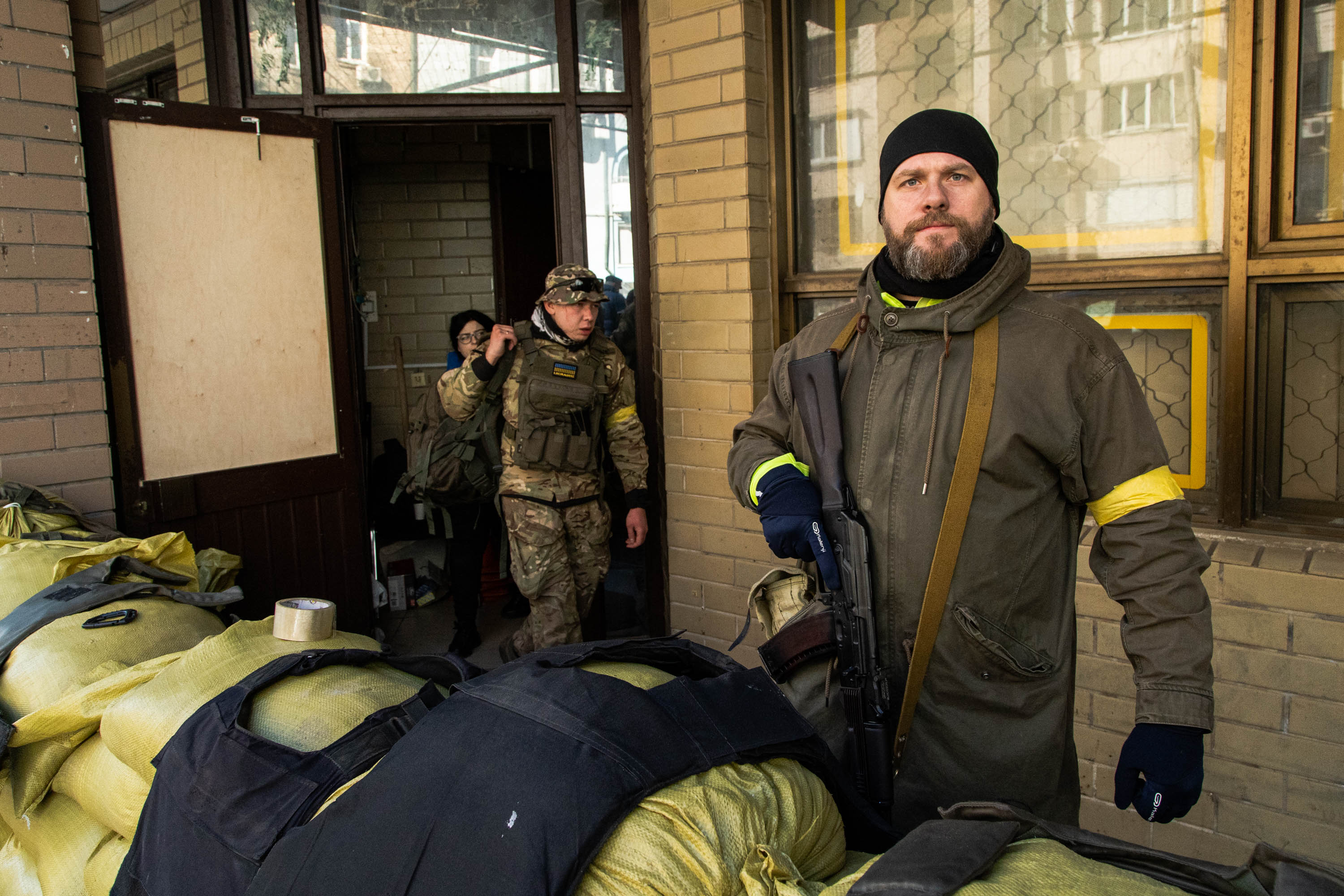
Territorial Defense Forces troops in Kyiv, 25 February

During the start of the attack, Klitschko vowed to take up arms and fight. Zelenskyy urged citizens of Kyiv to respond to the Russian assault with improvised attacks using Molotov cocktails. Residents were warned to avoid windows and balconies. 18,000 guns were distributed amongst citizens during the first day of the battle, while the Ukrainian Territorial Defense Forces, normally kept in reserve, were activated upon the start of the attack.

On 26 February, Ukrainian interior minister Denys Monastyrsky announced that civilian volunteers in Kyiv had been given more than 25,000 assault rifles, and approximately 10 million bullets, as well as rocket-propelled grenades and rocket launchers.

== Second Russian attack ==
=== Russian convoy and continuous shelling ===
On 28 February, a fresh wave of Russian troops advanced towards Kyiv, but little direct combat occurred, with only three missiles being fired at the city that day. Satellite images revealed the existence of a long column of Russian vehicles heading to Kyiv along a 64-kilometre-long (40 mi) highway approaching from the north, approximately 39 km (24 mi) from the city center. Ukrainian soldiers killed an Israeli-Ukrainian citizen at a checkpoint, mistaking him for a Chechen member of the Russian army.

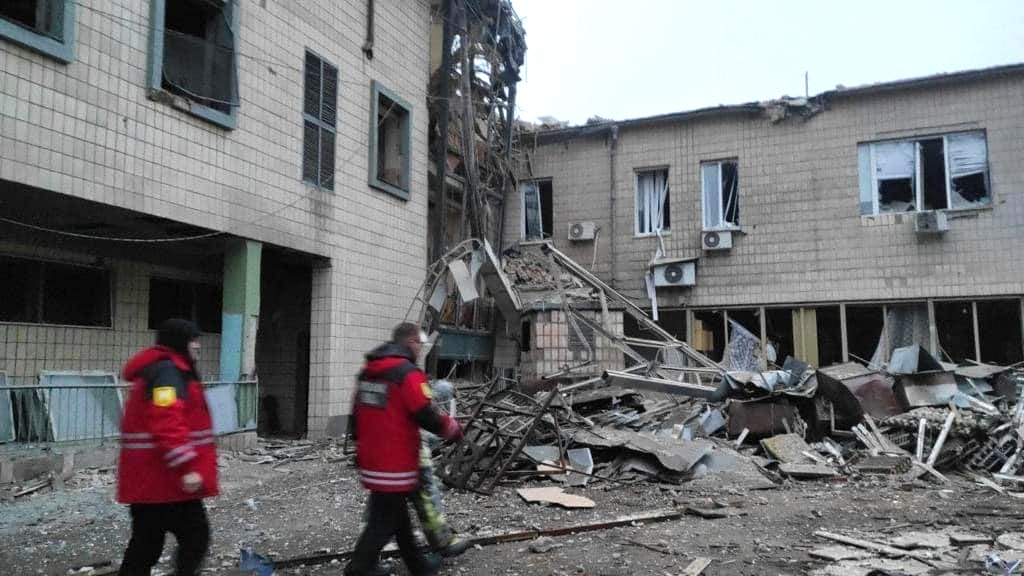
A building in Kyiv destroyed by Russian shelling

Rocket strike on Kyiv TV Tower, 1 March

On the morning of 1 March, the Russian Ministry of Defense issued an emergency evacuation notice to local civilians stating that they intended to target Ukrainian transmission facilities around Kyiv and that all nearby residents should leave. Hours later, a Russian missile struck the Kyiv TV Tower, killing five people and injuring five others. The attack severed all television transmissions in Kyiv. Meanwhile, the Babi Yar Holocaust Memorial Center confirmed an accidental hit by a second missile intended for the tower on a memorial dedicated for the Babi Yar Massacre. A Russian airstrike also struck and damaged an occupied maternity clinic. Further Russian shelling struck the neighborhoods of Rusanivka and Kurenivka and the suburbs of Boyarka and Vyshneve, as well as the area around Kyiv International Airport. (Note: It is unclear whether this is Kyiv International Airport (Zhuliany) or Boryspil International Airport.)

That day, Klitschko banned the sales of alcohol in Kyiv while appealing to shop owners and pharmacy chains not to “take advantage” of the situation by raising the prices of "food, essential goods and medicines".

=== Encirclement efforts of Kyiv ===
In the early morning of 2 March, the Ukrainian Air Force claimed it had shot down two Russian Sukhoi Su-35 fighter aircraft over Kyiv. Later in the morning, Klitschko stated that the Russian army was beginning to surround the city in an attempt to enforce a blockade. Klitschko told Channel 24 that tanks were approaching Kyiv from Belarus and that Ukrainian authorities were inspecting Ukrainian checkpoints for preparedness. The Estonian Defence Forces intelligence chief estimated that the advancing Russian convoy would arrive to Kyiv's outer suburbs in at least two days, after which they would try to lay siege to the city. Polish president Andrzej Duda said Zelenskyy had told him that Ukrainian forces would not withdraw from Kyiv. Ukrainian general Oleksandr Syrskyi stated in an interview in June that Russian forces had attempted to storm Kyiv through its major highways, so Ukrainian forces set up two rings of forces along the city—an outer circle in the suburbs, and an inner one in downtown Kyiv.

On the night of 24 February, the city was divided by the Ukrainian armed forces into sectors, with generals assigned to each one, following a chain of command leading up to Syrskyi. All of Kyiv Oblast's aviation capabilities had been moved to different locations a week before the invasion. The 72nd Mechanized Brigade was the only tank brigade that could defend the capital.

Debris from an intercepted Russian rocket fell on the Kyiv-Pasazhyrskyi railway station, damaging a major heating pipeline. The resulting explosion caused minor damage to the station.

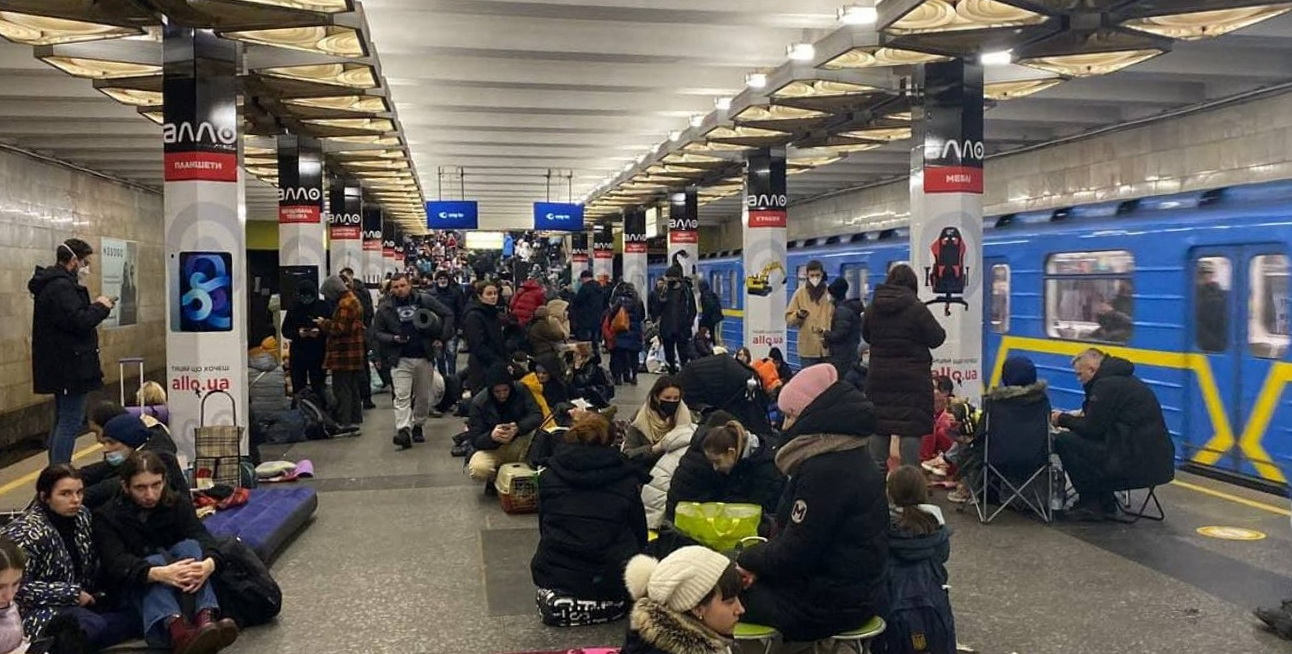
A Kyiv Metro station being used as an air raid shelter by civilians

On 3 March, The New York Times estimated that over 15,000 people were sheltering in the city's subway. The UK Ministry of Defence stated that over the past three days the advancing Russian convoy had made "little discernable progress" going forward. The following day, a wave of shelling struck downtown Kyiv, including the Borshchahivka neighbourhood. A CNN investigation found that the strikes had hit a business center and multi-story buildings in the western areas of the city. On 7 March, Ukrainian authorities claimed Ukrainian forces had destroyed two Russian aircraft. Later, Zelenskyy denied rumors that he had fled the city, insisting that he intended to stay in Kyiv.

The attempt by the Russians to encircle Kyiv failed. Later, on 22 March, Ukrainian forces retook Makariv, effectively halting any potential blockade of the city.

== Russian offensive stalls ==
On 8 March, CIA director William J. Burns stated, "Instead of seizing Kyiv within the first two days of the campaign, which is what [Putin's] plan was premised upon, after nearly two full weeks they still have not been able to fully encircle the city." Ukrainian-born U.S. military analyst Michael Kofman commented, "At the outset [the Russian Armed Forces] thought they could introduce units very quickly into the capital Kyiv (...). The assumptions were ridiculous... how could you take Kyiv in three days?", adding that Moscow had already adjusted its strategy to a combined arms operation, seemingly to address this unexpected early failure. In response to the difficulties in the offensive, The Guardian reported that the Russian forces were attempting to overcome the stalled offensive's logistical problems.

The following morning, Russian forces shelled the city again. Later that day, Russian and Ukrainian authorities agreed to make a temporary humanitarian corridor around Kyiv, resulting in the mass evacuation of civilians from the suburbs. On 10 March, Klitschko stated that nearly two million people, half of the population of Kyiv, had fled the city since the war began.

On 12 March, a Russian loitering munition, identified as a ZALA Kub-BLA, was shot down over the Podil neighborhood, causing a fire in the State Savings Bank of Ukraine building. Another fire occurred on Synioozerna Street in the northwestern edge of the city.

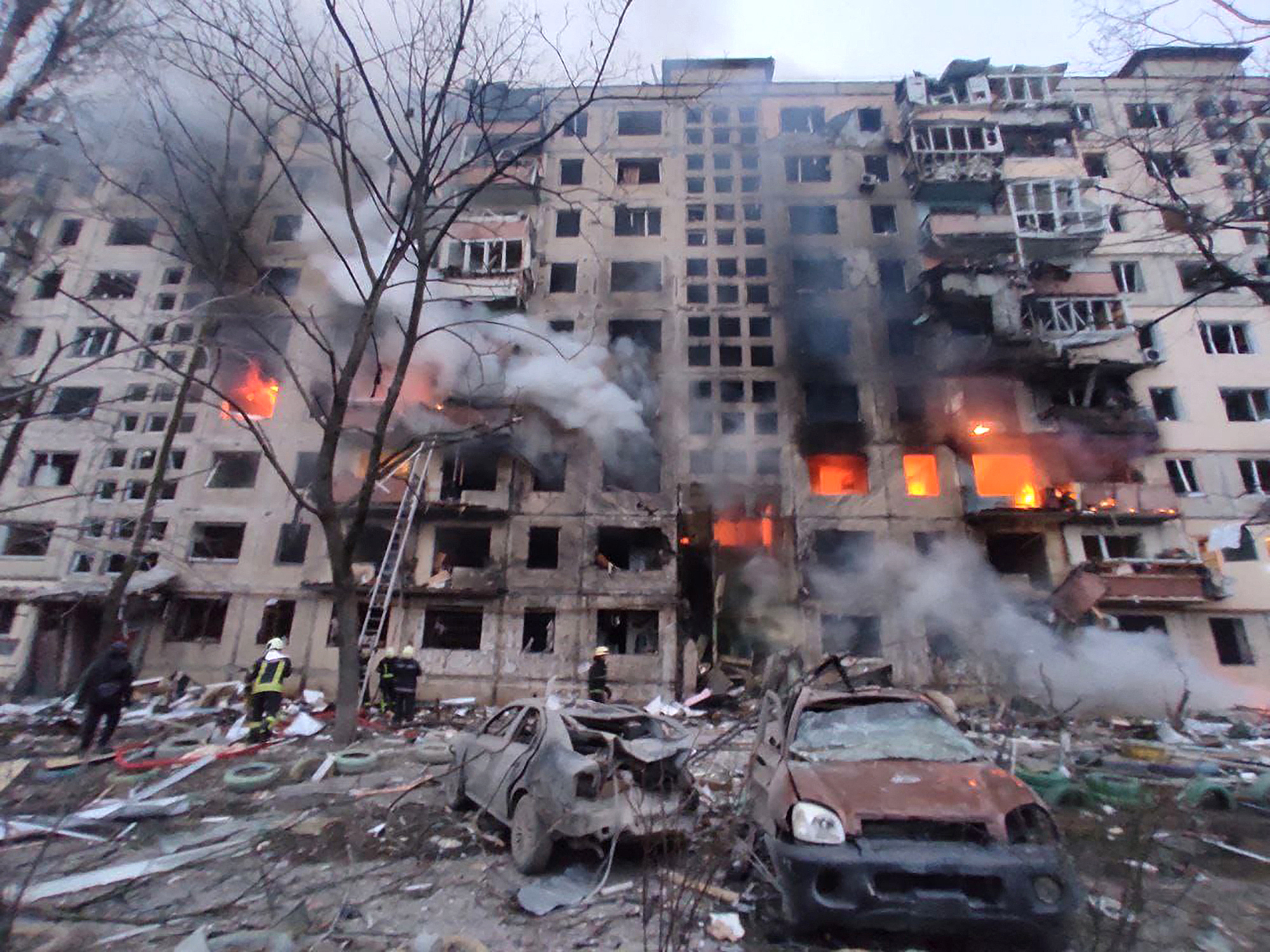
Destroyed building on Bohatyrska Street, 14 March

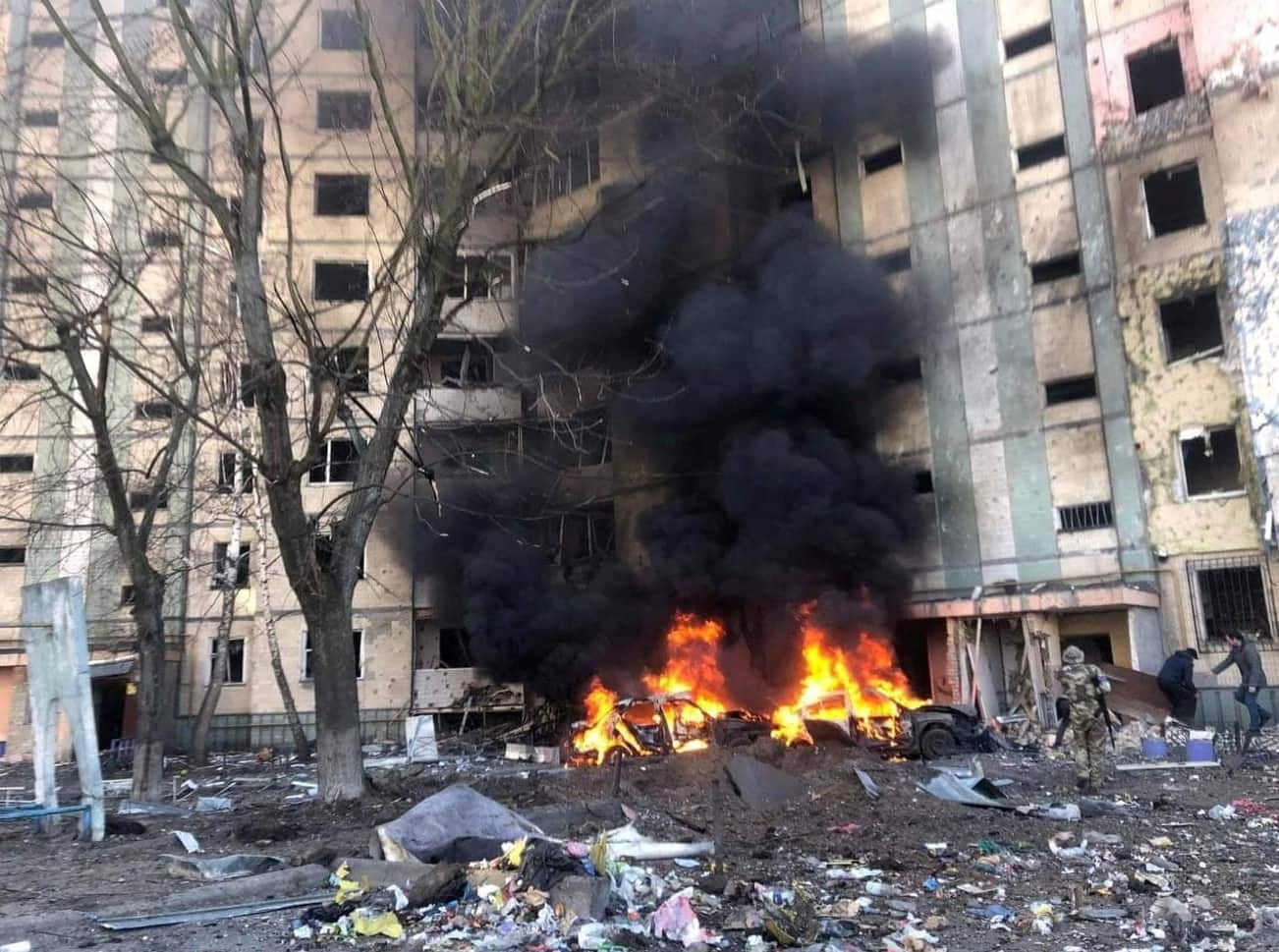
A building in the Sviatoshynskyi District damaged on 20 March

On the morning of 14 March, a Russian shell struck a 9-story residential building on Bohatyrska Street in Obolon. The building was partially destroyed, with at least one person killed and 12 wounded. Another Russian rocket was shot down over Kyiv, with its fragments damaging a 5-story residential building in Kurenivka, killing one person. In addition, Russian forces fired three rockets at the Antonov Serial Production Plant, injuring seven people.

Meanwhile, city officials stated that they were stockpiling two weeks of food for residents who had stayed behind.

The Lukianivska metro station was damaged due to a blast the next morning. Later in the morning, Russian forces shelled residential areas, including the Sviatoshynski, Podilskyi and Osokorky districts, setting multiple buildings ablaze. Four people were killed by shelling in Sviatoshynskyi. That day, an EU delegation visited Kyiv and subsequently met with Zelenskyy, who urged other leaders to follow suit.

On 17 March, Zelenskyy visited a Kyiv hospital to meet the people wounded while evacuating from Kyiv Region.

A shopping centre in Podilskyi was destroyed by a Russian missile on 20 March, killing at least eight people. The explosion damaged nearby buildings and destroyed cars. Russian officials claimed that Ukrainian forces were using areas near the shopping centre to store munitions, and provided drone footage of what the Ministry described as a Ukrainian Multiple rocket launcher firing and moving back to the shopping centre, before being destroyed by a Russian missile. In Sviatoshynskyi, fragments of a missile fell on a residential area. According to local officials, six houses and four schools were damaged; about 200 people had to be evacuated. A curfew was announced from 21:00 on 21 March until 07:00.

== Ukrainian counteroffensive and Russian withdrawal ==
On 22 March, Ukrainian forces launched a counter-offensive to drive the Russians from the city. Ukrainian forces evacuated thousands of people from nearby suburbs and settlements, including 20,000 people in Boryspil.

Russian forces unleashed a new wave of bombardment on 24 March. Shelling hit a parking lot in the north of the city, killing the Russian journalist Oksana Baulina and wounding two people. That day, a delegation of Baltic parliament speakers visited Kyiv.

A British intelligence report on 25 March said that Ukraine had retaken towns as far as 35 kilometres (22 mi) from the city as Russian forces began to run out of supplies. The Russian military claimed it had successfully destroyed the largest major oil terminal in the country, which was close to Kyiv. Following the successful Ukrainian counterattacks in late March, Russia announced it was withdrawing its forces from the Kyiv area on 29 March. Taking Kyiv was deemed to be a key objective and their failure to take it was viewed as setback for the campaign. On 1 April, EU parliament president Roberta Metsola visited Kyiv, becoming the first EU top official to travel to Ukraine since the start of the invasion. On 2 April, Ukrainian authorities announced that the entire Kyiv region had been recaptured. That day, Klitschko relaxed the prohibition of alcohol sales in shops.

== Aftermath ==
Without admitting defeat, Russian invasion forces retreated from Kyiv, Sumy and Chernihiv oblasts. International media outlets reported jubilation among the civilian population in the capital and other areas from which the Russians retreated. The discovery of Russian war crimes committed during the offensive, particularly in Bucha, led to additional rounds of sanctions against Russia and pledges of further military aid to Ukraine.

For international military observers, the retreat was a surprise upset that dispelled notions of a quick Russian victory and showcased Ukraine's resilience, as well as unexpected weaknesses in the Russian military. On 30 March, following the withdrawal, a Pentagon spokesperson stated that the U.S. Department of Defense believed that taking Kyiv "was a key objective" if one "[looks] at what they were doing in those early days. They wanted Kyiv. And they didn't get it." The Institute for the Study of War wrote in its 3 April campaign assessment, "The continued existence of an independent Ukrainian state with its capital in Kyiv is no longer in question at this time, although much fighting remains and the war could still turn Russia's way."

On 14 June 2024 Russian president Putin claimed that "Russian troops were near Kyiv in March 2022", but "There was no political decision to storm the three-million-strong city; it was a coercive operation to establish peace."

== See also ==
- Aerorozvidka
- List of attacks on Kyiv during the Russian invasion of Ukraine
