= Special forces of Ukraine =

Ukrainian special operation units

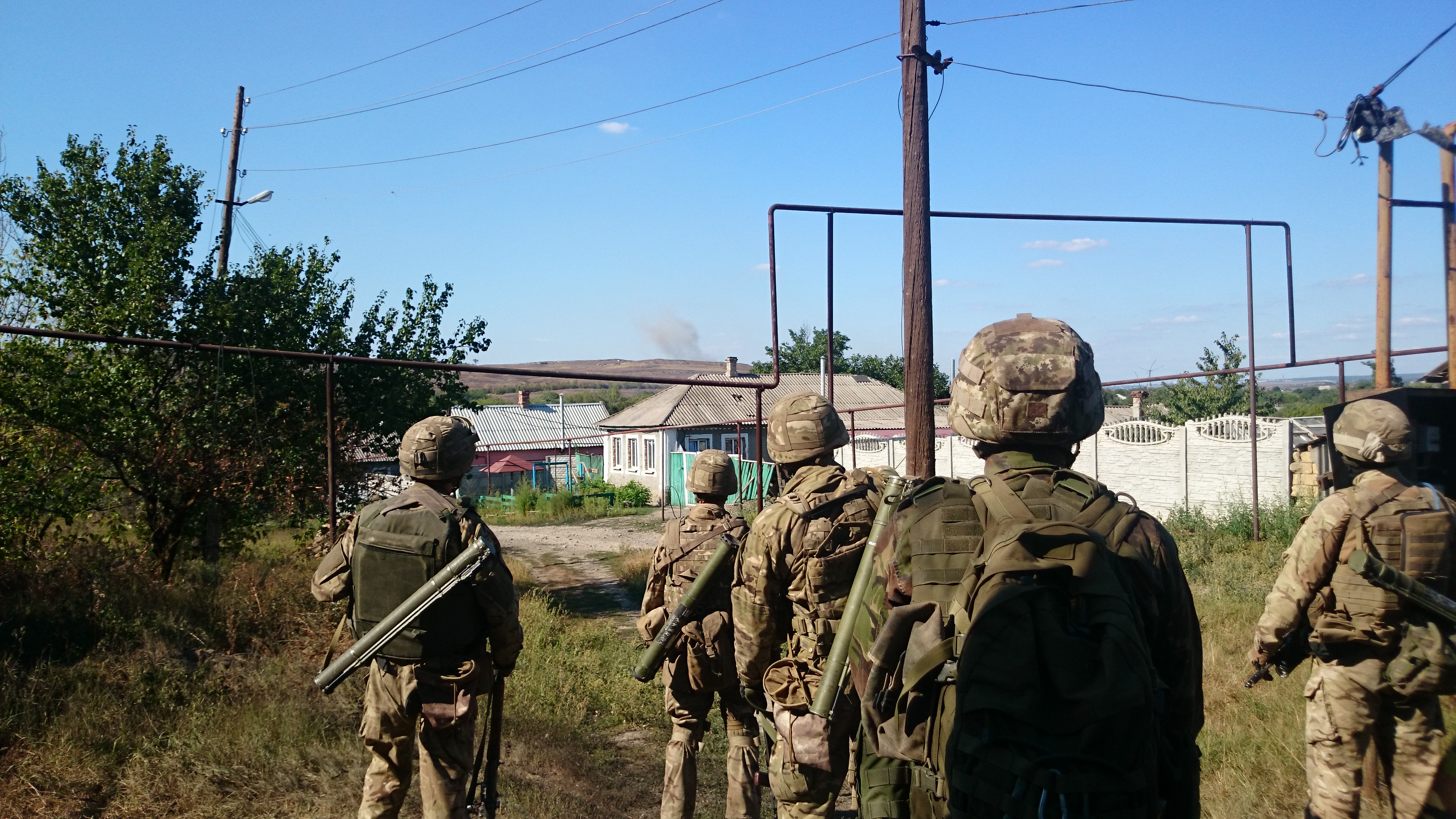
8th Separate Special Purpose Regiment enters a settlement in Donbas during the war in eastern Ukraine in 2014

Ukraine inherited its special forces (spetspryz) units from the remnants of the Soviet Armed Forces, GRU and KGB units. Ukraine now maintains its own Spetsnaz structure under the control of the Ministry of Internal Affairs and under the Ministry of Defence, while the Security Service of Ukraine maintains its own Spetsnaz force, the Alpha Group. In 2016 the Special Operations Forces were created as an independent branch of the Armed Forces of Ukraine formed only by special forces units.

== Active units ==
Emblem of Special Operations Branch

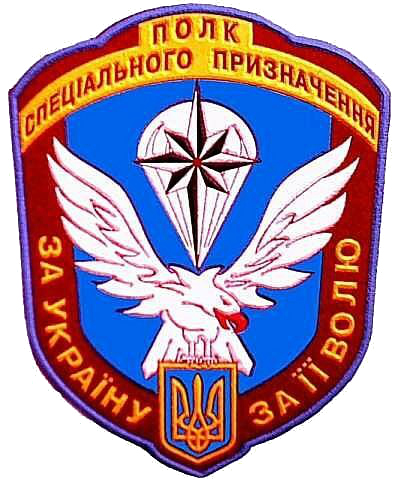
8th Special Purpose Regiment shoulder sleeve insignia

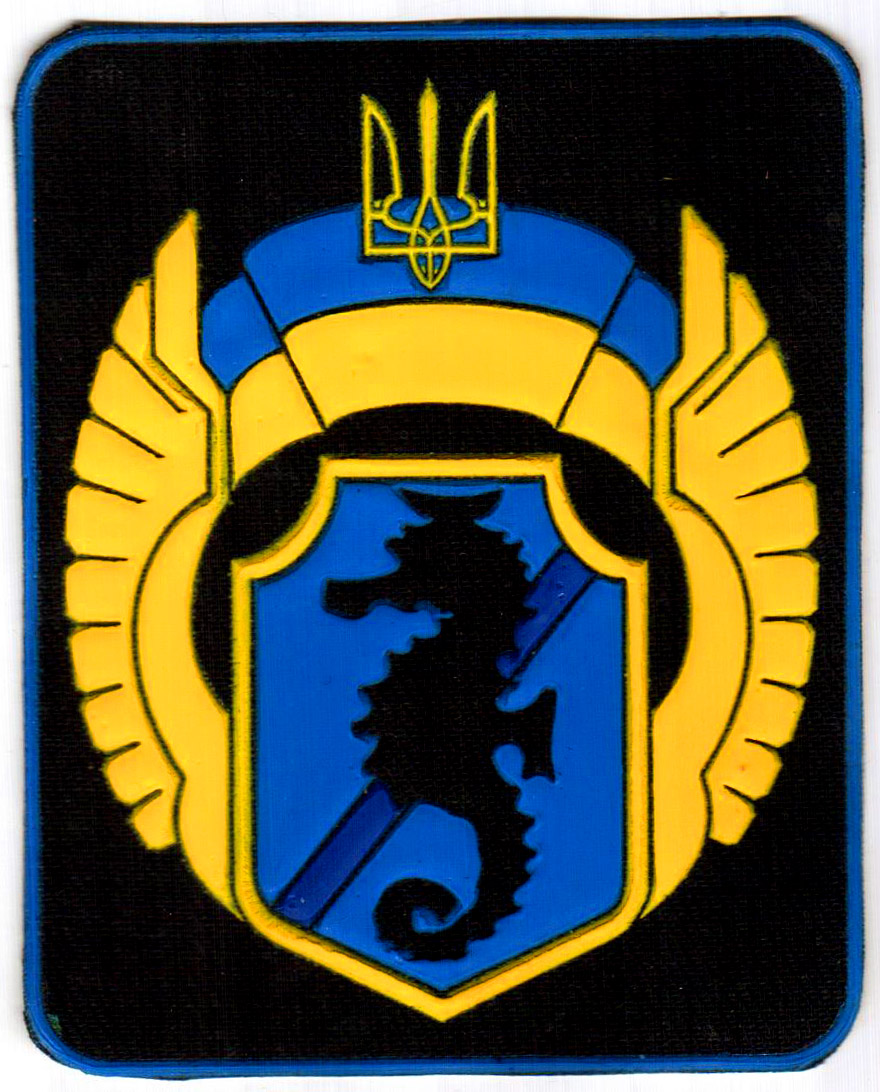
73rd Naval Special Operations Center shoulder sleeve insignia

=== Armed Forces of Ukraine ===
The Special Operations Forces (SSO) are one of the eight branches of the Armed Forces of Ukraine. By 2014, Special Forces Command numbers over 4,000 operatives, all of whom were professional soldiers. In 2021, the end strength of the SSO was increased by 1,000 troops.

- Special Forces Command, Kyiv
  - 99th Staff and Support Battalion, Berdychiv
  - 3rd Separate Special Purpose Regiment, Kropyvnytskyi
    - HQ staff
    - 1st Special Purpose Detachment
    - 2nd Special Purpose Detachment
    - 3rd Special Purpose Detachment
    - Maintenance Unit
    - Signals Unit
  - 8th Separate Special Purpose Regiment, Khmelnytskyi
    - HQ staff
    - 1st Special Purpose Detachment
    - 2nd Special Purpose Detachment
    - 3rd Special Purpose Detachment
    - 4th Special Purpose Detachment
    - Maintenance Unit
    - Signals Unit
  - 73rd Naval Special Operations Center, Ochakiv
    - 1st Underwater demolitions Unit
    - 2nd Clearance diver Unit
    - 3rd Reconnaissance Unit
    - Logistics Unit
  - 140th Separate Special Purpose Center, Khmelnytskyi
  - 142nd Training Center, Berdychiv
  - 16th Informational-Psychological Operations Center, Huiva
  - 72nd Informational-Psychological Operations Center, Brovary
  - 74th Informational-Psychological Operations Center, Lviv
  - 83rd Informational-Psychological Operations Center, Odesa
- Rukh Oporu
- International Legion of Ukraine
  - 3rd Special Purpose Battalion

=== Special units of the National Guard of Ukraine ===
Many former special designated units of the Internal Troops of the Ministry of Internal Affairs of Ukraine have been disbanded or converted into "Operational" (combat) or "Public Security Protection and Patrol" units (police) units. After reorganization, the following special purpose units are active within the National Guard:

- 18th Operational Regiment (Reinforced), Mariupol
  - 1st Patrol Battalion
  - 2nd Special Purpose Battalion "Donbas", Mariupol
  - Azov Assault Brigade", Mariupol
  - Special Patrol Company, Mariupol
- "Scorpion" Special Forces Detachment, Kyiv, tasked with guarding Ukraine's nuclear industry
- "Omega" Special Forces Anti-terrorism Detachment, Novi Petrivtsi
- "Typhoon Unit (Ukraine)" Special UAV Detachment, Kyiv

=== Security Service of Ukraine ===
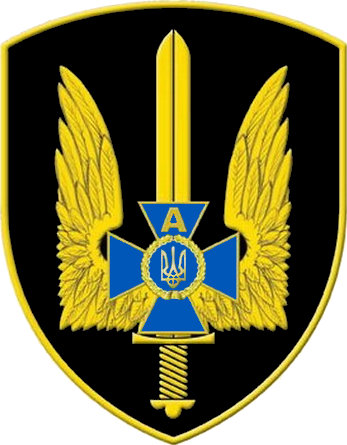
The badge of the SBU Alfa Group

The Security Service of Ukraine (SBU) maintains its own elite special forces unit called Alpha Group which was created from the Kyiv territorial unit of the Soviet era Alpha Group where it became Service "C" of the SBU in 1992.

The date of the creation of an Alpha detachment in Ukraine is 3 March 1990. That's when the order was given to the chief of the 7th Directorate of the KGB to establish 10th group (Kyiv) Group 'A' Services EIR 7th Directorate of the KGB. The term 'Alpha' is also used by many other post-Soviet states (such as Russia, Belarus and Kazakhstan), as these units are based on the Soviet Union's Alpha Group. The selection process was rigorous. Of the initial 120 KGB candidates, only 15 passed the rigorous selection course to establish the first detachment under the leadership of commander Peter Zakrevskii.

=== State Border Guard Service of Ukraine ===
- 10th Mobile Border Detachment

=== National Police of Ukraine ===
- Rapid Operational Response Unit

== Former special forces units ==
=== Berkut special purpose police force ===
Berkut emblem

Ukraine's Berkut ("eagle"), a special police force, was perhaps the nation's most well known Spetsnaz unit and served under the Ministry of Internal Affairs until its dissolution in 2014. Following the annexation of Crimea, the Russian Ministry of Internal Affairs absorbed the Crimean Berkut unit.

The force came to worldwide attention during the Ukraine without Kuchma riots, as well as the 2014 Ukrainian Revolution. Berkut was essentially a successor to the OMON special police units of the Soviet Union and was analogous to SWAT teams in the United States. A Berkut unit was stationed in most cities of regional significance. The unit specialized in riot control and tactical law enforcement. Due to Berkut units being stationed in most regions of Ukraine, the term became synonymous with Spetsnaz or law enforcement and many special police units were referred to by the name.

Berkut had been accused of excessive brutality, intimidation, and being involved in various criminal activity throughout its history. Some examples include:

- 23–25 June 1995 — Assaulted Crimean Tatars near Sudak (Crimea) and helped criminals to escape angry crowd
- 18 July 1995, "Black Tuesday" — Prevented burial of Patriarch Volodymyr (Kyiv)
- 24 August 1998 (Independence Day) — Violent dispersal of a peaceful protest by coal miners for not having been paid for two and a half years in Luhansk (governor of Luhansk Oblast - Oleksandr Yefremov)
- November 2000 — March 2001, Ukraine without Kuchma — Protected government from angry crowd
- 19 August 2013 — Attacked a parliamentarian during the 2013 Kyiv political protests near city hall
- Beginning 22 November 2013, attacked protesters of the Euromaidan
- 23 January 2014 — Kidnapped Alexandra Haylak, a 22-year-old volunteer of the Euromaidan medical service, stripped her of all identification, and left her in the woods near Vyshhorod
- 23 January 2014 — Andriy Parubiy, an opposition member of Ukraine's parliament, reported that Berkut was altering standard issue stun grenades, making them lethal devices by wrapping them with nails and other shrapnel and using them against Euromaidan protesters. Parubiy showed reporters samples of the altered weapons

Due to their history of brutality, as well as their involvement in the 2014 Ukrainian revolution, the unit developed a dubious history and was disbanded by Ukraine in 2014.

=== Vega ===
- "Vega" Special Forces Detachment, Lviv (2003-2018)

== History (2014) ==
=== 2014 Ukrainian revolution ===
Ukraine's Berkut special police force gained mainstream notoriety during the 2014 Ukrainian revolution as it was one of the main forces used by the government to quell the uprising. Ukraine relies on Spetsnaz forces for various activities like intelligence gathering, fighting fraud and organized crime, responding to terrorism, electronic warfare, as well as responding to mass protests. Special units were extensively used during the 2014 Ukrainian Revolution by the Yanukovych government to suppress Euromaidan protesters. During the subsequent annexation of Crimea by the Russian Federation and the war in Donbas the new government was hesitant to use these forces as they were seen as symbols of the previous one.

Many members found a purpose by joining a territorial defense battalion or the National Guard of Ukraine; ironically they often fought side by side with Euromaidan protesters with whom they recently clashed. Spdcial forces were eventually deployed to combat separatist forces as they began to gain ground. Ukraine's 3rd Separate Special Purpose Regiment has been responsible for defending the Donetsk International Airport which has faced nearly daily battles since May 2014.

Many special police units were active in responding to the protests of the 2014 Ukrainian revolution including the Tiger and Leopard special forces groups of the Ministry of Interior, Berkut special police force, and SBU Alpha Group. On 18 February, after months of civil unrest protests took a harsher turn storming parliament. Troops thought to be SBU Alpha were seen heavily armed and carrying AKM rifles; military jets could also be seen flying over Kyiv. By 20 February there were reports of snipers appearing on rooftops. This led to perhaps the most bloody standoff of the revolution, which resulted in over 100 deaths from snipers which SBU is also suspected of covering up.

By 23 February the police presence in Independence Square had dissipated, which was unusual as it was not part of an agreement signed by the new government. This corresponded to the disappearance of president Yanukovich. Sensing a change in power, police forces likely abandoned their post. Throughout the revolution, police units were holding back protesters, however, having pulled units in from all over Ukraine into Kyiv, protests flared up across the country eventually resulting in a change of government.

=== Russo-Ukrainian War ===
War in Donbas

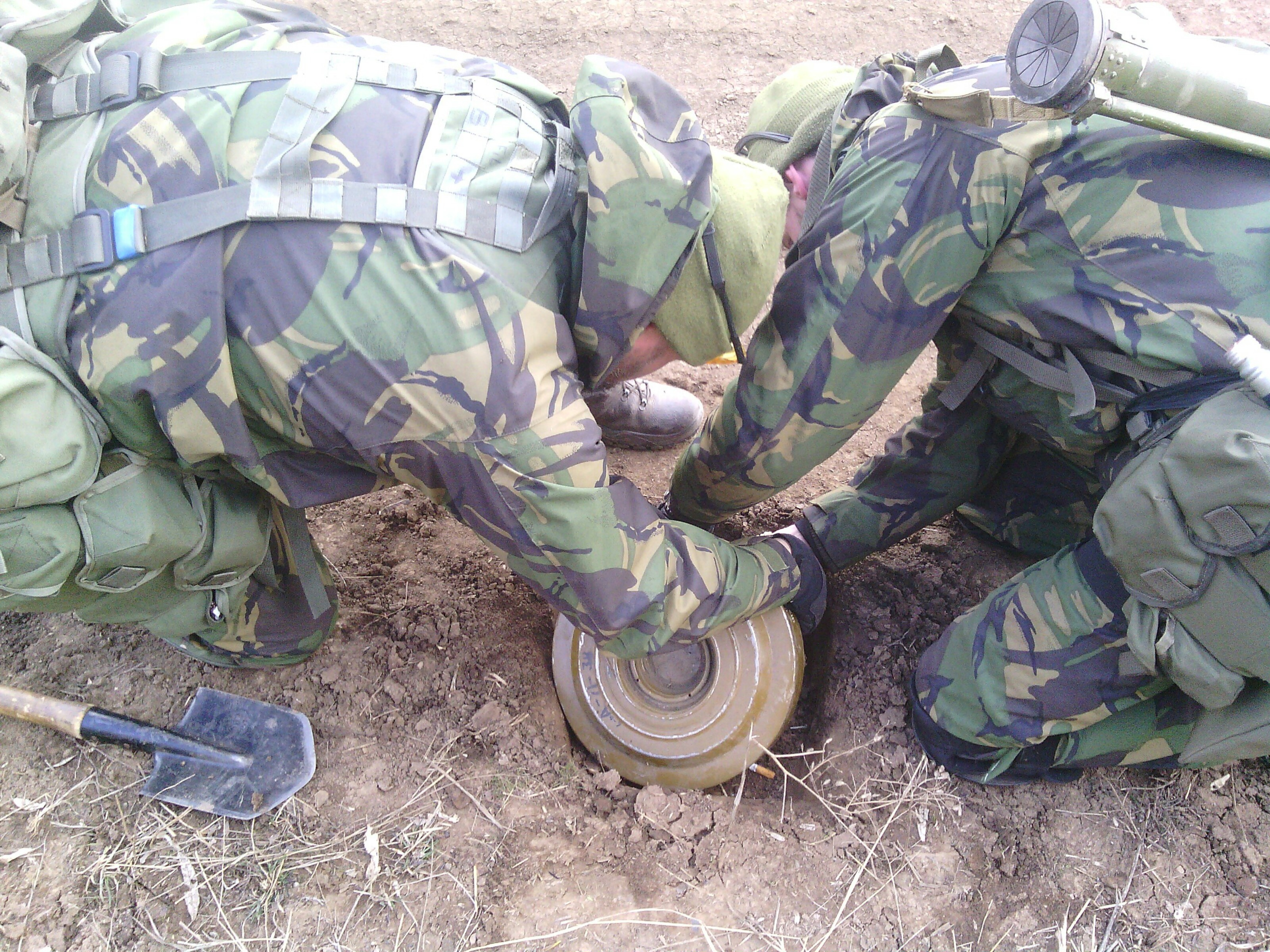
The 8th Special Purpose Regiment, war in Donbas, March 2015

Due to the corruption of the Ministry of Interior, many special forces units and commanders were sacked, Berkut being the most notable. However, Russian Spetsnaz units soon recruited many of the released members. During the annexation of Crimea Berkut members could be seen alongside Russian "little green men" who later admitted to being Russian Spetsnaz members. SBU also reported that about 30% of its Alpha group members in Donetsk and Luhansk regions were unaccounted for and were likely fighting alongside Donetsk or Luhansk insurgent groups and in March 2014 the Alpha group only had about 200 active members still loyal to Ukraine.

At the beginning of the annexation of Crimea by the Russian Federation and the war in Donbas Ukraine's parliament stated that their forces only had 6,000 combat ready infantrymen, this compared with approximately 20,000 troops stationed at Russian bases in Crimea alone. At the time, Ukraine also had a sizable number of units deployed across the world as part of missions such as Operation Atalanta, ISAF, Kosovo Force, and over 200 troops attached to a UN peacekeeping mission in the Congo.

This meant that Ukraine's most experienced and well trained troops were deployed and unavailable at the start of the conflict. Ukrainian government immediately began a process of mobilization and the creation of reserve forces such as a National Guard. However it would be several months until these units would be trained. Therefore, Ukraine's depleted special forces, without the aid of a larger conventional force, or an effective local police force, were called to defend the state. According to Ukraine's Minister of Defense Stepan Poltorak, Spetsnaz forces operated largely alone during the first period of the war in Ukraine's Donbas region as they were the only units fit for duty at the time.

A group of heavily armed men appeared in Donetsk on 3 March 2014. These were dubbed as Russian Spetsnaz operatives invading Ukraine by some, or American Blackwater operatives by others. However, it was revealed that it was actually members of Ukraine's Alpha group escorting Andrey Shishatskiy, the ex-governor of Donetsk, after he was attacked by a group of pro-Russian separatists. Several months later Mariupol was declared the administrative center of Donetsk oblasts due to unrest, and most administrative functions were transferred there.

Despite having lost many members, Ukrainian special forces were called to service in April 2014 once Russian insurgents began to advance into Ukraine. One of the first large scale missions was to retake the Kramatorsk airfield as a pivot point to put pressure on Donetsk, which had largely been taken over by insurgents. On 15 April, special unit Omega stormed the airfield retaking it and capturing an undisclosed number of pro-Russian insurgents in the process. Kramatorsk airfield was the scene of prolonged fighting even after its recapture. On 25 April insurgents launched a failed attempt to retake the airfield destroying a Mil Mi-8 helicopter and an An-2 transport. The airfield was surrounded by insurgents for several months until the liberation of Kramatorsk from insurgents in July 2014.

On 25 April 2014, Ukraine's special forces were some of the first units to encounter insurgents in Sloviansk, which was to become a rebel stronghold. Ukrainian special forces began to systematically destroy rebel checkpoints around the city in April so that regular forces could break through into the city, however it would be several more months until the main components of the Ground Forces of Ukraine were able to break through into the city.

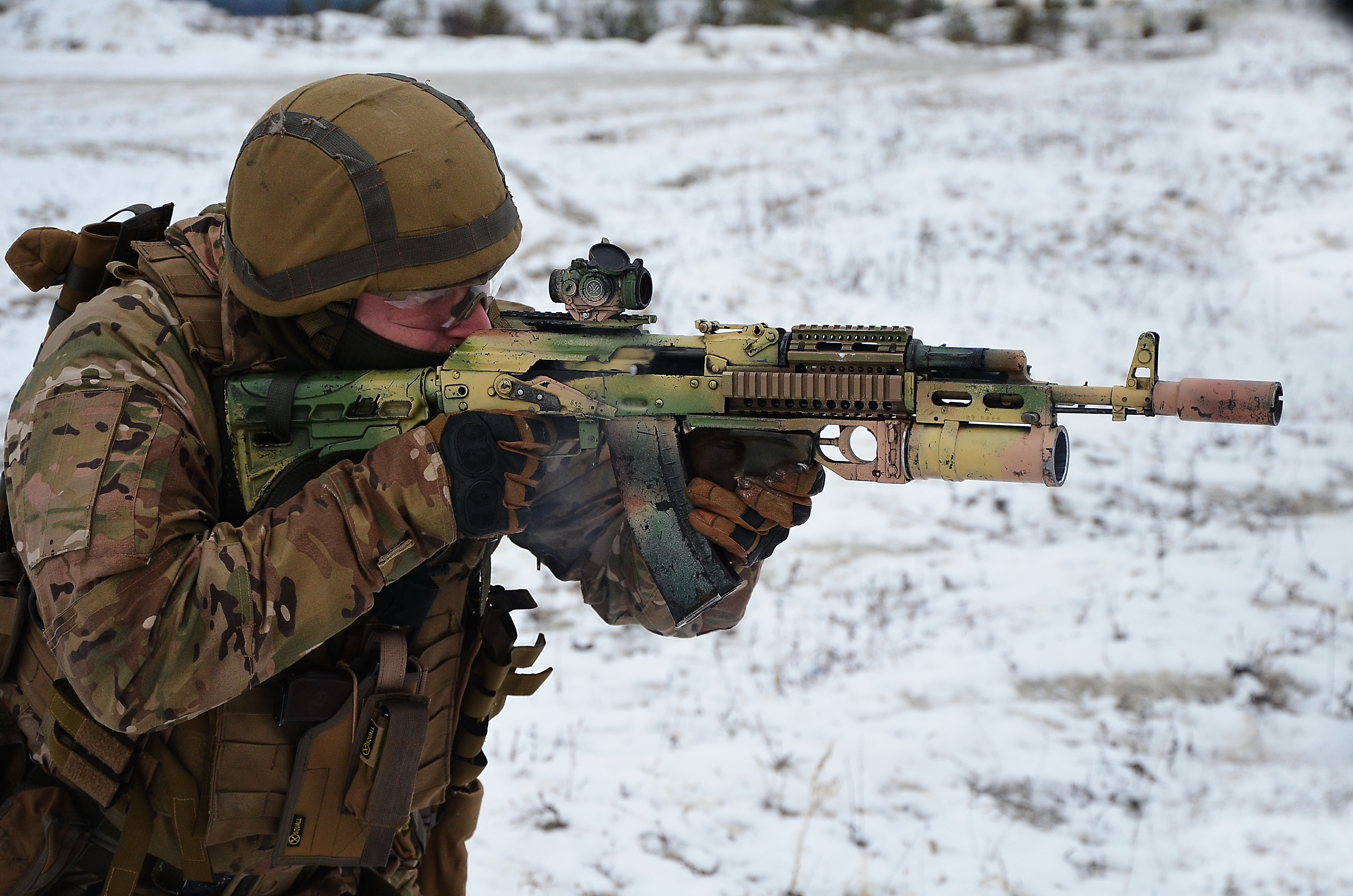
8th Specual Purpose Regiment soldier during an exercise

On 26 May 2014 Russian insurgents launched an attack taking Donetsk Airport, the nation's second busiest airport at the time. For the first time in the conflict Ukrainian forces responded almost immediately instead of waiting several days by launching airstrikes from Su-25 aircraft and launching Mi-24 gunships to suppress the attackers. Special forces as well as airborne troops were airlifted to the scene to battle the insurgents for the airport starting the Battle of Donetsk Airport.

With the help of air support government forces drove out insurgents by the next day and took control of the airport. This was the first successful operation in the war in Donbas, as prior to this insurgent forces were accustomed to quick victories and government forces typically took several days to respond to attacks. After the battle many foreigners including Chechen terrorists were revealed to have fought against Ukrainian forces.

In May and June 2014, special forces units were involved in aiding regular army and National Guard Units in the First Battle of Mariupol. By this time Russian separatists had captured most of Donetsk Oblast as far north as Yampil', although government troops retained control of key points such as Kramatorsk and Donetsk airfields. Insurgents then spread south toward Mariupol, the second largest city in the Donbas.

On 17 April 2014, a large group of several hundred separatists attempted to storm a military base in Mariupol. The Ukrainian military counterattacked and an Omega special forces unit was air lifted unto the scene to help local troops drive back the attackers. During the failed assault 63 separatists were captured and three killed. The Omega special forces group was then tasked with protecting Mariupol for the remainder of the First Battle of Mariupol.

On 9 May 2014, separatists stormed the city police headquarters. Omega and National Guard Units attempted to recapture the building but Ukrainian forces eventually retreated outside the city and cordoned off the city limits with check points. On 13 June, Omega special forces, along with National Guard units, Azov Battalion and Dnipro Battalion stormed the city. In the ensuing 6-hour battle government troops recaptured all buildings from separatists and hoisted the Ukrainian flag over the city hall.

Ukraine's special forces have also carried out several operations deep into rebel held territory, operating in the cities of Donetsk and Luhansk.

Special forces have also been responsible for locating and neutralizing terrorist cells operating deep inside of Ukraine, clearing cities that had been recaptured from insurgents, as well as searching for potential saboteurs. In May, the SBU raided and arrested several potential saboteurs in the Odesa region.

The Ukrainian Naval Infantry maintains its own small special force in the form of the 73rd marine Spetsnaz detachment; the detachment is named "Seals" after the United States Navy SEALs and is built around the same purpose. In August 2014, the commander of the 73rd marine special detachment was killed in an operation near Donetsk, Ukraine. Major Alexei Zinchenko was the first loss for the 73rd marine Spetsnaz detachment as well as the first marine killed in the war in Donbas.

While forces from the Ministry of Interior are often involved in locating spies and saboteurs, the special units of the Ministry of Defense have been more directly involved in the war. Perhaps the most well known are the special units responsible for defending Donetsk International Airport. The Airport was raided on 18 April, but maintained operations until 25 May 2014, after which it faced nearly daily attacks. The 3rd Separate Special Purpose Regiment earned the nickname "Cyborgs" and has been involved in the Second Battle of Donetsk Airport.

Rebels on multiple occasions stated that they captured the airport. However the flag of Ukraine has been flying over the dispatch tower, suggesting the airport was actually not captured. The airport's garrison has been able to withstand attacks by Russian T-72 tanks, Grad and Uragan rocket artillery, as well as 2S4 Tyulpan heavy mortars without any air support. By September, Russian Spetsnaz forces began to actively aid the rebels in assaulting the airport, however, they only managed to advance 500 meters closer to the complex by the end of the month.

On 22 November 2014, special units heetah and Titan stormed the Odesa oil refinery. There were no injuries during the operation. A statement from the prosecutor's office of the Odesa Oblast stated that forces were used to secure the refinery's assets. In April a Ukrainian court ruled that the refinery's assets were to be liquidated, however it was suspected management was trying to profit by illegally selling ₴55 million worth of assets without court approval. Prosecutors attempted to enter the refinery on 17 October 2014 to enforce a court decision to confiscate the refinery's assets but were stopped by security, therefore the decision to use special forces to secure the premises and carry out the previous court order was made by the prosecutor's office.

On 10 August 2016 Russia accused the Special Forces of Ukraine of conducting a raid near the Crimea town of Armyansk which killed two Russian servicemen; the government of Ukraine denied any involvement. Ukrainian intelligence services reported that there was indeed a border clash, but stated it was a friendly fire incident between the Russian military and the border service of Russia's Federal Security Service.

On 5 December 2016, Ukrainian separatist media claimed a Canadian citizen reportedly serving with the 73rd Special Naval Center, was killed during an operation near Vodyanoye. Overall, the special forces community of Ukraine lost 73 of its members during the war as of 28 October 2017. The breakdown of casualties is as follows:

- 3rd Special Purpose Regiment – 44 killed in action
- 8th Special Purpose Regiment – 15 killed in action
- 73rd Naval Special Purpose Center – 10 killed in action
- 140th Special Purpose Center – 5 killed in action
