= 140th Separate Special Purpose Regiment =

140th Separate Special Operations Regiment
- 140-й окремий центр сил спеціальних операцій
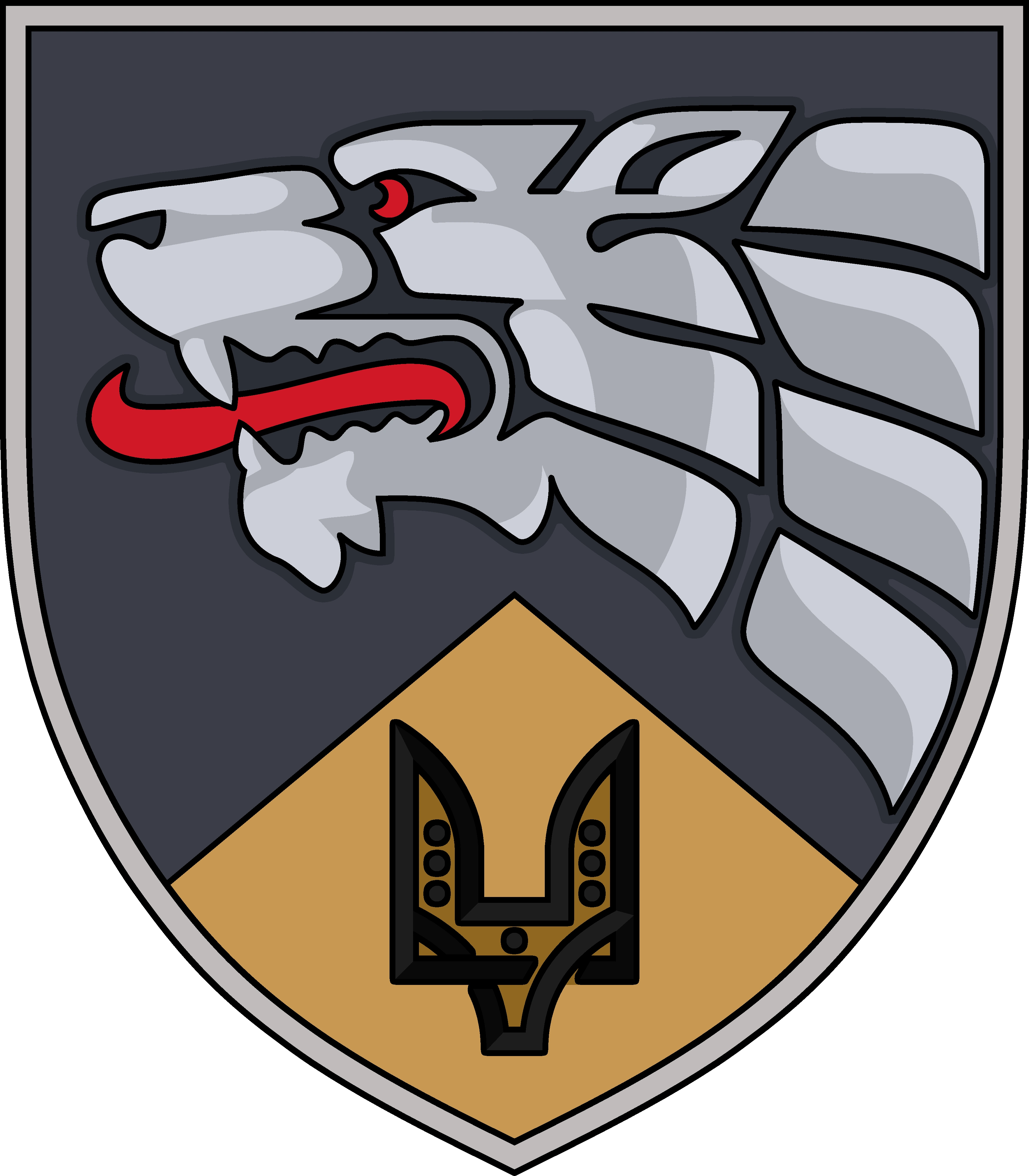
- Regiment Insignia
- Active: 2007–present
- Country: Ukraine
- Branch: Ukrainian Ground Forces (2007–2016); Ukrainian Special Operations Forces (2016–)
- Role: Special Operations
- Garrison/HQ: Khmelnytskyi
- Engagements: Anti-piracy operations off the Somalian coast Russo-Ukrainian War: War in Donbas; Russian invasion of Ukraine
- Decorations: Courage and Bravery

140th Separate Special Operations Regiment is a NATO-certified regiment of the Ukrainian SOF. It is one of the most covert and secretive units within the Ukrainian SOF. It was established in 2007 and operates as an all-officer regiment participating in covert operations. In 2009, it became a part of the NATO Response Force.

== History ==
=== Establishment ===
The 140th Regiment was established in 2007 on the basis of the 8th Special Purpose Regiment in Khmelnytskyi, consisting of 70 personnel in the beginning with the following tasks:

- Ambushes
- Raiding from across the front lines
- Sabotage
- Coordination of Partisans
- Establishment of a military occupation government

Initially it was to be used in operations against piracy off the coast of Somalia.

=== War in Donbas ===
The regiment took part in multiple combat operations during the War in Donbas.

On July 24, 2014, near Pervomaysk, the regiment discovered a large separatist force consisting of two VAZ-2106s, two PAZ-3205s, a GAZelle minibus and a jeep carrying about 70-80 personnel. The regiment's group commander decided to strike and the group opened fire inflicting heavy losses on the separatists. In ten minutes all the vehicles were destroyed and most of the separatists were killed. While returning the regiment's group was ambushed by separatists killing four personnel of the regiment (Andriy Chaban, Volodymyr Cherkasov, Vasyl Koberniuk and Taras Yakymchuk) The Armoured Personnel Carrier of the regiment was struck by mortar severely damaging it meanwhile all the four personnel in KAMAZ were killed. Then Omega group came for reinforcement along with medics but the four wounded couldn't be saved. A helicopter was dispatched and the remaining two wounded were rescued. On August 7, 2014, the regiment undertook a combat rescue mission to evacuate the crew of a downed Mi-8 medical helicopter near Savur-Mohyla, all five personnel of the helicopter including three wounded were safely evacuated.

Dan Kolisnyk, a company commander of the regiment, was killed in action on October 26, 2014, while attempting an assault to breach the encirclement of the 32nd checkpoint by separatists.

The unit became a part of the Special Operations Forces with its establishment in January 2016.

=== NATO designation ===
In July 2017, personnel of the regiment took part in the Flaming Sword 2017 exercise in Lithuania along with a thousand soldiers from nine countries.

In 2019, the regiment underwent training to perform as one of the NATO Response Force units.

In June 2019, it was certified as a SOF unit by NATO with the ability to be deployed with the NATO Response Force, becoming the first such non-NATO unit. The certification took place in Lithuania.

On December 6, 2021, on the occasion of the 30th anniversary of the formation of the Armed Forces of Ukraine, twelve Humvees were transferred to the 140th Regiment from the United States.

=== Full scale Russian Invasion ===
Units of the center took part in the Northern Ukraine campaign including the defense/recapture of Bucha, Hostomel, and Borodyanka, amongst other settlements.

On 29 June 2022 the regiment was awarded the honour "For Courage and Bravery".

The regiment took part in the 2022 Kharkiv counteroffensive, and participated in the liberation of Izyum and the defense of Chuhuiv.

The regiment saw combat in Zaporizhzhia Oblast during the 2023 Ukrainian counteroffensive, during which one of its group commanders, Eduard Sharan, was killed in action on November 27, 2023.

A soldier of the regiment, Dmyterko Anton was killed in combat on 12 September 2024.

== Commanders ==
- Dan Kolisnyk † (2007–2014)
- Eduard Sharan † (2014–2023)
- Unknown (2023-)

== Operational secrecy ==
It is one of the most covert units among the Ukrainian SOF and most of its operations and engagements are not publicly disclosed. Moreover, the names of its personnel cannot be publicly disclosed. The only names disclosed are only of those that are killed in action and henceforth, most of the engagements of the regiment in public knowledge are those with casualties of regiment's personnel.

== Sources and references ==
- Найсекретніші спецпризначенці: 140 центр сил спеціальних операцій.
- 140-й центр спеціального призначення отримав бойовий прапор.
- 140-му окремому центру спеціального призначення ССпО ЗС України — три роки.
- Михаил Жирохов (2017-07-31). "Офицерский спецназ: 140-й центр сил специальных операций". begemot.media (in Ukrainian). Begemot Media. Archived from the original on 2017-07-31.
- 140 центр сил спеціальних операцій
- "З'явилося видовищне відео тренування українських ССО у Карпатах". mil.in.ua. 2018-10-01. Archived from the original on 2 October 2018.
- uk:140-й окремий центр сил спеціальних операцій (Україна)
