= Viktor Khorenko =

Ukrainian military personnel

- Хоренко Віктор Олександрович
- Born: Viktor Oleksandrovych Khorenko
- Military career
- Allegiance: Ukraine
- Branch: Special Operations Forces
- Rank: Major general

Viktor Oleksandrovych Khorenko (Ukrainian: Хоренко Віктор Олександрович) is a Major General of the Armed Forces of Ukraine. He commanded Ukraine's Special Operations Forces during the Russian-Ukrainian War from 25 July 2022 until his dismissal on 3 November 2023.

== Biography ==
Before being appointed to the position of commander of the SSO of the Armed Forces of Ukraine, he commanded the special reserve of the Main Intelligence Directorate of the Military Intelligence.

On July 25, 2022, by the decree of President Volodymyr Zelenskyy, he was appointed commander of the Special Operations Forces of the Armed Forces of Ukraine. He replaced Hryhorii Halahan as the commander of the SOF.

In September 2023 President Zelenskyy conferred the rank of major general to Khorenko.

On November 3, 2023, by the decree of President Zelenskyy Khorenko was dismissed as commander of the SSO. The same day Zelenskyy stated that Khorenko would continue to carry out special tasks as part of the Main Intelligence Directorate of the Ministry of Defence. Khorenko claimed that he had learned of his dismissal through the press, according to Khorenko Commander-in-Chief of the Armed Forces of Ukraine Valerii Zaluzhnyi should have made the appropriate submission, but Zaluzhnyi had told Khorenko that he had not done so. The following day Deputy Head of the Office of the President of Ukraine Roman Mashovets and Defence Minister Rustem Umierov stated that Khorenko was dismissed at the request of Umierov and that this was the proper legal mechanism for his dismissal.
