= Roman Mashovets =

Ukrainian politician (born 1976)

- Роман Машовець
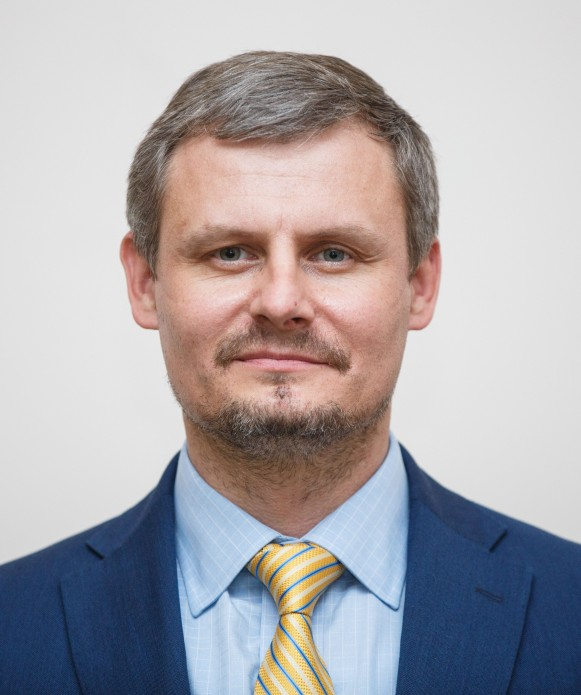
- Official portrait, 2021

Deputy Head of the Office of the President of Ukraine
- In office April 22, 2020 – December 30, 2024
- President: Volodymyr Zelenskyy

Member of the National Council on Anti-Corruption Policy
- Incumbent
- Assumed office June 1, 2020

Personal details
- Born: 1976 (age 49–50)
- Education: Ivan Bohun Military High School
- Profession: combat diver

Military service
- Branch/service: Ukrainian military intelligence and Naval special forces
- Battles/wars: Peacekeeping mission in Sierra Leone; Ukrainian contingent in Iraq; Russo-Ukrainian War; War in Donbas

Roman Vasyliovych Mashovets (Ukrainian: Роман Васильович Машовець; born 1976) is a Ukrainian politician and veteran of military intelligence and special forces. He was a Deputy Head of the Office of the President of Ukraine from 22 April 2020 to 30 December 2024.

== Biography ==
He graduated from the Military Diplomatic Academy. He is a veteran of military intelligence and special forces.

Roman Mashovets is a military officer: from the Ivan Bohun Military High School in 1993 to the Foreign Intelligence Department of the Chief Directorate of Intelligence of the Ministry of Defence of Ukraine in 2008.

After graduating from the military school, he began serving in the naval special forces – combat divers.

He served in the special purpose unit of the Chief Directorate of Intelligence of the Ministry of Defence of Ukraine, in the peacekeeping mission in Sierra Leone, as well as in the Ukrainian contingent in Iraq.

Since July 2014, he has been engaged in the organization of military-technical assistance for the Ukrainian Army.

Roman Mashovets stood at the origins of the creation of the Special Operations Forces of the Armed Forces of Ukraine.

He conducted 25 trips to the war zone in the east of Ukraine.

== Political career ==
Roman Mashovets founded the charitable public organization "National Values of Ukraine", which is engaged in tracking modern trends in the national security and defense sector, researching the real state of the Ukrainian army, preparing analytical reports that are sent to the state structures of Ukraine and the United States, and the problematic issues of reintegration of temporarily occupied territories.

On April 22, 2020, he was appointed Deputy Head of the Office of the President of Ukraine. He was dismissed from this position on 30 December 2024.

He is a member of the National Council on Anti-Corruption Policy (since June 1, 2020).
