= Scorpion Regiment (Ukraine) =

Special Purpose Scorpion Regiment
- Скорпіон Полк (Ukrainian)
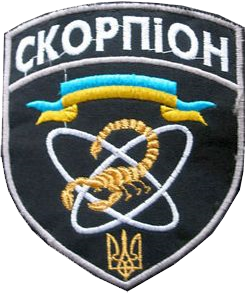
- Regimental Insignia
- Founded: 1998
- Country: Ukraine
- Branch: National Guard of Ukraine
- Type: Regiment
- Role: Nuclear Protection
- Size: Classified
- Garrison/HQ: Kyiv
- Nickname(s): Battle Scorpions
- Motto(s): "Where there's will, there's way!"

The Scorpion Separate Special Purpose Regiment is a Special Operations Force unit of the National Guard of Ukraine tasked with protection of strategic objectives notably the nuclear power plants, military industrial complex, chemical and nuclear research institutions amongst others. It was established in 1998 as a part of the Internal Troops of Ukraine and is headquartered in Kyiv. It is a highly secretive unit and its operations are highly classified.

== History ==
The unit was established in 1998 in order to overcome the threat of international terrorism and domestic terrorism, the regiment was established tasked with the protection and defense of high-risk objects as Ukraine has developed nuclear energy, so the nuclear power plants can theoretically become the target of a terrorist attack. Its main task is to ensure technological security. "Scorpion" is a counterterrorism unit and hence conducts anti-terrorist measures in conditions of immediate threat but in some cases the personnel can take up the duty of protection and defense. Following are the major tasks of the regiment:

- Counterterrorism operations on;
  - Nuclear power plants
  - Nuclear research facilities
  - Nuclear fuel and radioactive material storage sites
- Escort and transport of radioactive material
- Protection and Defense of the Chernobyl Nuclear Power Plant
- Assistance to Armed Forces and Paramilitaries of Ukraine in defense of vital strategic objectives

Due to the operational nature of the regiment, its operations are always kept secret.

== Sites guarded by the regiment ==
The sites guarded by the Scorpion regiment are:

- 4 Nuclear Power Plants
- Chernobyl Nuclear Power Plant
- 3 Nuclear Research Reactor Stations
- 9 Military–industrial complex sites
- Chemical industry research institutes
- Special Cargo including Radioactive materials
