= Special Operations Forces (Ukraine) =

Elite military formation

- Сили спеціальних операцій, ССО ЗСУ; Syly Spetsialnykh Operatsiy, SSO ZSU
- Emblem of the Special Operations Forces
- Founded: 2016
- Country: Ukraine
- Type: Special forces
- Role: Special operations Counter-terrorism; Direct action Special reconnaissance Intelligence gathering Sabotage; Psychological warfare
- Size: 1,000–2,000 (2022)
- Part of: Armed Forces of Ukraine
- Garrison/HQ: Kyiv
- Motto: I'm coming for you!
- Color of beret: Steel Grey
- March: "Song of the Brave"
- Mascot: Werewolf
- Anniversaries: 27 May, Day of the SSO
- Engagements: Russo-Ukrainian War; War in Donbas; Russian invasion of Ukraine; Sudanese civil war; Syrian civil war
- Website: sof.mil.gov.ua

Commanders
- Current commander: Brig. Gen. Oleksandr Trepak

Insignia
- Flag

- Shoulder sleeve insignia

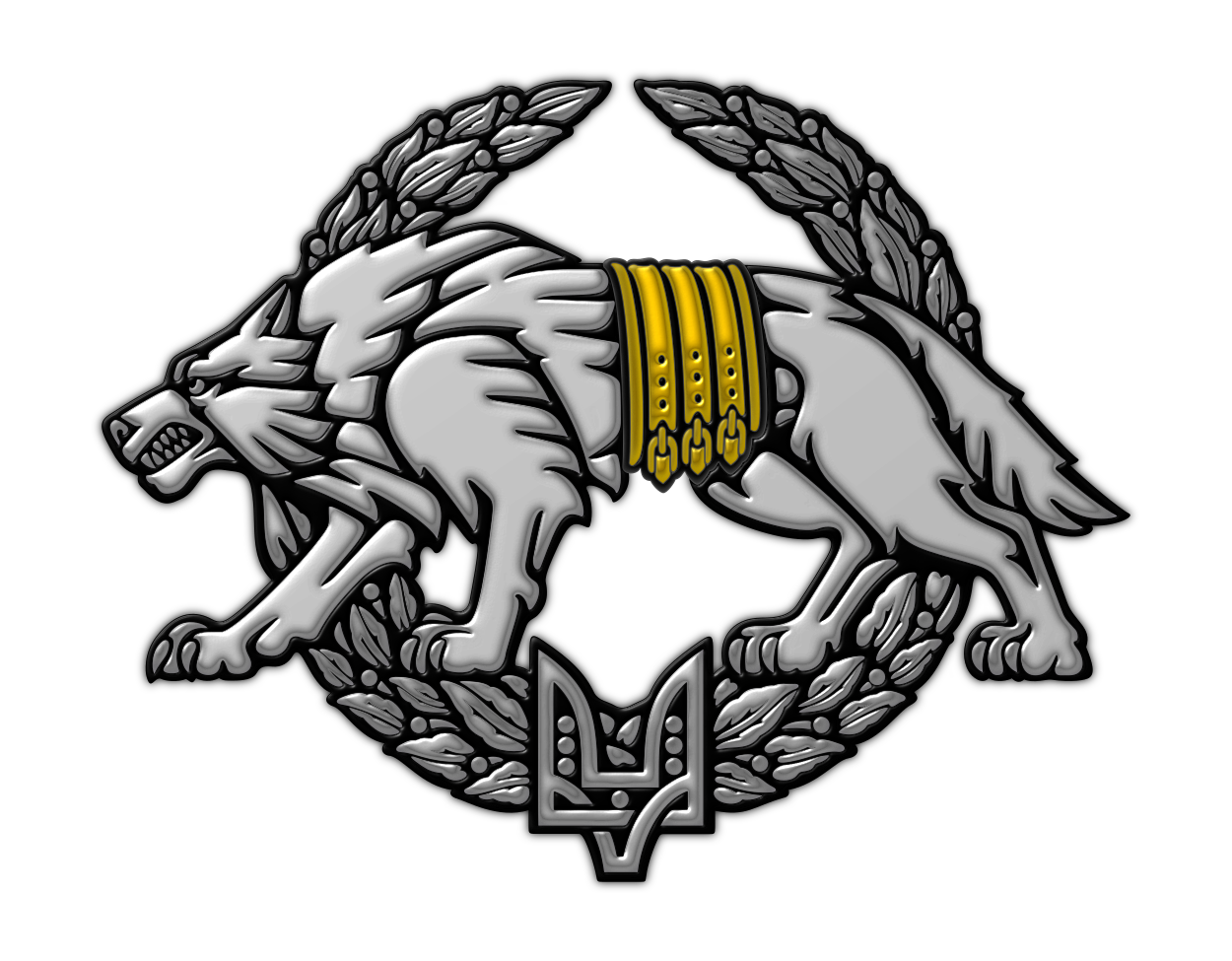
- Cap badge

The Special Operations Forces of the Armed Forces of Ukraine (Ukrainian: Сили спеціальних операцій Збройних сил України,, romanized: Syly spetsialnykh operatsii Zbroinykh syl Ukrainy, abbreviated ССО, SSO) are the special forces of Ukraine and one of the eight branches of the Armed Forces of Ukraine, with headquarters in Kyiv.

The SSO has the roles including various special forces-related duties such as direct action, special reconnaissance, intelligence gathering, sabotage and psychological warfare. They are not the only special forces units in Ukraine. The SSO was created in 2016, after various reforms of the Ukrainian Armed Forces due to failures in the war in Donbas. The Ukrainian special forces groups were trained on the model of NATO reaction forces. Reorganizing by concentrating the special forces command into a single unified branch. Previously, military Spetsnaz were under the command of the Chief Directorate of Intelligence (HUR), Ukraine's military intelligence service.

== History ==
The branch was formed based on military units of the Ukrainian Chief Directorate of Intelligence (HUR), the military intelligence service, which were originally formed of the Soviet GRU Spetsnaz, based in Ukraine (then Ukrainian SSR). They were special forces units under the command of the Soviet military intelligence service GRU; the Ukrainians adopted a similar model, placing their top special forces unit under the HUR.

In 2014, Special Forces Command numbered over 4,000 Spetsnaz operatives, all of whom are professional soldiers.

=== Russo-Ukrainian War ===
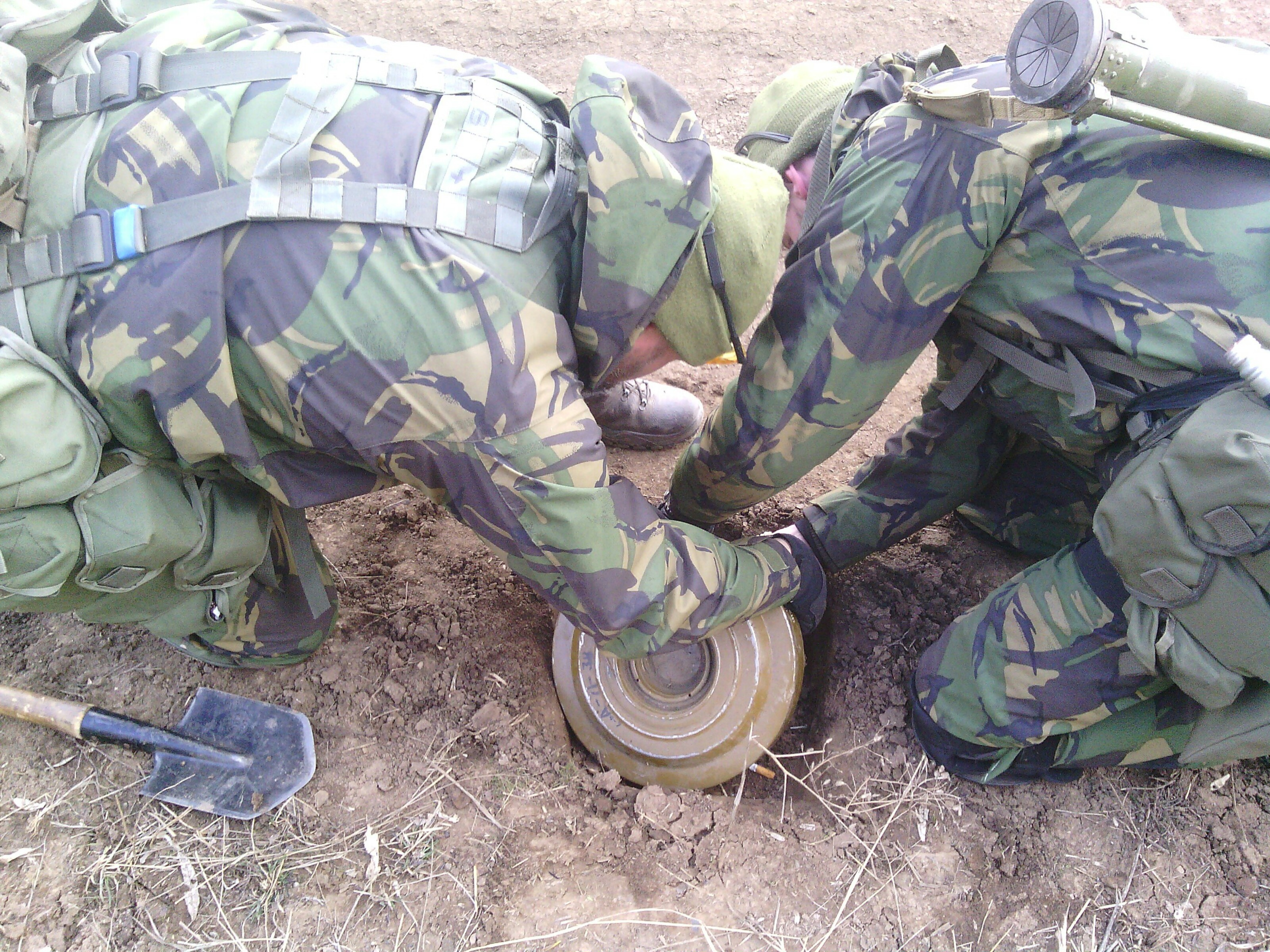
Troops of the 8th Spetsnaz Regiment in Donbas, March 2015

War in Donbas

After Russia's illegal annexation of Crimea and the outbreak of the war in Donbas, Ukraine's parliament stated that their forces only had 6,000 combat-ready infantrymen, compared with approximately 20,000 troops stationed at Russian bases in Crimea alone. At the time, Ukraine also had a sizable number of units deployed across the world as part of missions such as Operation Atalanta, ISAF, Kosovo Force, and over 200 troops attached to a UN peacekeeping mission in the Congo.

This meant that Ukraine's most experienced and well trained troops were deployed and unavailable at the start of the conflict. The Ukrainian government immediately began a process of mobilization and the creation of reserve forces such as the National Guard of Ukraine; however, it would be several months until these units would be trained. Therefore, Ukraine's depleted Spetsnaz forces, without the aid of a larger conventional force or an effective local police force, were called to defend the state. According to Ukraine's Minister of Defense Stepan Poltorak, Spetsnaz forces operated largely alone during the first period of the war in Ukraine's Donbas region as they were the only units fit for duty at the time.

A group of heavily armed men appeared in Donetsk on 3 March 2014. These were mistakenly identified at first as Russian Spetsnaz operatives invading Ukraine by some, or American Blackwater mercenaries by others. However, it was revealed that it was actually members of Ukraine's Alpha Group escorting Andrey Shishatskiy, the ex-governor of Donetsk, after he was attacked by a group of pro-Russian separatists or Russian Spetsnaz. Several months later Mariupol was declared the administrative center of Donetsk Oblast due to unrest, and most administrative functions were transferred there.

Despite having lost many members, Ukrainian Spetsnaz was called to service in April 2014 once Russian insurgents began to advance into Ukraine. One of the first large-scale missions was to retake the Kramatorsk airfield as a pivot point to put pressure on Donetsk, which had largely been taken over by insurgents. On 15 April, Spetsnaz unit Omega stormed the airfield retaking it and capturing an undisclosed number of pro-Russian insurgents in the process. Kramatorsk airfield was the scene of prolonged fighting even after its recapture. On 25 April insurgents launched a failed attempt to retake the airfield destroying a Mil Mi-8 helicopter and an An-2 transport. The airfield was surrounded by insurgents for several months until the liberation of Kramatorsk from insurgents in July 2014.

On April 25, 2014, Ukraine's Spetsnaz units were some of the first units to encounter insurgents in Sloviansk, which was to become a rebel stronghold. Ukrainian Spetsnaz units began to systematically destroy rebel checkpoints around the city in April so that regular forces could break through into the city; however, it would be several more months until the main components of the Ground Forces of Ukraine were able to break through into the city.

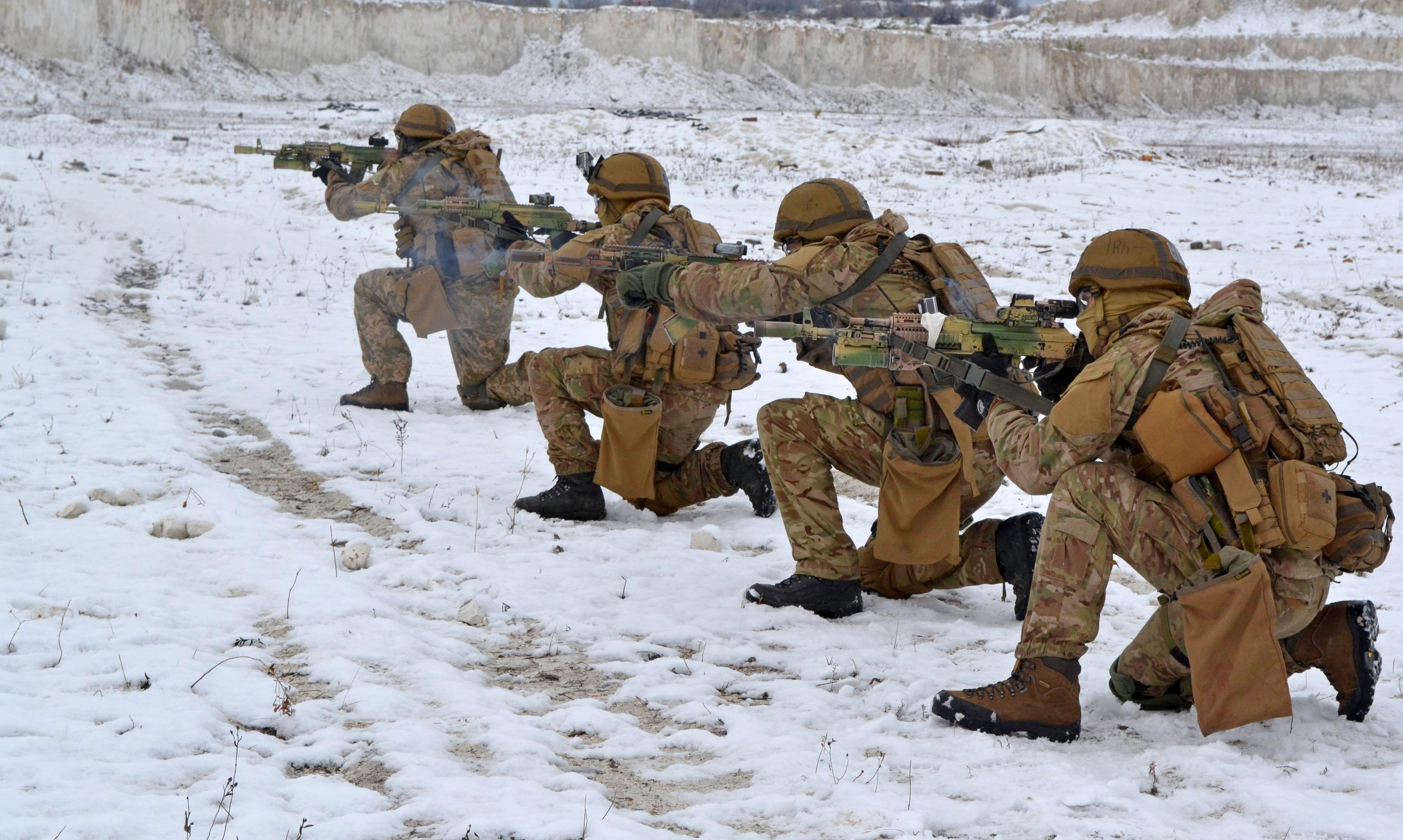
8th Spetsnaz Regiment soldiers during an exercise

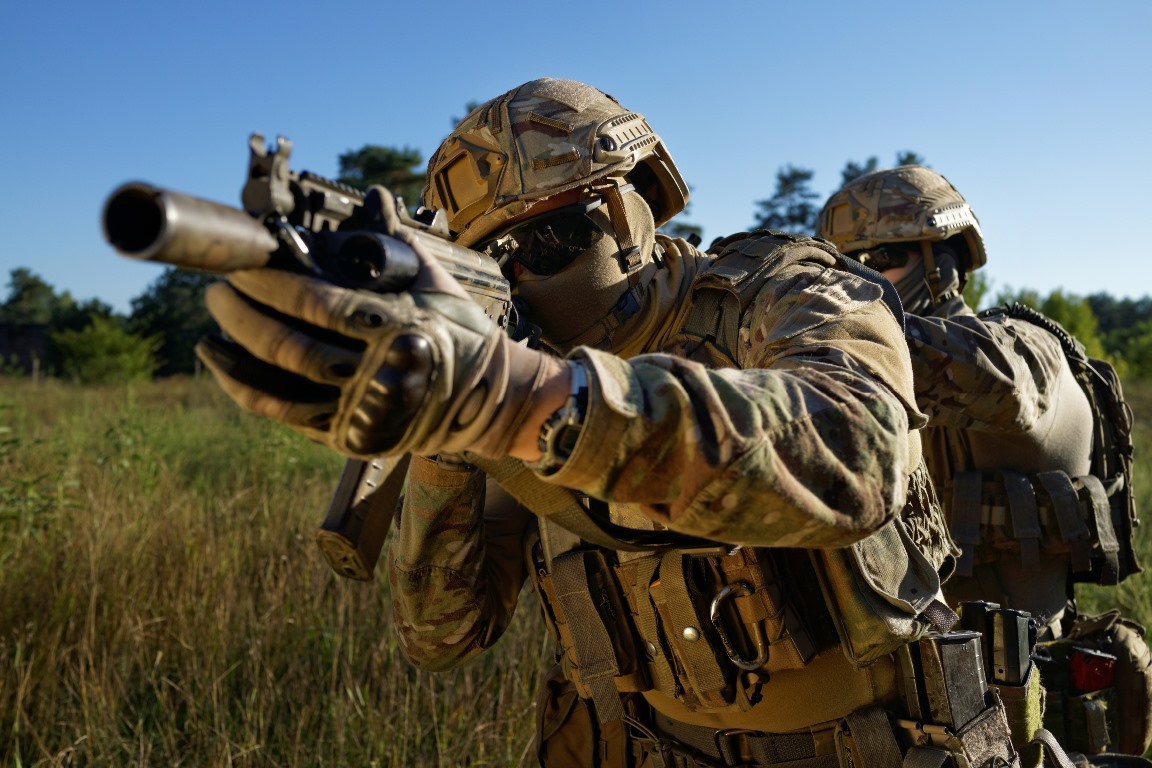
SSO operators with AKS74us

On 26 May 2014 Russian insurgents launched an attack taking Donetsk Airport, the nation's second-busiest airport at the time. For the first time in the conflict, Ukrainian forces responded almost immediately by launching airstrikes from Su-25 aircraft and launching Mi-24 gunships to suppress the attackers. Spetsnaz forces as well as airborne troops were airlifted to the scene to battle the insurgents for the airport, starting the First Battle of Donetsk Airport. With the help of air support government forces drove out insurgents by the next day and took control of the airport. This was the first successful operation in the war in Donbas, as prior to this insurgent forces were accustomed to quick victories and government forces typically took several days to respond to attacks.

In May and June 2014, Special Forces units were involved in aiding regular army and National Guard units in the First Battle of Mariupol. By this time, Russian separatists had captured most of Donetsk Oblast as far north as Yampil', although government troops retained control of key points such as Kramatorsk and Donetsk airfields. Insurgents then spread south toward Mariupol, the second-largest city in the Donbas. On April 17, 2014, a large group of several hundred separatists attempted to storm a military base in Mariupol.

The Ukrainian military counterattacked, and an Omega special forces unit was airlifted unto the scene to help local troops drive back the attackers. During the failed assault, 63 separatists were captured and three killed. The Omega special forces group was then tasked with protecting Mariupol for the remainder of the First Battle of Mariupol.

On 9 May, separatists stormed the city police headquarters. Omega and National Guard units attempted to recapture the building, but Ukrainian forces eventually retreated outside the city and cordoned off the city limits with check points. On 13 June, Omega special forces – along with National Guard units, Azov Battalion and Dnipro Battalion – stormed the city. In the ensuing six-hour battle, government troops recaptured all buildings from separatists and hoisted the Ukrainian flag over the city hall.

Ukraine's special forces have also carried out several operations deep into rebel-held territory, operating in the cities of Donetsk and Luhansk.

Spetsnaz forces have also been responsible for locating and neutralizing terrorist cells operating deep inside of Ukraine, clearing cities that had been recaptured from insurgents, as well as searching for potential saboteurs. In May, the SBU raided and arrested several potential saboteurs in Odesa Oblast.

The Ukrainian Naval Infantry maintains its own small Spetsnaz force in the form of the 73rd marine Spetsnaz detachment. The detachment is named "Seals" after the United States Navy SEALs and is tasked around the same purpose. In August 2014 the commander of the 73rd marine Spetsnaz detachment was killed in an operation near Donetsk, Ukraine. Major Alexei Zinchenko was the first loss for the 73rd marine Spetsnaz detachment as well as the first marine killed in the war in Donbas.

While forces from the Ministry of Interior are often involved in locating spies and saboteurs, the Spetsnaz units of the Ministry of Defense have been more directly involved in the war. Perhaps the most well known are the Spetsnaz units responsible for defending Donetsk International Airport. The Airport was raided on April 18, but maintained operations until May 25, 2014, after which it faced nearly daily attacks. Ukrainian forces have earned the nickname "Cyborgs". Rebels have on multiple occasions stated that they have captured the airport; however, the flag of Ukraine has been flying over the dispatch tower, suggesting the airport was actually not captured. The airport's garrison has been able to withstand attacks by Russian T-72 tanks, Grad and Uragan rocket artillery, and 2S4 Tyulpan heavy mortars without any air support. By September, Russian Spetsnaz forces began to actively aid the rebels in assaulting the airport; however, they only managed to advance 500 meters closer to the complex by the end of the month.

On 22 November 2014 Spetsnaz groups Cheetah and Titan stormed the Odesa oil refinery. There were no injuries during the operation. A statement from the prosecutor's office of Odesa Oblast stated that Spetsnaz forces were used to secure the refinery's assets. In April, a Ukrainian court ruled that the refinery's assets were to be liquidated; however, it was suspected that management was trying to profit by illegally selling ₴55 million worth of assets without court approval. Prosecutors attempted to enter the refinery on 17 October 2014 to enforce a court decision to confiscate the refinery's assets but were stopped by security; therefore, the prosecutor's office made the decision to use Spetsnaz forces to secure the premises and carry out the previous court order.

On 10 August 2016, Russia accused the Special Forces of Ukraine of conducting a raid near the Crimea town of Armyansk which killed 2 Russian servicemen; the government of Ukraine denied any involvement. Ukrainian intelligence services reported that there was indeed a border clash, but stated it was a friendly fire incident between the Russian military and the border service of Russia's Federal Security Service.

Previously the 3rd and 8th Special Forces Regiments existed at the locations where the SOF Centres East and West now are.

In November 2023, UAR-15 assault rifles were being adopted into SOF service.

=== Independent formation ===
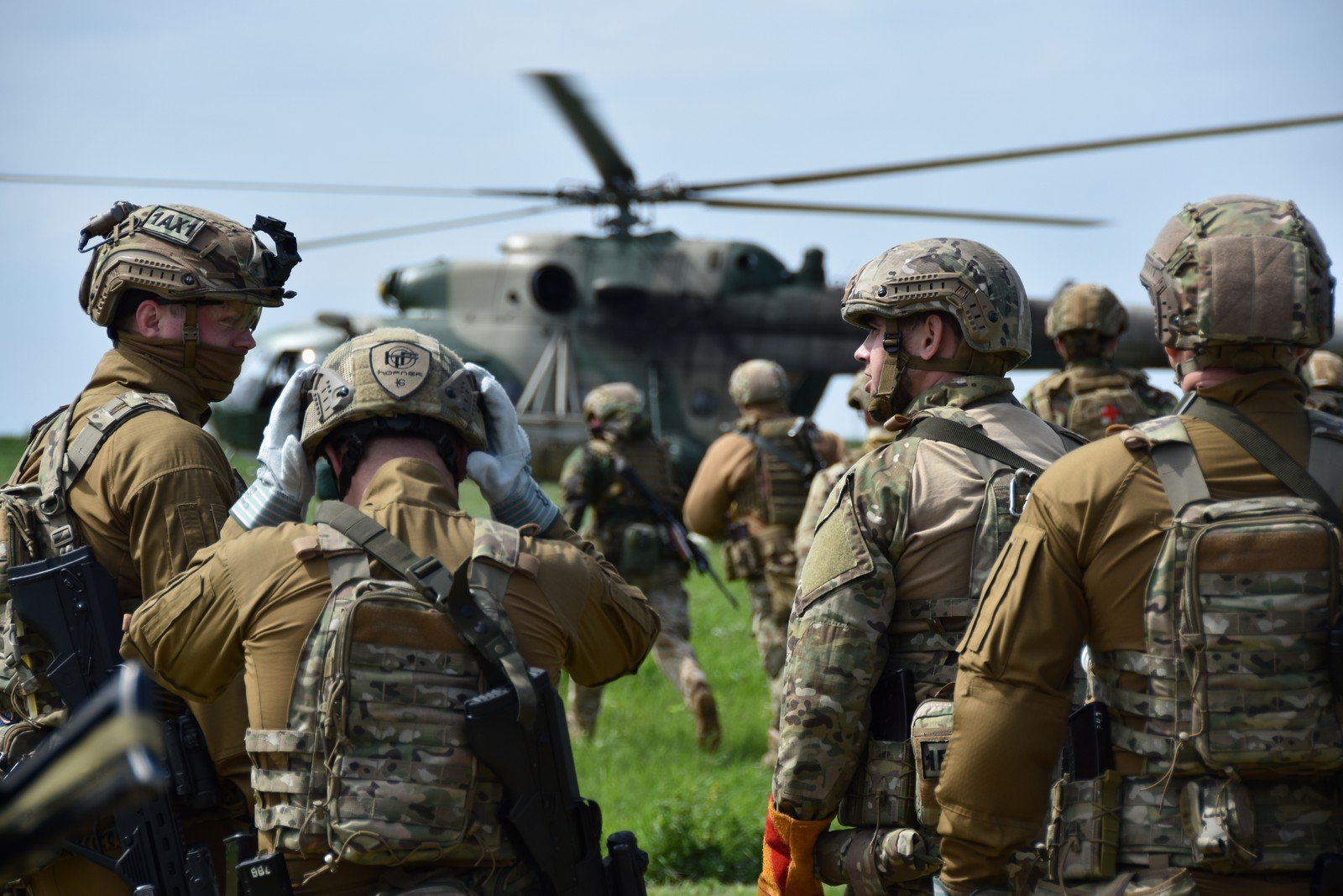
SSO operators during exercises with the 35th Squadron

On 5 January 2016, the special forces of Ukraine were placed under a single independent military branch, the Special Operations Forces. The catchphrase of Svyatoslav the Brave, "I Come at You!" (Ukrainian: Іду на ви!), was officially adopted as the organization's motto.

In June 2019, the 140th Special Operations Centre was certified as a special operations unit that can be involved in the NATO Response Force, the first from a non-NATO-member state.

As of 1 January 2022, the number of the Special Operations Forces had increased by 1,000.

Following the Russian invasion of Ukraine, a Special Forces wing made of foreign fighters was initiated by the Ukrainian Defense Ministry's intelligence directorate (GUR). This regiment is separate from the regular international legion but recruits from the force.

==== Operation in Sudan ====
On 19 September 2023, CNN reported that it was "likely" that Ukrainian Special Operations Forces were behind a series of drone strikes and a ground operation which was directed against the Wagner-backed RSF near Khartoum on 8 September. Kyrylo Budanov, chief of the Main Directorate of Intelligence, stated in an interview on 22 September that he could neither deny nor confirm the involvement of Ukraine in the conflict in Sudan, but said that Ukraine would punish Russian war criminals anywhere in the world.

On 6 November, the Kyiv Post released drone footage of what it claimed was Ukrainian special forces attacking Wagner mercenaries in an unidentified urban area in Sudan with an explosive projectile, which was believed to have been taken about two weeks before its publication. On 30 January 2024, the Kyiv Post reported that Ukrainian special forces had launched three drone strikes targeting the Wagner Group and other Russian forces in Sudan as well as their local partners in the preceding weeks. The Kyiv Post released a report on 5 February 2024 with video showing the aftermath of an attack by Ukrainian special forces on a Wagner Group unit that had suffered several deaths and the capture of at least one member seen being interrogated on camera.

==== Operations in Syria ====
In April 2023, The Washington Post reported on a leaked U.S. intelligence document (one of many leaked by Airman Jack Teixeira) which suggested that the Intelligence Directorate of the Ministry of Defense of Ukraine (HUR) was planning on attacking Russian military and Wagner mercenaries in Ukraine, but the idea was scrapped by President Zelenskyy. The plan was to "start small" by implementing unmanned aerial vehicle (UAV) strikes on Russian units. It was also suggested that Ukrainian special forces would covertly ally themselves with the Kurdish Syrian Democratic Forces (SDF) and provide UAV and aerial defense training for their People's Defense Units (YPG). Both Ukrainian and Kurdish military representatives denied these claims. The document indicated that low level fighting in the Syrian battlefield could give Ukraine deniability options and blame small scale attacks on various non-state actors. The leak further suggests that Turkey may have been aware of Ukraine's alleged plans and approved of it, in the hopes of baiting Moscow to attack the SDF, which is considered an enemy of Turkey.

In June 2024 The Kyiv Post reported on a video obtained from the HUR dated March 2024 describing Ukrainian special forces designated the "Khimik" group teaming up with Syrian rebels to assault Russian mercenaries in the Golan Heights area. The article describes the Ukrainian and Syrian forces specifically targeting "checkpoints, strongholds, foot patrols, military vehicle columns", using rocket-propelled grenades, "Tarab" mortars, and radio controlled (IED) equipped explosive suicide vehicles. The report suggests that Ukraine is targeting Russian units in part due to Russian efforts to recruit Syrian mercenaries via the Russian Reconciliation Center for Syria at the Khmeimim Air Base to fight for Russia in Ukraine. As of May 2024, there were fourteen Russian observation posts and three bases along the Israel-controlled Golan Heights area, along with Syrian rebel groups, and Iranian-backed groups which Israel had been targeting. At the time, Russia had been using these observation posts to gather intelligence on Israeli weapons used on Iranian forces, which are similar in design to the weapons the West provides Ukraine. This made the area an excellent staging ground for Ukrainian clandestine attacks on Russian positions.

In July The Kyiv Post released another report with a video displaying the "Khimik" group using drones to strike Russian military hardware in the Kuweires air base near Aleppo. The base was used by the Russians for air assaults, testing UAVs, and training and transferring Russian mercenaries.

The "Khimik" group again attacked Kuweires Airbase on September 15, 2024, this time specifically targeting the base's UAV testing hardware.

On November 27, 2024, the Syrian National Army launched Operation Dawn of Freedom targeting the Aleppo during the 2024 Syrian opposition offensives. Embedded within the invading force was the Turkistan Islamic Party in Syria (TIP), which had been trained by the "Khimik" group. It has been alleged that the "Khimik" group participated in the attack on Aleppo alongside the TIP.

Ukraine also sent 20 drone operators and 150 drones to aid Hay'at Tahrir al-Sham (HTS) at their stronghold in Idlib in its efforts to topple the Assad regime, and undermine Russian presence in the region.

=== Casualties ===
Overall, the special forces community of Ukraine lost 73 of its members during the war as of 28 October 2017. The breakdown of casualties is as follows:

- 3rd Special Purpose Regiment – 44 killed in action
- 8th Special Purpose Regiment – 14 killed in action
- 73rd Naval Special Purpose Center – 10 killed in action
- 140th Special Purpose Center – 5 killed in action

== Structure ==
Special Operations Forces General Command, in Kyiv, Kyiv Oblast

- 99th Headquarters and Support Battalion (А3628), in Brovary, Kyiv Oblast
- 142nd Training Center of SSO (А2772), in Berdychiv, Zhytomyr Oblast
- Recruitment Center of SSO, in Kyiv
- 77th State Secrets Protection Center (A4327)
- 111th Information and Telecommunications Node (A4423)
- Signal Regiment (A4423), in Kyiv

=== Parts of Informational and Psychological Warfare ===
- 16th Center of Information and Psychological Warfare (A1182), Guyva, Zhytomyr region
- 72nd Center of Information and Psychological Warfare (А4398), Brovary, Kyiv region
- 74th Center of Information and Psychological Warfare (A1277), Lviv
- 83rd Center of Information and Psychological Warfare (A2455), Odessa

=== Special Purpose Combat Units (Land) ===
- Special Operations Center East (А0680), in Kropyvnytskyi, Kirovohrad Oblast
- Special Operations Center West (А0553), in Khmelnytskyi, Khmelnytskyi Oblast
- Special Operations Center North
- 140th Special Purpose Center (А0661), in Khmelnytskyi, Khmelnytskyi Oblast
- 47th Separate Special Purpose Detachment (А2620), Zaporizhzhia
- 7th Special Operations Center "Ukrainian Volunteer Corps"
- "Ranger" Corps SOF-AFU
  - 4th Special Purpose Regiment
  - 5th Special Purpose Regiment
  - 6th Special Purpose Regiment
  - 7th Special Purpose Regiment

==== Attached Ground Combat Units ====
- Separate Black Fog Detachment, in Kamyanske, Dnipropetrovsk Oblast
- Separate Special Tactical Group Irpin, Irpin, Bucha Raion
- Special Purpose Sabotage Unit (А4790), Brovary, Kyiv Oblast
- Military unit A4804, Lviv

=== Partisan movement ===
- Rukh Oporu
  - National Resistance Center
    - Kharkiv Resistance Center
    - Khmelnytskyi Resistance Center
    - Kyiv Resistance Center
    - Oleksandriia Resistance Center
    - Zakarpattia Resistance Center
  - Rukh Oporu North
  - Rukh Oporu East
  - Tactical Group Kruk

=== Special Purpose Combat Units (Marine) ===
- Special Operations Center South (А3199), in Ochakiv, Mykolaiv Oblast

=== Special Purpose Combat Units (Air force) ===
- 35th Mixed Aviation Squadron (А3199), Havryshivka Air Base, Vinnytsia region

== Commanders ==
- Lieutenant General Ihor Lunov (2016–2020)
- Major General Hryhorii Halahan (25 August 2020 – 26 July 2022)
- Brigadier General Viktor Khorenko (July 2022 – 3 November 2023)
- Colonel Serhii Lupanchuk (3 November 2023 – n/a)
- Brig. Gen. Oleksandr Trepak (n/a)

== See also ==
- 10th Special Detachment
