= 47th Special Operations Detachment (Ukraine) =

47th Separate Special Operations Detachment
- 47-й окремий загін спеціального призначення
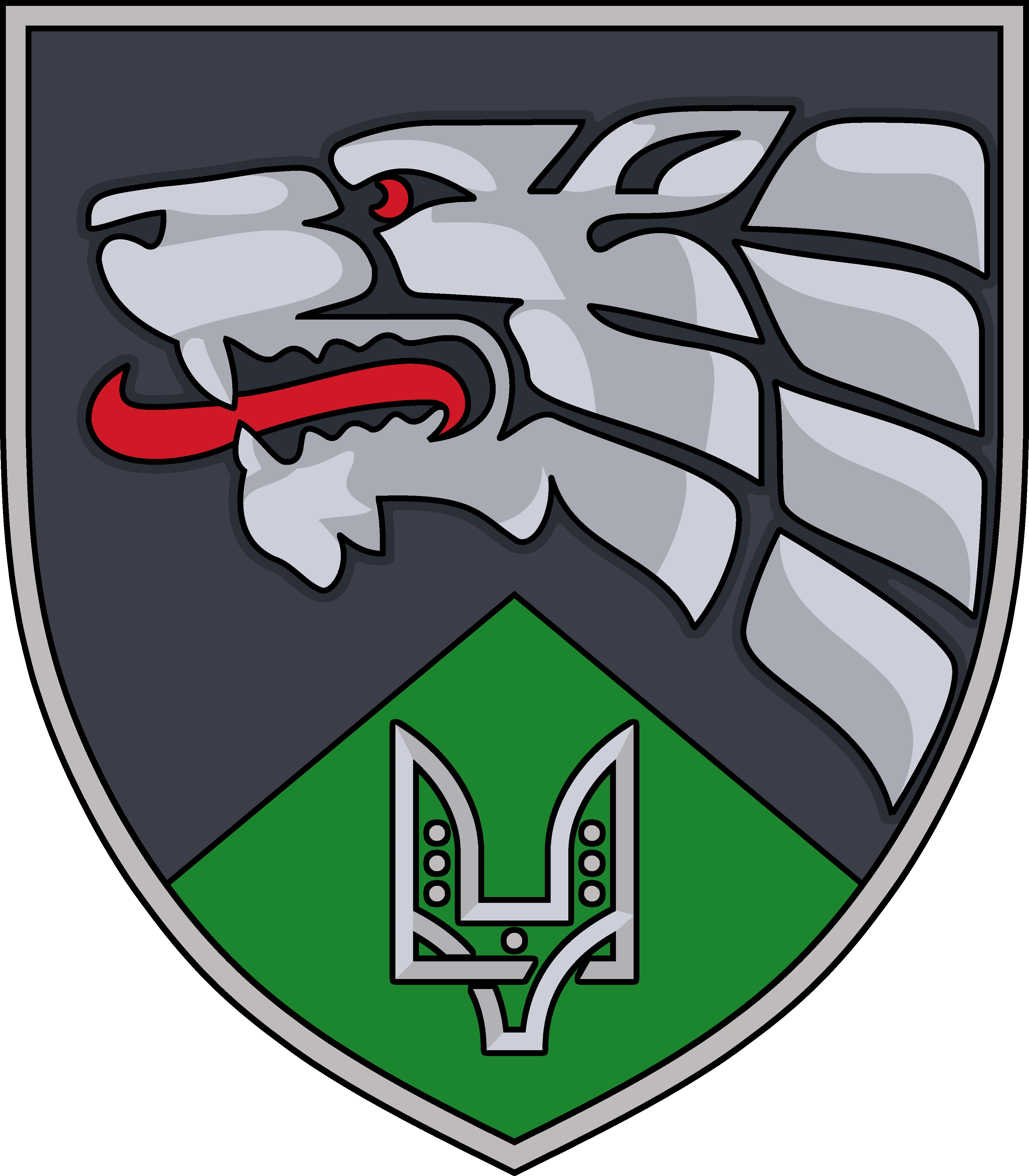
- Insignia
- Active: 2020-present
- Country: Ukraine
- Branch: Ukrainian Special Operations Forces
- Role: Special Operations
- Engagements: Russo-Ukrainian War: War in Donbas; Russian invasion of Ukraine

The 47th Special Operations Detachment (MUN A2620) is a battalion level detachment of the Ukrainian Special Operations Forces, active since at least 2020, this detachment is highly secretive in its operations. It has been involved in both the War in Donbass and the Russian invasion of Ukraine.

== History ==
On 13 October 2020, near Kramatorsk, two soldiers of the detachment (Suprigan Andriy Valeriyovych and Kuzmenko Dmytro Pavlovich) were killed by falling into the water while attempting a low-altitude landing from a helicopter.

Following the start of the Russian invasion of Ukraine, the detachment under the command of Colonel Zakharevich carried out several operations behind Russian lines with its commander himself killing several Russian soldiers in combat.

== Structure ==
- Management & Headquarters
- Team Vepr

== Commanders ==
- Serhii Zakharevych (?-?)
