= 72nd Psychological and Information Warfare Center (Ukraine) =

- 72-й центр інформаційно-психологічних операцій
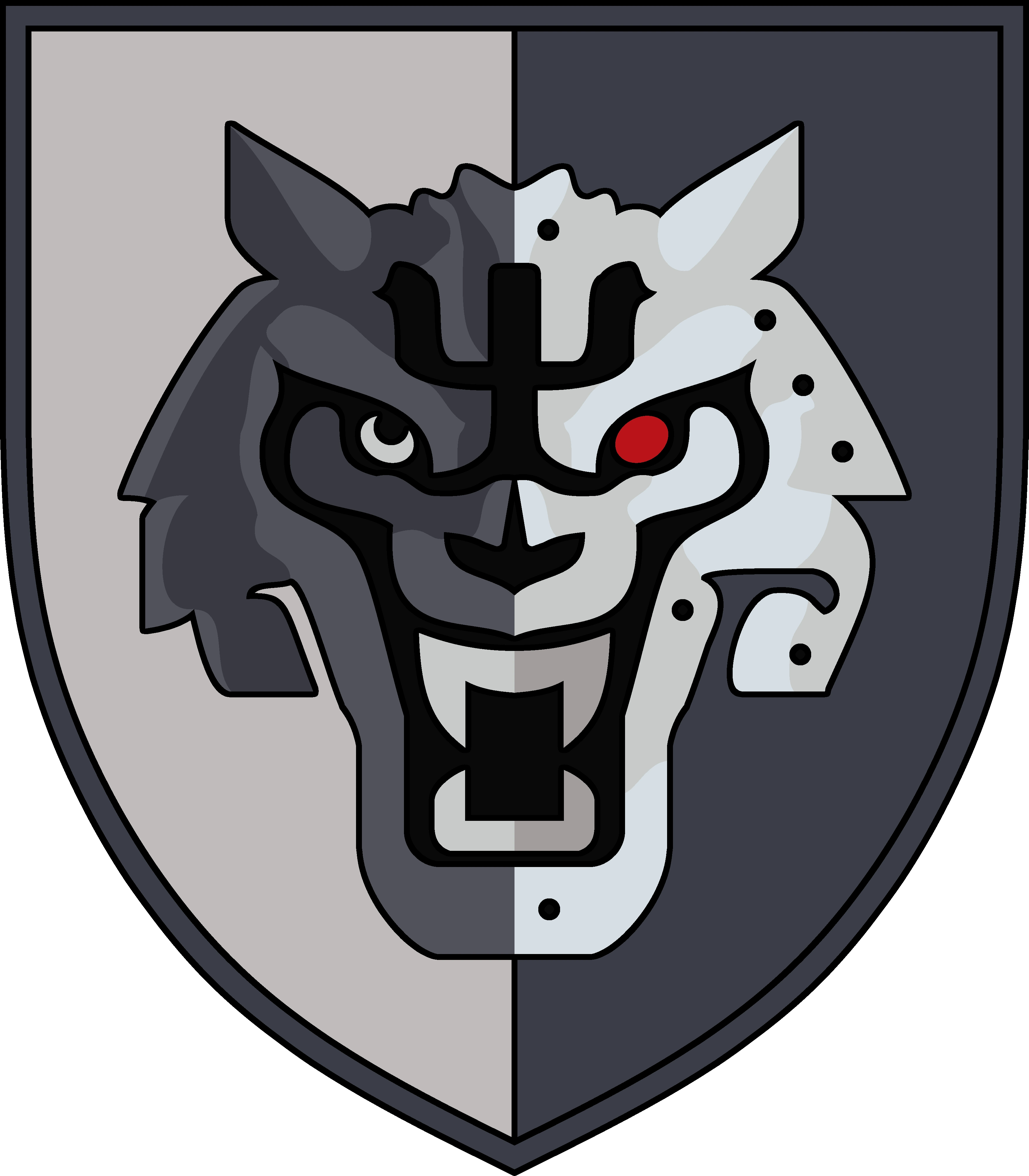
- Regiment Insignia
- Active: 2003-present
- Country: Ukraine
- Allegiance: Ukrainian Ground Forces
- Branch: Ukrainian Navy (2003-2016); Ukrainian Special Operations Forces (2016-)
- Type: Regiment
- Role: psychological warfare and informational warfare
- Garrison/HQ: Kyiv (2014-); Sevastopol (2007-2014)
- Engagements: Russo-Ukrainian War: Russian Invasion of Crimea; War in Donbass; 2022 Russian Invasion of Ukraine; Syrian Civil war: Battle of Khasham (alleged remote psychological support)
- Decorations: Courage and Bravery

The 72nd Psychological and Information Warfare Center is a unit of the Ukrainian Special Operations Forces (SOF) concerned with psychological warfare and informational warfare. It was established in 2007 as a part of the Ukrainian Navy and was headquartered at Sevastopol till it was captured by Russia in 2014. It became a part of the SOF in 2016 and is currently headquartered at Kyiv.

== History ==
The Regiment was established in 2003 under the subordination of the Ukrainian Navy and Serhii Mykhailovych Lysenko, was appointed as its commander. It was tasked with detecting and thwarting informational and psychological threats directed against the Ukrainian Navy, and providing informational and analytical support to the Ukrainian Navy.

On March 2, 2014, during the Russian Invasion of Crimea, the regiment resisted the assault of Russian Armed Forces by using BTR-80 based sound transmitting station as an armored combat vehicle, and along with the personnel of the 191st training unit of the Ukrainian Navy, prevented the capture of the Barracks by the Russian Spetsnaz. Then they held out for three weeks as the Russians issued two ultimatums for surrender. On March 22, the Russian Armed Forces drove a Tigr Armoured Vehicle and special equipment for jamming mobile communications to regiment's holdout as the personnel barricaded themselves inside the building preparing for a battle. But some amongst these personnel switched sides informing the Russians about the building's weak points. The center was then captured by the Russian forces on March 23 being the last holdout of Ukrainian Navy in Crimea. The commander of the unit, Vyacheslav Demyanenko, was kidnapped by the "little green men" and was detained by them for around ten days before being released on 3 April. Fourteen personnel of the regiment defected to Russia after the occupation of Crimea.

On 17 February 2018, following the Battle of Khasham during the Syrian civil war, the 72nd Psychological Warfare Center was alleged by the Russian military to have provided psychological warfare support to anti-Russian forces by dispersion of "propaganda" about the number of casualties.

The center is also currently engaged in psychological warfare during the Russo-Ukrainian war. On 1 March 2022, the Center's infrastructure and operational sites were alleged to have been hit by Russian airstrikes.

== Structure ==
Its structure includes four departments directed at various roles within the parameters of the regiment:

- Analytical Department
- Surveillance and Special Operations Department
- News propaganda Department
- Information and Technology Department

== Commanders ==
- Serhii Mykhailovych Lysenko
- Bolotnikov Yevhen Gennadiyovych
- Volodymyr Muratovych Tsaloev
- Vyacheslav Mykhailovych Demyanenko

== Sources ==
- Військовий експерт розповів як Україна може протистояти РФ в інформаційній війні
