= 99th Headquarters and Support Battalion (Ukraine) =

- 99-й окремий батальйон управління та забезпечення
- Battalion Insignia
- Active: 2016-present
- Country: Ukraine
- Allegiance: Armed Forces of Ukraine
- Branch: Ukrainian Special Operations Forces
- Type: Battalion
- Role: Rear support, Armament, Morale and psychological support and Combat support
- Part of: SOF General Command
- Garrison/HQ: Brovary
- Engagements: Russo-Ukrainian War: War in Donbass; 2022 Russian Invasion of Ukraine
- Decorations: Courage and Bravery

Commanders
- Current commander: Pavliy Oleksandr Stepanovych

Insignia
- Field Insignia

The 99th Headquarters and Support Battalion is a separate and independent battalion of the Ukrainian Special Operations Forces tasked mostly with management, logistics and rear support but also to some extent, combat support to other units of the SOF. It was established in 2016 and is garrisoned at Brovary.

== History ==
The battalion was established on 14 March 2016, along with the creation of the Special Operations Forces to ensure the provision of support to SOF mainly in four fields: rear support, armament, morale and psychological support and combat support.

The battalion was initially garrisoned at Berdychiv in Zhytomyr Oblast, but was later transferred to Brovary in Kyiv Oblast.

Since August 2017, the 99th Separate Command and Support Battalion has been providing support to other units of Special Operations Forces during the War in Donbass and later in the Russo-Ukrainian war. The battalion's volleyball team also won the first veteran volleyball championship in Ukraine.

== Commanders ==
- Pavliy Oleksandr Stepanovych
