= 142nd training center of the SOF =

- Ukrainian: 142-й навчальний центр ССО
- Founded: December 6, 2016
- Country: Ukraine
- Allegiance: Armed Forces of Ukraine
- Branch: Ukrainian Special Operations Forces
- Type: Training center
- Part of: SOF General Command
- Garrison/HQ: Berdychiv, Zhytomyr Oblast
- Motto: Victory loves diligence

The 142nd training center of the SOF (Ukrainian: 142-й навчальний центр ССО) is a training center of special operations forces of Ukraine.

== History ==
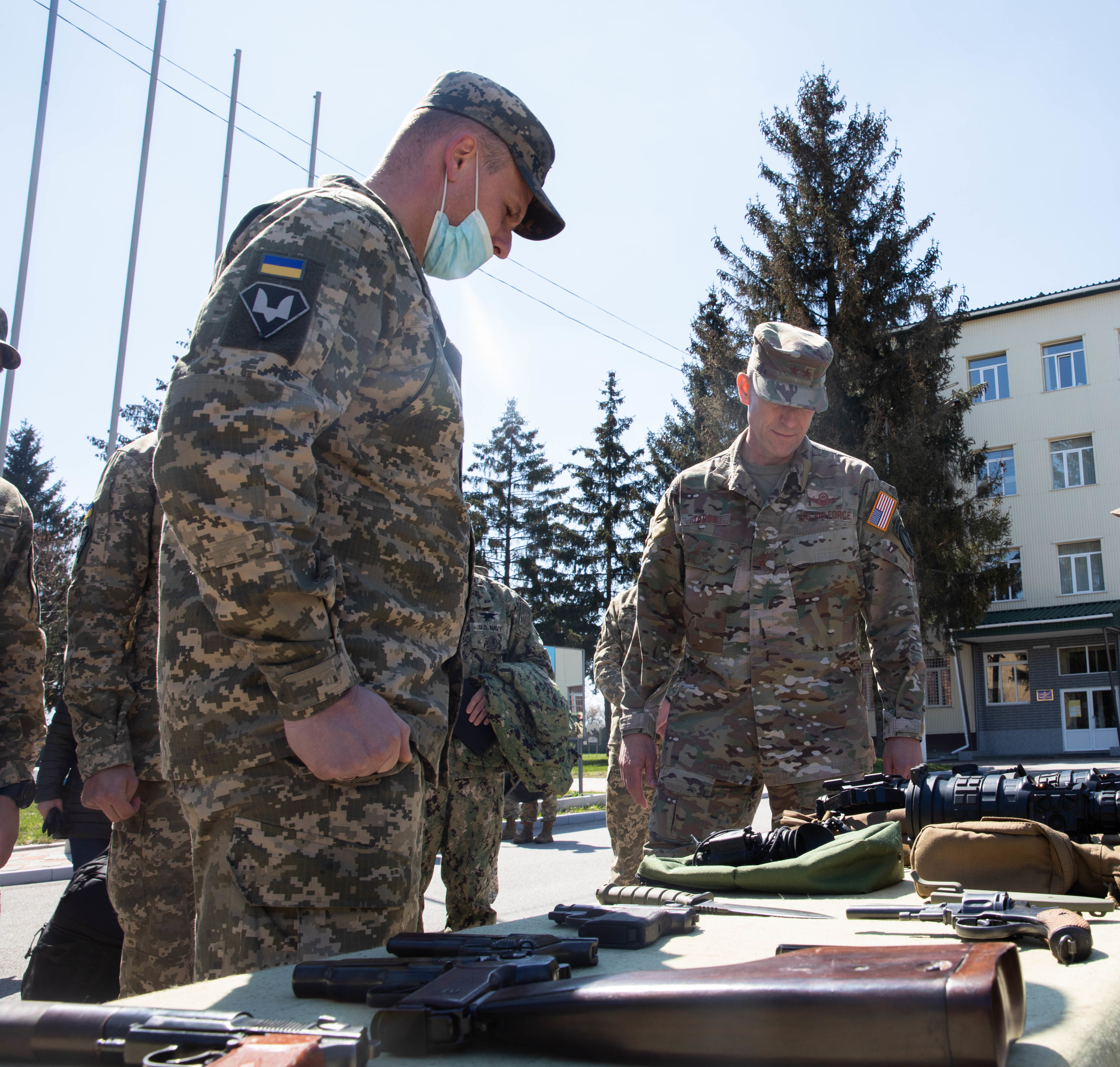
Brief about weapons that are trained on at the 142nd Training Center in April 2021.

On May 14, 2016, the first graduation of 29 instructors of the training center of the Special Operations Forces of the qualification course as part of the program of the United Multinational Group (i.e. the United States, Lithuania, Latvia, Estonia) took place.

On November 15, 2016, 35 instructors of the Special Operations Forces of the Armed Forces of Ukraine graduated in Khmelnytskyi. Special Operations Forces instructors were trained within the framework of a qualification course that lasted 6 months in accordance with the program of the Joint Multinational Group (i.e. the United States, Lithuania, Latvia, Estonia) training — "Ukraine" (JMTG-U).

The grand opening of the center took place on December 6, 2016, with the participation of the President of Ukraine, who presented the battle banner. At the time of the opening, it was noted, that 58 instructors of the centre completed qualification courses led by instructors from NATO partner countries. In addition, the Center includes highly professional fighters who gained combat experience during the ATO, of which more than 30 were awarded state and departmental awards.

From July 18, 2017, the training center (under the simplified taxation system) was planned to switch to a new buffet-type food system.

On July 29, 2017, the Minister of Defense of Ukraine announced an increase in funding for special operations forces, in particular, additional funds are planned to be directed to the development of the training center.

On June 4–9, 2018, competitions for the best specialist in tactical medicine of the Special Operations Forces were held on the basis of the center.

In September 2018, the center received lightweight body armor and new ballistic helmets from UaRms, SPE "Temp-3000" and "DISI".

On the basis of the center, it is planned to create a training complex with underground engineering communications for the training of special forces.

On August 24, 2022, the training center was awarded the honorary award "For Courage and Bravery".
