= Omega group =

Ukrainian special forces unit

Special Operations Center "Omega"
- Центр спеціального призначення «Омега» Tsentr spetsial'noho pryznachennya "Omeha"
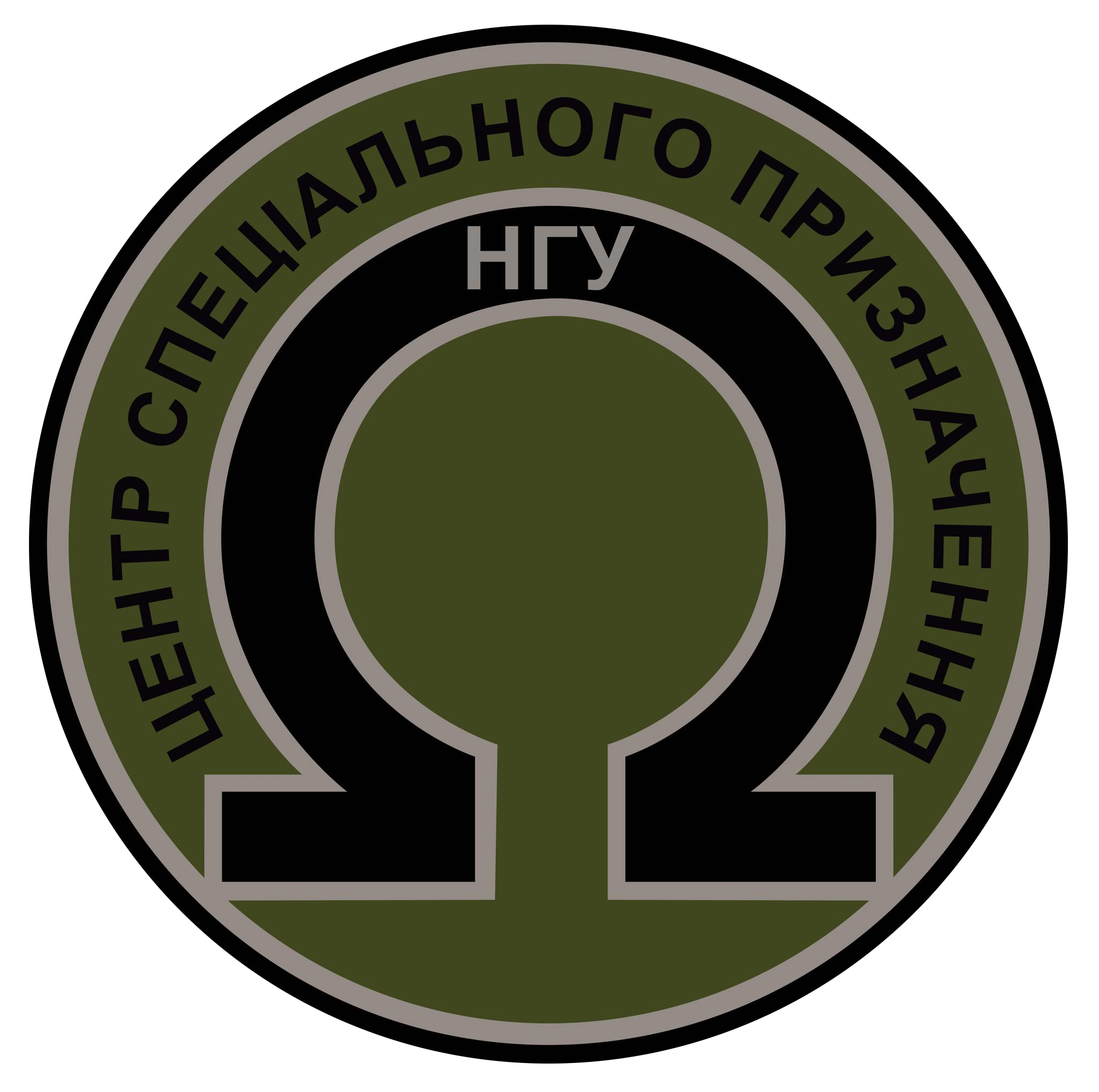
- Founded: 4 April 2003; 23 years ago
- Country: Ukraine
- Branch: Internal Troops of Ukraine (2003 – 2014); National Guard of Ukraine (2014 – present)
- Type: Special forces
- Garrison/HQ: Novi Petrivtsi
- Engagements: Russian invasion of Ukraine; Northern Ukraine campaign; Battle of Antonov Airport; Battle of Irpin; Battle of Moshchun; Battle of Horenka; Battle of Ivankiv; Battle of Kyiv; Battle of Kharkiv; Battle of Sievierodonetsk; Battle of Lysychansk; Battle of Bakhmut; Battle of Vuhledar; Battle of Avdiivka
- Website: https://omegasof.army

Special Operations Center "Omega"(Ukrainian: Центр спеціального призначення «Омега»), also known as Omega group, is a special forces unit that is part of the National Guard of Ukraine. Originally intended for counterterrorism and bodyguard missions, the group has gained extensive combat experience conducting ambushes, raids and reconnaissance missions while behind enemy lines in Kharkiv and Donetsk during the Russian invasion of Ukraine that started in 2022.

== History ==
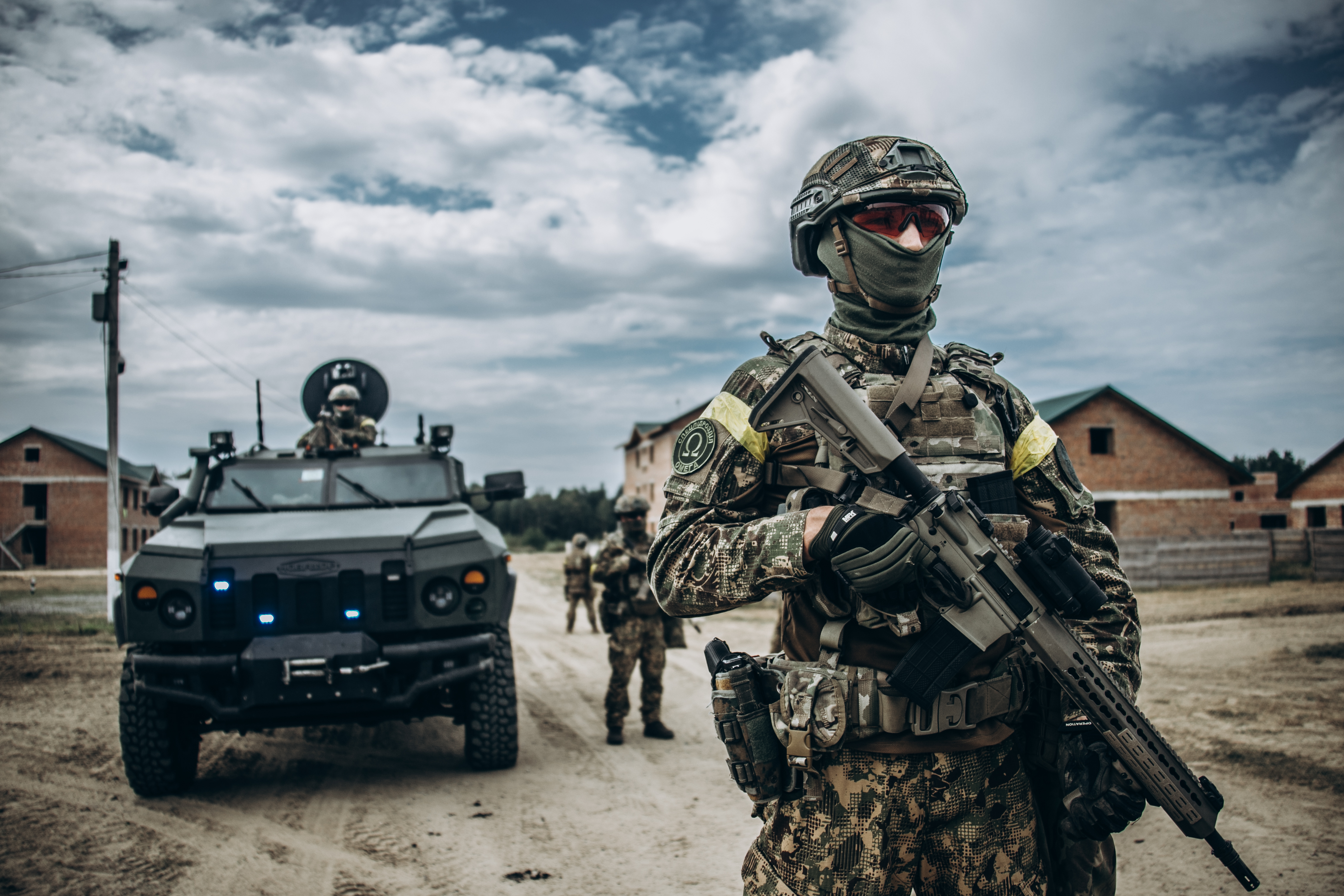
Members of the Omega group

Omega was originally founded as a counterterrorist unit within the Internal Troops of Ukraine in 2003. When the Internal Troops were dissolved in 2014, the unit was transferred to the newly-formed National Guard as five separate detachments, stationed in Kyiv, Kharkiv, Odesa, Lviv and Oleksandriia. These detachments were combined into the current Special Operations Center in the fall of 2022.

Since the Russian invasion of Ukraine, Omega has been deployed all along the frontline. In the first days of the invasion, members of the unit participated in the battle of Hostomel airport. Omega troops subsequently defended several settlements around Kyiv, including Moshchun, Horenka and Irpin. At the same time, other Omega guardsmen defended Kharkiv.

In the spring of 2022, Omega members evacuated a group of artillerymen from the 36th Marine Brigade from Russian-held territory. The marines had escaped from Mariupol, and had already moved 60 kilometers through enemy territory before the Omega unit was deployed. While a Leleka UAV was used to guide the marines around Russian positions, lightly equipped Omega members moved into enemy territory to meet their countrymen and escort them back to safety.

In April 2022, Omega members conducted reconnaissance and sabotage missions around Kreminna. Later that year, the unit took part in the battle of Vuhledar, specifically in the village of Pavlivka, where they fought the Russian 155th Naval Infantry Brigade.

In late 2023 and early 2024, Omega fighters were deployed in and around Avdiivka, where they inflicted heavy Russian losses using anti-tank guided missiles and FPV drones, as well as improvised multiple launch rocket systems. During this period, videos posted on social media also showed Omega snipers move into Russian-held areas to engage Russian soldiers.

In April 2024, the commander of the National Guard of Ukraine, Oleksandr Pivnenko, said a night assault was conducted by members of the Omega group in Zaporizhzhia Oblast. According to Pivnenko, the members of the unit approached a basement occupied by Russian soldiers while coordinating actions with air and fire support, throwing grenades into the basement. In December 2024, Militarnyi reported that soldiers from the Omega unit had stormed Russian trenches and engaged in close combat in the Pokrovsk sector, the unit sharing footage of the assault on its social media pages.

In 2026, Militarnyi said that the Omega group had destroyed a Sukhoi Su-24 at Saki airfield in Crimea using two Hornet drones more than 185 kilometers from the frontline. In a video published by the National Guard of Ukraine corroborating the strike, the Su-24M is shown to be in poor condition suggesting it was not airworthy or possibly being used as a decoy and for spare parts.

== Members ==
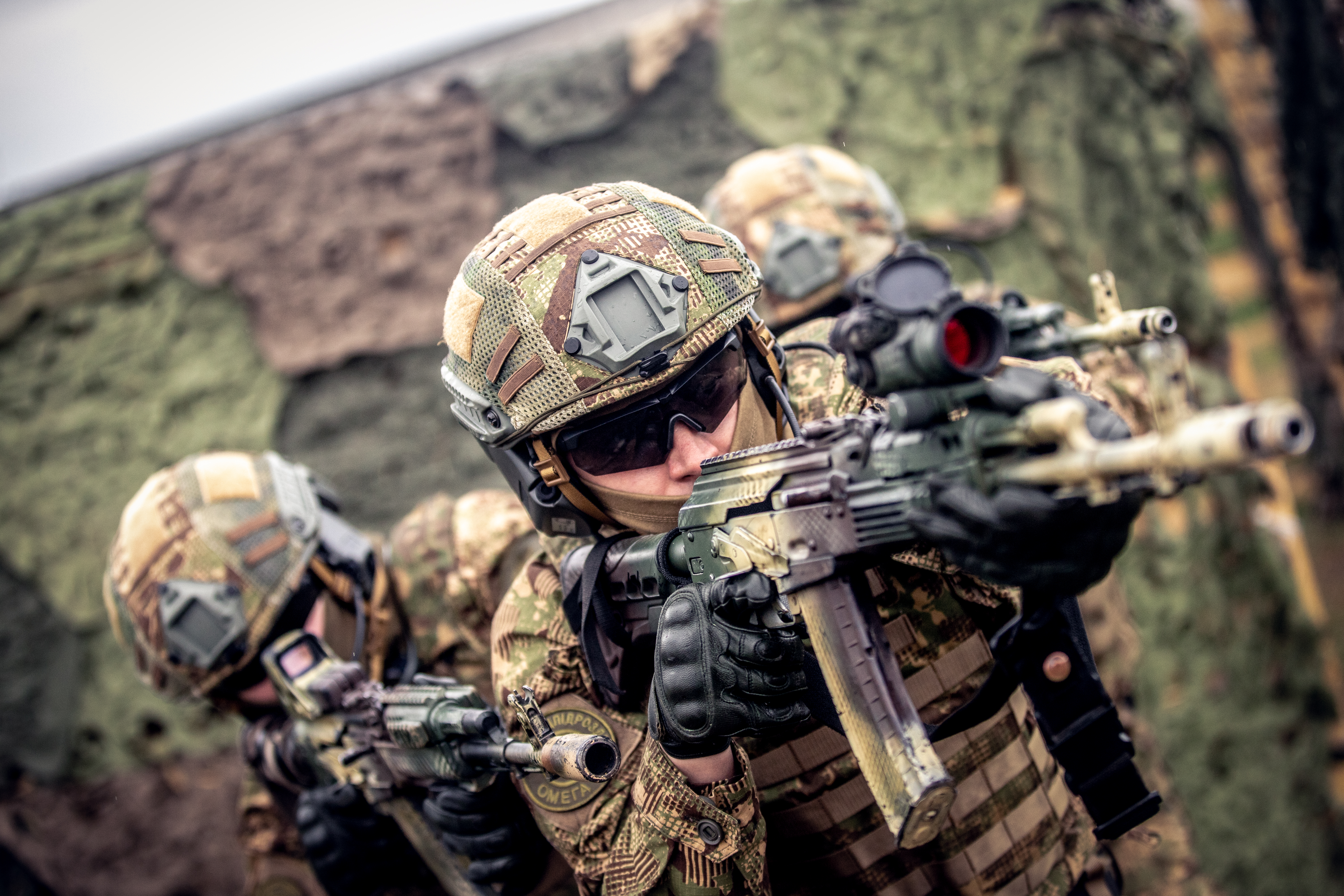

Reportedly, most of the members of the Omega group are former members of Ukrainian and, in rare cases, Soviet commando units. The unit generally avoids publicity.

== See also ==
- Alpha Group
- Kraken Regiment
