= Special Operations Center "West" (Ukraine) =

Special Operations Center "West"(2022-) 8th Special Operations Regiment (2003-2022) 8th Special Operations Brigade (1992-2003)
- Окремий центр спеціальних операцій «Захід»
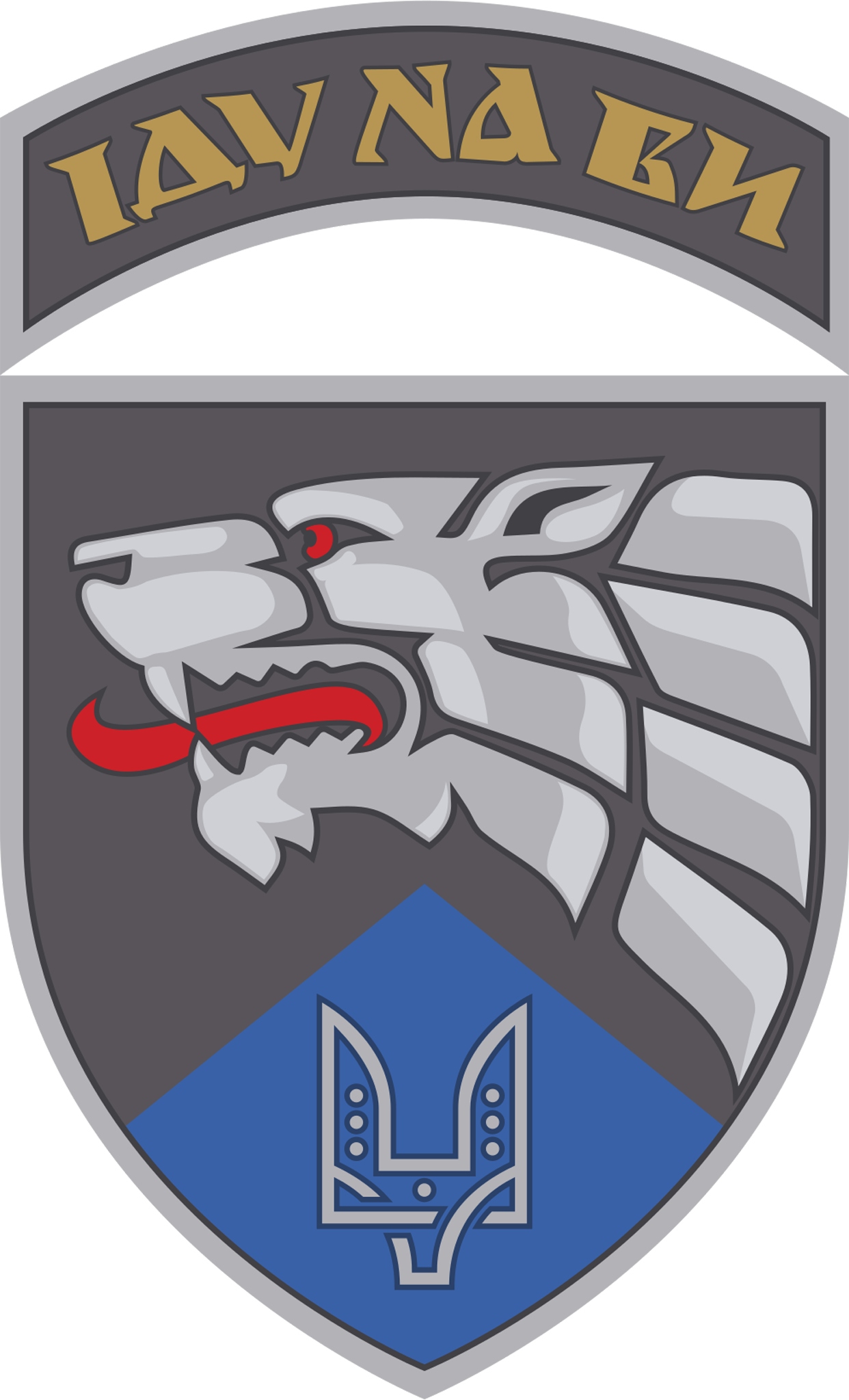
- Regiment Insignia
- Active: 1992-present
- Country: Ukraine
- Allegiance: Ukraine
- Branch: Ukrainian Ground Forces (1992-2016); Ukrainian Special Operations Forces (2016-)
- Type: Regiment
- Role: Special Operations
- Garrison/HQ: Khmelnytskyi
- Nickname: Prince Izyaslav Mstislavich Regiment
- Engagements: Peacekeeping Operations: MNF-I; UNAMSIL; UNMIL; Russo-Ukrainian War: War in Donbas; Russian Invasion of Ukraine; 2024 Kursk offensive
- Decorations: Courage and Bravery

Commanders
- Current commander: Colonel Andrii Arkadiyovych Matviishen

Insignia
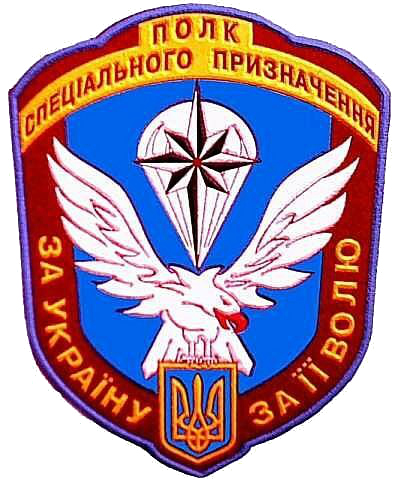
- Shoulder Patch

8th Special Operations Regiment or the Special Operations Center "West" ("Prince Izyaslav Mstislavych"), unit number A0553, is a regiment of the Special Operations Forces. It is headquartered in the city of Khmelnytskyi and a part of the Joint Rapid Reaction Forces. Since 2014, the regiment has participated in the many battles of the Russo-Ukrainian War being reformed into a separate special operations center in 2022.

== History ==
=== Establishment ===
After the Dissolution of the Soviet Union, the 8th Special Brigade of the Red Army was subordinated to the Ukrainian Ministry of Defence.

In September 2003, the unit was reformed from a brigade to the 8th Special Purpose Regiment (A0553).

=== Foreign Deployment ===
Since February 18, 2004, a platoon of the unit was deployed for peacekeeping operations in Wasit Governorate in Iraq, as well as in Sierra Leone, Liberia and other conflict zones.

=== Military training exercises ===
The regiment participated in multiple large scale military exercises, including the "Adequate response-2011" and "Perspectives-2012".

In 2012, the regiment was described as "the best part of intelligence" of the Ukrainian Ground Forces.

In 2013, athletes of the 8th special purpose regiment won the military applied sports championship of Ukrainian Ground Forces.

In 2013, the regiment also conducted training at the Havryshiv military airfield, near Vinnytsia which included an airborne assault with an An-26, capturing command posts amongst other objectives.

On February 15, 2014, a meeting of the leadership of the military intelligence of the Ground Forces of the Armed Forces of Ukraine was held at the 8th regiment's base.

=== War in Donbas ===
The regiment participated in multiple combat operations during the War in Donbas

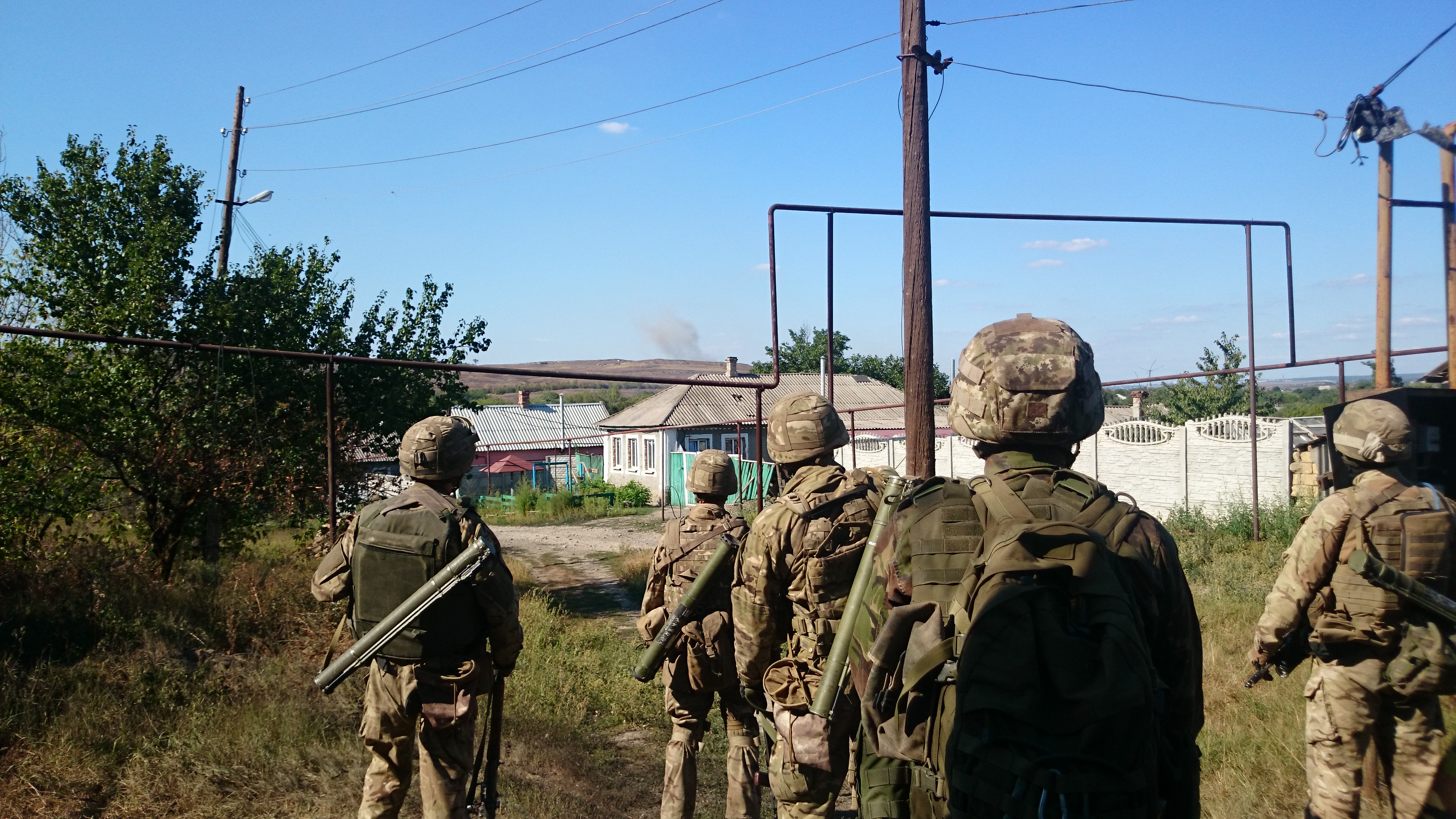
Personnel of the 8th Regiment in Donetsk Oblast during the War in Donbas

==== 2014 ====
In June 2014, the 8th regiment took part in a battle against the pro Russian separatists near the city of Shchastya in Luhansk Oblast suffering multiple wounded.

The 8th Regiment was involved in the rescue operation of an An-26 shot down by separatists over the territory occupied by them. Four crew members were rescued while two were captured by separatists.

The regiment was also involved in clearance operations in more than 18 administrative buildings of the city of Kramatorsk.

On June 17, 2014, during the battle of Shchastya, personnel from the 8th special forces regiment were sent as reinforcement to relieve the Aidar Battalion under encirclement, five special forces were wounded by separatist APC and RPG and one of the personnel Yevgeny Oleksandrovich Zelenskyi, died on June 24 from his wounds and was posthumously awarded the Hero of Ukraine.

On July 9, 2014, a KAMAZ vehicle of the regiment with 8 personnel was ambushed near the village of Muratove killing one soldier (Savanchuk Victor Yuriyovych) and wounding three others.

On July 20, 2014, the regiment under the command of Major Oleksandr Petrakivskyi took part in the Battle of Luhansk Airport, securing the passage of Ukrainian military to the airport, Major Oleksandr was wounded in action. Regiment personnel moved in two strike forces, one reached first and provided cover to the second, numbering 14 people under the leadership of Petrakivskyi continued to advance. After a reconnaissance mission, they decided to strike deep into separatist territory, after advancing a few hundred metres, they were attacked by Rocket Propelled Grenades but they missed, the regiment personnel continued to advance facing stiff resistance from the separatists and retaliated inflicting losses on the separatists. Several of the regiment's personnel were wounded including the gunner who was wounded severely. The regiment's convoy had to be stopped and take up defense but their position was shelled by mortar, injuring a large number of soldiers including Oleksandr Petrakivskyi who was wounded in the head. The battle lasted 5 hours, ending with the evacuation of the personnel on APCs. Two personnel of the regiment Pavlo Ilchuk and Andrii Vasylyshyn were killed in action.

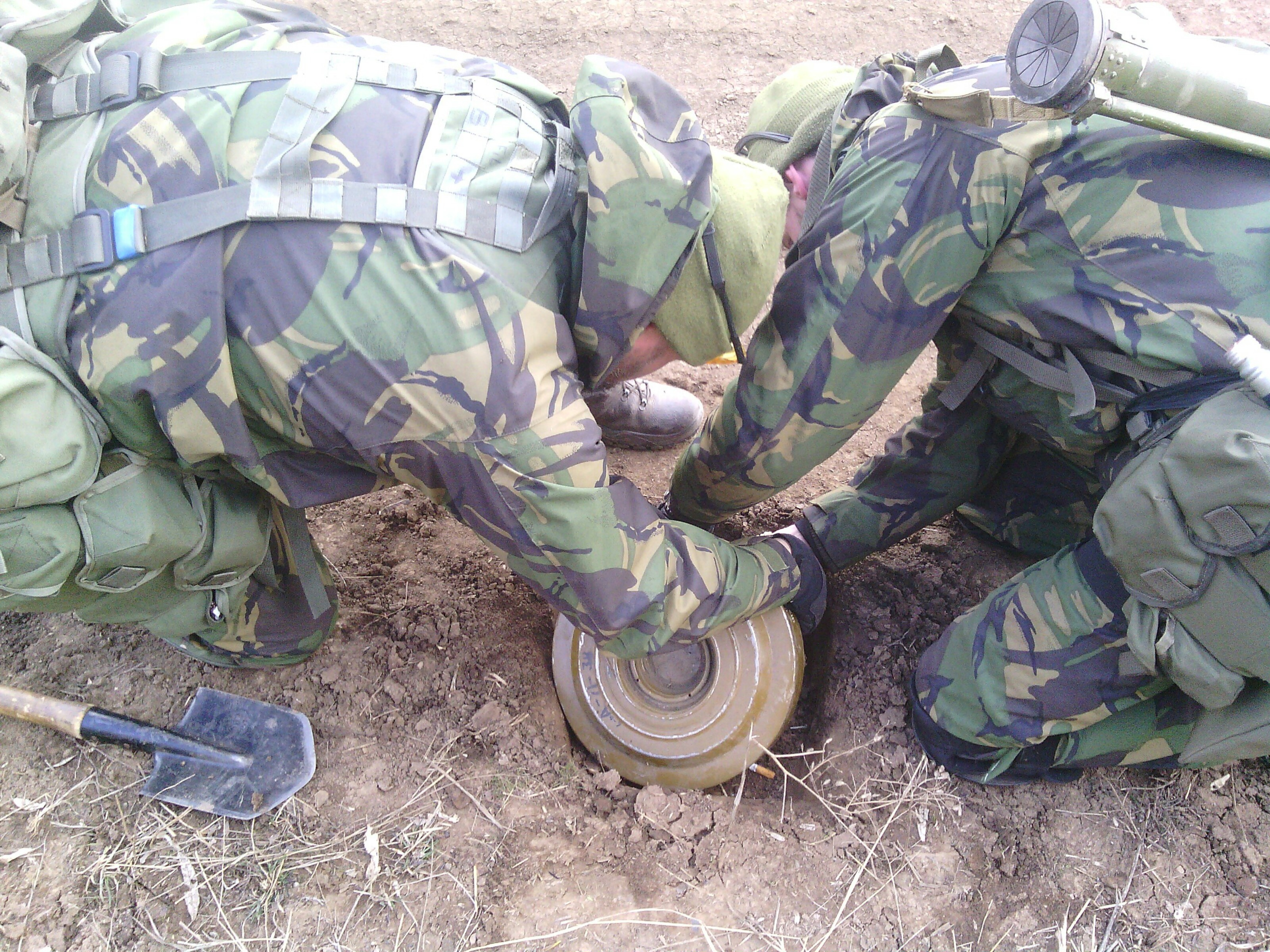
8th Regiment personnel installing an anti tank landmine during the War in Donbas

On August 26, 2014, the regiment participated in the Battle of Ilovaisk, the city was penetrated by separatists. An Armored Personnel Carrier carrying the regiment personnel came under artillery fire leading to the death of a soldier of the regiment (Oleksandr Valeriyovych). Another soldier (Andriyuk Yevhen Oleksandrovych) died in the same battle on an unknown date.

==== 2015 ====
On January 29, 2015, the 8th separate regiment captured Igla MANPADS, five MON-100 anti-personnel mines, PB suppressed handguns, Russian military uniform, machine guns and cartridges belonging to the separatists in the Luhansk Oblast.

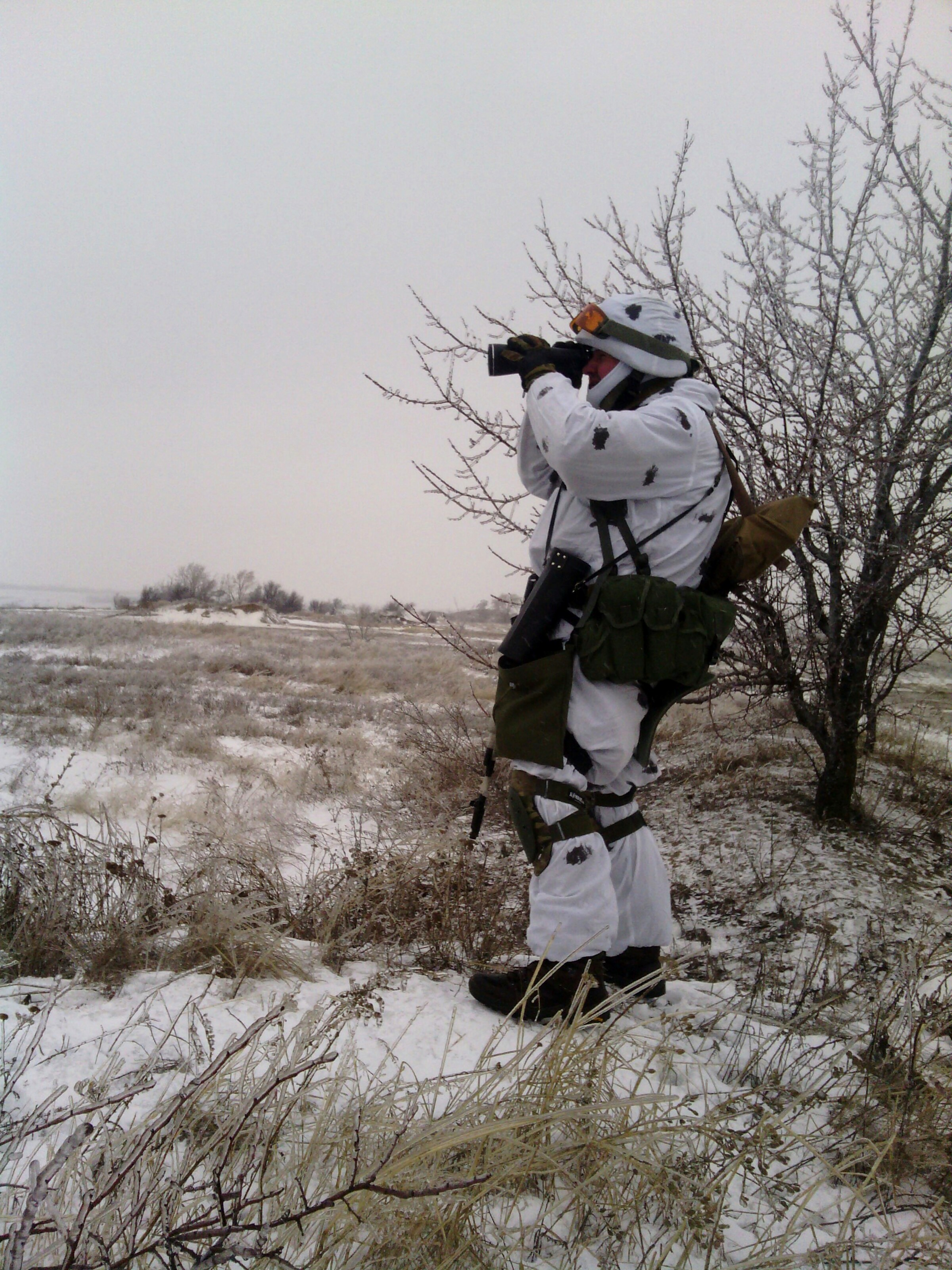
8th Regiment soldier on a reconnaissance operation in 2015

In February 2015, the 8th Special Purpose Regiment under the command of Major Yevgeny Slominsky operated in the village of Khoroshe.

On February 10, 2015, a rocket attack by separatists on Kramatorsk Airport using BM-30 Smerch MLRS, led to the deaths of one soldier of the regiment (Yevhen Valeriyovych Bushnin) amongst others.

On February 14, during the Battle of Debaltseve, units of the regiment and 73rd Naval Special Operations Regiment guarded the section of the Debaltseve-Artemivsk highway in the Luhansk Oblast for the safe withdrawal of Ukrainian troops.

The regiment participated in the Battle of Shchastia and on July 7, 2015, a KAMAZ of the regiment was ambushed by separatists who attacked using machine guns and grenade launchers leading to the death of one soldier (Volodymyr Serhiyovych Brozhko) of the regiment and wounding of three others.

In September 2015, the regiment conducted mine clearance operations in the village of Krymske, Novoaidar Raion while simultaneously engaging the separatists in a battle, a soldier of the regiment (Oleksandr Oleksandrovych Mandybura) was killed and two were wounded in a landmine explosion.

==== 2016 ====
The unit became a part of the Special Operations Forces (Ukraine) with its establishment in January 2016.

On July 23, 2016, the unit took part in a battle with separatists near the village of Novozvanivka, Popasna Raion. They discovered advancing militants and attacked them killing two and wounding eight separatists. The soldiers captured a huge cache of weapons, mines, and ammunition belonging to the separatists. To stop Ukrainians from taking the captured weaponry, the separatists started attacking using 82 mm mortars and 160 mm mortar M1943, AGS-17, SPG-9, an anti-aircraft gun, a 122-mm self-propelled gun, and later also a tank killing a soldier (Serhiy Shadskikh) and wounding four others.

Then about 20 separatists attacked the Ukrainian positions but were repulsed after having two separatists killed and five wounded. The Ukrainians temporarily retreated and then came back, to prevent further attack they carried out an operation during which a soldier (Roman Mykhailovych Matviets) died and three were wounded, meanwhile five more separatists were also killed.

==== 2017 ====
On June 24, 2017, the regiment was involved in a combat operation in the village of Sokilnyky, Novoaidar Raion and while returning they came across a minefield killing two soldiers of the regiment (Ishchuk Oleksii Vasyliovych and Vasyl Mykhailovych Lavrys).

The regiment participated in the Battle of Slavyansk (2019) and on July 18, 2019, he died during an engagement with the militants a soldier of the regiment (Bogdan Dmytrovych Bigus) was killed and another was seriously wounded.

==== 2019 ====
On September 10, 2019, a group of the regiment was ambushed while returning from a combat mission in the Luhansk Oblast killing a soldier of the regiment (Maksym Volodymyrovych Kondratyuk).

==== 2021 ====
On December 6, 2021, at the 30th anniversary of the establishment of the Armed Forces of Ukraine, fifteen Humvees were transferred to the unit as a part of an arms package from the United States.

=== Full-scale invasion ===
==== 2022 ====
In 2022, after the Full scale Russian Invasion of Ukraine, the regiment was called as the Special Operations Center "West" and was given an honorary name of Prince Izyaslav Mstislavich and was awarded the honorary award "For Courage and Bravery (Ukraine)" on August 24, 2022.

On April 13, 2022, while operating in the Joint Forces Operation territory, the regiment engaged with the Russians, the engagement led to the death of one soldier of the regiment (Maksym Volodymyrovych Kondratyuk).

The regiment performed several covert operations, the details of which were being kept classified.

==== 2023 ====
The regiment participated in the Battle of Bakhmut and on July 14, 2023, a soldier of the regiment (Tegza Anatoly Yaroslavovych) was killed outside Bakhmut during an assault on enemy positions while saving others of the regiment and another brigade from snipers. Also, during the Battle of Bakhmut the regiment also successfully destroyed a Russian Su-25 attempting to assault their positions.

On June 21, 2023, another soldier of the regiment (Artem Oleksandrovich Sokolovskyi) was killed in combat in the village of Vasylkivka near Bakhmut.

In the summer of 2023, the regiment's personnel operated on the Krynky bridgehead as part of the Dnipro campaign.

The regiment was involved in combat operations in the village of Verbove, Zaporizhzhia Oblast as a part of the 2023 Ukrainian Counteroffensive and a soldier of the unit (Atamanyuk Anton Mykhailovych) was killed in action on 15 October 2023.

==== 2024 ====
On 13 March 2024, the regiment conducted a large scale strike destroying two Russian tanks, a TOS-1A heavy flamethrower system, and three IFVs as well as killing 13 and wounding 12 Russian soldiers. On 22 March, the regiment killed 5 Russian soldiers, wounded 4 more, destroyed a Russian 82-mm mortar and damaged a Russian BMP.

On 26 April 2024, the regiment destroyed one APC and two IFVs and killed nine Russian soldiers and wounded three more in a singular strike.

The regiment took part in countering the 2024 Kharkiv offensive and on 7 June 2024, a soldier of the regiment, Denis Valeryovich, was killed in combat. On 13 June 2024, the regiment destroyed a Russian infantry fighting vehicle and two vehicles as well as striking two ammunition warehouses, in this operation four Russian soldiers were killed and were wounded.

A soldier of the regiment, Vladyslav Alexandrovych Bombela died on 11 July 2024 in Donetsk Oblast after being seriously injured and was posthumously awarded the Hero of Ukraine.

On 16 August 2024, during the 2024 Kursk offensive, the regiment published a video in which they ambushed a Russian truck, purportedly killing a dozen soldiers "in a few minutes". On 29 August 2024, a soldier of the regiment and a kickboxer, Roman Yuriyovych Holovatyuk was declared KIA. On 23 September 2024, two soldiers of the regiment, Andriy Horokholinsky and Kernychnyi Hennadiy Ruslanovych, were killed in combat.

== Structure ==
It is classified amongst the most combat ready regiments of the Ukrainian Armed Forces and is composed of the following subunits.

- Regiment Headquarters
- 1st Special Purpose Squad
- 2nd Special Purpose Squad
- 3rd Special Purpose Squad
- 4th Special Purpose Squad
- Personnel Security Squad
- Communications Squad

== Commanders ==
- Colonel Pavlo Oleksiiovych Davidyuk (1992–1994)
- Colonel Predchuk Anatoly Petrovych (1994–1999)
- Colonel Oleksandr Hryhorovych Shelykh (1999–2002)
- Lieutenant Colonel Ihor Valeriyovych Overin (2002-?)
- Lieutenant Colonel Hordiychuk Ihor Volodymyrovych (?-?)
- Lieutenant Colonel Serhii Hryhorovych Kryvonos (?-?)
- Lieutenant Colonel Denisyuk Vasyl (?-2011)
- Colonel Oleg Oleksandrovich Nechaev (2011–2019)
- Colonel Shablii Volodymyr Volodymyrovych (2019–2020)
- Colonel Andrii Arkadiyovych Matviishen (2020-)
