= Levan Pipia =

Georgian military leader (born 1990)

- ლევან ფიფია
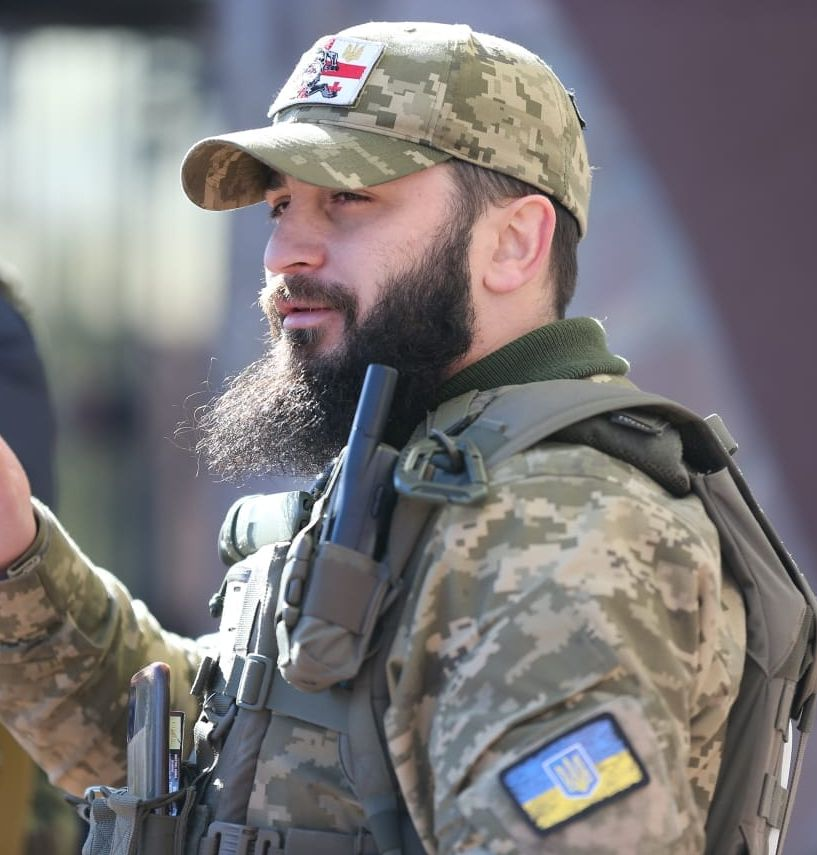
- Born: 11 August 1990 (age 36); Village of Jali, Ochamchire Municipality, Abkhazia, Georgia
- Military career
- Allegiance: Georgia; Ukraine
- Branch: Georgian Land Forces (2008); Ukrainian Ground Forces (2017–present)
- Rank: Deputy Commander
- Commands: Georgian Legion (2018-present)
- Conflicts: Russo-Georgian War Russo-Ukrainian War
- Awards: People's Hero of Ukraine

Levan Pipia (Georgian: ლევან ფიფია; Ukrainian: Леван Пипiя) (born on August 11, 1990, Village of Jali) is a Georgian military leader, Deputy Commander of the Georgian Legion in Ukraine and the Founder and the President of the Georgian Diaspora in Ukraine "Sakartvelo".

== Biography ==
Pipia was born on August 11, 1990, in Georgia, in the Village of Jali, Ochamchire municipality of the Autonomous Republic of Abkhazia.

In 1993, after the occupation of Abkhazia by Russia, he moved with his parents to the town of Jvari, Tsalenjikha municipality. From 2002 he lived in the capital city of Georgia, Tbilisi.

Pipia graduated from Initial Combat Training, Intelligence, Sniper, Engineering, Communications, Parachuting and Command Schools. He is a weapons specialist.

He served 10 years in the Armed Forces of Georgia. Pipia was the commander of snipers in a separate intelligence unit, intelligence instructor, head of the Sergeant Corps in the Army Reserve Training Center.

He participated in the 2008 Russia–Georgia war, in military-intelligence operations in Somalia and Afghanistan, in a number of special operations throughout Georgia.

In 2017, Pipia came to Ukraine and joined the Georgian Legion, fighting there as a sniper.

In 2018, he received the rank of chief sergeant of the Georgian Legion. In the same year, Pipia became the deputy commander of the Georgian Legion

In 2017–2023, with the Georgian Legion in Ukraine, he participated in operations in Avdiivka, Lisichansk, Bakhmut, Orikhiv, Huliaipole, Gostomel, Bucha, Irpin and Boryspil.

Pipia participated in 38 assaults. He has received 2 combat wounds.

Pipia has received the Gratitudes of the President of Georgia, the Minister of Defense and the General Staff. He has been awarded with 20 state orders and medals of Georgia and Ukraine, the Order of the Patriarchate of Ukraine.

For his special contribution to the fighting for the independence of Ukraine, Pipia received the most honorable non-state award of the country - the title of People's Hero of Ukraine.

Levan Pipia is the Founder and the President of the Georgian Diaspora in Ukraine "Sakartvelo".

Pipia is passionate about various sports, including football, karate, wushu, judo, MMA, as well as chess. He is a master of the Georgian martial art of Khridoli and was a member of the national team of the Ministry of Defense of Georgia in MMA and Khridoli.

His hobbies are painting, poetry and extreme sports.

Pipia is engaged in charity work. He curates a music school for displaced children from Abkhazia, helps and supports Georgian athletes and children without care, builds Orthodox shrines in the mountainous regions of Georgia.
