= Konstantin Lashkhia =

Kote Lashkhia

Konstantin (Kote) Lashkhia (1 September 1986, Sokhumi, Georgia - 2 July 2015, Mariupol, Ukraine) was a Georgian and Ukrainian military officer, tactical combat instructor, and fighter of the Georgian National Legion.

== Biography ==
During the Russia-Georgia war of 1992-1993, Kote, together with his mother and older sister, was trying to escape from the besieged Sukhumi. His father and elder brother were fighting against Russians and separatists at that time. Kote's father and older brother were shot by separatists and Russians.

In order to save Georgian civilians from ethnic cleansing, the Ukrainian military launched a special evacuation operation on 11 October 1993, and at the risk of their own lives, they rescued 7643 Georgians with 17 helicopters and 291 flights. At the same time, many Georgians were also brought out by ships. Kote Lashkhia was among them. The saved child was sheltered by a Ukrainian family in Odesa and after a few months he was returned to his family that meanwhile made it to safety to Tbilisi.

In 2014, when Russia began its military aggression against Ukraine, Kote returned to Ukraine. Shortly before his death he said:

Ukraine gave me and my mother another chance and now my life belongs to her. I am Georgian, but Ukraine is my second homeland. Now it is my sacred duty to protect him.

Kote Lashkhia died in Mariupol in July 2015. He was posthumously awarded the Medal for "Sacrifice and Love of Ukraine".
