= Kyiv Airport (disambiguation) =

Kyiv Airport may refer to:

- Boryspil International Airport, the main airport serving Kyiv, Ukraine
- Kyiv International Airport, a secondary airport serving Kyiv, Ukraine
- Hostomel Airport, an airport used for freight at Kyiv, Ukraine
