= Denys Kireyev =

Ukrainian banker and intelligence officer (1977–2022)

Denys Kireyev (Ukrainian: Денис Борисович Кірєєв; 1 January 1977 – 5 March 2022) was a Ukrainian banker and intelligence officer.

On 23 February 2022, Kireyev obtained information that Antonov Airport would be the site of the main attack of the 2022 Russian invasion of Ukraine, which allowed Ukraine to repel the initial assault on the airport and damage it heavily enough that it could not be used by Russia. Following the invasion on 24 February, he joined the 28 February peace negotiations in Gomel, Belarus. He was killed a week later by the Security Service of Ukraine (SBU). Kireyev was supposed to participate in the next round of peace talks in Belarus on March 3.

According to Kyrylo Budanov, chief of the Main Directorate of Intelligence of the Ministry of Defense of Ukraine (GUR), if it was not for the information given by Kireyev, Kyiv would have probably fallen.

== Banking career ==
In 2010–2014, he was First Deputy Chairman of the Board of Oschadbank, and prior to that he was a member of the supervisory board of Ukreximbank. He also worked for Citibank, Credit Lyonnais, ING Group, and Rabobank.

== Death ==
Kireyev died on 5 March 2022. According to preliminary reports in Russian and Ukrainian media, he was suspected of working as a double agent for Russia and was killed by the Security Service of Ukraine (SBU) that waited for him under his house and dispatched him with a shot to his head. According to these reports, he was suspected of treason, and the SBU held records of telephone conversations as evidence. The Ukrainian Ministry of Defence's Directorate of Intelligence subsequently confirmed Kireyev's death in a Facebook post, but asserted that he was an intelligence operative for Ukraine who died in the line of duty on a "special mission."

On 18 January 2023, Chief of the Main Directorate of Intelligence of Ukraine (GUR) Kyrylo Budanov stated that Kireyev was the one who, on 23 February 2022, warned the GUR of the Russian invasion of Ukraine. Ukrainian intelligence agencies decided to use Kireyev to obtain timely information during the Russian military buildup in September 2021 under the guise of military exercises Zapad 2021. The security forces took him to Kharkiv, from where he and another intelligence officer would enter the Russian Federation, and a few days later he would return and report to the GUR leadership. Thus, Kireyev warned the Ukrainian leadership about the Russian leadership's plans to attack Kyiv in January-February 2022, and a few hours before the Russian invasion, he described in detail the main location of the attack on the Antonov Airport in Hostomel. This intelligence provided several hours for the deployment of some amount of Ukrainian troops and helped to defend Kyiv at the beginning of the invasion. Budanov said that Kyiv most likely would have been occupied if not for Kireyev.

In January 2023, Zelenskyy's advisor Mykhailo Podolyak said that killing Kireyev by the SBU while he was in their custody was a tragic mistake possibly due to "poor coordination" between the GUR and the SBU.
