= Mamuka Mamulashvili =

Georgian military commander, co-founder of the Georgian Legion in Ukraine

Mamuka Mamulashvili მამუკა მამულაშვილი Мамука Мамулашвілі
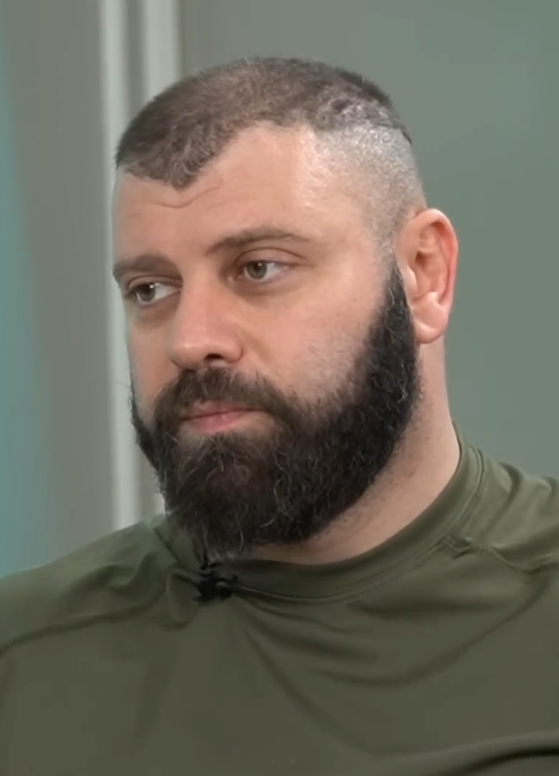
- Mamulashvili in 2023
- Born: Mamuka Zurabis dze Mamulashvili (მამუკა ზურაბის ძე მამულაშვილი); 22 April 1978 (age 48); Tbilisi, Georgian SSR, Soviet Union
- Military career
- Allegiance: Georgia (1993, 2008); Chechen Republic of Ichkeria (1994–1996); Ukraine (2014–present)
- Branch: Georgian Land Forces (1993, 2008); Ukrainian Ground Forces (2016–present)
- Service years: 1993–1996; 2008; 2016–present
- Rank: Commander
- Nicknames: Heroi (Герой, lit. 'Hero')
- Commands: Georgian Legion
- Conflicts: War in Abkhazia (1992–1993); First Chechen War; Russo-Georgian War; Russo-Ukrainian War; War in Donbas; Russian invasion of Ukraine; Kyiv offensive; Battle of Hostomel Airport

Mamuka "Ushangi" Mamulashvili (Georgian: მამუკა (უშანგი) მამულაშვილი; Ukrainian: Мамука Мамулашвілі; born 22 April 1978) is a Georgian military unit leader who currently commands the Georgian Legion in Ukraine.

== Biography ==
=== Early life ===
Mamuka Mamulashvili was born on 22 April 1978 in Tbilisi, the capital of the then Georgian Soviet Socialist Republic in the Soviet Union. His father, Zurab Mamulashvili, was a military commander during the 1992–1993 War in Abkhazia. His sister, Nona Mamulashvili, is a politician and deputy of Parliament of Georgia. He is a member of the United National Movement party of former Georgian President Mikheil Saakashvili.

=== War in Abkhazia ===
Mamulashvili fought for Georgia in the War in Abkhazia (1992–1993) when he was 14, alongside his father who was a Georgian military officer. Mamulashvili later recalled, "My first war was in the 1990s, in Abkhazia." During the war he was captured by Abkhaz forces and held for three months before being released.

=== First Chechen War ===
Mamulashvili fought as a foreign volunteer against Russian forces in the First Chechen War (1994–1996).

=== Return to Georgia ===
After the First Chechen War, Mamulashvili traveled to Paris to finish his education. He then returned to Georgia and served as a senior military advisor to Georgian President Mikheil Saakashvili.

Mamulashvili fought for Georgia in the Russo-Georgian War of 2008.

=== Ukraine ===
Mamulashvili moved to Ukraine in 2013 in order to support the Euromaidan.

==== Georgian Legion ====
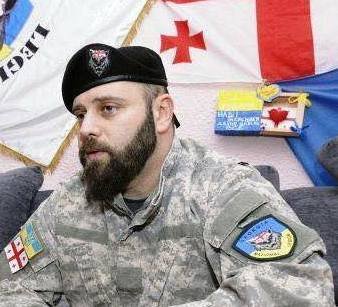
Mamulashvili in 2014

In 2014, Mamulashvili was one of the founding members of the Ukrainian Georgian Legion and is currently leading it against the 2022 Russian invasion. He took part in the Battle of Hostomel Airport.

Mamulashvili supports a no-fly zone to be placed over Ukraine, which he says is necessary to prevent Russian airstrikes.

There have been allegations of war crimes under his command, as part of the mis-treatment of prisoners of war in the Russian invasion of Ukraine, which were seemingly confirmed by Mamuka, only for the commander to deny them later on. In an interview published by the YouTube channel of the dissident Russian businessman Mikhail Khodorkovsky, he said about the treatment of Russian prisoners: "Sometimes we tie them hands and feet. I speak for the Georgian Legion, we will never take Russian prisoners." Mamulashvili justified no quarter for Russian soldiers as a response to the Bucha massacre.

On June 13, 2024, Mamulashvili reported that he's been poisoned for the third time.

==== Criminal charges in Russia ====
As of September 2023, eight criminal cases have been initiated against Mamulashvili in Russia. Charges against him include recruiting mercenary fighters, inciting ethnic hatred and other. Mamulashvili alleged that Russia has also placed a bounty on him.

=== Coup plot accusation in Georgia ===
On September 18, 2023, the State Security Service of Georgia (SSG) accused Saakashvili and his followers of plotting with the Ukrainian government and Georgian volunteers in Ukraine of planning a coup d'état against the Georgian government, via organizing of mass antigovernment protests. Mamulashvili responded saying the development seemed to be orchestrated by the Kremlin, and that the "baseless" accusation demonstrated that the ruling party in Georgia was being supported by the Kremlin. Kyiv demanded that Saakashvili be taken to a neutral country's clinic, citing he wasn't safe in Georgian authorities' care.

=== Coup plot accusation in Slovakia ===
On 31 January 2025, the prime minister of Slovakia Robert Fico together with Slovak Information Service accused the Georgian Legion of organising anti-government demonstrations with the goal of coup d'état in the country. At the press conference, Fico showed photographs of Mamulashvili with protest-organising group Mier Ukrajine (Peace to Ukraine) activist Lucia Štasselová and online news commentator Martin M. Šimečka, the father of opposition leader Michal Šimečka. Due to these accusations, Mamulashvili and 9 other people have been banned from entering the territory of Slovakia.

== Awards ==
- 3rd degree Order of Vakhtang Gorgasali (1992)
- Order of the People's Hero of Ukraine
- Order for Courage
- Cross of Ivan Mazepa
- Medal "For Sacrifice and Love for Ukraine"

== See also ==
- Georgian Legion (Ukraine)
