= 54th Mechanized Brigade =

Ukrainian Ground Forces unit

- 54-та окрема механізована бригада імені гетьмана Івана Мазепи
- Brigade shoulder sleeve insignia
- Active: December 2014 – present
- Country: Ukraine
- Branch: Ukrainian Ground Forces
- Type: Mechanized Infantry
- Size: Brigade
- Part of: Operational Command East; 11th Army Corps
- Garrison/HQ: Bakhmut
- Patron: Ivan Mazepa
- Engagements: War in Donbas; Russian invasion of Ukraine
- Decorations: For Courage and Bravery

Insignia
- Subdued SSI

The 54th Mechanized Brigade named after Hetman Ivan Mazepa (Ukrainian: 54-та окрема механізована бригада імені гетьмана Івана Мазепи) is a brigade of the Ukrainian Ground Forces, part of Operational Command East. The brigade was based in Bakhmut and was formed in 2014. The brigade fought in the war in Donbas and the Russian invasion of Ukraine.

== History ==
=== War in Donbas (2014–2022) ===
Between 18 and 22 December 2016, the brigade fought in the Battle of Svitlodarsk. The fighting began with a pro-Russian separatist attack against the 54th's positions. The brigade counterattacked the separatist flank and captured new positions. During the fighting, nine of the brigade's soldiers were killed and 35 were wounded. Press reports at the time described the action as the bloodiest in the preceding five months.

The Georgian Legion fought in eastern Ukraine under the overall command of the 54th Mechanized Brigade. In December 2017, the Legion withdrew from the brigade citing the "incompetence" of the brigade's command after a costly operation conducted near Svitlodarsk on 16 December 2017. The 54th Mechanized Brigade denied that a "Georgian Legion" had ever existed among their ranks. In January 2018 the Legion's commander Mamulashvili said the Legion remained committed to the Ukrainian cause and had moved to another brigade. He added that the decision was not connected to a political conflict between Mikhail Saakashvili and President of Ukraine Petro Poroshenko.

On May 5, 2018, during a raid, a unit of the 25th Infantry Battalion of the brigade captured a separatist fighter from the 3rd Battalion of the 7th Motorized Rifle Brigade.

On June 15, 2018, the brigade returned from the Joint Forces Operation Zone, where they had fought for eight months on the Svitlodarsk Arc. During the rotation, 170 fighters of Russian-aligned groups and 19 pieces of materiel were neutralized, three enemy positions were destroyed, and two settlements were recaptured.

In mid-July 2019, the 54th Brigade conducted an operation in the Donbas, destroying a military base. The attack, which lasted only 12 minutes, destroyed valuable military equipment, killed 20 soldiers, and wounded 11.

On May 6, 2020, the brigade was given the honorary title of "Ivan Mazepa."

=== Russia-Ukraine war (2022–present) ===
During April 2022, units of the 54th Mechanized Brigade, including the K2 Battalion, took part in combat operations in the Donetsk Oblast.; the K2 Battalion continued operating in the Donetsk Oblast during May 2022. By August 2022, the K2 Battalion was taking part in the defense of Marinka in the Donetsk Oblast.

In September 2022, the brigade took part in an operation to recapture the village of Spirne in the Donetsk Oblast as part of a a major Ukrainian offensive.

On December 6, 2022, the brigade was awarded the medal "For Courage and Bravery" by presidential decree.

As of May 2023, the 54th Brigade's K2 Battalion was operating on the "Soledar-Siversk front".

In March 2024, mechanized elements of the 54th Brigade reportedly took part in combat near the village of Orlianka, in the Kharkiv Oblast.

During May 2024 and July 2024, the brigade's K2 Battalion was involved in combat on the Siversk front, in the area of the village of Verkhn'okam'yans'ke. By July 2024, it was reported that this battalion had held positions on the Siversk front for more than a year.

As of November 2024, units of the 54th Brigade were operating on the Siversk front under the command of the Luhansk Operational-Tactical Group.

As of March 2025, the K2 Battalion was still taking part in combat on the Siversk front, including at the village of Verkhn'okam'yans'ke. As of February 2025, the 54th Brigade's "Incognito Battalion" was also operating in the Donetsk Oblast.

On December 27, 2025, Ukrainska Pravda reported that the brigade commander, Colonel Oleksii Konoval, was removed from his post following the fall of Siversk. According to the publication, the brigade command falsified reports about holding positions that were in fact empty.

== Structure ==
As of 2024, the brigade's structure is as follows:

- 54th Mechanized Brigade, Bakhmut
  - Headquarters & Headquarters Company
  - 1st Mechanized Battalion
    - Attack UAV Unit "Legion"
  - 2nd Mechanized Battalion "K-2"
    - Attack UAV Platoon
  - 3rd Mechanized Battalion
  - 25th Separate Motorized Battalion "Kyivan Rus" (unit number А2457)
  - 1st Rifle Battalion
  - 2nd Rifle Battalion
  - Tank Battalion "Zvirobiy"
  - 46th Separate Assault Battalion "Donbas"
  - Field Artillery Regiment
    - Headquarters & Target Acquisition Battery
    - 1st Self-propelled Artillery Battalion (2S3 Akatsiya)
    - 2nd Self-propelled Artillery Battalion (2S1 Gvozdika)
    - Rocket Artillery Battalion (BM-21 Grad)
    - Anti-tank Artillery Battalion (MT-12 Rapira)
  - Anti-Aircraft Missile Artillery Battalion
  - Special Purpose Reconnaissance Company "Incognito"
  - Aerial reconnaissance Drone Unit "Ministry of Magic"
  - Attack UAV Company "Divine Punishment" ("Nebesna Kara")
  - Sniper Company
  - Engineer Battalion
  - Maintenance Battalion
  - Logistic Battalion
  - Electronic Warfare Company
  - Signal Company
  - Radar Company
  - Chemical, Biological, Radiological and Nuclear Defense Company
  - Medical Company
