= 25th Mechanized Infantry Battalion (Ukraine) =

25th Independent Motorized Infantry Battalion
- 25-й окремий мотопіхотний батальйон
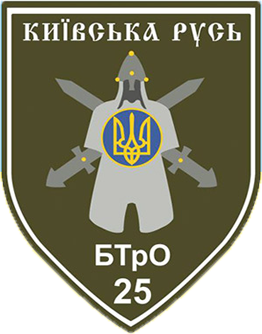
- Active: 2014 -
- Country: Ukraine
- Branch: Ukrainian Ground Forces
- Type: Motorized infantry
- Size: Battalion
- Part of: 54th Mechanized Brigade

The 25th Independent Motorized Infantry Battalion is an motorized infantry battalion of the Ukrainian Ground Forces.

== History ==
Created on June 4 2014 in Kyiv as the 25th territorial defence battalion «Kievan Rus'».

On 21 October 2014, the 25th territorial defence battalion was reorganized into the 25th independent motorized infantry battalion of the Ukrainian Ground Forces. In September 2015, battalion was assigned to the 54th Mechanized Brigade.

From August 20 to December 2014, the battalion held positions on the front line of the ATO in sector "C" in Debaltseve.

On February 24 2016, the Georgian Legion was consolidated as the 3rd Company of the 25th Battalion. However, on January 06 2018, the 54th Brigade Command reported that there was never a separate unit called the Georgian Legion as part of the 54th Brigade.

On August 6, 2015, one soldier of the battalion was released from captivity by the "DPR".

From November 2021, they ware stationed in Malinka, Donetsk Oblast.
