= Battle of Antonov Airport =

Part of the Russian invasion of Ukraine

- Part of the Northern front during the 2022 Russian invasion of Ukraine
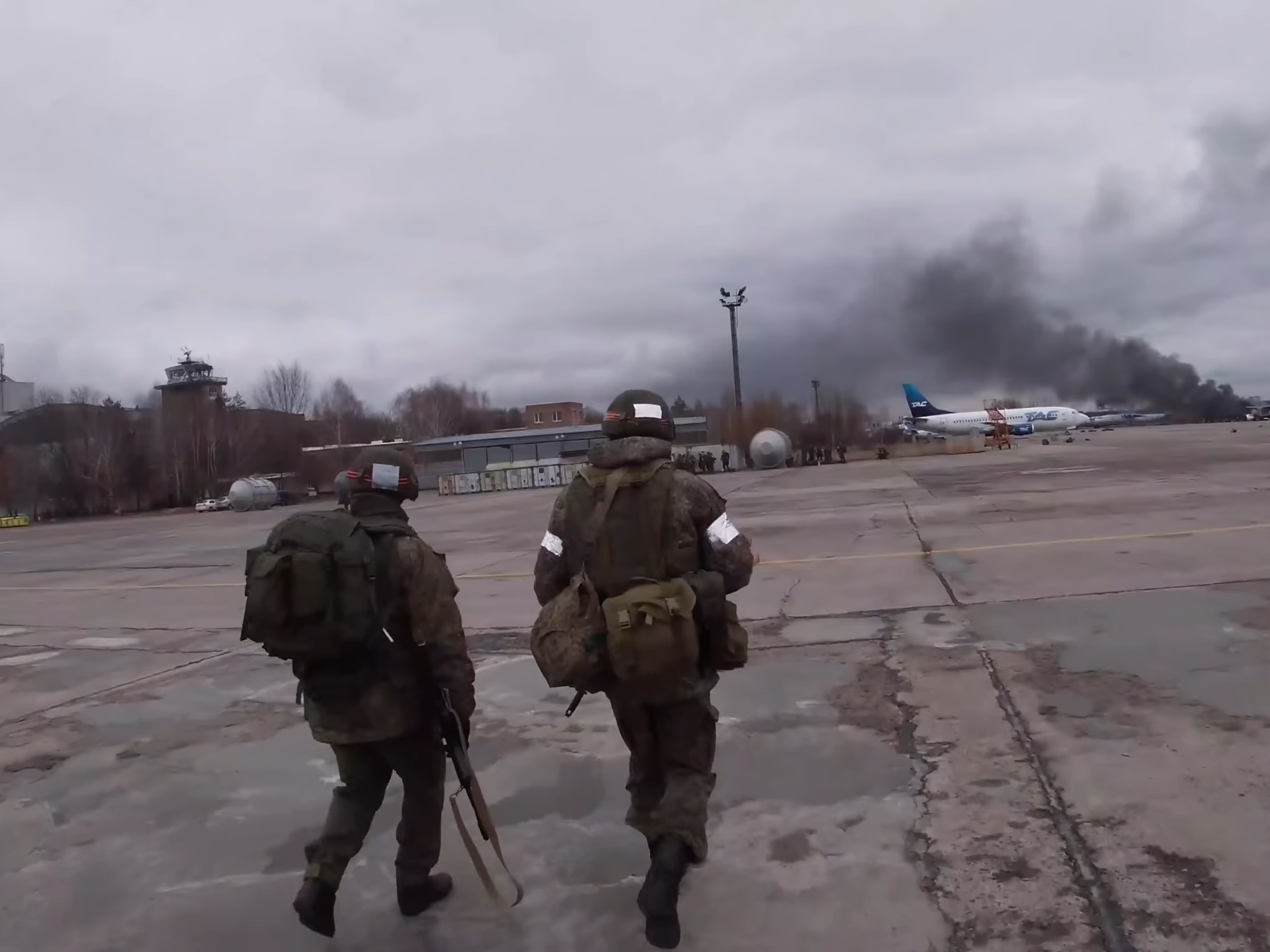
- Russian paratroopers at Antonov Airport, 12 March 2022
Date	24–25 February 2022 (1 day)
Location	Hostomel, Kyiv Oblast, Ukraine 50°35′27″N 30°12′27″E
Result	See § Analysis
Territorial changes	Occupation of Antonov Airport by Russia until 2 April 2022

Belligerents
Russia	Ukraine

Commanders and leaders
Ivan Boldyrev	Oleksandr Vdovychenko; Valeriy Chybineyev; Mamuka Mamulashvili; Vitaly Rudenko

Units involved
See order of battle	See order of battle

Strength
First assault wave: 20–34 helicopters; Numerous Mi-8s; Several Ka-52s; 700 airborne troops; At least two Su-25s; Second assault wave: 200 helicopters (per Russia); Numerous tanks and armored vehicles; Unknown number of ground troops	300 in the airport garrison; Unknown number of ground troops, tanks, and armored vehicles as reinforcements; Several BM-21 (per Russia); At least two Su-24s; Several MiG-29s; At least two Mi-24s

Casualties and losses
Per Russia: None (second assault wave); Per Ukraine: 300–500 paratroopers killed Several helicopters shot down	Per Russia: 200 killed Per Ukraine: Several Ukrainian National Guardsmen captured Antonov An-225 Mriya destroyed
- Location within Ukraine

The Battle of Antonov Airport, also known as the Battle of Hostomel Airport, was a military engagement which occurred at Antonov Airport in Hostomel, Kyiv Oblast, during the Kyiv offensive of the Russian invasion of Ukraine.

On 24 February 2022, a few hours after the president of Russia, Vladimir Putin announced the beginning of a "special military operation" in Ukraine, Russian troops of the Russian Airborne Forces (VDV) made an air assault on Antonov Airport with the objective of capturing it. The airport held strategic value as it was located less than 10 kilometres (6.2 mi) outside of the capital Kyiv, which would allow Russian troops to airlift more troops and heavier equipment to directly threaten the city. However, the Ukrainian military responded with a counter-attack which encircled the unsupported Russian forces and repelled the initial assault. The attack resumed on the next day with another air assault by the VDV combined with a ground assault by armored reinforcements coming from the Belarusian border, breaking through the Ukrainian defenses. The airport was then captured by the Russian forces.

Despite this, the unexpected Ukrainian resistance foiled the plans for a quick capture of Kyiv, and the airport was too damaged to be used as a functional airstrip. The Antonov An-225 Mriya, the world's heaviest airplane, was destroyed in its hangar during the battle.

On 2 April, Ukraine restored control of the airport following the Russian withdrawal from Kyiv Oblast.

== Background ==
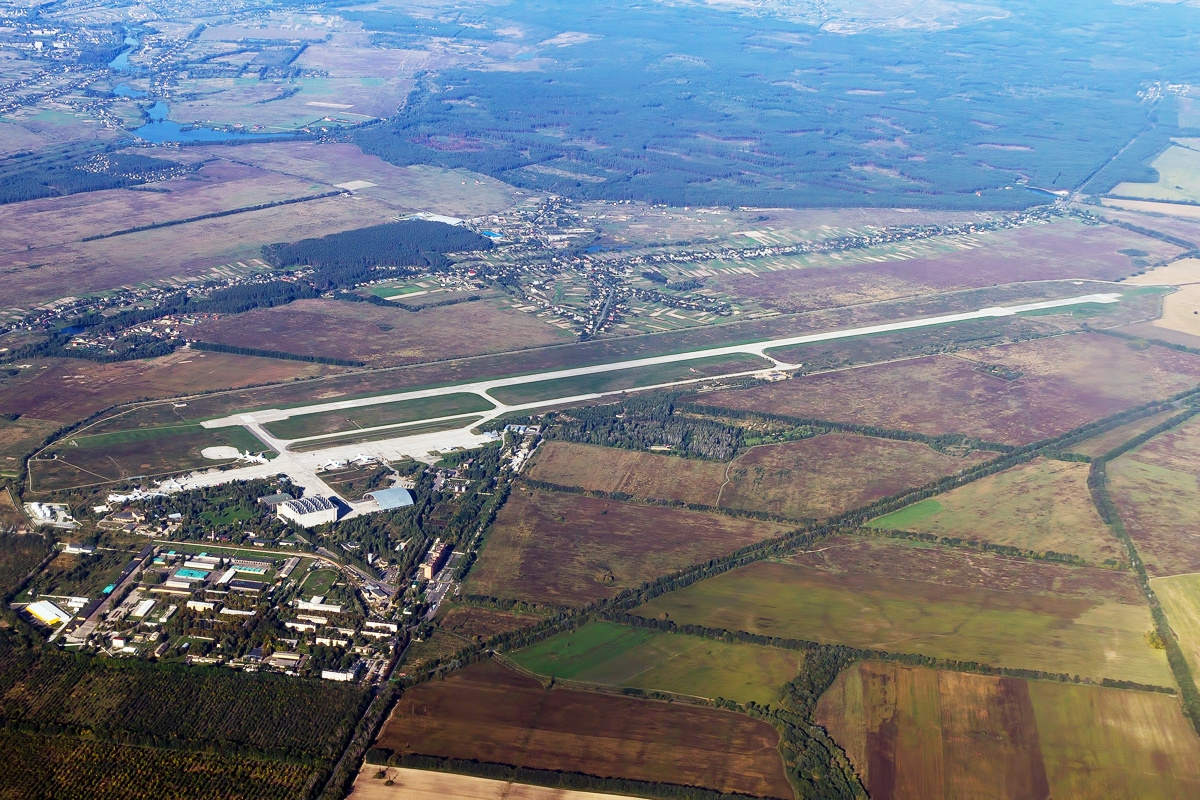
Antonov Airport in 2012

Antonov Airport, or the Hostomel Airport, is a major international cargo airport located in the town of Hostomel, on the northwestern outskirts of the capital of Ukraine, Kyiv. It was formerly a Soviet air base and has a 3,500 meter runway. The airport was owned and operated by the Antonov State Enterprise, the Ukrainian state-owned aerospace and air defense company. The airport hosted the only Antonov An-225 Mriya, the world's largest airplane. The airport is strategically significant due to its ability to receive heavy transport aircraft and its closeness to Kyiv as well as European route E373.

As Hostomel is located just outside Kyiv, around 10 kilometres (6.2 mi) away, and could give quick access to the capital, it was strategically important. In the time leading up to the Russian invasion of Ukraine, the United States Central Intelligence Agency (CIA) obtained detailed information about Russian attack plans. CIA director William J. Burns travelled to Ukraine in January 2022, and informed the Ukrainian leadership that Russia intended to capture Antonov Airport for an airbridge, which would allow Russian forces to quickly move into Kyiv to "decapitate the government". According to Kyrylo Budanov, Chief of Ukraine's Main Directorate of Intelligence, banker Denys Kireyev obtained information on 23 February 2022 from Russian sources that the Russian invasion of Ukraine would begin on 24 February and that Antonov Airport would be the site of the main attack of the invasion. Analysts believed that President of Russia Vladimir Putin and the rest of the Russian leadership assumed that such a quick operation would throw Ukraine into disarray, resulting in the collapse of the Ukrainian military and allowing Russia to install a puppet government. Madison Policy Forum analyst John Spencer argued that this would have secured a military victory for Russia, albeit probably producing a massive Ukrainian insurgency.

The warnings by the CIA and Kireyev helped the Ukrainian military to prepare for an attack on Antonov Airport. Conversely, the Ukrainians did not expect a large-scale airborne assault on Antonov Airport, instead assuming that the Russians would send a small group of special forces with helicopters in the case of an invasion. As a result, the airport only held a small garrison of 200–300 National Guard troops belonging to the 4th Rapid Reaction Brigade, as the remainder had been moved to the frontline in eastern Ukraine. These troops were mostly conscripts, though there were a "handful" of professional contract soldiers; aside from a few BTRs, at least one ZU-23-2 gun, and a few 9K38 Igla man-portable air-defense systems (MANPADS), the garrison was lightly equipped. The setup of defenses at the airport and its garrisoning was hindered by the Antonov State Enterprise whose leadership initially blocked the entry of National Guard troops. The Ukrainian military was only able to fully garrison the airport on 23 February, one day before the Russian invasion.

== Battle ==
=== 24 February 2022 ===
A Russian Ка-52 helicopter attacking during the battle

On 24 February 2022, around 05:30 am local time, President Putin announced a "special military operation" to "demilitarise and denazify" Ukraine. Between 6:00 and 7:00 a.m., four Kalibr missiles targeted the airport and the nearby National Guard base, though none did significant damage to the Ukrainian defenses. Meanwhile, a formation of 20 to 34 Russian helicopters launched the operation to secure Antonov Airport to create an airbridge in which troops and equipment could muster less than 10 kilometres (6.2 mi) from Kyiv. Starting at VD Bolshoy Bokov Airport in Belarus at about 9:30, the helicopter formation consisted of Mi-8s carrying about 200–300 Russian airborne troops escorted by Ka-52 and Mi-24 attack helicopters. The paratroopers belonged to the 31st Guards Air Assault Brigade, the 45th Guards Spetsnaz Brigade, and possibly the 11th Guards Air Assault Brigade.

To cover their attack on Antonov Airport, the Russian military jammed Ukrainian radars and suppressed local air defense sites. The air assault was captured on video by both civilians and soldiers. Flying low, the Russian helicopters made their approach from the Dnieper River and were immediately attacked by Ukrainian small arms fire and MANPADS. The Russian helicopters countered by deploying flares. Several Mi-8s were recorded being hit. Five Mikoyan MiG-29s of the Ukrainian 40th Tactical Aviation Brigade also intercepted the formation, reportedly shooting down at least two more helicopters and harassing the Russian aircraft intended to support the landing. Overall, two helicopters were confirmed to have been shot down, including one Ka-52 whose two pilots ejected. As the Russian formation approached Hostomel, it was hidden by a thick, low cloud cover, meaning that the airport garrison only discovered them when hearing their rotor blades. However, the local soldiers had been warned due to the previous bombardment by Kalibr missiles, and had taken up defensive positions and manned the ZU-23 anti-aircraft gun at the airport's northern end.

Upon arriving at Hostomel at around 11:00, the Russian helicopters prepared the airborne landing by attacking the airport with rockets. Some Ukrainian air defenses at the airport were hit and destroyed during this initial attack; Ukrainian officials later concluded that an airport employee had been hired by Russian intelligence to reveal these positions. (Note: In March, Ukraine ordered the detainment of three former top managers of Antonov State Enterprise, including Sergiy Bychkov. They were charged with "obstructing the lawful activities of the Armed Forces of Ukraine and other military formations in protecting and defending the airport".) Though the rocket bombardment screened the landings, it failed to significantly weaken the Ukrainian defenses around the airport. Once disembarked, the Russian airborne units began to capture the airport. The roughly 300 Ukrainian defenders were not well equipped, and included many draftees who had never seen combat. They could only offer limited resistance, though one national guardsman, Serhiy Falatyuk, shot down a Russian helicopter with an 9K38 Igla, reportedly "boosting the spirits" of the conscripts. As fighting intensified, the Ukrainian air defenses became more effective. The helicopter of Russian commander Capt. Ivan Boldyrev was hit and forced to make an emergency landing. Furthermore, the initial wave of paratroopers landed at an exposed area, allowing the Ukrainian troops to easily target them.

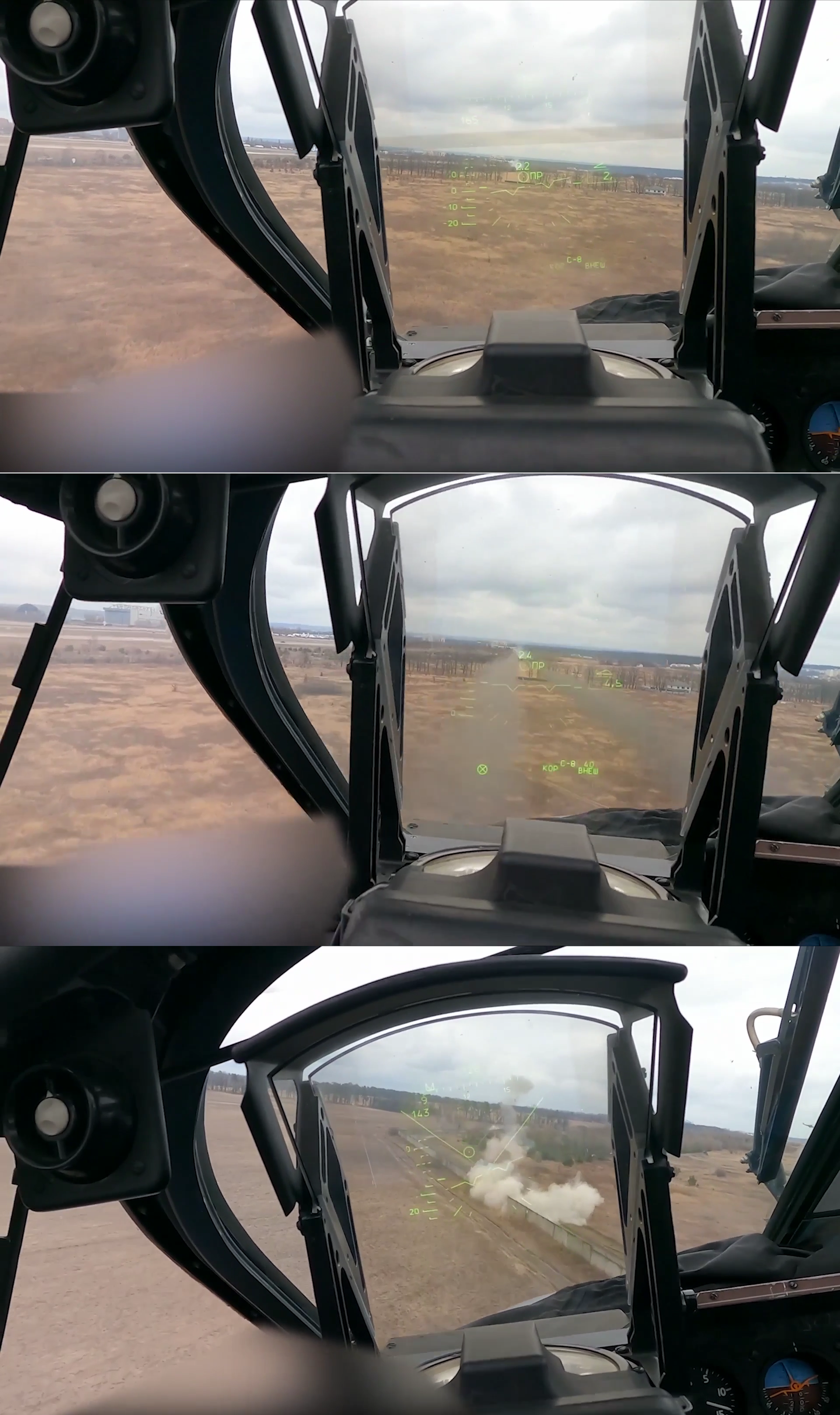
Cockpit view inside a Russian Ka-52 attack helicopter conducting a low flying sortie over Antonov Airport on 24 February

As the Russian paratroopers landed in growing numbers and fanned out, the Ukrainian garrison was forced to retreat as they started to run out of ammunition. The initial clash had lasted about an hour; while the paratroopers had suffered significant losses, none of the National Guard defenders had been killed, according to one soldier interviewed later. However, the group of soldiers at the northern ZU-23 anti-aircraft gun was captured by the Russians. The Russian forces were thus able to secure the airport. British CNN reporter Matthew Chance caught on camera up close Russian soldiers securing the perimeter of the Airport and he attempted to get some commentary from them. This success was due to the Ukrainian military being taken by surprise by the speed of the Russian attack, despite the preparations made after the CIA's warning. The paratroopers then began preparing for the arrival of 18 Ilyushin Il-76 strategic airlifters carrying fresh troops from Russia.

Despite overcoming the initial Ukrainian resistance, the paratroops continued to be engaged by local armed civilians and the 3rd Special Purpose Regiment. The Ukrainians also began to bombard the airport with heavy artillery. Ukrainian Gen. Valery Zaluzhny recognized the danger of the Russian bridgehead at Hostomel, and ordered the 72nd Mechanized Brigade under Col. Oleksandr Vdovychenko to organize a counter-attack. At the "critical moment" of the battle, a large Ukrainian counterattack was launched by the 4th Rapid Reaction Brigade, backed by the Ukrainian Air Force. Lacking armored vehicles, the Russian forces were dependent on air support to stave off the Ukrainian advances. Two Russian Su-25s were witnessed attacking Ukrainian positions. Ukrainian warplanes which survived the opening Russian missile strikes took part in providing air support for the National Guard units; these included at least two Su-24s and a MiG-29. The Ukrainians were swift in rushing more troops to the airport to support the counter-attack. These reinforcements included the Georgian Legion, and a unit of the Ukrainian Air Assault Forces. The Russian Il-76s carrying reinforcements could not land; they were possibly forced to return to Russia.

Ukrainian military units surrounded the airport and pushed back the Russian forces by the evening, forcing remaining Russian airborne troops to retreat to forests outside of the airport. Georgian Legion commander Mamuka Mamulashvili later claimed that his men ran out of ammunition in the battle, whereupon he used his car to run over retreating Russian paratroopers. Later, the 4th Rapid Reaction Brigade posted on their Facebook page an image of their soldiers celebrating the victory, while holding a Ukrainian flag riddled with bullet holes.

The unique Antonov An-225 Mriya, the world's largest airplane, was at the airport at the start of the battle. It was initially confirmed to be intact by an Antonov pilot, despite the fighting. On 27 February, a Ukroboronprom press release claimed that the Mriya had been destroyed by a Russian airstrike. On 4 March, Russian state-owned television channel Channel One Russia aired footage showing that the Mriya had been destroyed.

=== 25 February 2022 ===
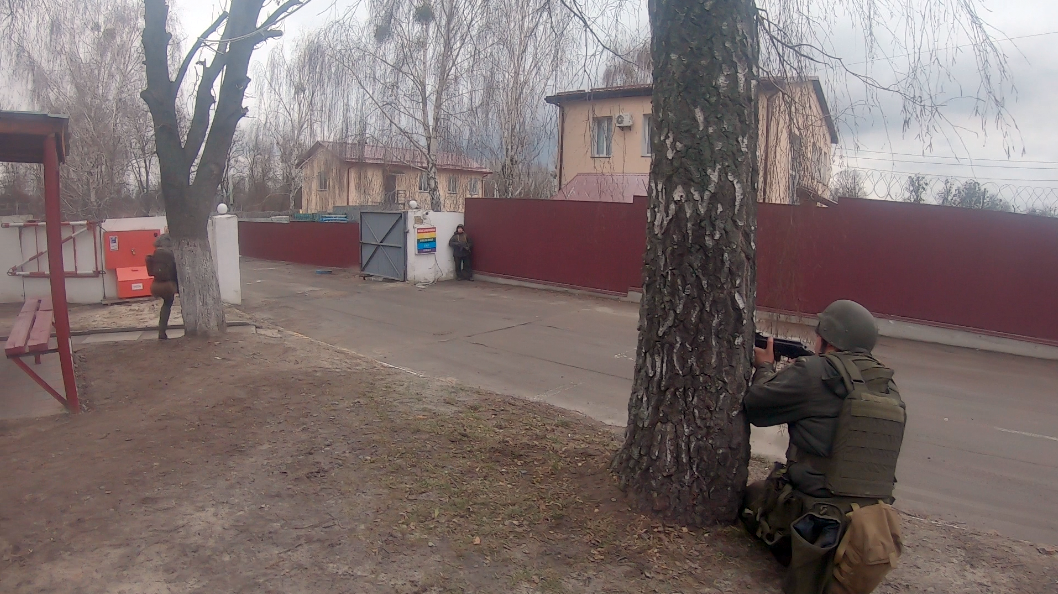
Ukrainian National Guard troops cover the exit of airport personnel and civil servants.

On 25 February 2022, Russian mechanized ground forces advancing from Belarus combined with another air assault by the VDV, took control of the airport after partially breaking through Ukrainian defenses in Ivankiv. Some of the armored vehicles were ambushed before reaching Hostomel, halting the reinforcements for a time, but nonetheless they entered the airport and helped to expel the Ukrainian defenders. According to the Russian Ministry of Defence, the capture came following an operation that involved some 200 helicopters. The Russian defence ministry announced the figure of about 200 Ukrainian casualties and no casualties on the Russian side. This claim was met with skepticism, with Timur Olevsky, a journalist who witnessed the battle, outright rebutting this claim. Nevertheless, Russian ground forces established a foothold in Hostomel and began to man checkpoints inside the town. It was speculated that the Ukrainian defenders may have sabotaged the runway ahead of the advancing Russian ground forces.

The Ukrainian Ministry of Internal Affairs initially denied that the airport had been fully captured by the Russian forces, stating that it had been "changing hands" and that the battle was ongoing. The Ministry of Internal Affairs also insisted that the Russian claim of massive Ukrainian casualties was "an absolute lie", while the Ukrainian Ministry of Defence declared that the airfield was too badly damaged to be used by Russian troops. Later in the day, Ukraine confirmed that Russian forces were in control of the airport.

== Analysis ==
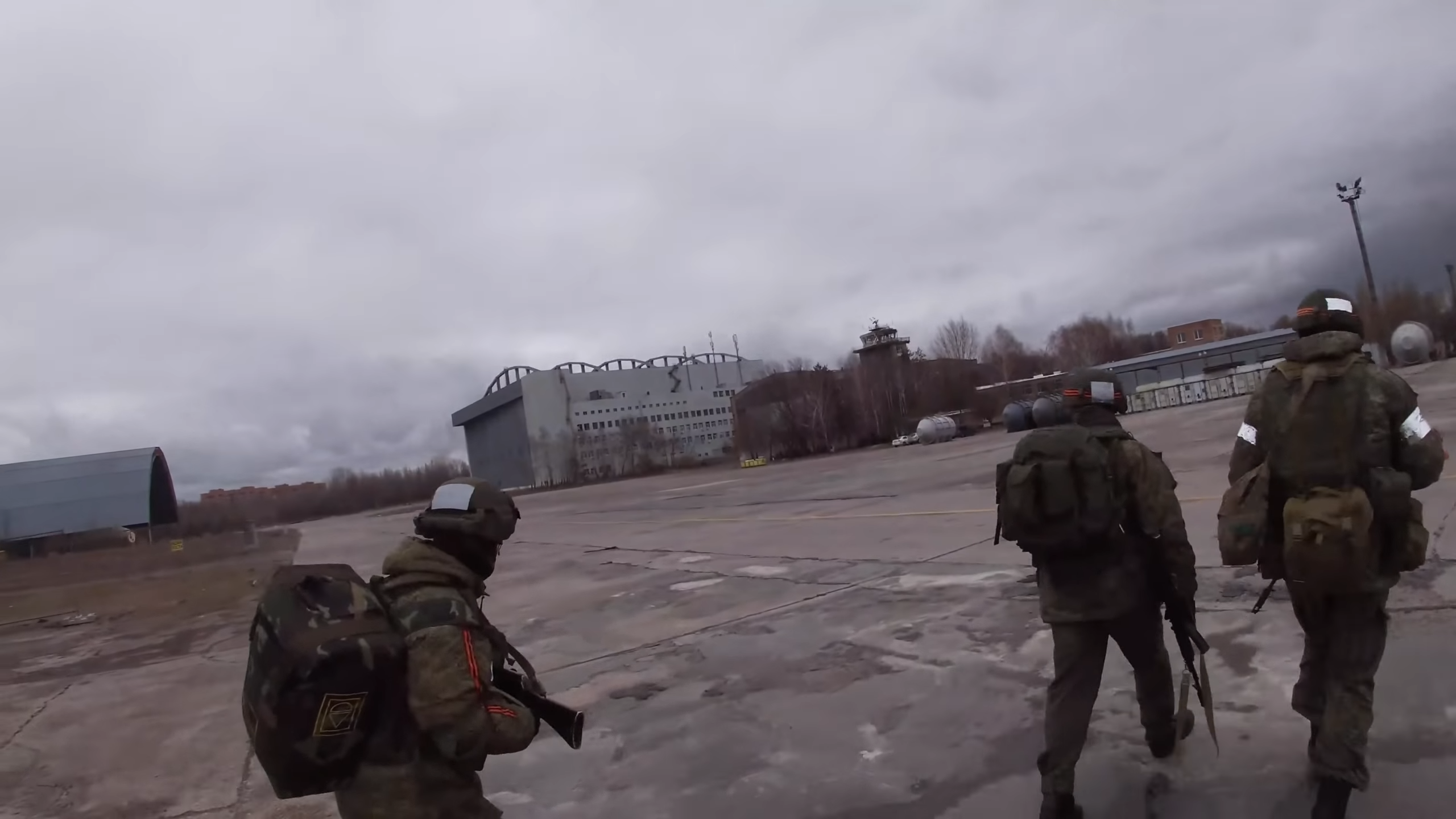
Russian airborne troops advance past a hangar containing the Antonov An-225 Mriya at Antonov Airport

Security analyst Andrew McGregor described the battle for Antonov Airport as "Russian Airborne Disaster". According to him, the initial Russian operation had aimed at securing an early access for the invasion forces into Kyiv to end the entire war within a day or two. Instead, Russian intelligence had failed to assess the actual concentration of Ukrainian defenders around the airport, and assumed only token defenses. As the initial landing force was too small to hold the locality, while the Russian military was unable to secure air transport for reinforcements as well as prevent Ukrainian counter-attacks, this led to the destruction of the first landing force. McGregor argued that the failure to take Antonov Airport and another airport at Vasylkiv at the invasion's start ended Russia's chance to bring the conflict to swift conclusion.

Researchers of the Atlantic Council also argued that Ukraine's ability to defend the airport for two days "possibly prevent[ed] a rapid capture" of Kyiv by Russia. Michael Shoebridge of the Australian Strategic Policy Institute argued that "the rapid strike was meant to paralyse the central government and demoralise the Ukrainian forces", but that this operation failed. Royal United Services Institute associate director Jonathan Eyal described the initial Russian failure to take the airport as "a turning point" in the war. Journalist Patrick J. McDonnell stated that "Russia lost the battle for Kyiv with its hasty assault" on the airport. Agence France-Presse stated that "On the doorstep of Kyiv, Gostomel Airport was where Russia hoped to stage a decisive victory over Ukraine. [...] It was in Gostomel and the surrounding Kyiv suburbs where Russia's advance from the north faltered then failed." Researchers Stijn Mitzer and Joost Oliemans argued that the operation failed not just because of the initial Ukrainian defense at the airport, but also because of the Russian advance being stalled in the subsequent Battle of Hostomel. As a result, a large quantity of Russian troops and equipment was left waiting at Antonov Airport, subject to constant Ukrainian shelling. Mitzer and Oliemans expressed the belief that the battles for the airport and city of Hostomel "broke the back of the Russian assault on Kyiv". Researcher Severin Pleyer suggested that the Battle of Antonov Airport showcased the Russian military's general failures during the invasion, including difficulties with main weapon systems, failures in logistics, coordination, and planning, as well as a lack of leadership and training. According to him, the fighting for the airport also highlighted that the Russian battalion tactical groups are ill-suited for warfare, as they hinder coordination and communication.

Analysts at War on the Rocks recognized the Battle of Antonov Airport as the first major battle of the Russian invasion of Ukraine, and believed that the engagement was a decisive event in the war, in which Ukraine succeeded in preventing a rapid capture of Kyiv. Although Russian forces eventually captured the airport, Ukrainian resistance and their cratering of the runways managed to delay Russian airborne forces long enough to keep them from using it as an airbridge to support offensive operations in Kyiv. Russia's failure in achieving this strategic objective, in addition to their massive logistic traffic jams to the north of Kyiv, ended up collapsing their plans for executing a rapid decapitation attack on the Ukrainian government.

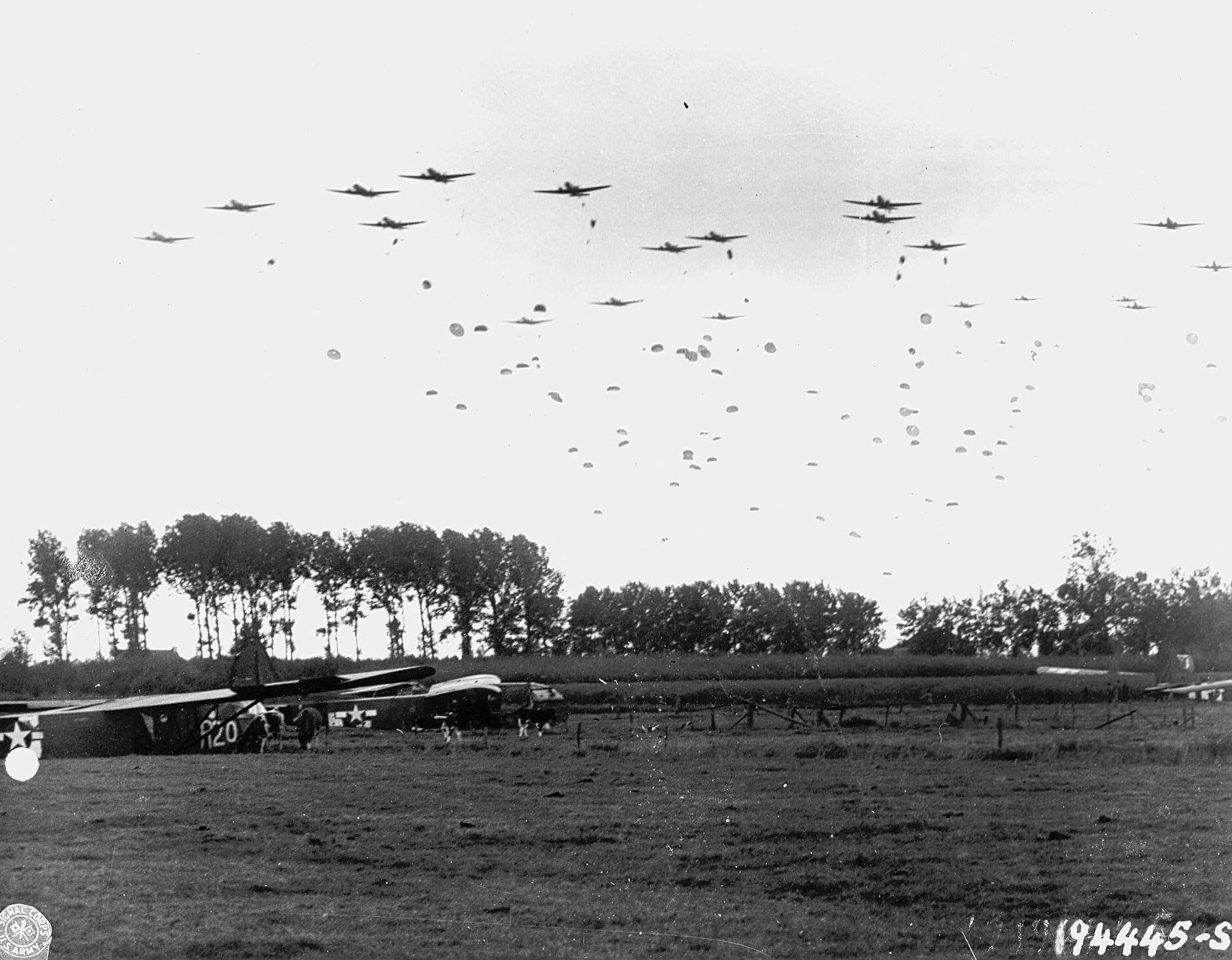
The course of the Battle of Antonov Airport was compared to World War II's Operation Market Garden (Allied paratroopers pictured).

Conversely, CNN described the airport's fall as "the first major victory notched by the Russians" in the invasion. The Washington Post also stated that "still, the Russians had their bridgehead" after capturing the airport on 24 February. Ukrainian commander Oleksandr Syrskyi later argued that the fall of the airport "played a negative role" for the Ukrainian forces, but that "artillery fire aimed at the runway and disembarkation sites delayed the landing significantly and frustrated the plan to capture Kyiv". Jeremy Kofsky, researcher of the United States Military Academy's Modern War Institute, compared the Battle of Antonov Airport to Operation Market Garden. He argued that in both engagements the initial paratrooper landing was successful and temporarily captured the target area, but mistakes in planning (particularly flawed assessments of the defenders' willingness and ability to resist) caused a paratrooper force to be overwhelmed. As a result, the attacking force was only able to seize the target at a later date when it had become much less strategically significant, resulting in major issues for the attackers' overall offensive strategy.

Journalist Andreas Rüesch also argued that the Battle of Antonov Airport, alongside other battles during the invasion, disproved the myth of the extreme capabilities and near-invincibility of the Russian Airborne Forces, claims which had been extensively fostered by propaganda in Russia. In reference to the first day of fighting, Pleyer described the battle as the worst defeat inflicted on the Russian Airborne Forces in recent history. Citing Ukrainian sources and a captured Russian paratrooper, The Moscow Times later reported that at least 60 soldiers from the 31st Guards Air Assault Brigade were killed during the battle for the airport. The New York Times reported that, according to "senior American and Ukrainian officials and the captured Russian logbook", about 300 Russian paratroopers were killed in the battle overall.

Several days after the airport's capture, Russian forces were able to partially restore its landing fields for aircraft to use, though the airport mainly came to serve as a hub to store equipment and house troops.

== Order of battle ==
=== Russia ===
Russian Armed Forces

- Russian Airborne Forces
  - 11th Guards Air Assault Brigade
  - 31st Guards Air Assault Brigade
  - 45th Guards Spetsnaz Brigade
- Russian Air Force

National Guard of Russia

- 141st Motorized Regiment ("Kadyrovites")

=== Ukraine ===
Armed Forces of Ukraine

- Ukrainian Air Force
  - 40th Tactical Aviation Brigade
- Ukrainian Air Assault Forces
- Ukrainian Ground Forces
  - 72nd Mechanized Brigade
  - Georgian Legion
- Special Operations Forces
  - 3rd Special Purpose Regiment

National Guard of Ukraine

- 4th Rapid Reaction Brigade

Irregular civilian volunteers (militia)

- Main Directorate of Intelligence (Ukraine)
  - Shaman Battalion

== Aftermath ==
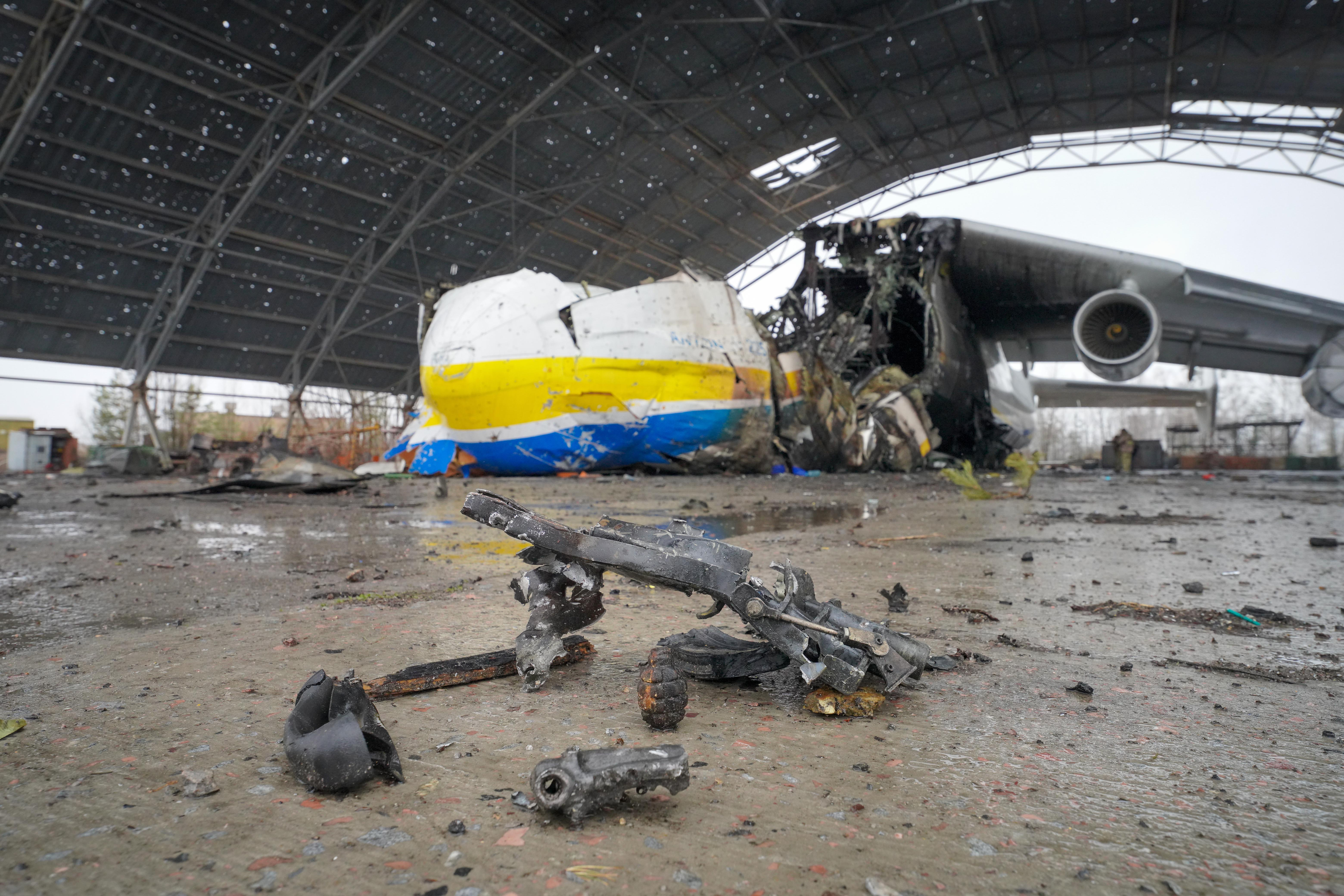
Remains of the Antonov An-225 Mriya

Despite the loss of the airport, Ukrainian forces continued to engage the Russian forces in Hostomel. Eyewitnesses recorded videos of allegedly a Russian tank column burning in the distance and Ukrainian Mi-24s firing rockets at Russian positions. Russian Defense Ministry spokesman Igor Konashenkov claimed that Ukrainian forces deployed BM-21 Grad in Kyiv to bombard Russian forces occupying the airport. Olevsky stated that he believes casualties for both Russian and Ukrainian may number in the hundreds.

On 26 February 2022, Ukrainian forces claimed that the Ukrainian Alpha Group unit destroyed a column of Russian armored vehicles near Hostomel. Sofiia Fedyna, a member of the Verkhovna Rada, alleged that Russian Spetsnaz captured some members of the Ukrainian National Guard and were wearing their uniforms. She asked Ukrainian citizens and fighters to speak only in Ukrainian to help identify Russian saboteurs.

As of 27 February 2022, the airport remained under Russian control as clashes began to shift to the towns of Bucha and Irpin to the south, where Ukrainian forces claimed to have halted the Russian advances, contesting Russian forces in Hostomel amid intense fighting. On 27 February, the Security Service of Ukraine released an alleged intercepted conversation of Russian forces in Hostomel reporting casualties and requesting to be evacuated. On the same day, Ukrainian forces bombarded the airport with artillery, and claimed to have destroyed Russian equipment, vehicles, and personnel. The next day, a Russian military convoy stretching 40 miles (64 km) arrived at the airport in preparation for an assault on Kyiv.

Over the next few weeks, the airport was partially repaired, but it was not put to use as an airstrip. The airport mainly served as a forward operating base, housing equipment and troops.

As of 28 March 2022, satellite imagery showed no Russian forces inside the airport. On 29 March, Russian Deputy Minister of Defense Alexander Fomin announced a withdrawal of Russian forces from the Kyiv area, including the abandonment of Hostomel Airport.

By 2 April, Ukrainian forces had regained control of the airport following a large-scale Russian withdrawal along the Kyiv axis. In their hasty retreat, Russian troops destroyed much of their own equipment, while other materiel was captured intact by the Ukrainians. In addition, other Russian equipment had been destroyed by Ukrainian artillery strikes before the withdrawal. Overall, Russia lost at least seven armoured fighting vehicles, 23 infantry fighting vehicles, three armoured personnel carriers, one anti-aircraft gun, two field artillery pieces, three helicopters, and 67 trucks, vehicles and jeeps at Antonov Airport.

== See also ==
- List of military engagements during the Russian invasion of Ukraine
- Tangail Airdrop (similar airborne operation conducted during the India-Pakistan War of 1971)
- Operation Cactus Lilly (air assault operation conducted during the India-Pakistan War of 1971)
- Jaffna University Helidrop (similar air assault operation conducted during the Sri Lankan Civil War)
- Battle of Ap Bac
