= Shaman Battalion =

Ukrainian military volunteer unit

- Батальйон «Шаман»
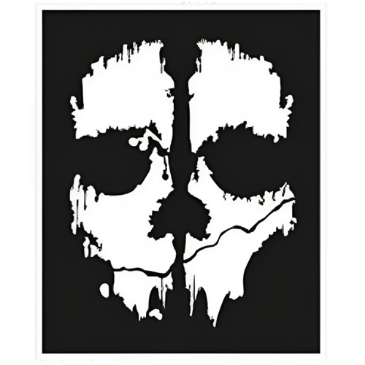
- Shaman insignia
- Founded: February 2022
- Country: Ukraine
- Branch: Main Directorate of Intelligence
- Type: Spetsnaz
- Role: Reconnaissance, counteroffensive and sabotage
- Engagements: Russo-Ukrainian War; Russian invasion of Ukraine; Northern Ukraine campaign; Battle of Antonov Airport; Battle of Hostomel; Battle of Kyiv; Battle of Bucha; Battle of Irpin; Eastern Ukraine campaign; Battle of Sievierodonetsk; Battle of Bakhmut; Southern Ukraine campaign; Dnieper campaign; Zaporizhzhia Nuclear Power Plant crisis; Snake Island campaign; Western Russia campaign; 2023 Belgorod Oblast incursions
- Website: https://www.shamanbat-gur.army

The 10th Special Forces "Shaman" Battalion is a Ukrainian military unit, part of the spetsnaz units of the Main Directorate of Intelligence of Ukraine formed in 2022 as a response to the Russian invasion of Ukraine.

Named for its secretive nature, the battalion was formed by veterans of the War in Donbass and the War in Afghanistan, it has successfully liberated several occupied villages during the fighting, later also taking part in counter offensives and sabotage operations, becoming one of the more high-profile special units in the war.

== History ==
The battalion was established on 23 February 2022 but the battalion commander, as well as many other personnel have been active in combat since 2014 during the War in Donbass, as well as fighting alongside American and British forces as part of ISAF during the War in Afghanistan and also participated in the withdrawal of allied forces during the Fall of Kabul.

The Battalion's first encounter with Russian troops took place during the Battle of Antonov Airport and the Battle of Hostomel.

The first fights were in civilian sneakers, a jacket, and a hat. [...] My group gathered - people who had once served and returned. They immediately rushed into battle. Of course, there was no coordination. We checked the weapons during the smoke breaks between battles. It was fun.

The Main Directorate of Intelligence (Ukraine) reported that special forces and local resistance units had destroyed 20 Russian BMD-3 and BMD-4s in Hostomel. Ten more BMDs were destroyed near the city's glass factory.

The battle at the Hostomel Glass Factory was not just the work of my unit. There were guys from other units there, including the SSO, and for that I am very grateful. Our cooperation was a explosive mixture. There was a brutal massacre. If it weren’t for the civilians who had been wounded and killed during the mortar shelling, we might have taken prisoners. But they drove up to the checkpoint in their BMDs, and no one wanted to take prisoners. The enemy relied on the power of their weapons and decided to storm the improvised checkpoint at full speed. They didn’t know that we had come up with the idea of going to the crossroads with the forces that were there. Most likely, they thought that there were unprepared troops there. But unprepared doesn't mean unmotivated. The guys from the Territorial Defense Forces are enthusiastically doing things that many specialists would never have dreamed of.

A few days later, the Foreign Legion of the Main Intelligence Directorate arrived to help the "Shaman" battalion. On 2 March 2022, fighters from the Shaman Battalion assisted with evacuation of the wounded personnel and also took part in the Battle of Bucha. The battalion's fighters also carried out several successful sabotage operations during the Battle of Irpin. From 5 to 21 March 2022, the battalion participated in the Battle of Moshchun killing many Russian troops and destroying several pieces of equipment. There were 5 major engagements by the battalion in Moshchun at the distance from 20 to 70 meters. The "Shaman" battalion took part in engagements in the vanguard of the 72nd brigade. The battalion participated in all the important battles of the Northern Ukraine campaign and pushed back the Russians as retreated to Belarus through the Chernobyl Exclusion Zone. The battalion also prevented Russian troops from crossing the Irpin River. Following the culmination of the Battle of Kyiv, Shaman fighters pursued the Russians and struck from the rear until they completed the retreat. On 8 May 2022, special forces participated in a helicopter landing and combat operations during the Snake Island campaign.

There were several attempts at landing, and the enemy more or less understood that we wanted to do it, but did not expect the landing and attack itself. We also destroyed them there quite well… The most difficult thing is making a decision. I call it “agreeing with yourself” with various types of arguments… At that time, there were a minimum of arguments. Everyone understood that this was a difficult operation, but no one could back down, because there was no one who would say no. And that was it.

Ignatenko Vitaliy Andriyovych and Zaitsev Oleg Grigorovich were killed in the assault on snake island. In spring of 2022, the battalion took part in the Battle of Sievierodonetsk. In October 2022, Shaman Battalion, together with the Kraken Regiment and the Ukrainian international Legion, participated in an attempt to liberate the Zaporizhzhia NPP on 30 boats.

From December 2022 to March 2023, the “Shaman” battalion participated in the Battle of Bakhmut. The battalion also took part in the 2023 Belgorod Oblast incursions ambushing and killing a Russian military officer in a truck, it was the 10th high-profile killing of a Russian officer by the battalion which had already killed high-ranking officers like Colonel Vladimir Kuznetsov, commander of the 1009th motorized rifle regiment in an ambush near the Ukrainian border.

In early August 2023, the battalion conducted several raids on the left bank of the Dnipro near Kozachi Laheri as part of the Dnieper campaign along with Special Operations Forces, as well as the 222nd Battalion of the 126th Brigade of the Territorial Defense Forces and were able to destroy a Russian missile defense system.

== Symbolics ==
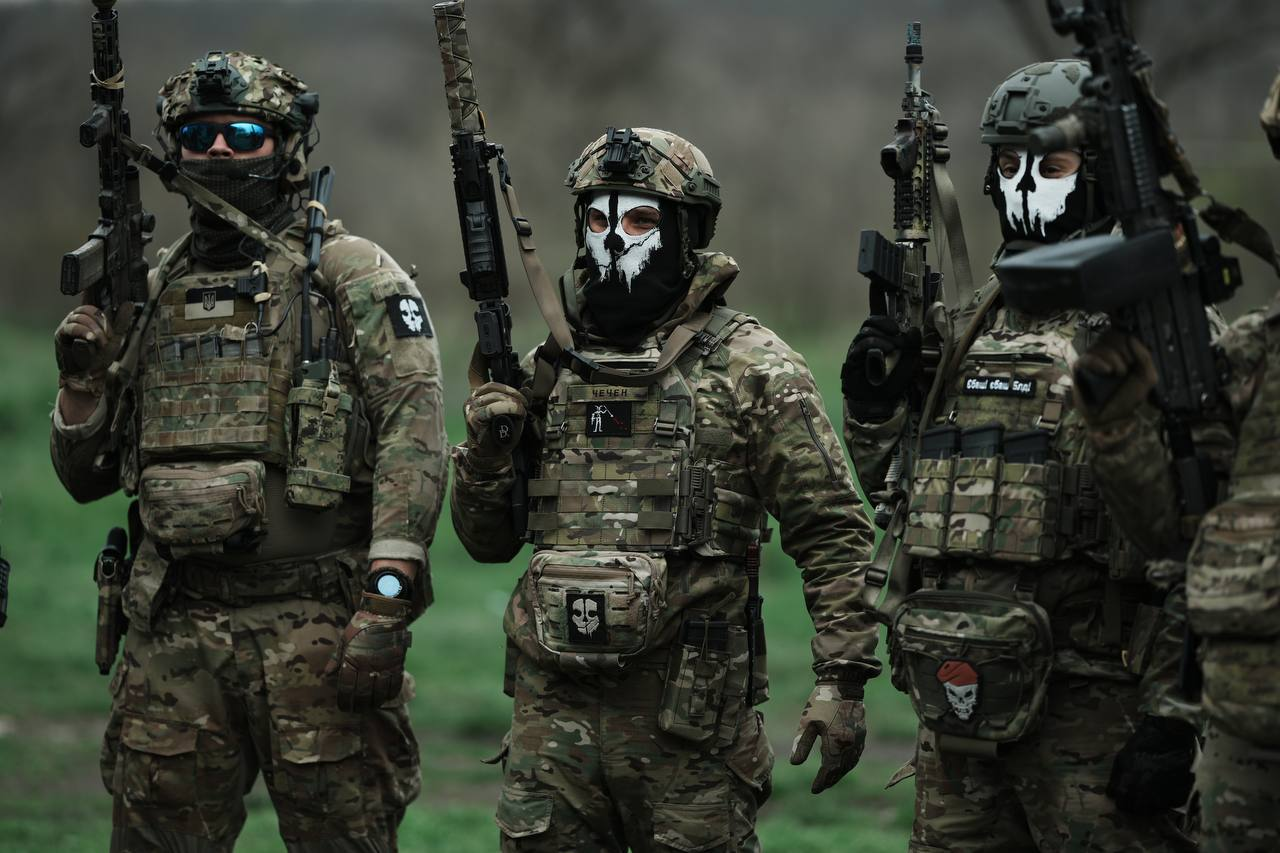

The unit's emblem and mascot "Ghost" are taken from the logo for the Ghosts faction from the Call of Duty game of the same name.

The game “Call of Duty” clearly shows how people, breaking all stereotypes, go against the rules, against everyone and everything. In order to defeat and punish the evil that fills this world. We firmly believe that after being in our unit you end up in God's army, because there is nowhere higher and that is why the Lord takes the best of us to serve Him. Call it the KMB before the army of Doomsday, that is why this chevron is worn on the left arm - close to the heart. Because Honor and Fidelity are the main qualities that we always adhere to.

== Personnel ==
The battalion is highly secretive in its operations and the names of its fighters are not usually disclosed, currently only some of the call signs of the battalion's fighters are known: "Shaman", "Sidney", "22", "Krasivy", "Philosopher", "KD", "Vityaz", "Chechen", "Domovoy".

== Tasks ==
The unit is specially skilled in diving, parachuting, and mountaineering operations. The primary task of the Shaman battalion is to "destroy infrastructure that is vital to the Kremlin’s military operations". The battalion has conducted several secret raids into Russian territory, where special forces were dropped by helicopter at night, crossing the border at low altitude to conduct operations deep behind the enemy lines.

The battalion's personnel have also undermined Russian columns from within by infiltrating the columns and then leading to their destruction. The battalion's personnel also conduct close reconnaissance, at times just a few dozen meters away from the Russians and could even hear what they were talking about. Directing artillery while behind the lines and attacking the Russian forces using grenade launchers from the rear are also among the battalion tasks.

Its operations also involved Mi-8 and Mi-26 helicopters of the Ukrainian Army Aviation.

== Equipment ==
Model	Image	Origin	Type	Number	Details
Heavy weaponry
AT4		Sweden; United States	Unguided, man-portable, disposable, shoulder-fired recoilless anti-tank weapon		
RPG-7		USSR	Reusable, unguided, shoulder-launched, anti-tank, rocket launcher		
RSHG-2		Russia	Unguided, shoulder-launched, rocket launcher		
NLAW		Sweden; United Kingdom	Fire-and-forget, lightweight shoulder-fired, and disposable line of sight ATGM		
Unmanned Aerial Vehicles
DJI Mavic		China	FPV drone		
Autel		China	FPV drone		
