= Georgian Legion (Ukraine) =

Georgian military unit in Ukraine

Georgian National Legion
- Грузинський національний легіон (Ukrainian) ქართული ლეგიონი (Georgian)
- Unit insignia
- Founded: 2014
- Country: Georgia and other countries
- Allegiance: Ukraine: Armed Forces of Ukraine
- Branch: Ukrainian Ground Forces
- Size: 2,500+ (February 2024)
- Part of: Ministry of Defense
- Patron: Georgia
- Engagements: Russo-Ukrainian War; War in Donbas; Russian invasion of Ukraine; Northern front; Battle of Antonov Airport; Battle of Kyiv; Battle of Hostomel; Battle of Moshchun; Battle of Irpin; Eastern front; Battle of Volnovakha; Battle of Izium; Battle of Rubizhne; Battle of Kharkiv; Siege of Mariupol; Battle of Bakhmut; 2024 Kursk offensive
- Website: https://georgianlegion.com.ua/en/

Commanders
- Current commander: Mamuka Mamulashvili

Insignia
- Flag

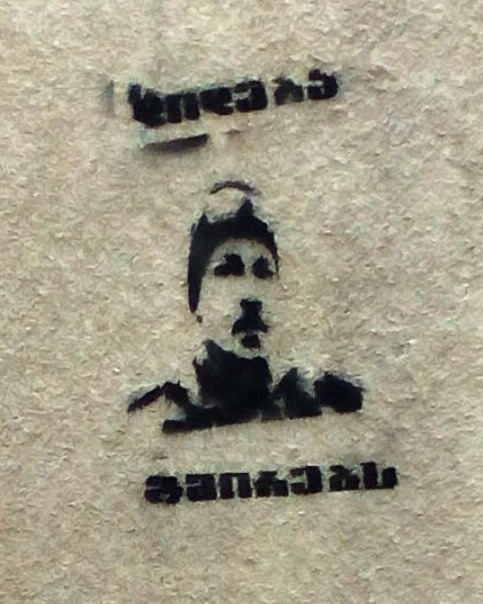
"Glory to Heroes", a stencil graffiti in Tbilisi, depicting the late volunteer Alexander Grigolashvili, in 2015.

The Georgian National Legion or Georgian Legion (Ukrainian: Грузинський національний легіон, romanized: Hruzynskyi natsionalnyi lehion; Georgian: ქართული ლეგიონი, romanized: kartuli legioni) is a military unit formed by mostly ethnic Georgian volunteers fighting on the side of Ukraine in the war in Donbas and the Russo-Ukrainian War. The unit was organized in 2014, and in 2016 it was made part of the Ukrainian Army, under the 25th Mechanized Infantry Battalion. On 15 June 2024, the unit was classified as a terrorist organization by the Russian government.

The unit was commanded by Mamuka Mamulashvili, a veteran Georgian officer.

The Georgian Legion was noted as being particularly good at recruiting Americans by Kacper Rekawek, an expert on foreign fighters in Ukraine; before the formation of the International Legion of Ukraine in 2022, most pro-Ukrainian foreign fighters served in the Georgian Legion.

As of June 2023, volunteers from 33 nationalities have joined the unit.

== History ==
=== Background ===
The Georgian Legion was founded by Mamuka Mamulashvili, a veteran of the Abkhaz–Georgian conflict, First Chechen War, and the Russo-Georgian War. He later commented “The idea of creating the legion was to gather people of different nationalities to serve together to stand against Russian aggression, and we did it.” Georgian volunteers frequently cited Ukraine and Georgia's common cause against Russia and insisted that fighting against the Russian aggression in Ukraine was also a patriotic act that served Georgia's interests.

=== Founding ===
The Georgian Legion was formed sometime in 2014 after the start of the war in the Donbas with initially only 6 Georgian members and had grown to about 20 members by the end of that year. In mid December 2014 the group was visited by Giorgi Baramidze, the then Georgian minister for European integration. In January 2015, the unit suffered its first casualty, Tamaz Sukhiashvili, a veteran of the Georgian Army. Involvement of individual Georgians on the Ukrainian side was, to a degree, encouraged by the then-Ukraine-based former President of Georgia Mikheil Saakashvili and his associates from Georgia's United National Movement party.

On 5 February, the Georgians' service was appreciated by the head of the Ukrainian Orthodox Church – Kiev Patriarchate, Patriarch Filaret, by awarding 29 Georgian fighters a medal for their "love and sacrifice for Ukraine."

After the Minsk II agreement of February 11, the future of the unit was briefly uncertain. In October the Ukrainian parliament passed a law allowing foreign nationals and stateless persons to be hired by the Ukrainian army on contract and the bill was signed into law on November 5.

=== Integration with the Ukrainian military ===
In February 2016, the Georgian Legion was officially integrated into the 25th mechanized infantry battalion "Kyiv Rus" of the Armed Forces of Ukraine.

It fought in eastern Ukraine under the overall command of the 54th Mechanized Brigade. In December 2017, the Legion withdrew from the brigade citing the "incompetence" of the brigade's command after a costly operation conducted near Svitlodarsk on 16 December 2017. The 54th Mechanized Brigade denied that a "Georgian Legion" had ever existed among their ranks.

In January 2018 the Legion's commander Mamulashvili said the unit remained committed to the Ukrainian cause and moved to another brigade and added that the decision was not connected to a political conflict between Mikheil Saakashvili and President of Ukraine Petro Poroshenko.

In February 2022, immediately prior to the Russian invasion of Ukraine, the Georgian Legion was involved in training newly recruited Ukrainian civilians. The unit took part in combat from the first days of the invasion; it fought in the Battle of Antonov Airport and Battle of Hostomel. The Legion was mainly part of the Main Directorate of Intelligence during the early stages of the invasion, and part of the unit later joined the 1st Special Purpose Brigade.

In early March 2022, the Georgian Legion reportedly had over 300 new interested recruits attempting to join. According to Legion policy, only experienced fighters or military veterans are allowed to join their ranks. People who didn't meet those requirements were refused. People with extremist views are also not welcome in the unit. The legion subsequently redeployed to help fend off the Eastern Ukraine offensive.

The Legion was integrated into the Special Operations Forces' 4th Assault Center in 2024 followed by the Ukrainian Volunteer Army on 14 December 2025.

=== Casualties ===
As of February 2024, 44 Georgian Legion volunteers have so far been reported killed in the Russian invasion of Ukraine. These include:

- Alexander (Alika) Tsaava, Arkadi Kasradze and Zaza Bitsadze, who were killed in Rubizhne.
- Giorgi Grigolia, who was killed during fighting near Bakhmut.
- Kiril Shanava and Kakha Gogol, who were killed during fighting in Luhansk Kakha Gogol was reportedly killed as a result of an airstrike.
- Aluda Zviadauri, who was killed during fighting near Lysychansk.
- Davit (Dato) Gobejishvili, Davit Menabdishvili and Nikoloz (Nika) Shanava, who were killed fighting in Izyum.
- Rati Shurgaia, who died as a result of injuries sustained during fighting near Izyum.

== Controversies ==
=== Accusation of war crimes ===
On 30 March 2022, a video surfaced of the aftermath of an ambushed Russian paratrooper BMD-2 armored vehicle, geolocated in the area of Dmytrivka located a few kilometers from Bucha, Kyiv Oblast. A different video of the same event shows how one of the captured and seemingly injured Russian serviceman is shot by an unknown member of the Ukrainian forces.

Ukrainian Foreign Minister Dmytro Kuleba said the video will "definitely be investigated". Mamuka Mamulashvili denied that Georgian in the video was part of the Legion.

In an interview published by the YouTube channel of the dissident Russian businessman Mikhail Khodorkovsky, Georgian Legion commander Mamuka Mamulashvili said about the treatment of Russian prisoners: "Sometimes we tie them hands and feet. I speak for the Georgian Legion, we will never take Russian prisoners." Mamulashvili said that his justification for ordering no quarter on Russian soldiers is a response to the Bucha massacre.

=== Accusations of coup plots in Georgia and Slovakia ===
On 18 September 2023, the State Security Service of Georgia (SSG) accused the Georgian Legion and Mamulashvili of plotting with Ukrainian intelligence to stage a coup d'état against the ruling Georgian Dream to restore arrested President Mikheil Saakashvili. Mamulashvili retorted that the claims of a coup were baseless and accused the Georgian Dream party of "receiving tasks from the Kremlin".

On 31 January 2025, the prime minister of Slovakia Robert Fico together with Slovak Information Service accused the Georgian Legion of organising anti-government demonstrations with the goal of a coup d'état in the country. At the press conference, Fico showed photographs of Mamulashvili with protest-organising group Mier Ukrajine (Peace to Ukraine) activist Lucia Štasselová and online news commentator Martin M. Šimečka, the father of opposition leader Michal Šimečka. Slovakia later banned commander Mamuka Mamulashvili and 10 other members of the RFE legion from entering Slovakia.

== Foreign fighters ==
The Georgian Legion is made up of about 500 Georgians and an equal number of various other nationalities.

The following countries have had nationals reported as being members of the Georgian Legion:

- Albania
- Armenia
- Australia
- Austria
- Azerbaijan
- Canada
- Chile
- Croatia
- France
- Georgia
- Germany
- Greece
- India
- Israel
- Japan
- Mexico
- Moldova
- Serbia
- Taiwan
- United Kingdom
- United States

== Activities ==
The Legion conducts sabotage, ambush and reconnaissance activities behind enemy lines and participated in a number of major battles. They also instruct and train Ukrainian civilians, police officers, soldiers and foreign volunteers.

== See also ==
- International Legion (Ukraine), a similar unit of foreign volunteers fighting for Ukraine, established in 2022.
