= Antonov Airport =

Cargo airport in Kyiv, Ukraine

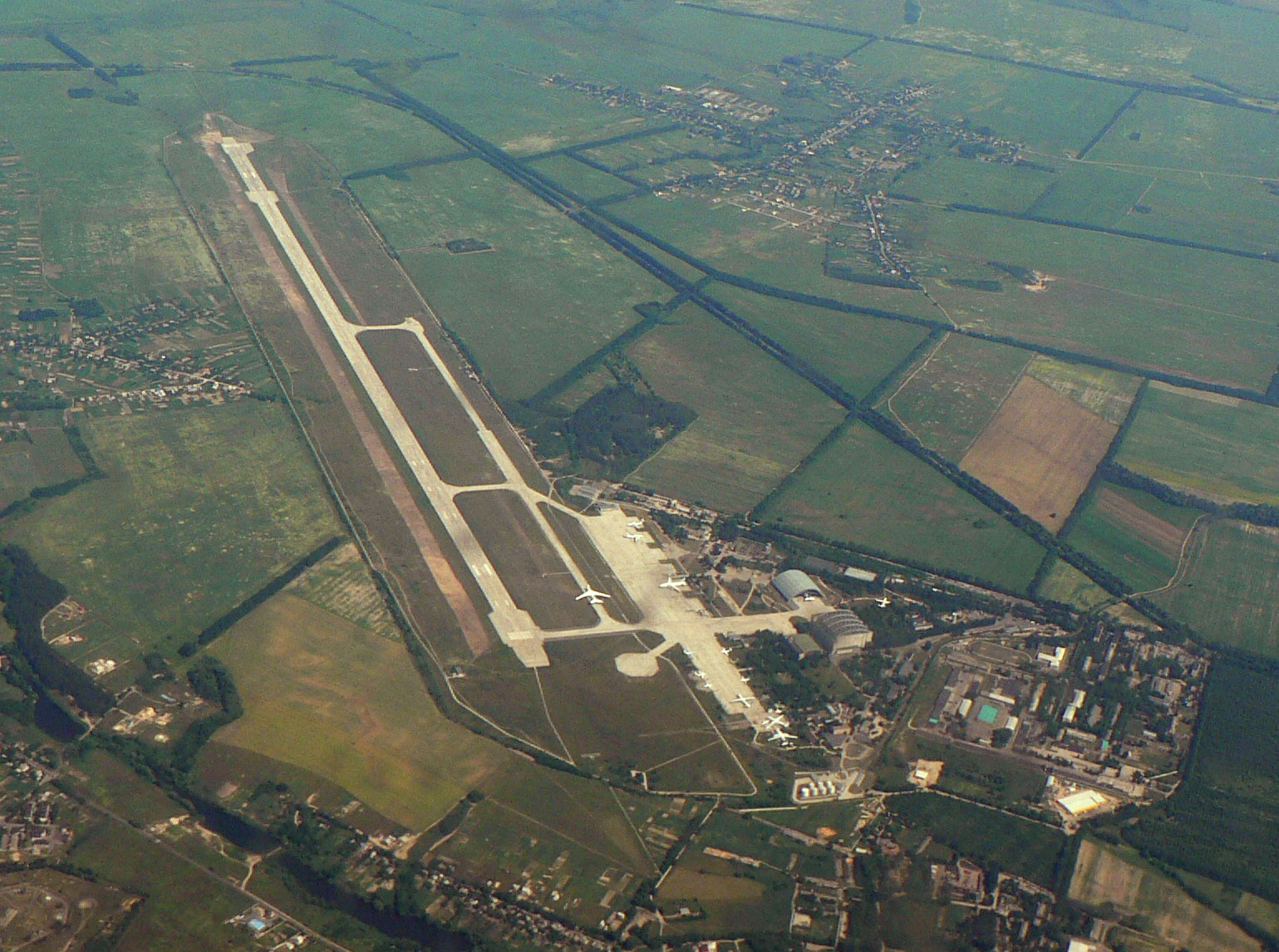

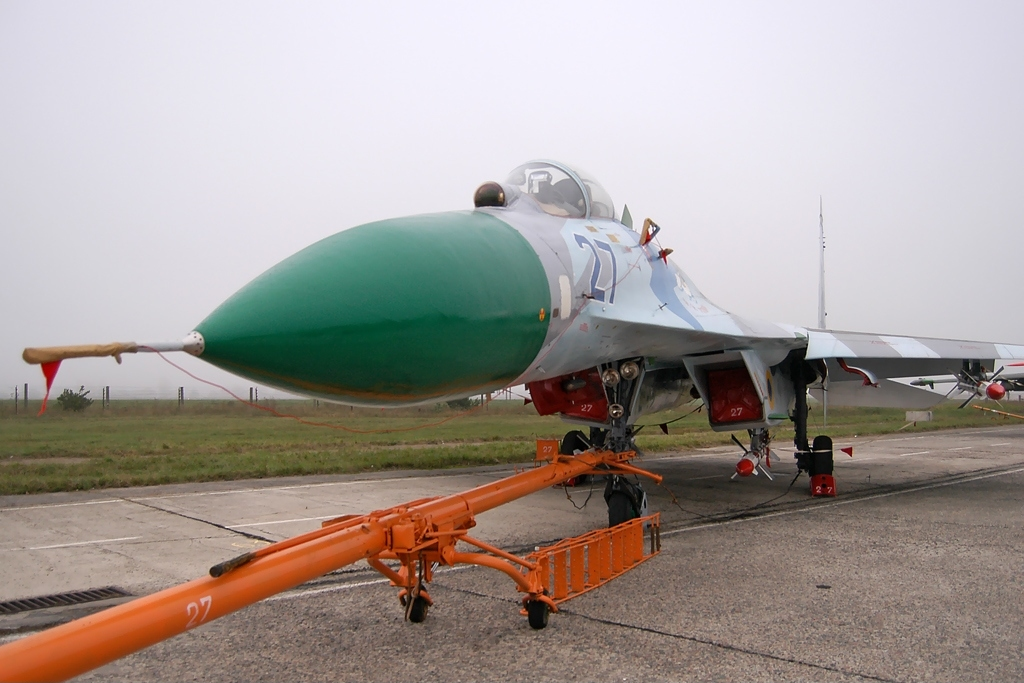
- Ukraine Air Force Sukhoi Su-27 at the airport
- IATA: GML; ICAO: UKKM

Summary
- Airport type: Civil government
- Operator: Antonov Airlines
- Serves: Kyiv
- Location: Hostomel, Kyiv Oblast, Ukraine
- Elevation AMSL: 517 ft (158 m)
- Coordinates: 50°36′13″N 30°11′31″E

Maps
- Location of the airport in Ukraine Location of the airport in Kyiv Oblast
- Interactive map of Antonov Airport

Runways
Direction	Length		Surface
Direction	m	ft	Surface
15/33	3,500	11,483	Concrete

Antonov Airport (IATA: GML, ICAO: UKKM) (Ukrainian: аеропорт «Антонов» [ɐeroˈpɔrt ɐnˈtɔnou̯]), also known as Hostomel (or Gostomel) Airport (Ukrainian: аеропорт «Гостомель»), is an international cargo airport and testing facility in Ukraine, located near Hostomel, which is a northwestern suburb of Kyiv. (Note: Boryspil and Zhuliany are the other two airports that serve Kyiv)

The airport is owned by and named after the Antonov aircraft manufacturing company and operated by its subsidiary Antonov Airlines. The destroyed An-225 was based at the airport.

During the first two days of the 2022 Russian invasion of Ukraine, Russian Airborne Forces (VDV) captured the airport following two air assaults combined with a Russian Ground Forces armored assault. Extensive damage prevented the airport's use as a forward operating base; the single Antonov An-225 Mriya, the world's largest aircraft was destroyed in the battle. Russian forces held the airport for 36 days until their withdrawal from Kyiv Oblast.

== History ==
Construction of the airport began in 1959 (67 years ago). Commercial cargo operations at the airport began in 1989 with the first attempts at demilitarizing and commercializing of the Antonov Design Bureau.

=== 2022 Russian invasion of Ukraine ===
On 24 February 2022, the first day of the 2022 Russian invasion of Ukraine, the airport was attacked and seized by the Russian military. On the day, Ukrainian President Volodymyr Zelenskyy said "The enemy paratroopers in Hostomel have been blocked, and troops have received an order to destroy them". Later in the day, between 8-10 PM local time (UTC+2) reports surfaced that the airport had been retaken, but heavy fighting continued for weeks at the airport and in neighboring Hostomel. Ukrainian forces regained control of the airport by 2 April, but the airport sustained extensive damage and the notable An-225 cargo aircraft was destroyed.

The Virgin Galactic owner, Sir Richard Branson, visited the President of Ukraine and the damaged airport and had interest in investing in rebuilding it.

== Aircraft testing operations ==
Hostomel Airport was originally built as a top-secret in-house Flight Testing and Improvement Base (Ukrainian: Льотно-випробувальна і довідна база) for Antonov airplanes. It is equipped with special equipment for it (e.g., artificial lightning generator) and granted a purpose test flight zone. Its sister facility, responsible for manufacturing, is located inside Kyiv at the Sviatoshyn Airfield.

== Cargo operations ==
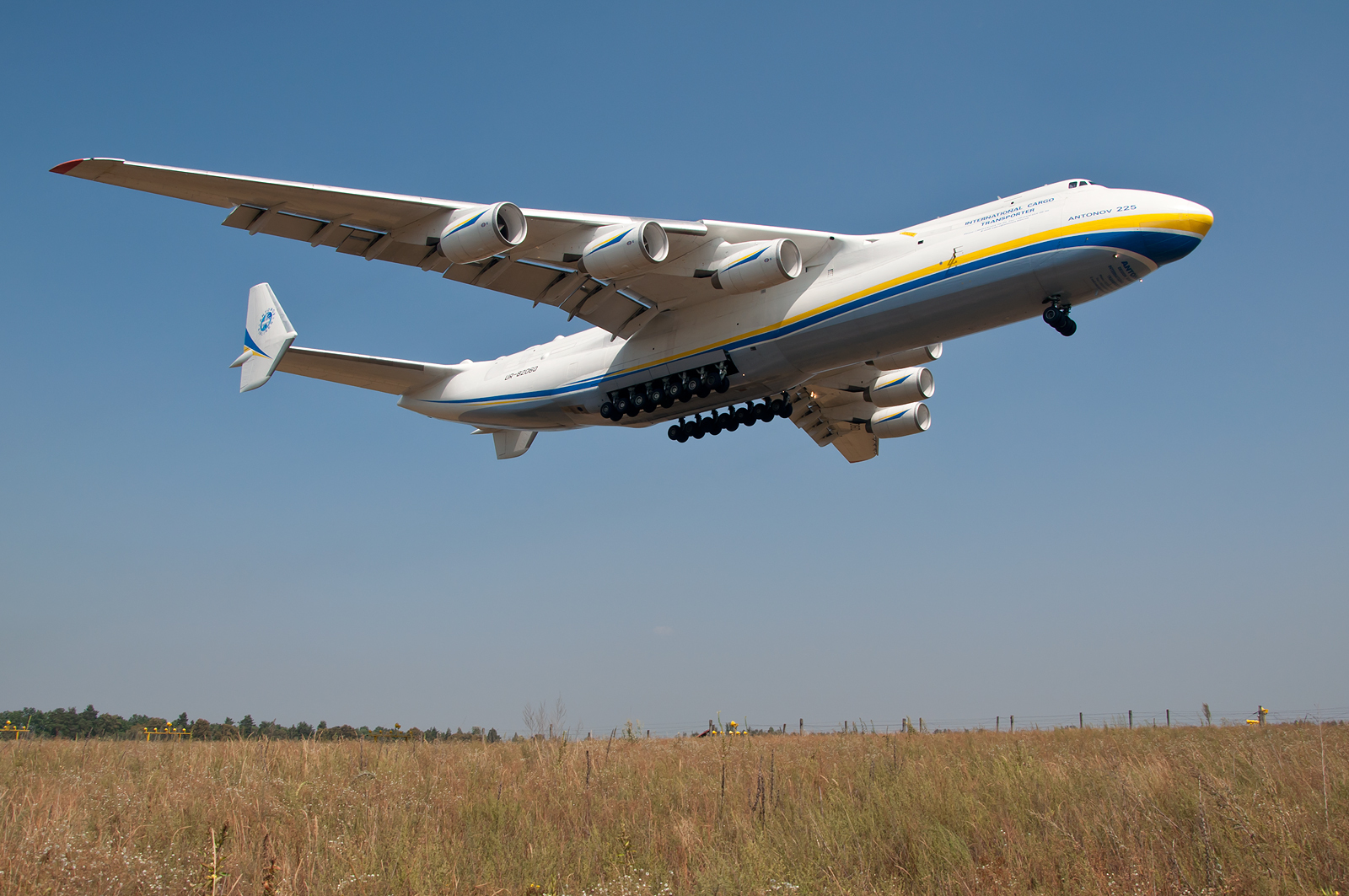
Antonov Airlines Antonov An-225 landing at Hostomel (2014)

The airport is used by Antonov Airlines, as well as by other interested cargo carriers. The following facilities and services are available on site:

- transshipping (air-to-auto; air-to-railway (Note: Via the Bucha railroad station of the Ukrainian Railways.))
- storage capacities
- border control and customs
- aircraft maintenance

== Military presence ==
Ukrainian Air Force was using the airport for its transportation forces.

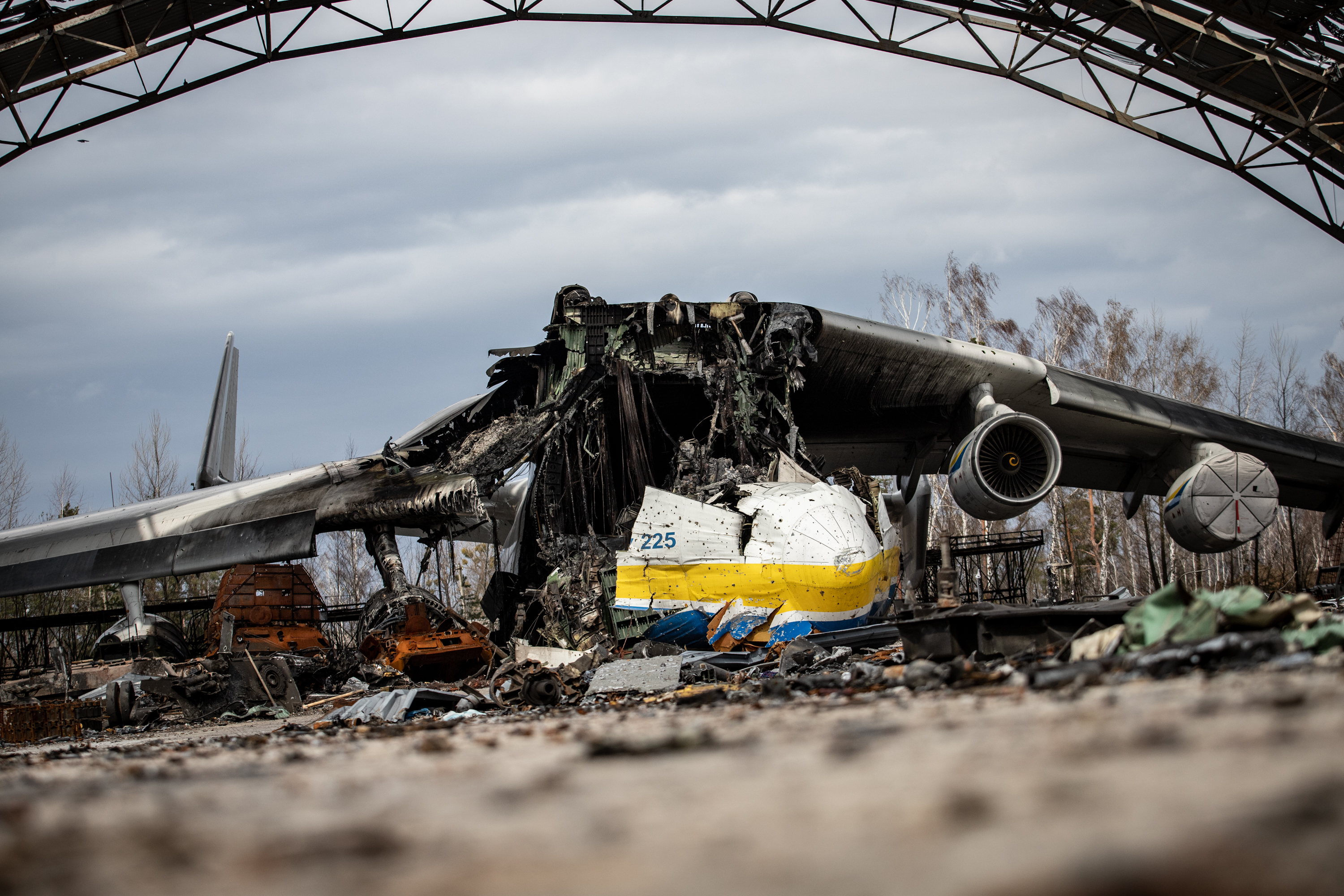
The An 225 was destroyed in the Ukraine-Russian war.

The An-225 "Mriya" (tr. 'dream' or 'inspiration'), the world's largest cargo aircraft, was located at Hostomel Airport and it was partially destroyed during the 2022 Russian invasion of Ukraine. A number of other aircraft were also destroyed.

== See also ==
- List of airports in Ukraine
- List of the busiest airports in Ukraine
