= Taiwan–Ukraine relations =

- Taiwan: Ukraine

Taiwan–Ukraine relations refer to the international relations between Taiwan and Ukraine. Bilateral relations after Ukraine's independence began in 1992.

Taiwan has no representative office in Ukraine. The consulate issues were handled via the representative office located in Moscow. But this authority has been transferred to Taipei representative office in Warsaw on 26 February 2022 due to the outbreak of the Russian invasion of Ukraine.

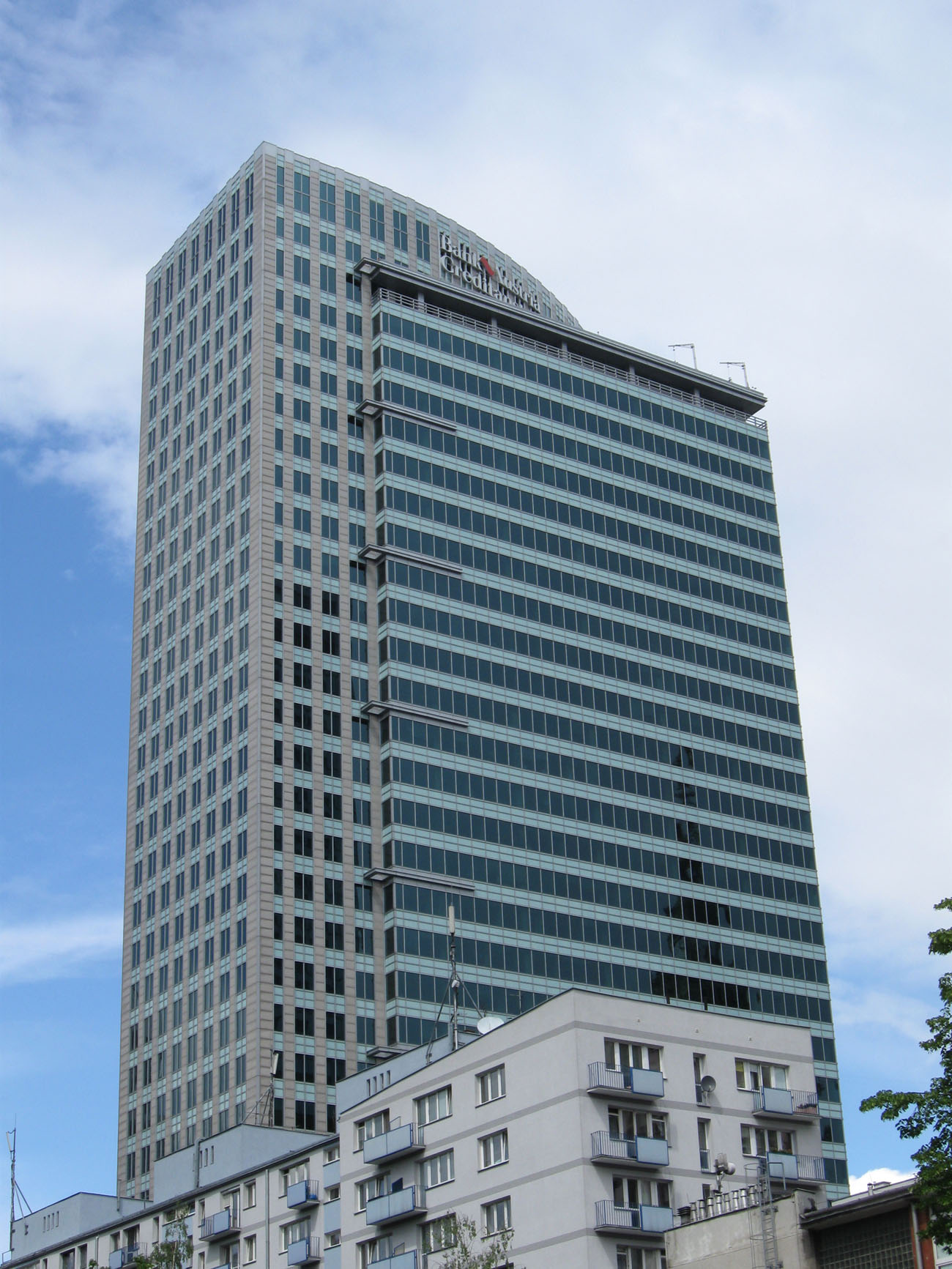
Taipei representative office in Warsaw, Poland

== History ==
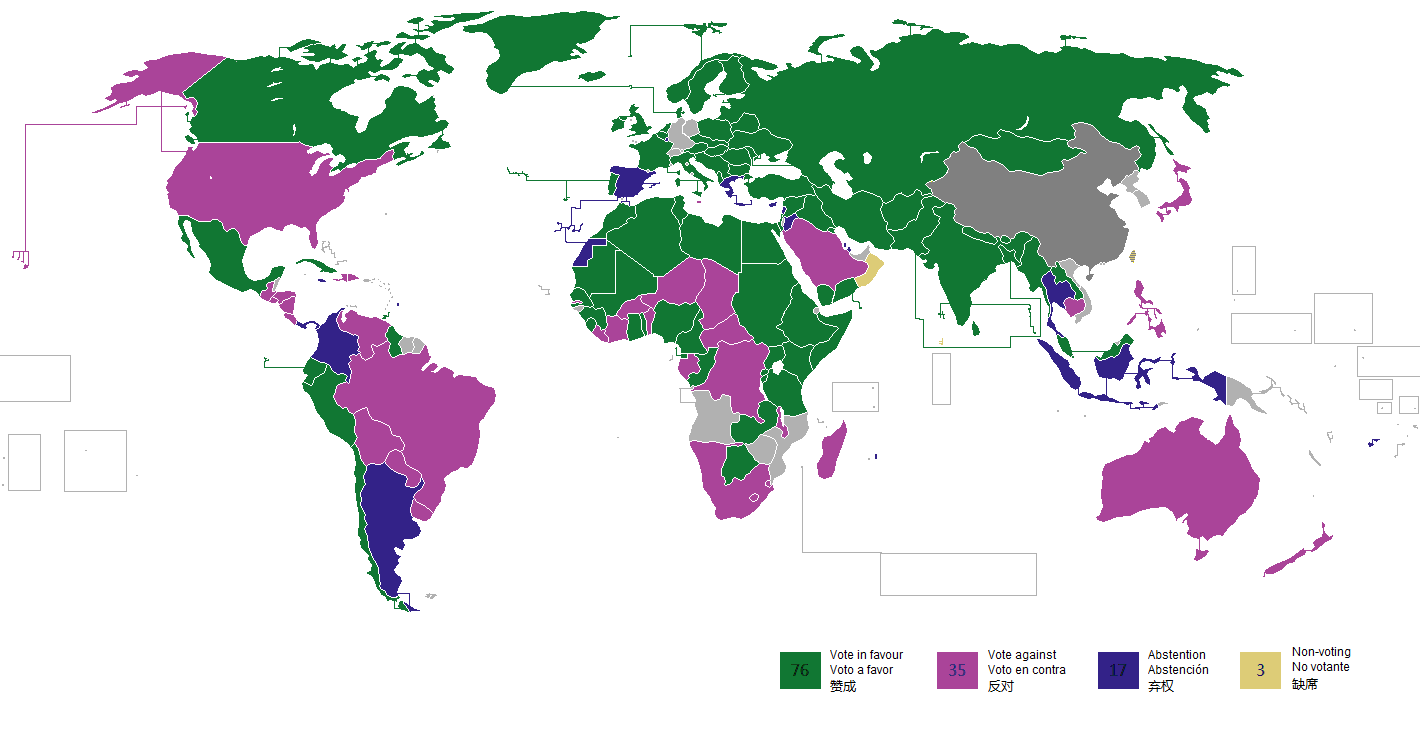
Voting situation in the UN general assembly respect to resolution 2758 (1971).

=== Cold War ===
The Republic of China government retreated to Taiwan during the Chinese Civil War. With the onset of the Cold War, the legitimate representative of China in the United Nations became a point of dispute between member states.

On 24 November 1966, the United Nations General Assembly met at the twenty-first session to discuss the representation of China. The Soviet Ukrainian representative spoke at first, advocating to vacate the seat of the Republic of China immediately and change the representative right to the People's Republic of China, claiming that the case was not under the scope of important issue covered by the Article 18 of the Charter of the United Nations.

After the session, the General Assembly passed Resolution 1668, declaring that any proposal to change the representation of China at the United Nations would require two-thirds majority vote.

The end of the 1960s and the beginning of the 1970s saw the rapid deterioration of Taiwan's diplomatic relations. On 26 August 1971, as Taiwan was on the edge of being expelled from the United Nations, the ambassador of Taiwan to Honduras requested through foreign minister of Honduras to suggest dual representation as an alternative to Communist China's representation in the United Nations, citing the Soviet Union, Soviet Belarus and Soviet Ukraine as examples. At the United Nations General Assembly Resolution 2758, the Soviet Ukrainian representatives along with majority of the UN members voted support to expel the representatives of Taiwan.

=== 1992: First contact ===
Taiwanese airplane Boeing 747 (B-160) at Kyiv
- In April 1992, a Taiwanese plane Boeing 747 arrived in Kyiv to deliver medicines. The plane was carrying Taiwan's Undersecretary of Foreign Affairs Chiang Hsiao-yen.
- Photo link
- Photo link2

After the fall of the Soviet Union, and the independence of Ukraine. In response to the generally poor political and economic situation in the former Soviet Union countries, the United States was concerned that the collapse of the Soviet Union would lead to an influx of refugees into Western Europe. The U.S. hoped that Taiwan would provide direct financial assistance in U.S. dollars to Russia and Ukraine, as Taiwan had an abundant foreign exchange reserve at the time. This also prompted Taiwan to make Belarus and Ukraine the target of diplomatic breakthrough.

The U.S. asked Taiwan for $30 million in aid, and proposed to give half of it to Russia and half to Ukraine. Qian Fu and Chiang Hsiao Yen decided to provide aid in kind instead of direct money to the United States. Therefore, the final aid case was changed that Taiwan to provide living supplies, medicine and medical equipment. The initial donation was set at US$30 million, but only US$10 million was spent in the end. Since there is no direct flight between Taiwan and Ukraine, the Boeing 747s were transported from Vladivostok, Russia, back to the Keelung Harbor and arrived in Kyiv by a tortuous voyage.

In January 1992, Taiwan's Undersecretary for Foreign Affairs Chiang Hsiao-yen visited Ukraine for the first time to exchange views with Ukraine on economic and trade cooperation, science and technology. He met with the Minister of Defense, the Minister of Investment and Construction, and the Minister of Foreign Economic Relations of Ukraine even though it was the time when China and Ukraine established diplomatic relations.

In March 1992, Chinese diplomat Yu Zhenqi learned from the Russian newspaper Izvestia that a Taiwanese plane would be arriving in Kyiv at the end of March. In the afternoon of April 7, Yu Zhenqi learned from a newspaper that Chang Hsiao-yen would arrive in Kyiv on the same day and that an agreement on the establishment of a diplomatic mission might be reached. Yu Zhenqi made an urgent appointment with Ukrainian First Deputy Foreign Minister Makarevich to make representations. Makarevich claimed that never heard of Taiwan setting up a representative agency in Kyiv. China has asked the Ukrainian side not to have any official contact with Taiwanese officials.

At 12:30 p.m., the Ukrainian state television broadcast the unloading of medicine from the Taiwanese plane, no Ukrainian officials appeared.

On the morning of April 8, Yu Zhenqi called the Vice Dean of the Ukrainian Institute of International Relations, Kulinich, and organized a mobilization of Chinese students studying in Ukraine, those students all had a high political passion for this. However, one of the Chinese students found out that the Ukrainian Minister of Health was present at the handover ceremony. Yu Zhenqi again raised the issue with Makarevich, who said that it was unexpected and the actions of individual officials. This incident also made Ukrainian President Kravchuk furious. He criticized the official at the cabinet meeting and announced that the cabinet members are not allowed to participate in any Taiwan-related activities in the future.

On April 11, Taiwan's Undersecretary for Foreign Affairs left Kyiv. Ukraine, soon after independence, suffered from economic difficulties, and there were still some pro-Taiwan Ukrainian MPs and economists who advocate establishing diplomatic relations with Taiwan in exchange for aid. This led to an unusual parliamentary speech in which Kulinich (also a member of parliament) broke his silence and expressed his opposition. He said.

If Ukraine establishes diplomatic relations with Taiwan, it is tantamount to China recognizing the independence of Crimea. Please think seriously about the seriousness of this issue.

After this speech, people suddenly realized that no one in the Ukrainian parliament would dare to raise the issue of establishing diplomatic relations with Taiwan from then on.

=== 1996: Second contact ===
Taiwan's diplomatic activism reached its peak during the presidency of Ukrainian President Leonid Kuchma. In 1996, Taiwan attempted to have a second official exchange with Ukraine in a secret diplomacy.

In July 1996, diplomatic preparations began. In order to avoid Chinese protests, Lien Chan's trip was completely concealed, so much so that the Taiwanese media did not even know which foreign city he was visiting, with some newspapers mistakenly thinking it was Munich, Germany or Budapest, Hungary, and only the United Daily News guessed it was Kyiv. This was a rare situation in the Taiwan press, and it was not the usual style to have no accompanying reporters. Also in contrast to the United States, where American people hated the press media and supported the government's exclusion of reporters during major events.

On August 18, 1996, Lien Chan was invited by Victor Vasilyovich Skopenko, Rector of Kyiv University, to receive an honorary doctorate degree from the university. On August 22, Lien Chan returned to Taipei and gave a press conference on his visit to Ukraine. He did not disclose official details of his visit to Kyiv because Ukraine promised not to provoke China.

When the Chinese government learned of the incident afterwards, it took an unusually tough stance and launched a series of fierce diplomatic retaliations against Ukraine. This included the refusal of Chinese envoys to participate in Ukraine's Independence Day celebrations, the cancellation of a major visit to Ukraine, and the avoidance of meetings with the Ukrainian military delegation. China's protests also strained relations between China and Ukraine. The Chinese media at the time downplayed the issue.

The visit in 1996 generated a lot of media coverage in Taiwan. Lien Chan also told the public that he could work with Ukraine in the aviation and metallurgy industries. The incident led to speculation in the mass media in Taiwan, Hong Kong, and neighboring countries that Taiwan and Ukraine could develop military ties. However, Lien Chan's visit also resulted in a strong stance by China, which in turn limited the development of relations between Ukraine and Taiwan. As a result, relations between the two sides were frozen until 2001.

According to sources, Military Intelligence Bureau chief Yin Zongwen broke through Russia's international intelligence network and sent four pilots to Ukraine in early 1996 to try out a SU-27 fighter jet. In 2004, the Canadian magazine Kanwa Intelligence Review revealed further insider story, reporting that the Taiwanese Air Force had sent pilots to Kyiv to test-fly the Su-27SK and had received some assistance from Ukrainian experts in tactical training, as well as attempting to obtain information on maintenance parts for the second-hand fighter. Taiwan's eagerness to obtain the performance parameters of the PLA's mass-imported Su-27SK led to an intense military intelligence war between Taiwan and China in Ukraine. On April 30, 2004, the MIB issued a gag order on the report and refused to comment on it.

=== 2004–2007: From friendliness to frostiness ===
After the Orange Revolution, Chen Shui-bian learned that Viktor Yushchenko had been elected president of Ukraine, and the Taiwanese government sent a telegram to congratulate him. Chen Shui-bian mentioned in the telegram that Taiwan also completed the change of political parties in 2000 and conducted the first referendum in 2004, which was the first time for the people of Taiwan to have the basic human right of referendum.

The Chen administration initially admired the Yushchenko government, even going so far as to include an orange scarf presented by David Kilgour, a member of Canada's federal House of Commons, as a presidential artifact. However, the friendship between the two sides was short-lived.

In December 2005, Taiwan's Deputy Secretary of the Presidential Office Huang Chi-fang accepted an invitation from Ukrainian MP Viktor Pinchuk to visit the country. It surprised Ukrainian Prime Minister Yury Ekhanurov. He reprimanded the Ukrainian Foreign Ministry and said that granting visas to Taiwanese officials would only harm relations between Ukraine and China, as China does not consider Taiwan a country.

After 2006, Taiwan abolished its representative office in Minsk. The official reasons for the abolition were the lack of functionality and the unfriendliness of Belarus to Taiwan. As for the suspension of contact with Ukraine, no official reason was provided. The reporter of United Daily News believes that this is also the beginning of the regression of Taiwan–Ukraine relations, which had continued until March 2022.

=== 2022 Russian invasion of Ukraine ===
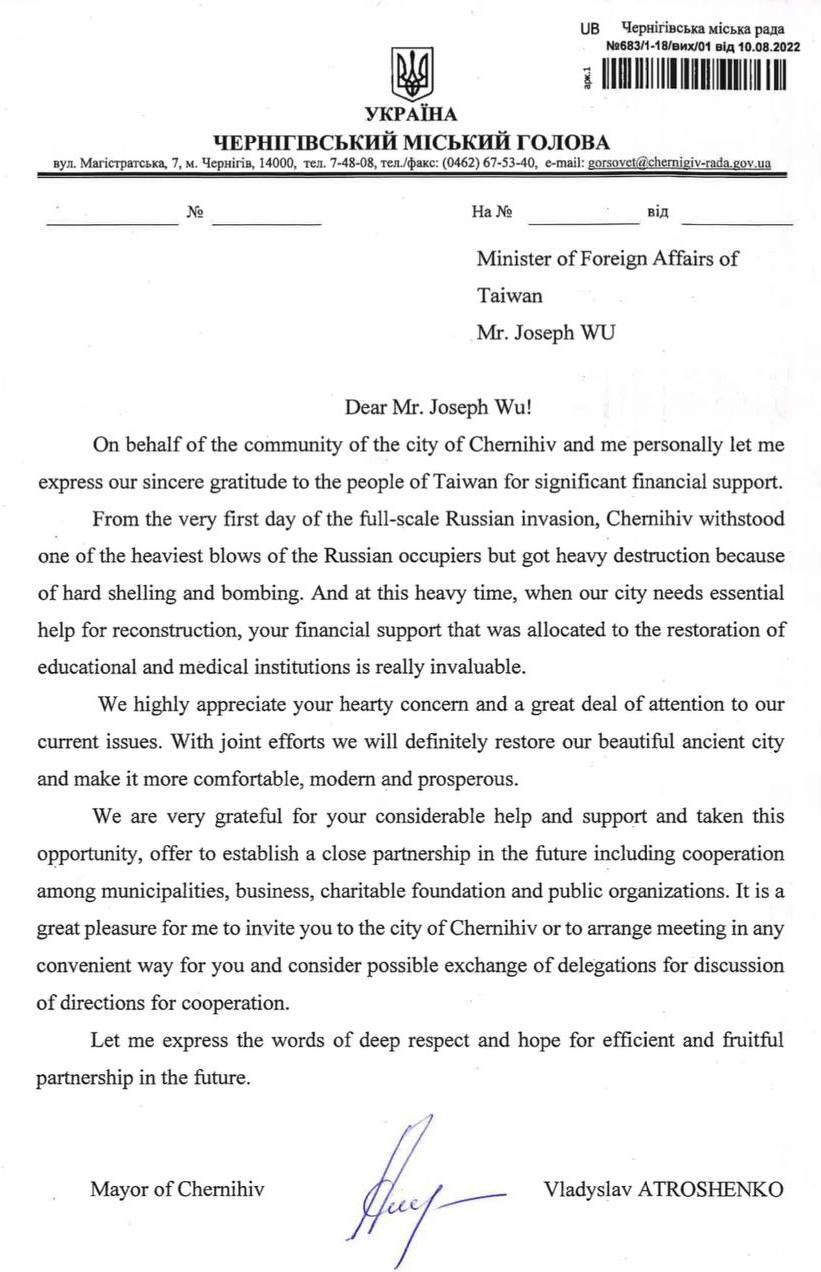
Letter of thanks from Mayor of Chernihiv Vladyslav Atroshenko to Minister of Foreign Affairs of Taiwan Joseph Wu for the financial aid Taiwan provided to the city following the 2022 Russian invasion of Ukraine

In 2022, Taiwan sent humanitarian aid to Ukraine in response to the Russian military invasion of the country. 27 tons of medical supplies were sent to Ukraine.

A small number of Taiwanese volunteers have served in the International Legion of Territorial Defense of Ukraine. In November 2022 Taiwanese army veteran Tseng Sheng-guang was killed while fighting with the International Legion.

On 22 April 2022, Minister of Foreign Affairs of Taiwan Joseph Wu held a meeting via video conferencing with Mayor of Kyiv Vitali Klitschko. During the meeting, Wu announced that $3 million would be provided to aid in reconstruction of Kyiv following the Russian invasion of Ukraine, while the remaining $5 million will go to six medical institutions in Ukraine.

In response to the Russian invasion of Ukraine, Taiwan imposed sanctions against Russia and numerous rallies in support of Ukraine have taken place in the Taiwanese capital city of Taipei. According to Nikkei Asia, anti-China sentiment and pro-Taiwan momentum is growing within Ukrainian public opinion due to China's refusal to condemn or even criticize Russia's invasion of Ukraine, as well as China's amicable relations with Russia.

In August 2022, 15 MPs of the Verkhovna Rada became part of a cross-parliamentary group to promote closer friendship, trade, and cultural ties with Taiwan. One of the members of the group, MP Inna Sovsun, stated that the group would serve as a bridge that would start cooperation between Ukrainian and Taiwanese MPs at the official level and may lead to the future opening of a representative office of Taiwan in Ukraine.

Military connections between the two countries have increased. Ukraine has purchased significant quantities of military drones from Taiwan. Early in the conflict Ukrainian forces ordered 800 mortar dropping drones from Taiwanese manufacturer DronesVision through Polish intermediaries.

At the 2025 Shangri-La Dialogue in Singapore French President Emmanuel Macron stated that Taiwan's future security was a major reason to back Ukraine in its war against Russia. China protested Macron's comparison of Taiwan and Ukraine.

=== Recent exchanges ===
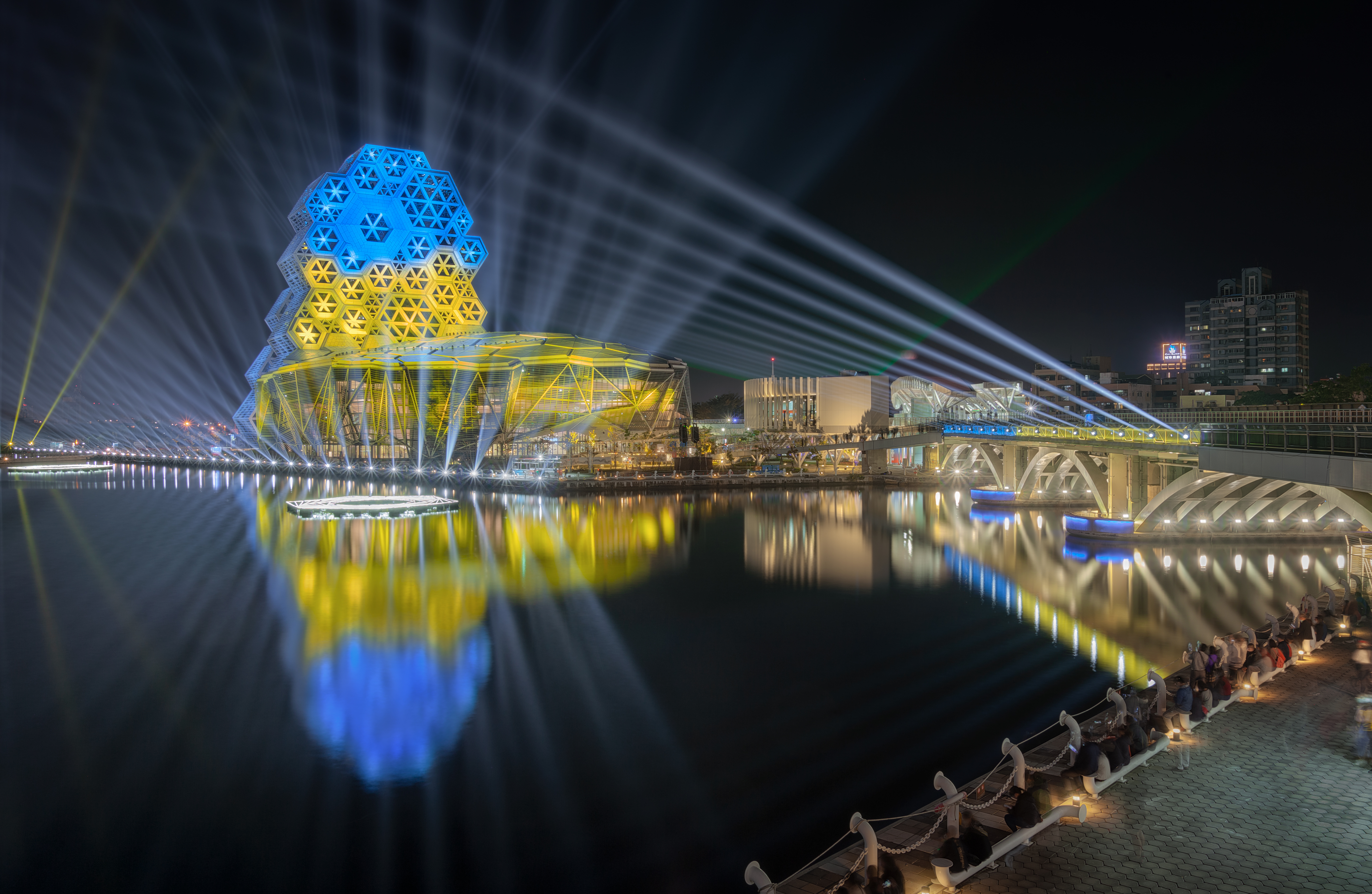
In 2022 Taiwan Lantern Festival, The Kaohsiung Music Center illuminated in the colors of Ukraine's national flag to show Taiwanese support of Ukraine. Photographed in February, 2022

In October 2022, Ukrainian lawmaker Kira Rudik visited Taiwan.

In May 2023, the Taiwanese government donated US$5 million to a Lithuanian government-led project to rebuild schools in Ukraine. On 24 August 2023, the Ruta Kindergarten was opened in Irpin, it was first joined humanitarian aid project led by Taiwan and Lithuania.

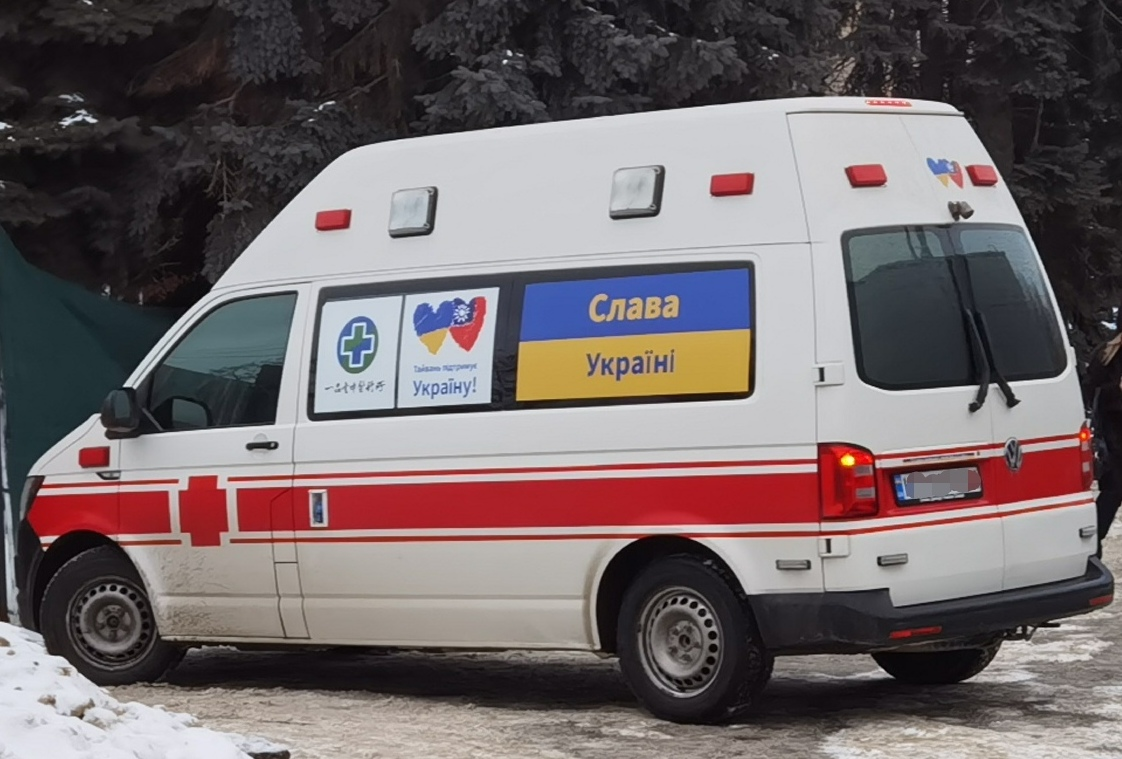
An ambulance in Dnipro, donated by Taiwan during war.

In December 2024, Andriy Sadovyi became the first Ukrainian mayor to visit Taiwan. On his five-day visit to Taiwan, Sadovyi thanked the Taiwanese government for its new US$5 million donation to renovate a rehabilitation center in Lviv.

== Issue on diplomatic missions ==
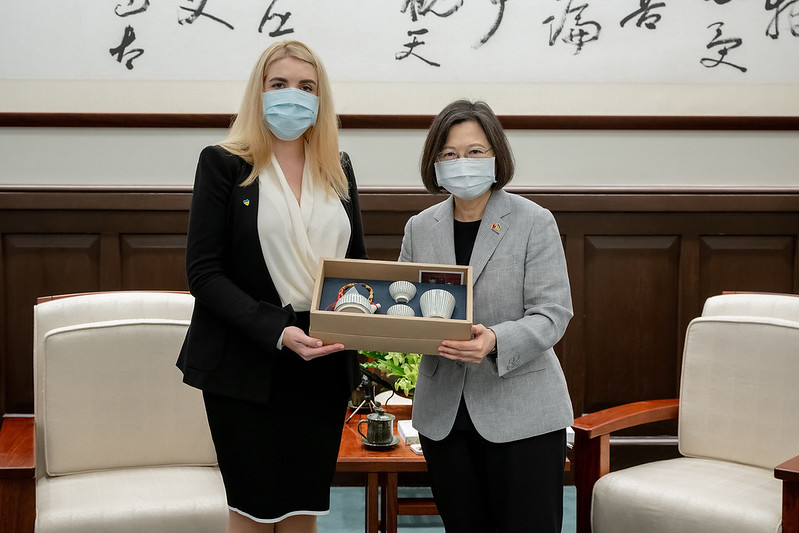
Ukrainian parliamentarian Kira Rudik meets with President of Taiwan Tsai Ing-wen (2022)

Taiwan has been planning to establish a consulate in Kyiv since 1992. Alarmed by the Latvian model, the Chinese government made representations to the Ukrainian diplomatic service and received an immediate commitment from the Ukrainian side that it would not allow a Taiwanese consulate to appear, as it had in Latvia. Then, Taiwan saw that the establishment of the consulate was unsuccessful and turned to seek a representative office.

On February 9, 2001, when former Ukrainian President Leonid Kravchuk visited Taiwan as a member of parliament, Chen Shui-bian told him that Taiwan and Ukraine should establish a representative office to increase exchanges. However, As of 2013, Ukraine did not respond to the request.

The establishment of a representative office has also been hindered by the demands of the Ukrainian side. According to a joint report by Bai-Ku Wei and Viktor Oleksiyovich Kiktenko, the Ukrainian authorities want Taiwan to invest heavily in military industrial technology and help the military industry realize its "military-to-civilian" program. Taiwan, on the other hand, is asking for the establishment of a representative office first, and then to discuss investment in depth. At the same time, the Ukrainian side also hopes that Taiwan will first provide a large amount of financial assistance to Ukraine, similar to the Belarusian approach.

== Consular services ==
In 1996, the Taipei Representative Office in Belarus was established to also conduct consular services in Ukraine, and in 2006, Taiwan abolished its Minsk office and transferred the Ukraine business to the Taipei Office in Moscow, which continued until March 2022. In March 2022, after the Russian invasion of Ukraine, Taiwan transferred its Ukraine business from the Taipei Office in Moscow to the Taipei Office in Poland.

== Academic exchange ==
On January 7, 1993, Rector Skopenko of Kyiv University visited Taiwan for nine days, during which time Kyiv University signed a contract with Culture University and Chiao Tung University to start bilateral academic exchanges.

=== Ukrainian language teaching ===
The following is a list of the most important universities that cooperate with Ukraine and teach Ukrainian.

List of Taiwanese universities that teach Ukrainian
| Taiwan school | Ukraine school | Begin year | Details |
|---|---|---|---|
| Chinese Culture University | Kyiv University | 1993 | On January 12, 1993, Chinese Culture University and Kyiv University became sister schools, and in 1994, the university invited a female professor from Kyiv University to teach Ukrainian in Taipei. In 1996, the Russian Department of the university sent 14 exchange students to Kyiv University for one year. At that time, most of the Taiwanese students were studying Russian and only one was studying Ukrainian (also Russian). Since 1996, Ukrainian has been offered as an elective course at CCU, and in 2005, after 12 years of academic cooperation between the two universities, Ukrainian was made a compulsory course in the Russian department. According to a rough estimate, 30–40 students in the university's junior year had studied Ukrainian every year. From 1997 to 2002, four students from Kyiv University also studied Chinese at the university. |

== See also ==
- Foreign relations of Taiwan
- Foreign relations of Ukraine
