= Sharon Wu =

Taiwanese diplomat

- 吳尚年
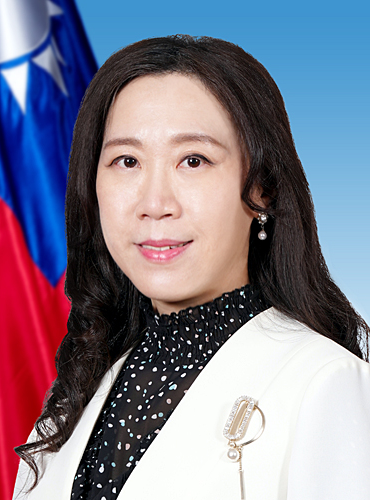
- Official portrait

Representative of Taiwan to Poland
- In office 4 August 2023 – August 2024
- Preceded by: Bob L. J. Chen
- Succeeded by: Jeff Y.J. Liu

Personal details
- Born: Wu Shang-Nian Taiwan
- Spouse: Jason C. C. Lien
- Education: National Chengchi University (BA)
- Occupation: Diplomat

Chinese name
- Traditional Chinese: 吳尚年
- Simplified Chinese: 吴尚年
Transcriptions
Standard Mandarin
- Hanyu Pinyin: Wú Shàngnián
Southern Min
- Hokkien POJ: Ngô͘ Sióng-liân

Sharon Shang-Nian Wu (Chinese: 吳尚年; pinyin: Wú Shàngnián) is a Taiwanese diplomat who has been the representative to Poland since 2023. Additionally, she is a senior official involved in the Asia-Pacific Economic Cooperation (APEC).

== Diplomatic career ==
=== Ministry of Foreign Affairs ===
The 103rd report from the Budget Center of the Legislative Yuan highlighted a lack of elimination rate for the training plan of new diplomatic consular and administrative personnel by the Ministry of Foreign Affairs in November 2014. Over the past decade, the Ministry has not taken steps to eliminate unsuitable personnel. The Ministry of Foreign Affairs and International Affairs' secretary, Sharon Wu, stated that year's training process was more stringent than 2013. She clarified that in 2014, there are two diplomatic employees who are not fit for elimination and that the Ministry has been working to enhance the training and removal process for new diplomats in order to raise the caliber of new hires.

Wu, director of international organisations at the Ministry of Foreign Affairs, stated in March 2021 that Taiwan's successful model for preventing epidemics has gained international recognition and has made it clear to the world community that Taiwan must be included in the World Health Organization (WHO) immediately. The World Health Assembly (WHA) was scheduled to take place in May.

After the APEC Informal Leaders' Retreat, the Presidential Office hosted a press conference that evening on 16 July 2021. State representatives in attendance, such as Sharon Wu, provided a summary of the proceedings and responded to inquiries from the press. Wu and other dignitaries from the Government of the Republic of China paid a visit to the newly opened Central American Bank for Economic Integration (CABEI) Country Office in Taipei on 22 July 2021.

Rebecca Fatima Sta Maria, CEO of the APEC Secretariat, and Sharon Wu, Director of International Affairs of the Ministry of Foreign Affairs, signed a memorandum in November 2021, donating NT$1.5 million on behalf of the government to help APEC promote projects involving economic and technical cooperation. Sharon Wu was a member of the group that met in Washington, D.C., in March 2022 to explore Taiwan's increased engagement in the United Nations system and other international forums.

=== Poland ===
Since 4 August 2023, Wu has served as the representative of Taiwan to Poland. On 14 November 2023, during the ReBuild Ukraine 2nd International Exhibition and Conference in Warsaw, Sharon Wu signs six memorandums of understanding on a variety of themes, including care and counseling for women and children and city-to-city exchanges.

"We also want to take this chance to express our gratitude to the Polish Center for International Aid (PCPM) for helping to make the delivery process easier. Thanks to their collaboration, this project perfectly captures the essence of Taiwan Stands with Ukraine." Regarding the ongoing collaboration between the PCPM and the Taipei Representative Office in Warsaw in providing humanitarian aid in Poland and Ukraine, Sharon Wu provided additional context.

== Personal life ==
Jason C. C. Lien, Sharon Wu's spouse, became the first "wife secretary" of the Ministry of Foreign Affairs when he took over as director of Treaty Law after serving as director of the Ministry of Foreign Affairs office in Edinburgh.

Diplomatic posts
Preceded by Bob L. J. Chen	Representative of the Republic of China to Poland; 4 August 2023 – present	Succeeded by Incumbent
