= Irpin =

City in Kyiv Oblast, Ukraine

Irpin Ірпiнь
- City
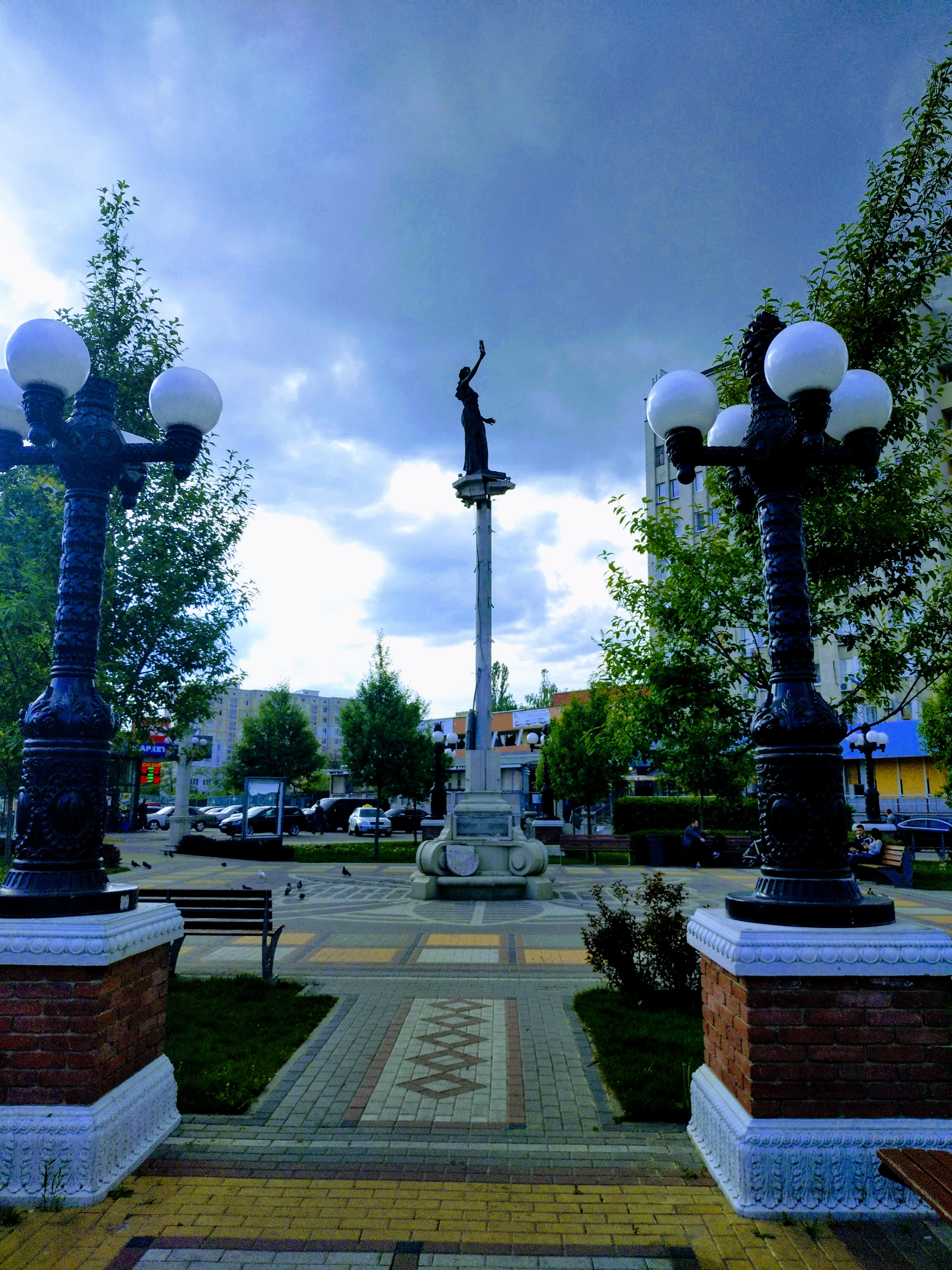
- A statue in a square in Irpin

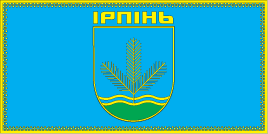
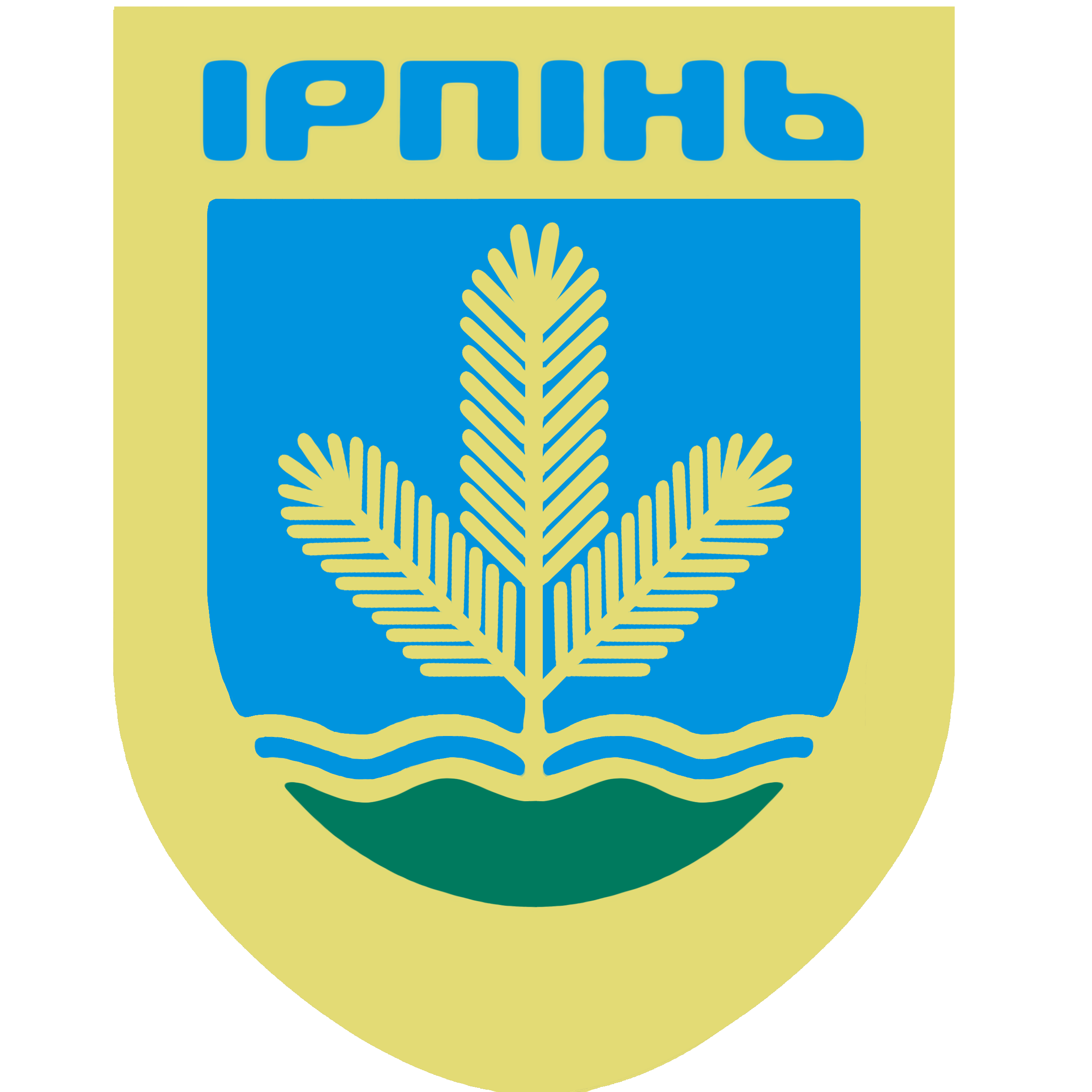
- Flag Coat of arms
- Interactive map of Irpin
- Location within Kyiv Oblast Location within Ukraine
- Coordinates: 50°31′00″N 30°15′00″E
- Country: Ukraine
- Oblast: Kyiv Oblast
- Raion: Bucha Raion
- Hromada: Irpin urban hromada
- Founded: 1899
- City rights: 1956

Area
  - City: 110.83 km^{2} (42.79 sq mi)
- Elevation: 119 m (390 ft)

Population (2022)
  - City: 65,167
  - Estimate (2024): 63,411
  - Density: 587.99/km^{2} (1,522.9/sq mi)
  - Metro: 100,509^{1}
- Time zone: UTC+2 (EET)
  - Summer (DST): UTC+3 (EEST)
- Postal code: 08200 — 08279
- Area code: +380 4597
- Website: imr.gov.ua
- ^{1} The metro population for Irpin are the statistics for the whole Irpin Municipality.

Irpin (Ukrainian: Ірпінь, IPA: [irˈpʲinʲ]) is a city on the Irpin River in Bucha Raion, Kyiv Oblast, northern Ukraine. It is located next to the capital Kyiv, on the Irpin River. Irpin hosts the administration of Irpin urban hromada, or administrative division. The city had an estimated population of 65,167 (2022 estimate) which makes it the largest city in Bucha Raion.

There were several villages on the site from the 17th century onwards, with the city being built around the railway station that was constructed in 1899.

In the battle of Irpin during the 2022 Russian invasion of Ukraine, 70% of the city was damaged, including the House of Culture, which had been built by the community in 1954. In June 2023, the city's mayor reported that most people had already returned, along with around 25,000 internally displaced people.

== History ==
=== Early history ===
The villages of Romanivka and Liubka stood on the site of Irpin in the 17th century. In the 19th century, the villages (or khutirs) of Severynivka, then Rudnia and Stoianka appeared.

Irpin was formed in 1899 as a passing loop, during construction of the Kyiv–Kovel railway line. Railway workers founded the town near the railway line, along with other localities such as Bucha and Vorzel. The city's name (along with the settlement of Vorzel) was chosen due to its location on the Irpin River.

=== 20th century ===
In February 1918 Irpin was the site of battles between the Sich Riflemen and Bolshevik troops. Later during that year it saw fighting between the Black Sea Kish and forces of the Hetmanate.

From 26 July 1941, from the Battle of Kyiv onwards, it was occupied by the Wehrmacht until November 1943, when Kyiv was recaptured. Most of its Jewish population were murdered in either Babi Yar or other massacres by the Nazis.

In 1954, the community of Irpin built the Irpin Central House of Culture.

In 1956, Irpin's status was changed to that of a "city of raion (district) subordination," subordinate to the Kyiv-Sviatoshyn Raion.

On 30 December 1962, the Presidium of the Verkhovna Rada of the Ukrainian SSR issued a decree changing the status of Irpin to that of a "city of oblast subordination," thus being directly subordinate to the oblast authorities rather than the city administration housed within the city. Also mentioned within the decree were the inclusion of the urban-type settlements of Bucha (a city since 2007), Vorzel, Hostomel, and Kotsiubynske within the city limits.

=== 21st century ===
Until 18 July 2020, Irpin was incorporated as a city of oblast significance and the center of Irpin Municipality, which also included the urban-type settlement of Hostomel, Kotsiubynske, and Vorzel. In July 2020, as part of the administrative reform of Ukraine, which reduced the number of raions of Kyiv Oblast to seven, Irpin Municipality was merged into Bucha Raion.

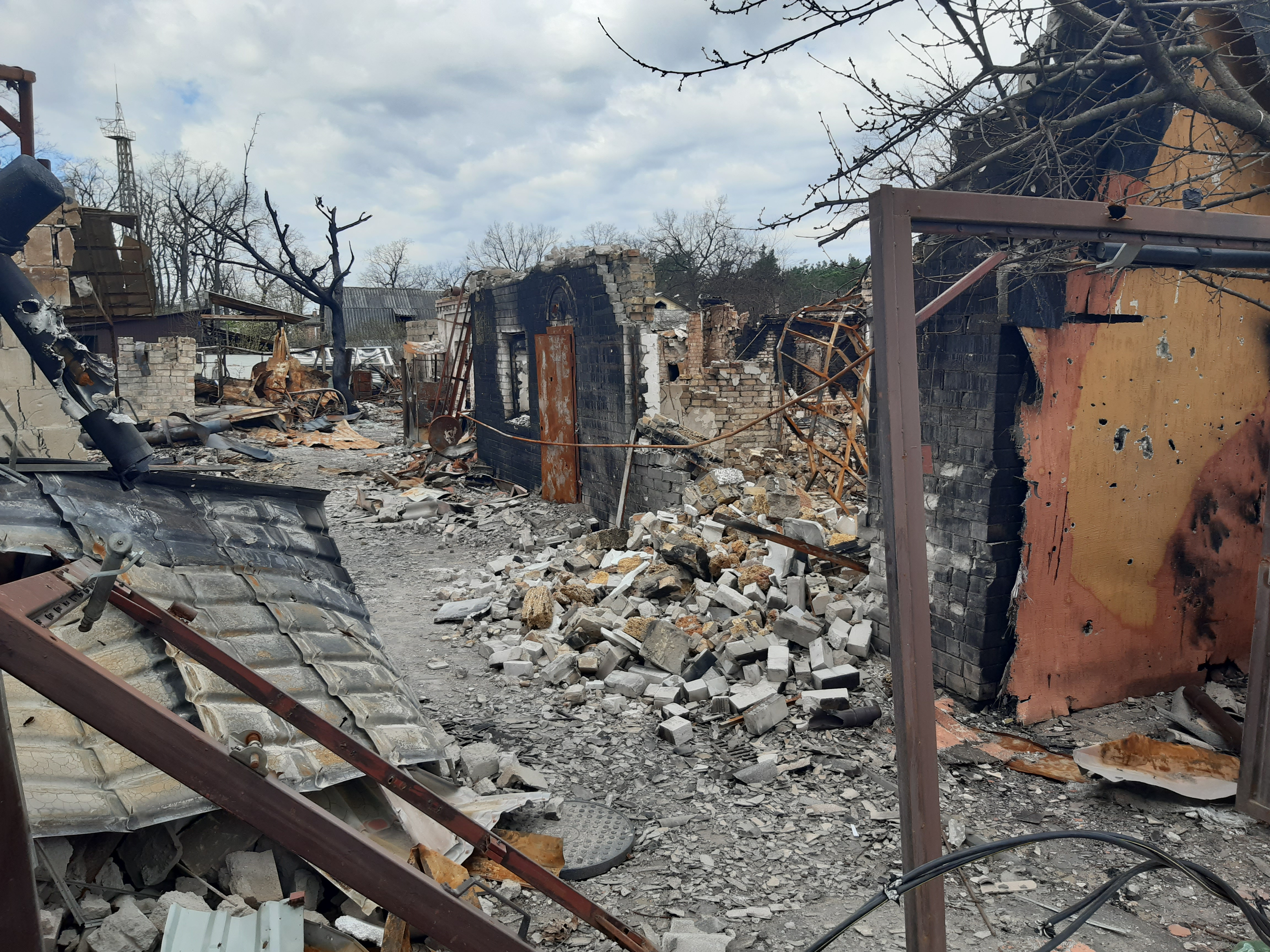
Destroyed Irpin after the Battle of Irpin

==== 2022 Russian invasion ====
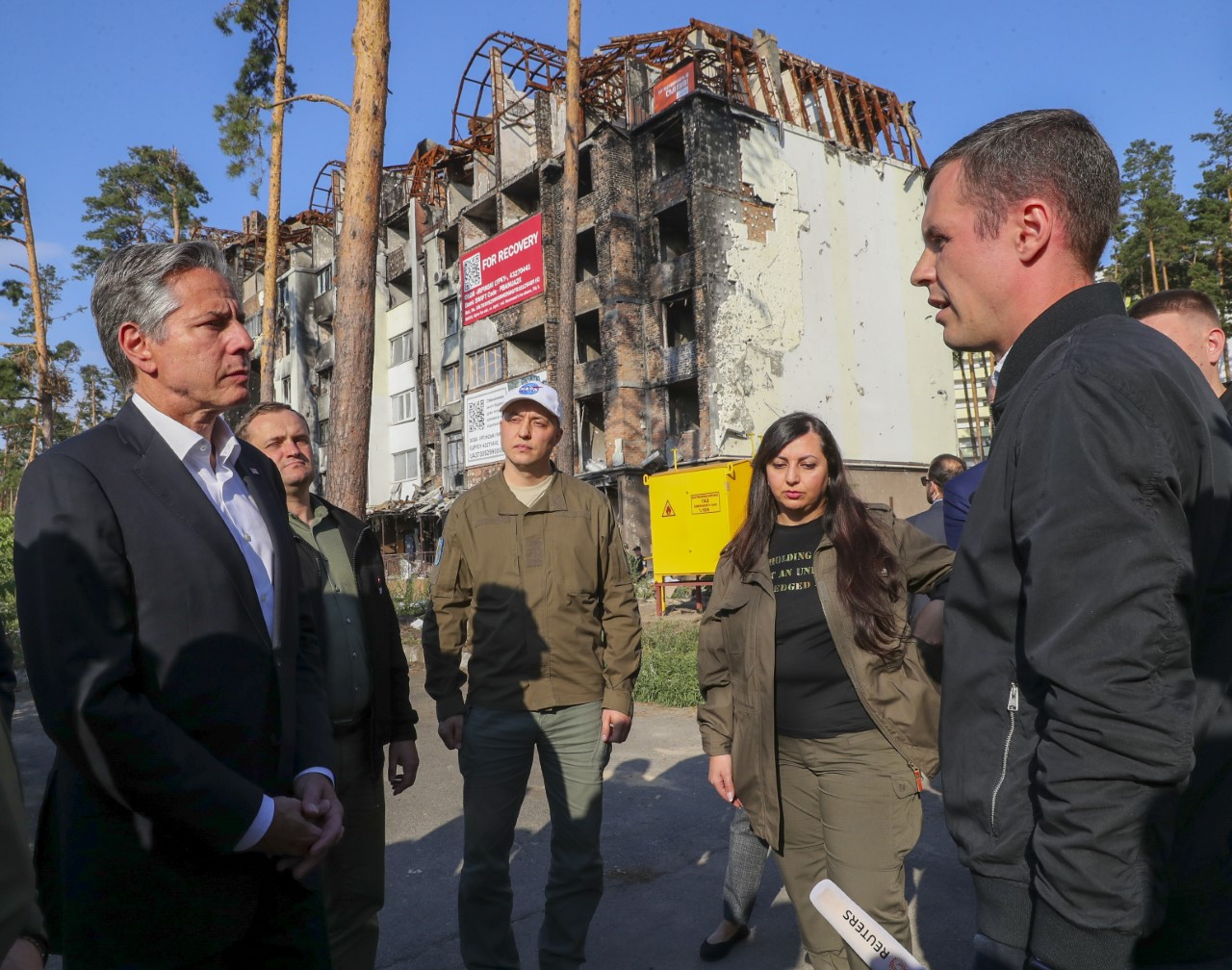
U.S. Secretary of State Antony Blinken visited Irpin on 8 September 2022

During the 2022 Russian invasion of Ukraine, Irpin became the site of a battlefield engagement during the Kyiv offensive. Russian forces took the Hostomel Airport in the north of the city to facilitate an advance southwards, around Kyiv. The city was shelled by Russian artillery while the Ukrainians were able to repel and destroy multiple forces attempting to move into the town. According to Human Rights Watch, on 6 March 2022, Russian forces bombarded an intersection on a road of Irpin which was used by civilians to flee. Later in March, the House of Culture was very badly damaged by Russian shelling.

==== Post-invasion ====
By 24 March 2022, 80% of the city was recaptured from Russian occupants by Ukrainian Armed Forces. On the same day, Irpin received the title Hero City of Ukraine by decree of the President of Ukraine, Volodymyr Zelenskyy. On 29 March 2022 The New York Times reported that President Zelenskyy had announced that Irpin had been liberated. On 30 March 2022, the mayor of Irpin, Oleksandr Markushin, said that the Russian military had killed more than 300 civilians and 50 servicemen in the city.

Around 76% of the city had been damaged by the Russian invasion. In March 2022, a Ukrainian urban renewal company called Innovations and Reconstruction for Societies, known as the Irpin Reconstruction Summit (IRS) was launched, aiming to "Build Back Better", was launched. Hundreds of architects, engineers, and urban planners responded to a call by the Investment Council of Irpen to help rebuild the town, with the goal of restoring social and critical infrastructure such as schools and lighting. International architects and planners include Stefano Boeri from Italy, Christian Wittig from Chile, and Hiroki Matsuura, of the Netherlands (of Japanese origin). By March 2023, around 10 projects had been approved, including the House of Culture.

On 25 June 2023 the mayor reported that most people had already returned, along with an additional "almost 25,000 internally displaced persons, mostly from the east".

On 24 August 2023, the Ruta Kindergarten was opened under a collaborative project by Lithuania and Taiwan. The IRS reconstruction of the city continues, with international assistance.

== Governance and demographics ==
Irpin hosts the administration of Irpin urban hromada, one of the hromadas of Ukraine, with a population of 47,524 people.

As of the 2001 Ukrainian census, Irpin had a population of 40,593 inhabitants. At the time, the population was overwhelmingly Ukrainian, but sizeable Russian, Belarusian, Polish, and Moldovan minorities reside in the city. The exact ethnic composition was as follows:

Ethnic groups in Irpin
	percent
Ukrainians	89.17%
Russians	8.70%
Belarusians	0.59%
Poles	0.45%
Moldovans	0.24%
Jews	0.13%
others	0.72%

In 2022, the population was estimated to number 65,167 (2022 estimate). On 25 June 2023 the mayor reported that around 85% of inhabitants had returned, after fleeing the city during the Russian occupation, along with an additional 25,000 displaced persons, mostly from eastern Ukraine.

In 2024, the population was estimated as 63,411.

== House of Culture ==
The Irpin Central House of Culture (also known as simply House of Culture) was established by the local community in 1954, and was one of the first post-World War II cultural institutions. It was designed by architect Zoya Brod, in Soviet monumental classical style, with the entrance, reception area, stairs, and foyer were elaborately decorated with stucco. Located at 183 Sobornaya Street, Irpin, its "bulky" name is a reflection of the Soviet era in which it was established. The administration of the brick and tile factory at nearby Bucha made the plans to construct the building in summer 1952, and the workers funded and constructed it at themselves. The building contained a 484-seat auditorium, a lobby, dressing room, and choreography hall, along with vocal and drama classrooms. The official opening of the distinctive sky-blue building was in autumn 1954. By 1955, it was host to 15 children's and adult amateur creative clubs. Its two concert halls became a centre for activities such as creative workshops, musical concerts, performance art classes for young people, and various events, and a key part of Irpin's identity and social life as well as an architectural monument, with its striking Doric columns at the front.

Famous Ukrainian artists, including Olga Sumska, Ada Rohovtseva, Bohdan Stupka, Anatolii Khostikoiev, Hryhorii Chapkis, Serhii Prytula, and Volodymyr Hryshko performed there over the years.

The interiors and ceilings of the House of Culture were badly damaged by Russian artillery on 17 March 2022. The facade remained standing, marked by the bullets, but most of the interior was destroyed. After the Russians left the city, the remaining facade and ruined walls became important symbols of resistance. They featured in a music video ("2step") by Ed Sheeran in collaboration with the Ukrainian band Antytila. Lithuanian pianist Darius Mažintas gave a performance outdoors in front of the House of Culture. The Kalush Orchestra, who won Eurovision 2022, filmed their music video "Stefania" at the site. The walls of the House of Culture were decorated with sunflowers to symbolise the resilience and resistance of the city's inhabitants.

In April 2022, Australian artist and documentary filmmaker George Gittoes and his wife and collaborator Hellen Rose visited the building to document the damage on video and in drawings, while they were living in Kyiv and filming stories about the effect of the war on ordinary Ukrainians. They were assisted by local woman Kate Parunova. During their stay, Gittoes and Ukrainian artist Ave Libertatemaveamor collaborated to produce a huge mural titled Kiss of Death, on the outside wall of the building. The kiss refers to the portrayal of Putin "as a hideous insect-like creature clumsily kissing his contortionist lover, grossly 'feeding off each other'". Gittoes' and Rose's 2023 film, Ukraine Guernica: Art Not War, features the House of Culture.

The Irpin Reconstruction Summit has commissioned a plan by architects to reconstruct the building. The design, drawn up under the leadership of architect Maksym Detkovskyi in July 2022, uses the existing facade and entrance, integrated with new, modern elements, including a three-storey new wing. It is planned to situate the restored facade in a glass cube, "as a symbol of culture that cannot be taken away from the Ukrainian people". Surviving brickwork will be cleaned, as a tribute to the historical roots of the building.

In September 2024, UNESCO and ICCROM conducted field training on cultural property damage and risk assessment, using the House of Culture as a case study. Save the Spot, a not-for-profit fund-raising organisation founded by two Russian women who live in the UK, has partnered with many cultural organisations in Ukraine, including the House of Culture, to help the damaged preserve and restore cultural heritage.

The Kyiv Regional Military Administration's Department of Culture and Tourism has created a digitised version of the damaged building, by taking 2,000 photographs from the ground and drones.

== Economy ==
Irpin is known as a resort area located in a forest zone. It is also a centre of industry, including production of bricks, machine building and peat extraction.

There were 22 industrial manufacturers operating in the Irpin region, and nearly 1,000 enterprises of various forms of ownership.

The agricultural sector of Irpin provides Kyiv with vegetables.

== Sport and recreation ==
The city once hosted several professional football clubs, among which are Dynamo Irpin (later known as FC Ros Bila Tserkva) and Nafkom-Akademiya (later known as FC Nafkom Brovary).

In the summer of 2016 a newly-built small city stadium was opened in the city. After being damaged by the Russian occupation, there were plans to restore it. /Well-known Ukrainian footballer Andriy Shevchenko has assisted with fundraising efforts via the United24 fundraising platform.

== Education ==
- University of the State Fiscal Service of Ukraine (formerly State Tax Academy)
- School of Economy of the National Agrarian University
- Evangelical Bible Seminary

== Notable people ==
- Ukrainian mixed martial artist Yaroslav Amosov was born in Irpin
- Soviet writer Nikolay Nosov spent his childhood in Irpin
- Ukrainian photographer Yuri Kosin works in Irpin
- Ukrainian singer LOBODA was born in Irpin

== Sister cities ==
Irpin's sister cities are:

- Milwaukee, United States
- Borna, Germany
- Guernica, Spain
- Syracuse, New York, United States

== Gallery ==
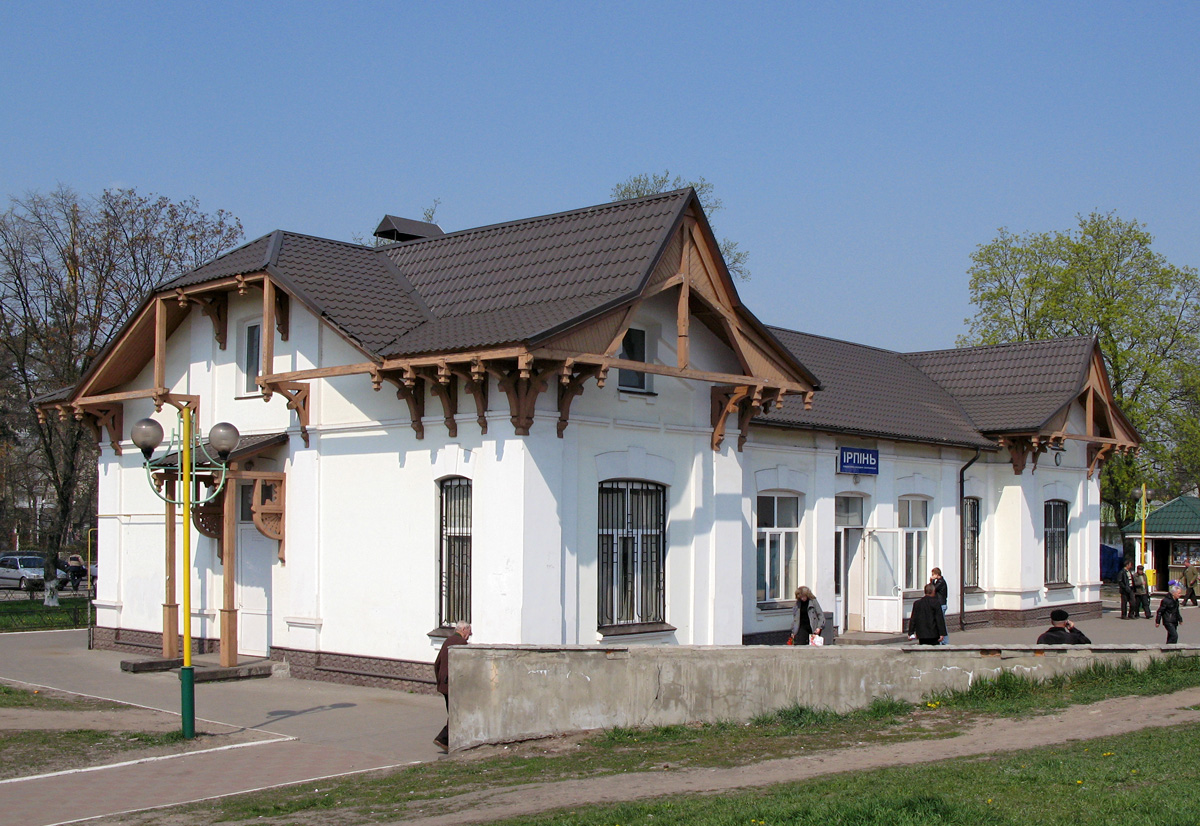
Irpin railway station

City hall

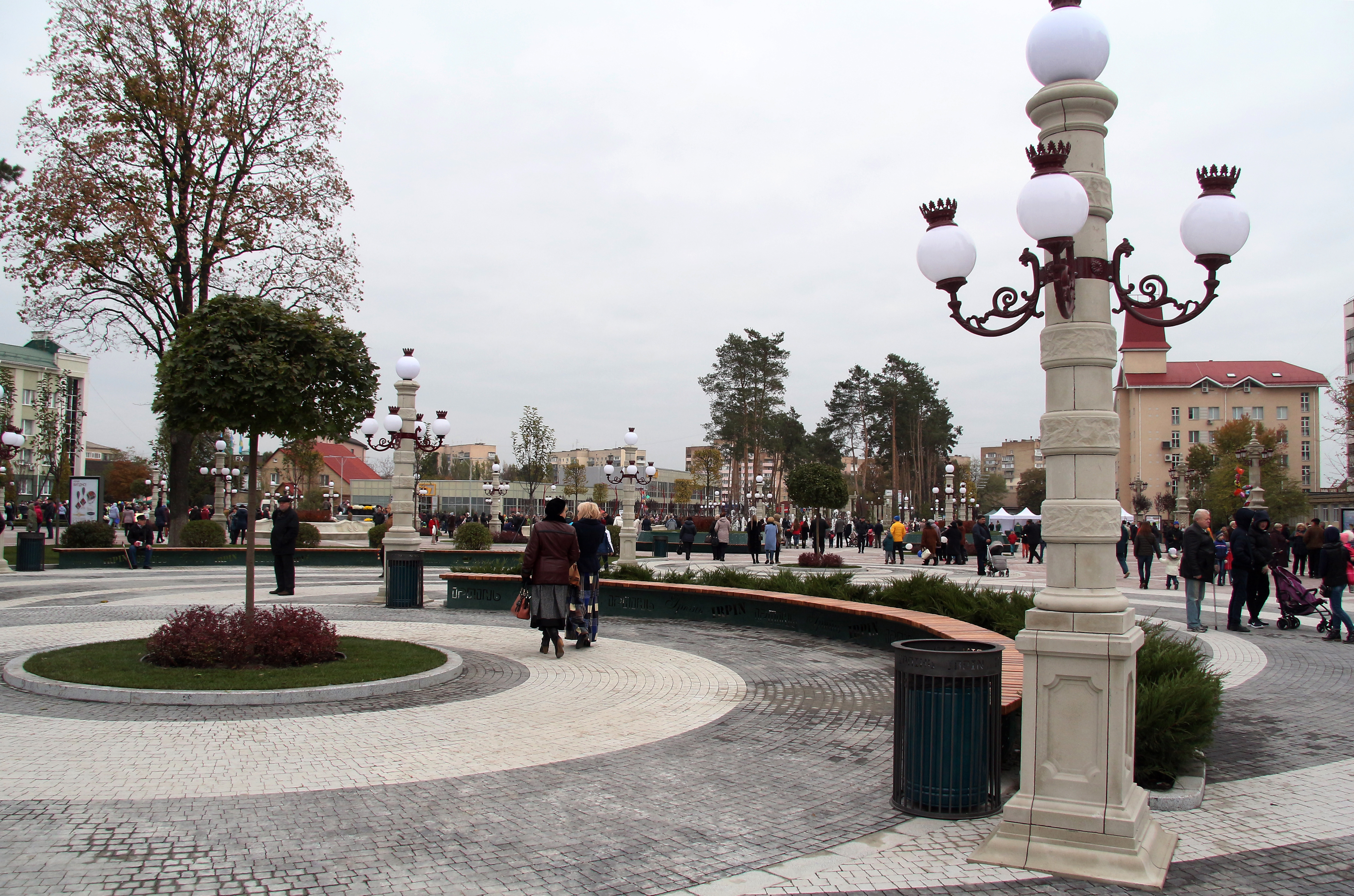
Irpin central square

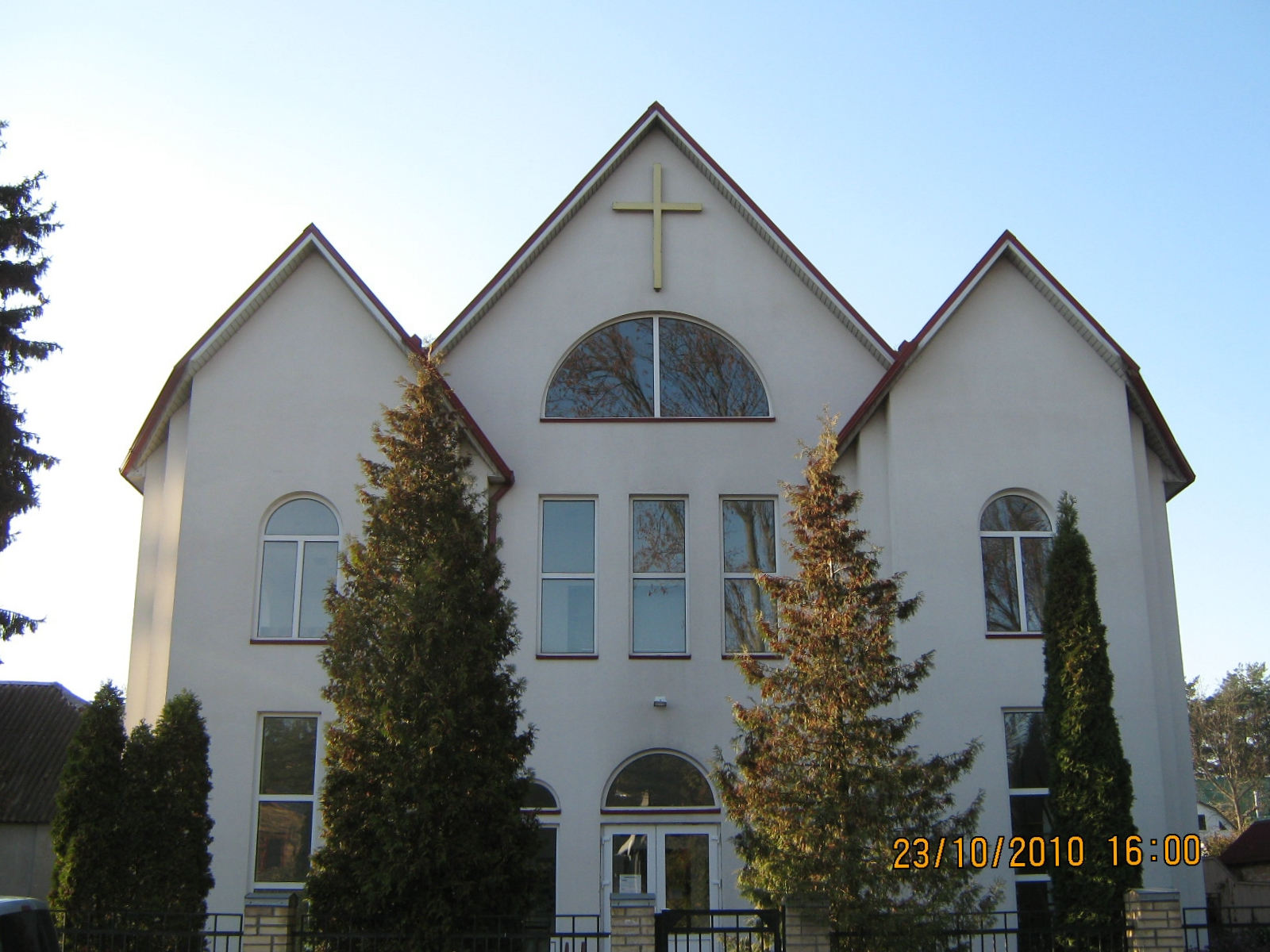
Baptist church

St. Nicholas Church

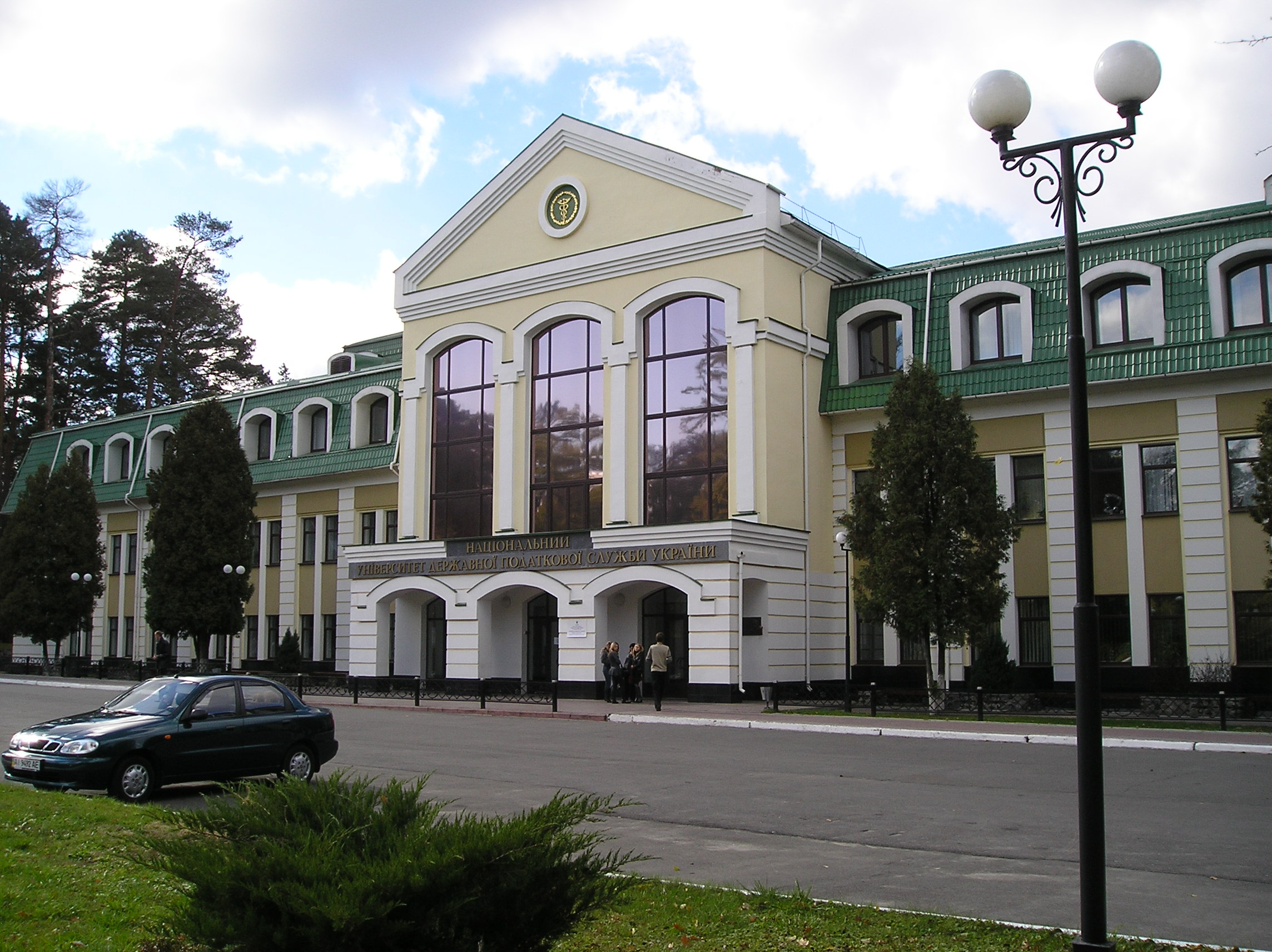
State Tax Academy of Ukraine

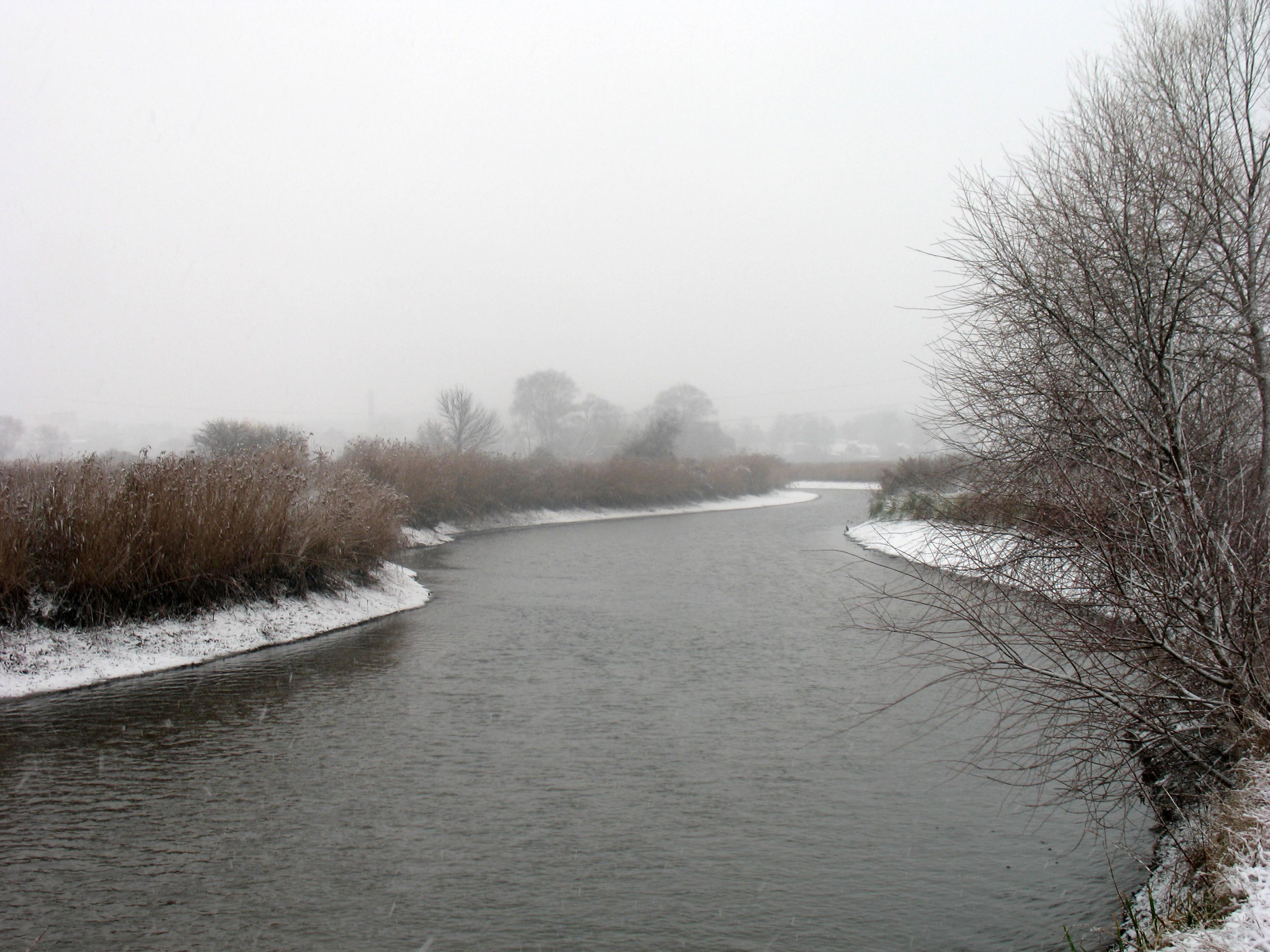
Irpin River

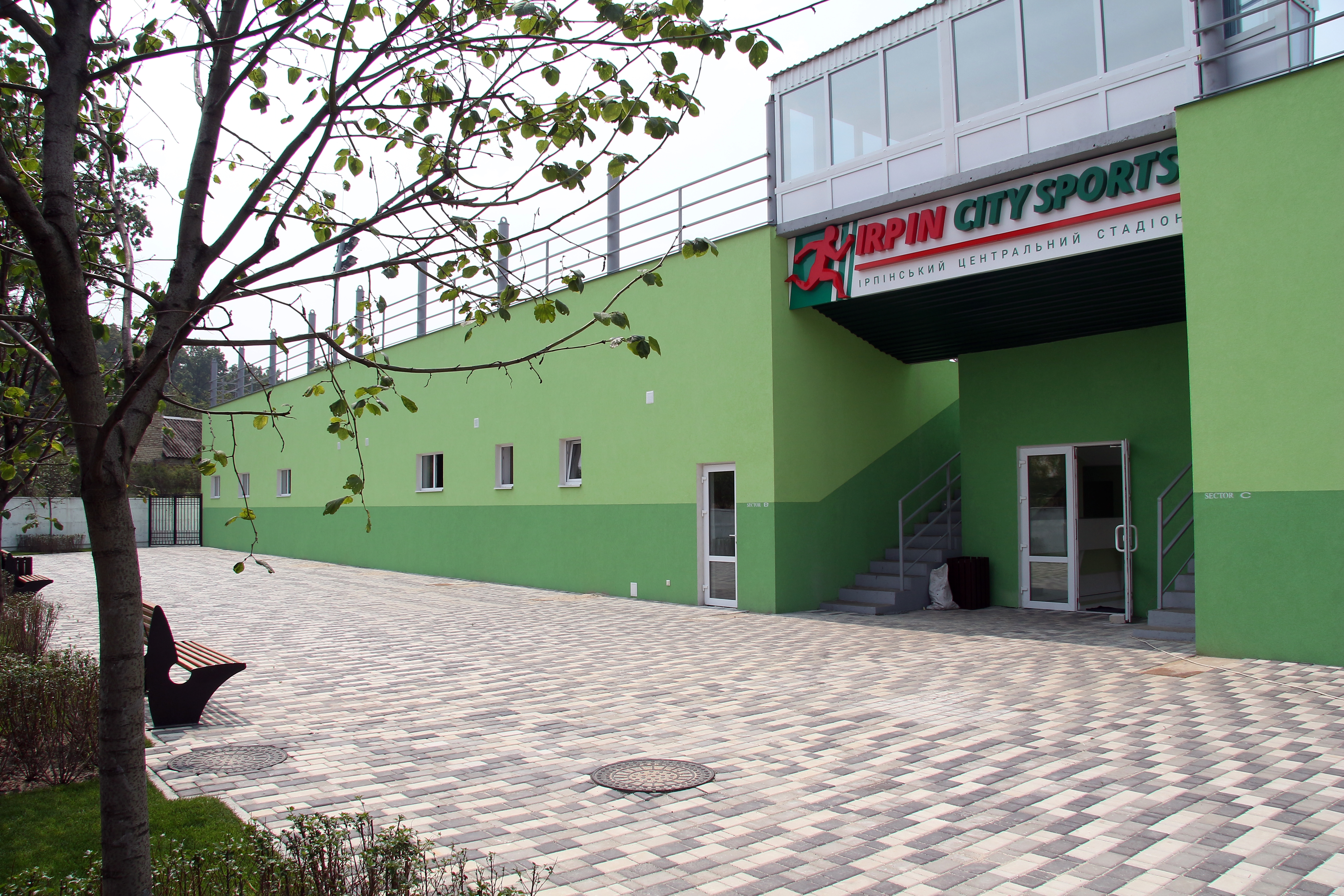
Central stadium

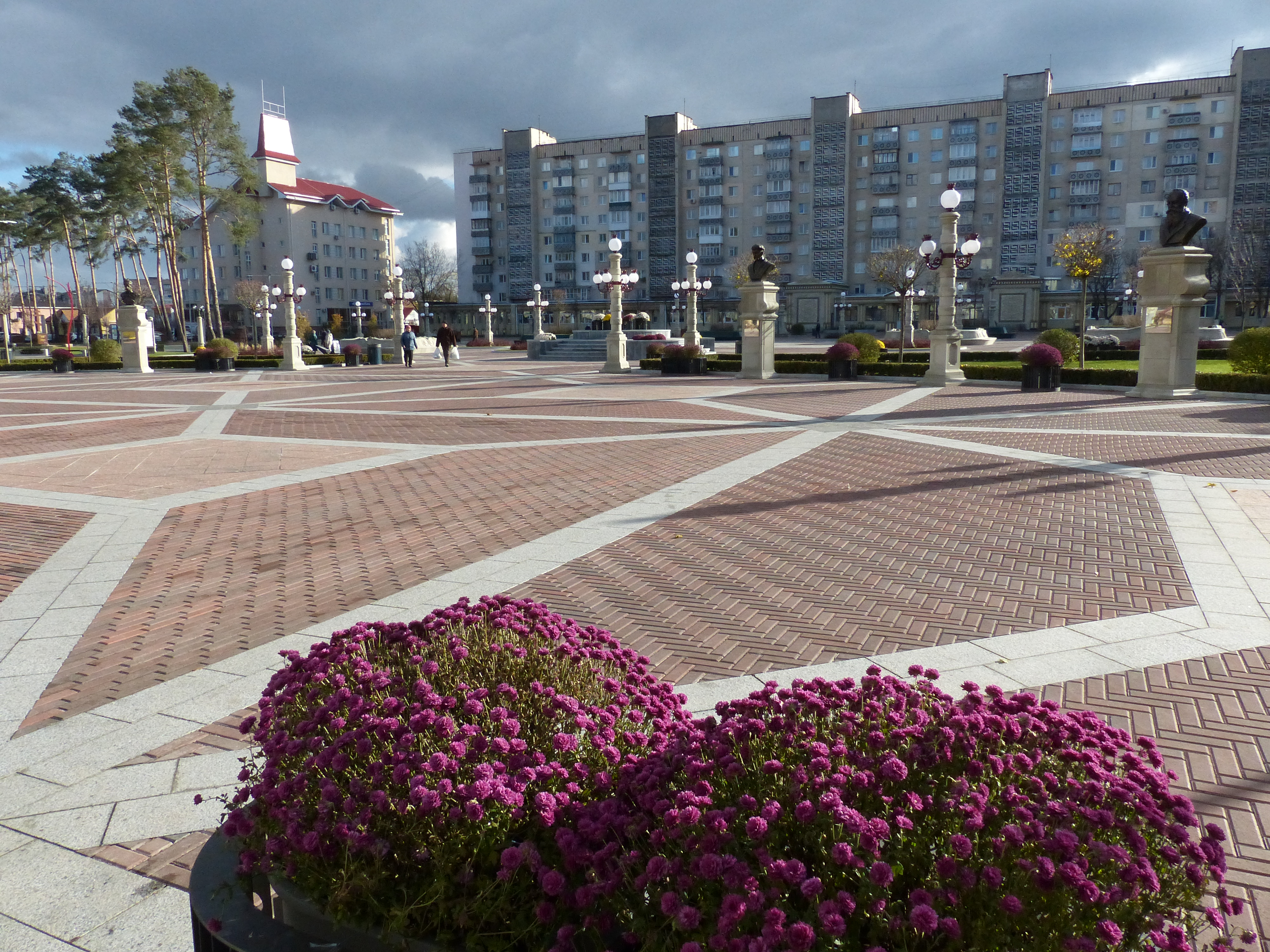
The central square of Irpin

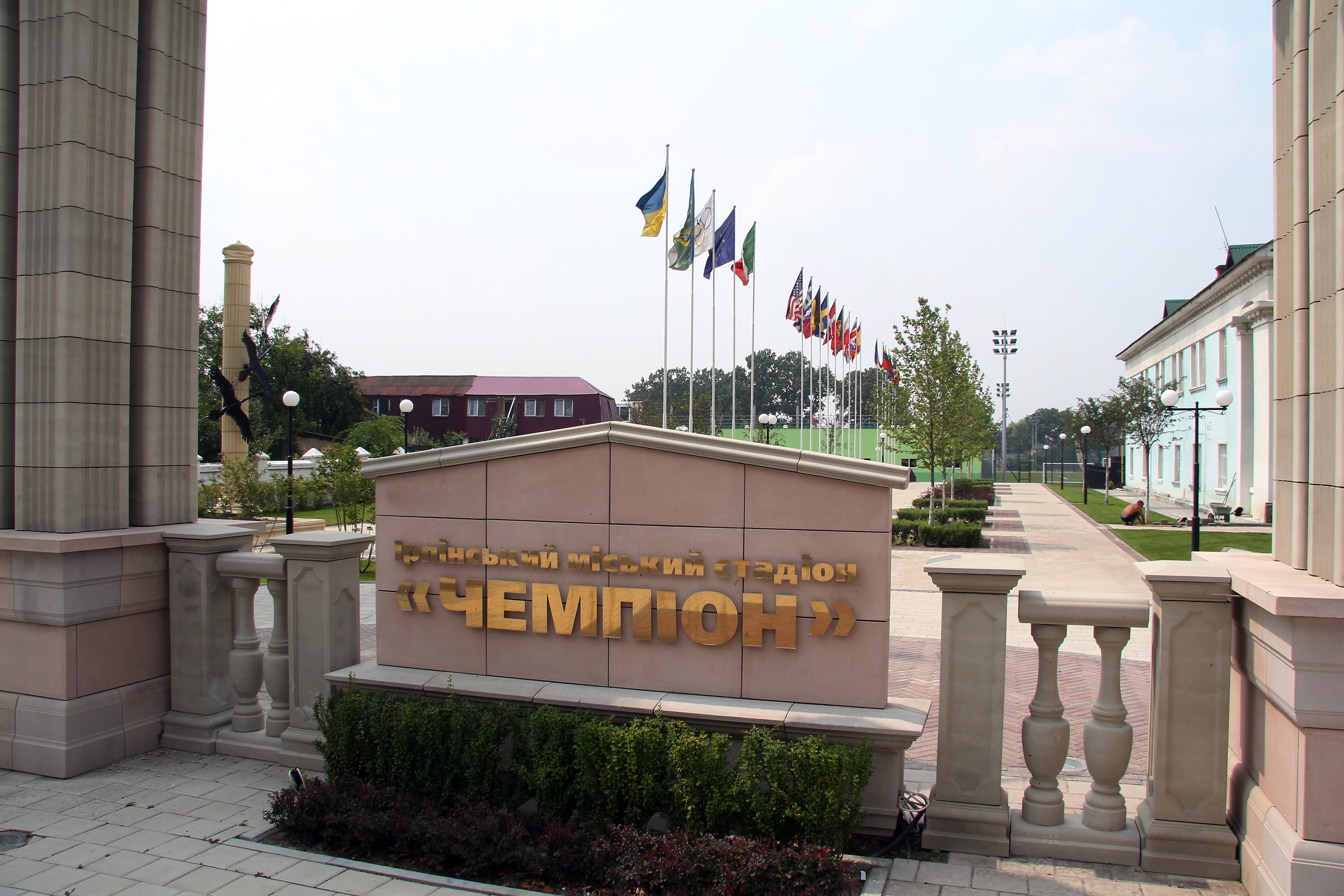
Irpin Stadium "Champion"

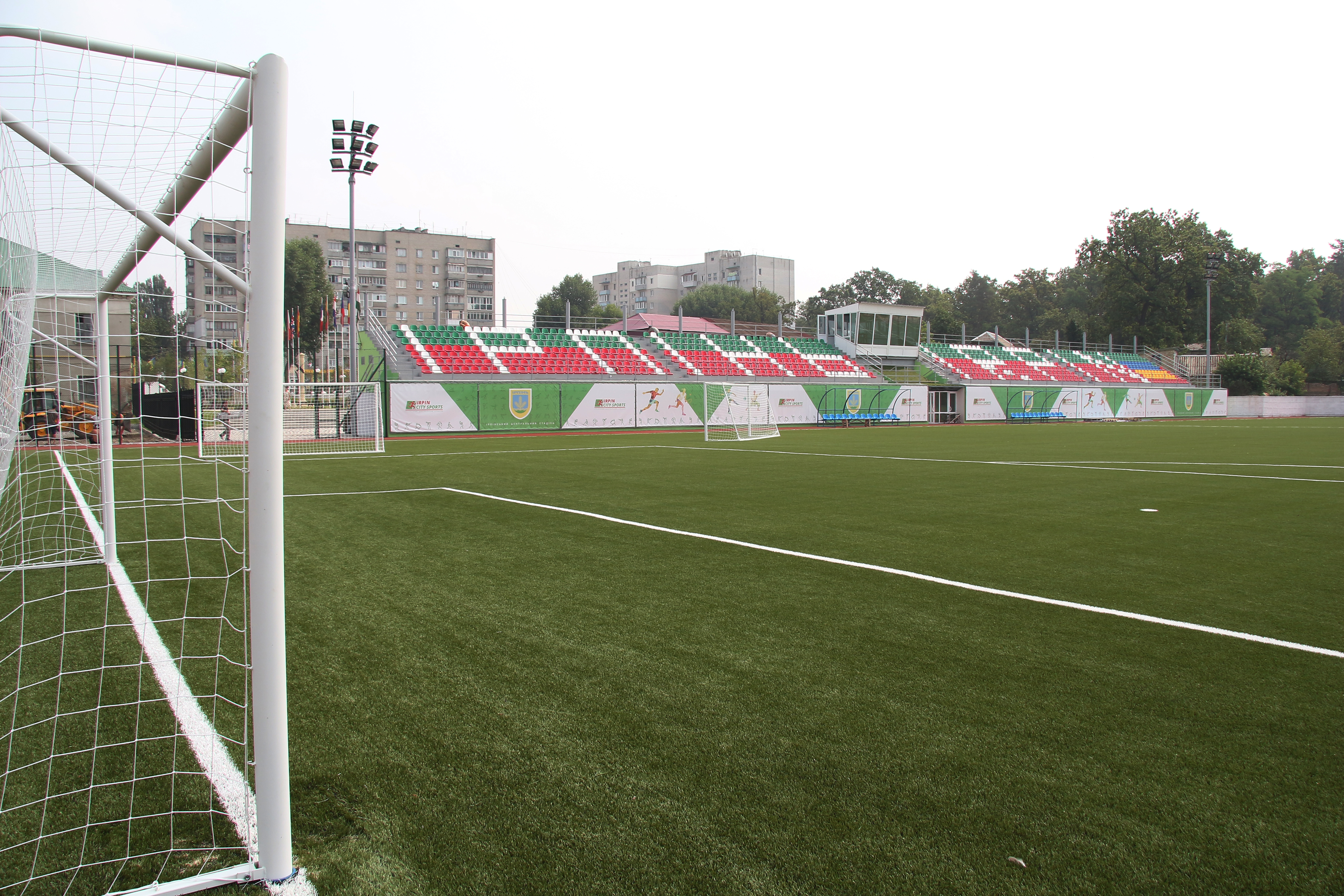
Irpin Stadium "Champion"

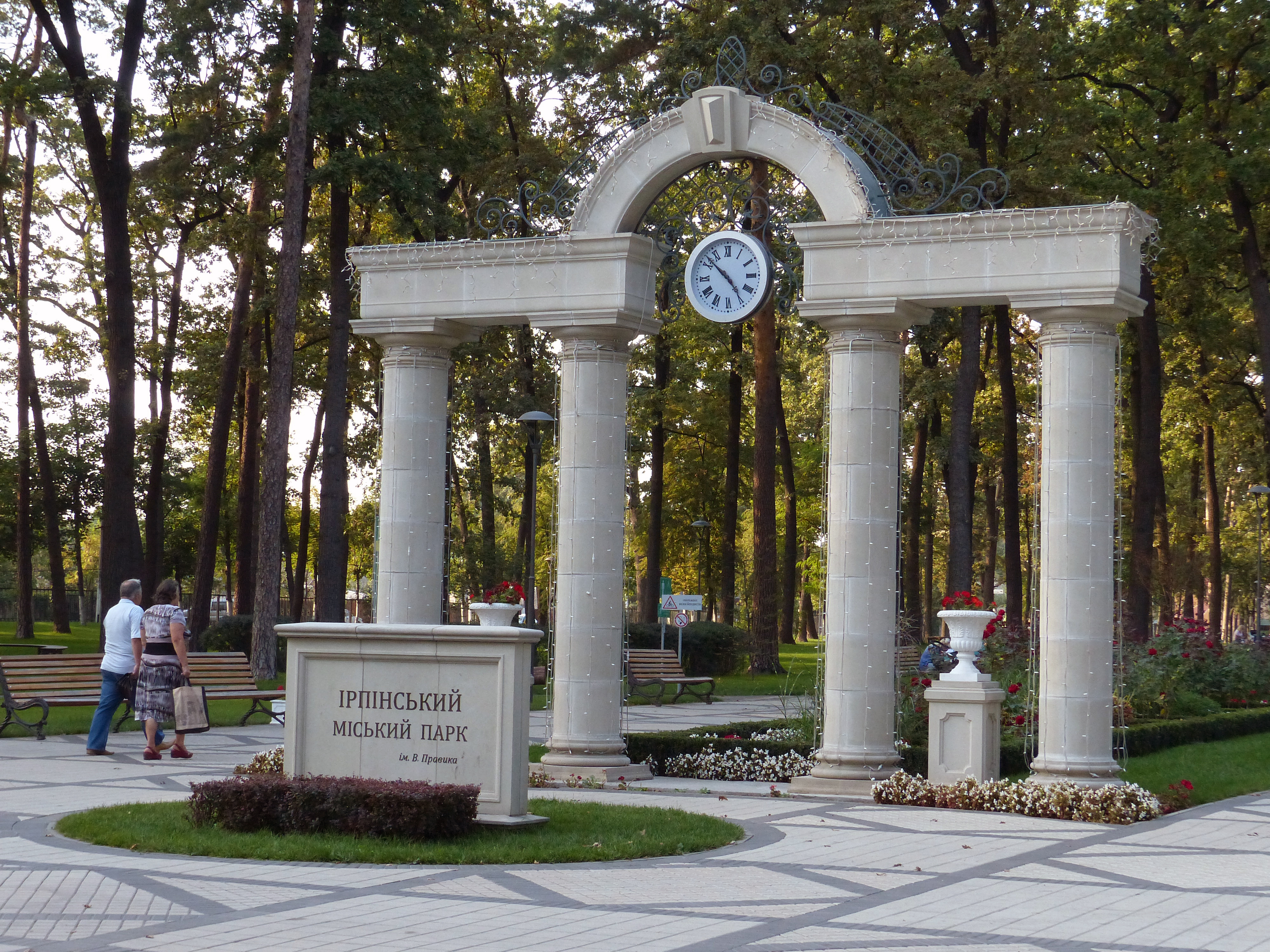
Irpin city park

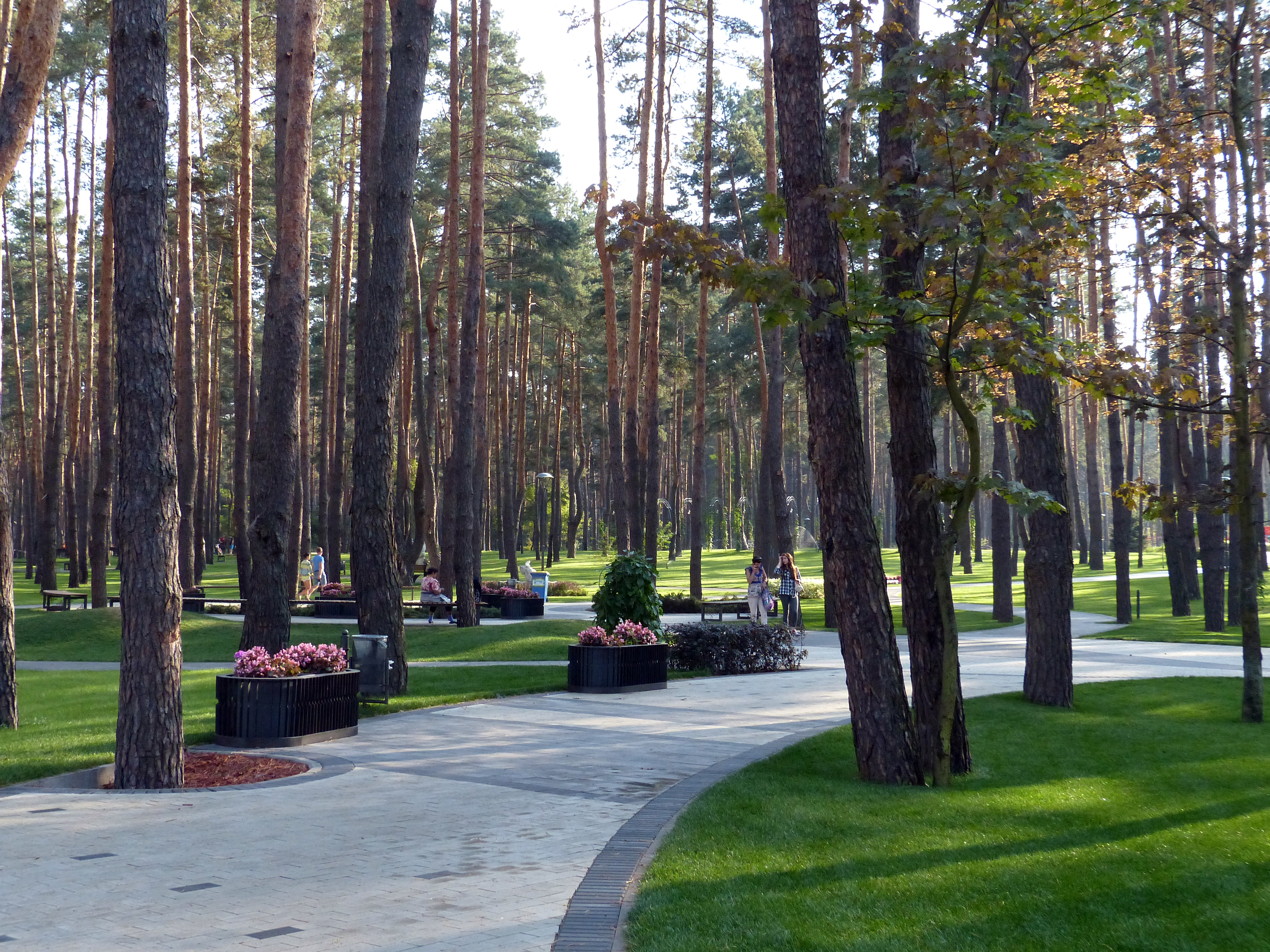
Central Park

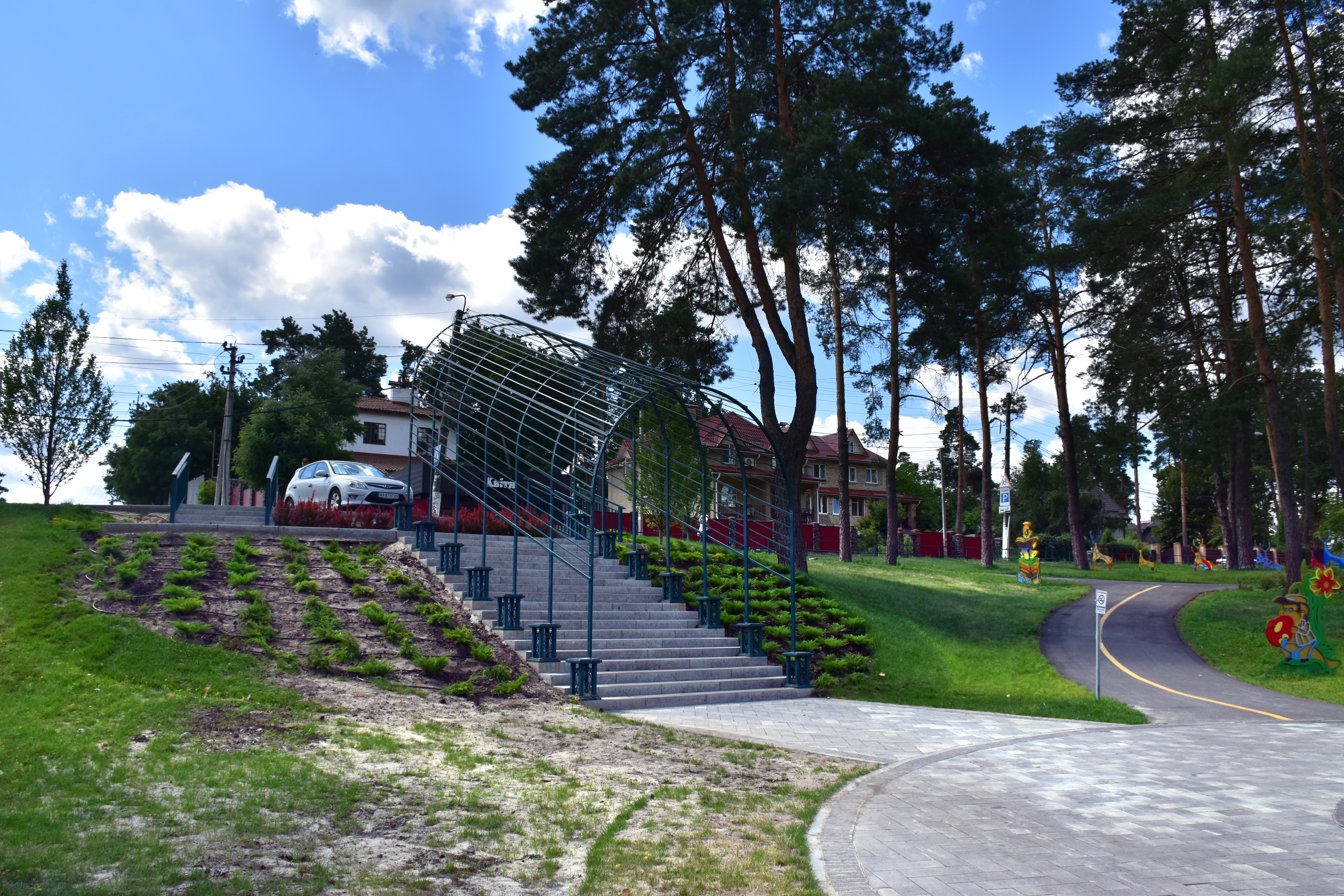
Neznaiko Park

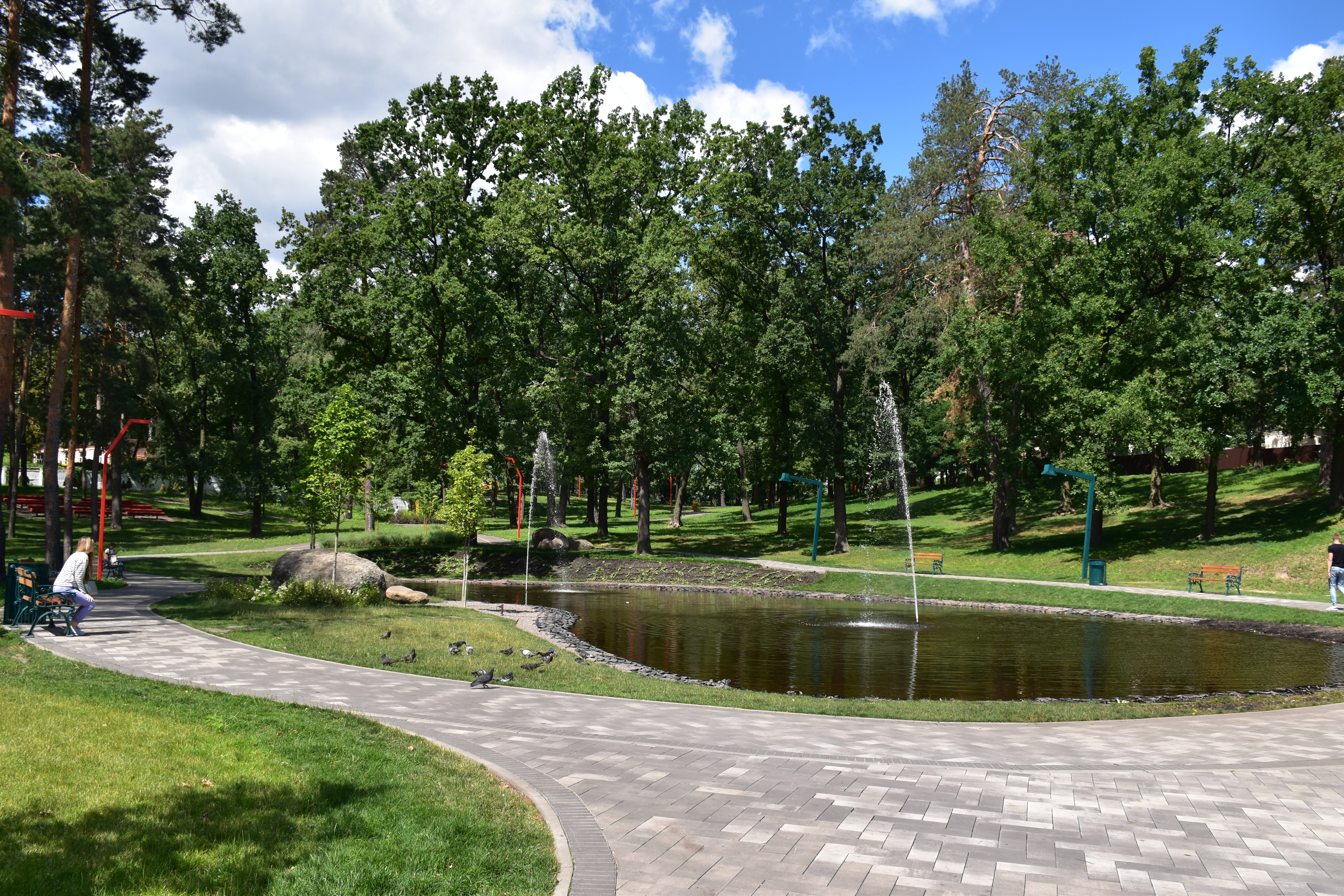
Neznaiko Park

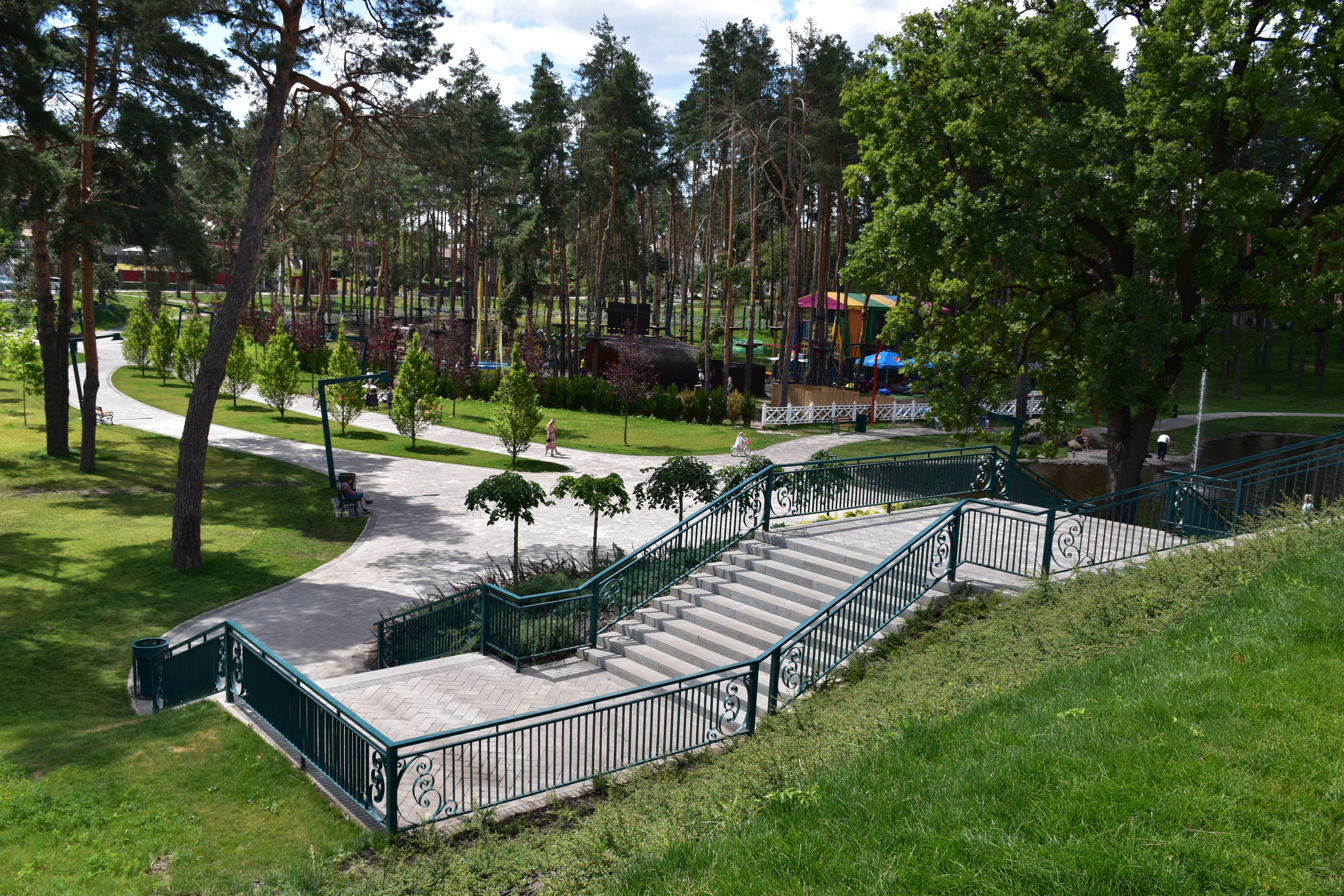
Neznaiko Park
