= Poland–Taiwan relations =

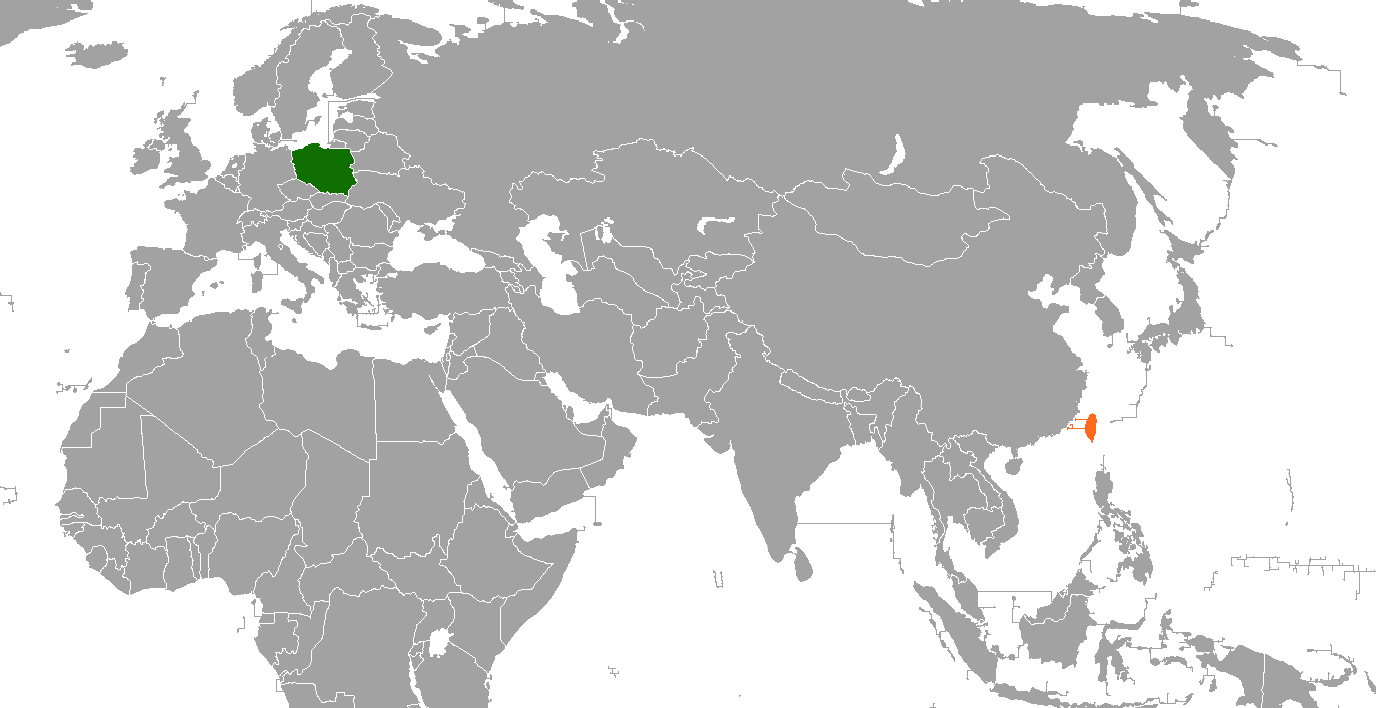
- Poland: Taiwan

Diplomatic mission
- Polish Office in Taipei: Taipei Representative Office in Poland

Envoy
- Director Cyryl Kozaczewski: Representative Sharon S. N. Wu

Poland–Taiwan relations refers to the bilateral relations between the Republic of Poland and the Republic of China (Taiwan).

Under the circumstance of the One China policy, Poland, like a majority of the nations in the world, does not have official diplomatic ties with the Republic of China on Taiwan, and only recognizes the People's Republic of China as the sole representative of China, however they do not take a position or recognize Taiwan as part of that China. Nonetheless, relationships between two countries have expanded dramatically, and since Poland transformed into a market economy after 1990, Taiwan has been one of largest Asian investors to Poland.

Despite this, they have their representative offices in respective countries. Poland has a representative office in Taipei while Taiwan has a representative office in Warsaw.

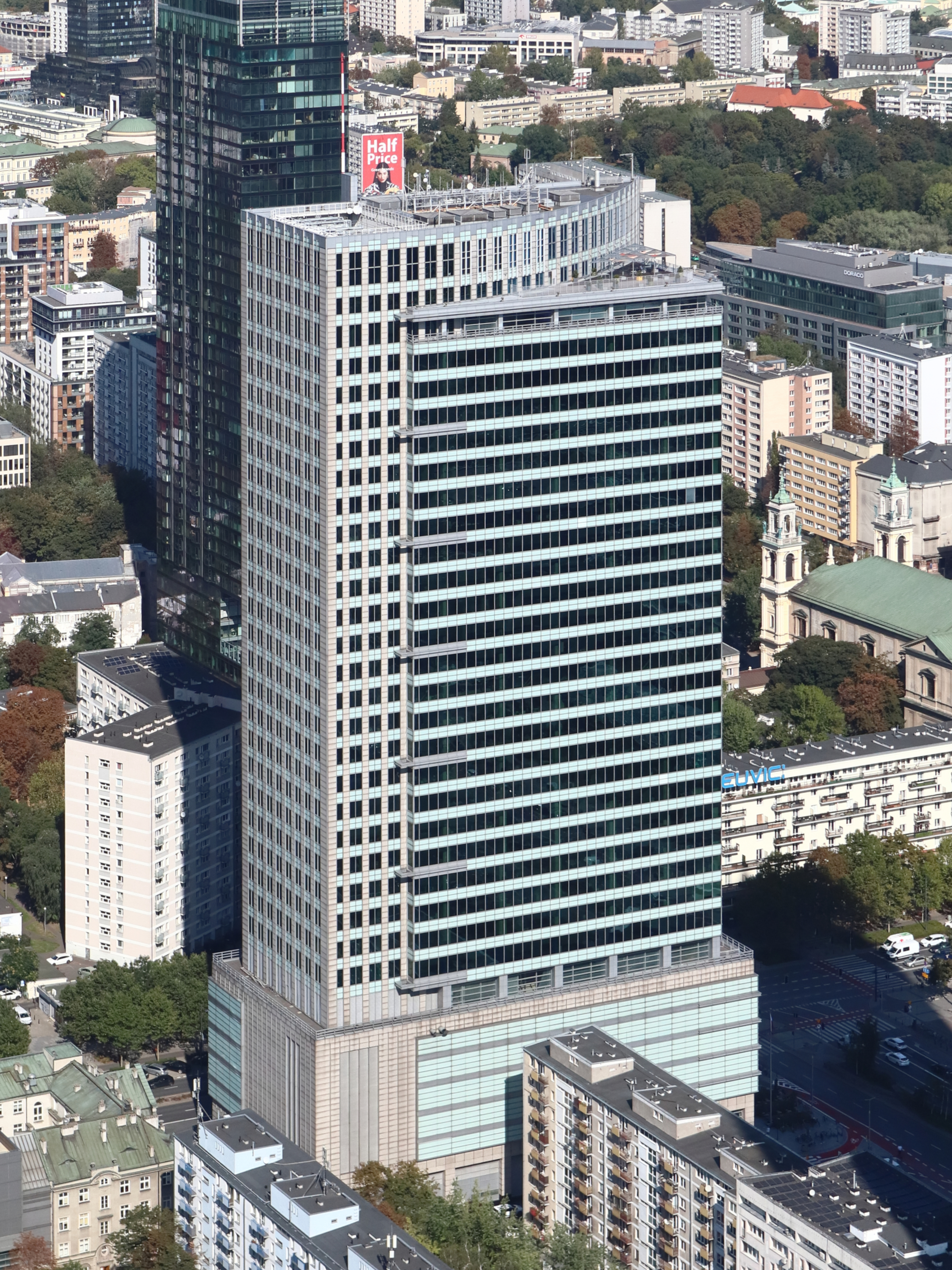
Seat of the Taipei Representative Office in Poland

== History ==
Diplomatic relations between Poland and China began in 1919. In 1929, the Treaty of Friendship, Trade, and Navigation between China and Poland was signed in Nanking to strengthen and develop relations. In March 1929, a Polish legation was established in Shanghai at the Government of the Republic of China in Nanking, which, after the Japanese aggression in 1937, was moved together with the Chinese government to Chongqing. In 1942, when China and Poland became official and formal allies against the Axis powers, the Polish legation was raised to the rank of embassy, and Alfred Poniński served as ambassador until 1945. When communist parties took power in both countries, diplomatic relations between the Second Polish Republic and the Republic of China were replaced by relations between the Polish People's Republic and the People's Republic of China. Although Jan Fryling, who headed the former legation, was allowed to remain in the territories retained by the Republic of China to assist Poles living in Shanghai, where he was met with kindness from the Chinese government and officials at various levels.

=== Modern relations ===
Since the end of communism in 1989, Poland and Taiwan had started embracing a stronger and advocating tie. Being allies of the United States and have enjoyed a large decree of success with democratic ideals, the two nations seek to tie stronger.

Several economic agreements have been signed between two nations, notably the double taxation agreement and recently solar energy agreement.

During the COVID-19 pandemic, Poland received 500,000 masks from Taiwan in gesture of solidarity.

On 28 January 2021, Taiwan and Poland signed a comprehensive criminal justice cooperation agreement including provisions for fighting against transnational crime, increased judicial cooperation, and human rights and rule of law protections. This was the first such agreement signed between Taiwan and a European country.

In early September 2021, Poland donated 400,000 doses of COVID-19 vaccine to Taiwan as a "gesture of solidarity".

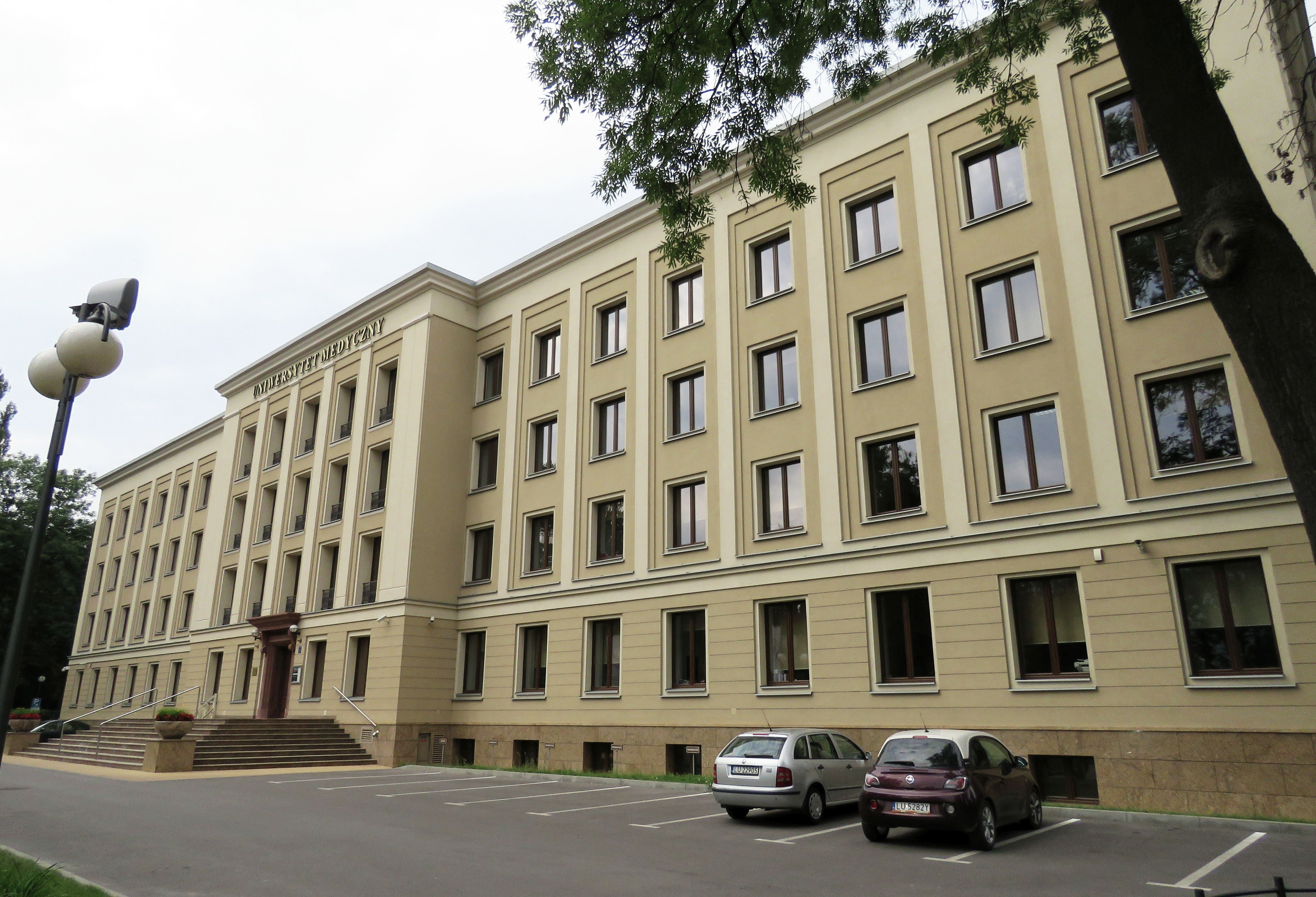
Medical University of Lublin, where more than half of Taiwanese students in Poland studied in the 2020–2021 academic year

Taiwanese students were the 16th largest group of foreign students in Poland in 2021, and the 17th largest in 2022, at the same time being the second largest group from East Asia. In the 2020–2021 academic year, the largest number of Taiwanese students attended medical universities of Lublin, Poznań, Łódź, Wrocław and Warsaw.

In 2025, Poland became Taiwan's biggest international market for drones and drone components as Poland looked to move away from Chinese drones and components as a result of the Russo-Ukrainian War.

In 2025, Taiwanese air force general Hsieh Jih-sheng spoke at the Warsaw Security Forum.

== See also ==
- Foreign relations of Poland
- Foreign relations of Taiwan
- China–Poland relations
