= Irpin urban hromada =

Irpin urban hromada Ірпінська міська громада
- Hromada
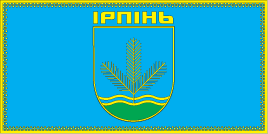
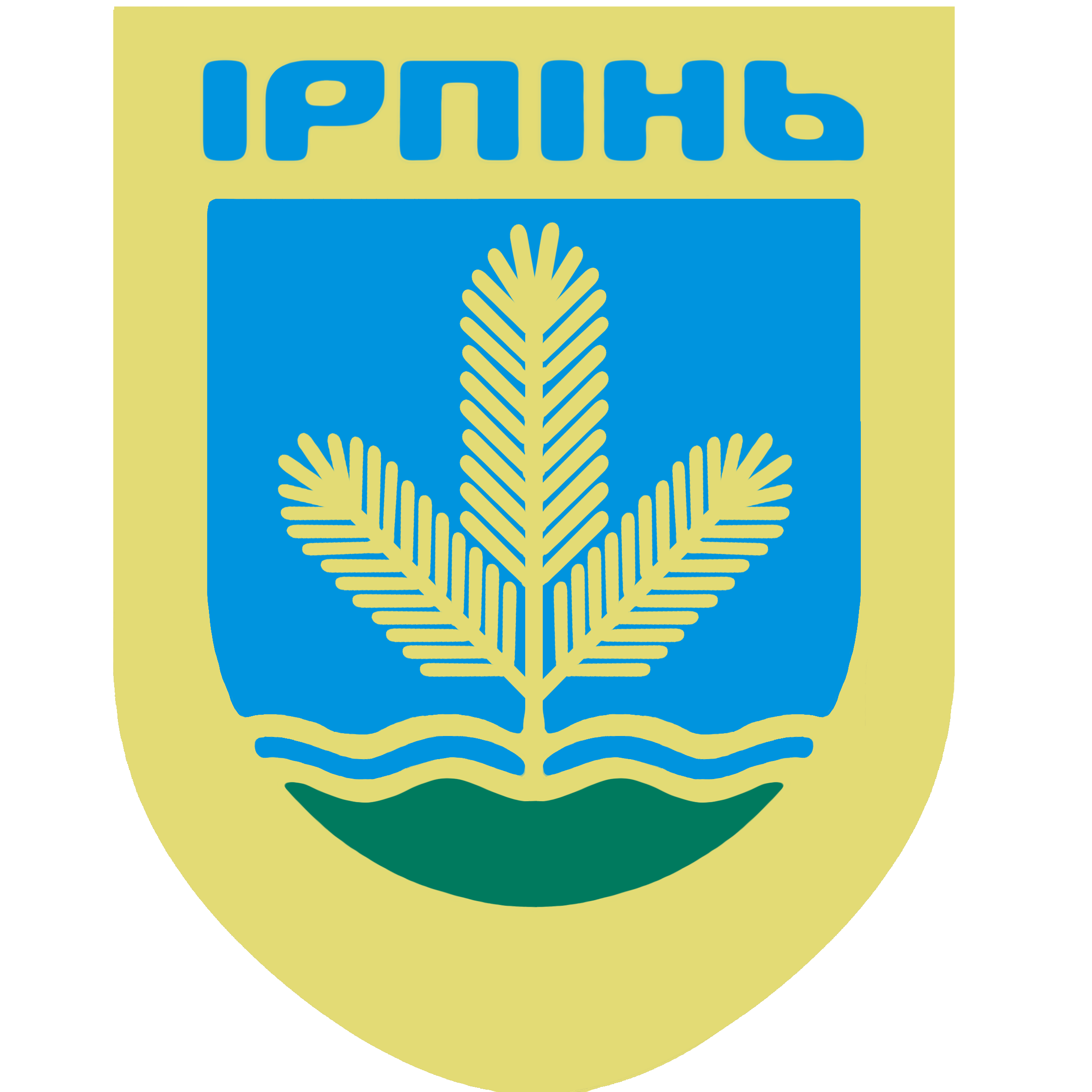
- Flag Seal
- Interactive map of Irpin urban hromada
- Country: Ukraine
- Oblast: Kyiv Oblast
- Raion: Bucha Raion

Area
  - Total: 117.2 km^{2} (45.3 sq mi)

Population (2020)
  - Total: 69,962
  - Density: 596.9/km^{2} (1,546/sq mi)
- Settlements: 5
- Cities: 1
- Villages: 4

Irpin urban hromada (Ukrainian: Ірпінська міська громада) is a hromada of Ukraine, located in Bucha Raion, Kyiv Oblast. Its administrative center is the city Irpin.

It has an area of 117.2 square kilometres (45.3 mi^{2}) and a population of 69,962, as of 2020.

The hromada contains 5 settlements: 1 city (Irpin), and 4 villages:

- Dibrova
- Zabuchchia
- Kozyntsi
- Mykhailivka-Rubezhivka

== See also ==
Irpin city hall

- List of hromadas of Ukraine
