= Ruta Kindergarten =

- Дитячий садок Рута

Location
- 2 Myru Street; Irpin, Kyiv Oblast; Ukraine
- Coordinates: 50°31′58″N 30°14′28″E

Information
- Type: Kindergarten
- Established: 24 August 2023
- Language: Ukrainian

Ruta Kindergarten (Ukrainian: Дитячий садок Рута, romanized: Dytiachyi sadok Ruta; Lithuanian: Darželis Rūta) is a Ukrainian kindergarten in the city of Irpin, Kyiv Oblast. The school was built with funding from Lithuania and Taiwan, and opened on 24 August 2023 (32nd anniversary of Independence Day). This is the first instance of cooperation between Taiwan and Lithuania towards Ukrainian reconstruction.

== History ==
=== Destruction ===
The kindergarten was originally named "Radist" (Радість), meaning "happiness", and was the largest kindergarten in Irpin at the time of the Russian invasion of Ukraine with about 400 students. As a result of Russian bombing and fire, about 75% of the school was damaged with the roofing, walls, windows, and furniture all destroyed and in need of reconstruction. The kindergarten was almost entirely full and the city desperately needed early education institutions restored.

=== Reconstruction ===
Reconstruction lasted about 8 months, with significant assistance from the Taiwanese Representative Office in Lithuania at a total of 1.2 million Euros for the purchase of furniture and accessories, and also from Lithuania at about 4.9 million Euros for construction of the building.

=== Opening ===
On 24 August 2023, the 32nd anniversary of Independence Day, the kindergarten officially opened. Gitanas Nausėda hosted the ceremony, and notable attendees included Lithuanian ambassador to Ukraine Valdemaras Sarapinas and Governor of Kyiv Oblast Ruslan Kravchenko.

"I am very pleased to see such a wonderful Ruta kindergarten, and I can only imagine how happy the children will be here. I believe that children, seeing the flag of Lithuania, will think about the state where many people who love Ukraine live"

— Gitanas Nausėda

Ambassador Sarapinas pointed out that "ruta" refers to the same plant (Ruta graveolens) in both Lithuanian and Ukrainian and represented the friendship between two nations. The ruta is also Lithuania's national plant.

Governor Kravchenko thanked ambassador Sarapinas for his personal contribution towards rebuilding society in Irpin, and gifted president Nausėda books about Irpin. Minister of Infrastructure Oleksandr Kubrakov called this reconstruction a model example for cooperation between Ukraine and its international allies.

== Infrastructure ==
Ruta Kindergarten has 3 floors in total, and also has an outdoor playground, a modern kitchen, and a basement that is also a bomb shelter. The school has the capacity for around 60 faculty members and 500 students In addition, the school contains two paintings from local artist Yulia Tripolskaya (Юлия Трипольская).
