= List of ambassadors of the Republic of China to Honduras =

Taiwanese Ambassador to Honduras
- Incumbent; Alejandro Rong Kuo Huang since November 2016
- Inaugural holder: Shen Chin Ting
- Formation: 1943; 83 years ago

The Taiwanese ambassador to Honduras is the official representative of the Republic of China to the Republic of Honduras.

== History ==
- In 1957 a legation was established in Tegucigalpa.
- On May 20, 1965, the diplomatic status of the Legation was elevated to that of an embassy.

== List of representatives ==
Diplomatic agrément/Diplomatic accreditation	Ambassador	Chinese language zh:中華民國駐宏都拉斯大使列表	Observations	List of premiers of the Republic of China	List of presidents of Honduras	Term end
1941			The governments in Tegucigalpa and Chongqing established diplomatic relations.	Chiang Kai-shek	Tiburcio Carias Andino	
1943	Shen Chin Ting	zh:沈觐鼎	Shen Jinding (Shen Chin-ting) (* 1896 † June 2000 in Hawaii): Shen Kun Ding graduated at the Tokyo Imperial University, University of Georgia, USA. Subsequently, he was employed by the Northern Government Department.; From February 1935 to September 1942 he was Chinese Ambassador to Panama.; From April 9, 1941 to July 10, 1942 he was Chinese Ambassador to Costa Rica., in Honduras minister, minister in El Salvador.; In 1942 he taught in the United States.; In 1945 he was appointed to the head of the delegation to Japan.; In September 1945, the establishment of a multilateral Allied council for the Occupation of Japan was proposed by the Soviet government as and was supported partially by the British, French and Chinese governments.; In 1948, he became deputy head of the delegation and representative of China to the Board of Governors of Japan.; From March 1950 to May 1951 he was Chinese Ambassador to Cuba.; From March 1951 to November 1955 he was Chinese Ambassador to Brazil.; From May 1956 to May 1959 he was Chinese Ambassador to Japan.; From January 1961 to January 1964he was Chinese Ambassador to the Democratic Republic of the Congo.; From January 1964 to February 1967 he was Chinese Ambassador to Iran.; He was retired in 1974	Chiang Kai-shek	Tiburcio Carias Andino	
January 1944	Tu Yun-tan	涂允檀	In March 1943 the Chinese government designated Tu Yun-tan as envoy to Panama	Chiang Kai-shek	Tiburcio Carias Andino	April 1948
December 1954	Tang Ching-hsien	zh:王季征	With residence in the Panama.: From 1952 to 1954 he was Chinese Ambassador to Panama.; From August 1953 to 1954 to Chinese Ambassador to El Salvador.; From May 1964 to October 1968 to Chinese Ambassador to Libia.; From March 1973 to August 19,747 to Chinese Ambassador to the Central African Republic.	Yu Hung-Chun	Julio Lozano Diaz	August 1955
August 1955	Yu Wang-teh	于望德	With residence in Panama (city)	Yu Hung-Chun	Julio Lozano Diaz	February 1962
March 1962	Pan Fan-sun	潘蕃蓀		José Ramón Villeda Morales	December 1965	
December 1965	Pan Fan-sun	潘蕃荪	(* 1901 in Zhejiang)	Yen Chia-kan	Oswaldo López Arellano	September 1967
September 1968	Kuei Tsung-yao	zh:桂宗尧	(* 1913 in Japan)	Yen Chia-kan	Oswaldo López Arellano	June 1973
August 1973	Yu Kuo-ping	zh:俞国斌	(* 1923 in Fenghua District † in September 13, 1974 in Tegucigalpa): During the Second Sino-Japanese War, he was a student at Fudan University (who is in the provisional capital of Chongqing), graduated from the Department of Economics.; On September 13, 1974 Ambassador of Honduras is his seat on any bus drivers killed. Another said Yu Guobin was ill in bed, the driver is a native of Honduras, having been bribed to sneak into the residence of Ambassador Yu, Yu shot and killed .; Envoy killed after row with driver TEGUCIGALPA (Honduras), Saturday HONDURAN President Oswaldo Lopez 11 Arellano led members of his Cabinet and tr.e local diplomatic corps in mourning today for Mr. Yu Kuo-ping, Taiwan's Ambassador to Honduras, who was allegedly shot and killed yesterday by an embassy chauffeur.	Chiang Ching-kuo	Oswaldo López Arellano	September 1974
April 1975	Tang Ching-hsuan	唐京轩	(* 1916)	Chiang Ching-kuo	Juan Alberto Melgar Castro	January 1980
March 3, 1980	Yu Peng	zh:于彭	(* September 9, 1916) the second son of KMT elder Yu Yu-jen.: graduate from Nanking University, a master's degree at the University of Edinburgh, after international relations at Columbia University as a researcher.; Former Republic of the Ministry of Foreign Affairs Division of the Inter-American Specialized Commission China.; From March 1956, he served as advisor to the Embassy of the Republic of China in Peru.; October 1962, served as Charge d'Affaires in Kingston Jamaican Embassy.; As of February 1967, he served as Deputy Director of the Ministry of Foreign Affairs Intelligence Division, Secretary Jane Executive Secretary and Committee on Cultural Affairs Committee for Foreign Economic Research Projects and Executive Secretary of the Senate Executive Yuan and the Rest of staff.; From July 1971 to 1975 he was Charge d Affairs in Manila. Philippines.; January 1976, no Department of Consular Affairs director. From January 1980, he served as ambassador in the Republic of Honduras.; After graduating from the University of Edinburgh, he received a master's degree from the University of Edinburgh, where he was an international researcher at Columbia University. Former Member of the American Department of the Ministry of Foreign Affairs of the Republic of China.: In March 1956, he served as Counselor of the Embassy of the Republic of China in Peru.; In October 1962, he was appointed to the embassy in Jamaica.; Since February 1967, he has served as Deputy Director of the Information Department of the Ministry of Foreign Affairs, General Secretary and Executive Secretary of Foreign Economic and Cultural Affairs Committee, Research and Design Committee and Executive Secretary, Executive Yuan.; July 1971, transferred to the Embassy of the Republic of China in the Philippines Embassy.; In January 1976, he served as Director of the Consular Affairs of the Ministry of Foreign Affairs.	Sun Yun-suan	Policarpio Juan Paz Garcia	July 1986
June 6, 1986	Huang Chuan-li	黃傳禮	(* February 13, 1929 in Jiangsu) married Huang, Lucia, 1 daughter and one son.: 1955: Bachelor of Laws, National Taiwan University.; 1958: LL.M., National Central University.; From 1963 to 1966 he was 3rd Sec, Permanent Mission to UN.; From 1966 to 1971 he was 2nd Sec., Ch. Emb., Washington, D.C. .; From 1972 to 1976 he was Dep. Dir., Dept. of Int. Aff., MOFA.; From 1976 to 1978 he was Couns., Embassy in South Korea.; In 1978 he was Consul General in Houston.	Yu Kuo-hwa	José Simon Azcona Hoyo	December 1996
December 1996	Ching-Yen Chang	張慶衍	(*February 28, 1934 in Zhejiang) married King Theresa they have one daughter.: Bachelor of Laws Soochow University School of Law Grad. Sch. Law Cent., Georgetown U.; From 1965 to 1968 he was Vice-Consul in Honolulu.; From 1969 to 1971 he was Sect. Chief, MOFA.; From 1971 to 1978 he was Counsl at the embassy in Washington, D.C..; From 1979 to 1983 he was Div. Dir., "Taiwan-Coordination Council for North American Affairs" (CCNAA), Washington, D.C..; From 1984 to 1988 he was Secretary General of the CCNAA.; From 1988 to 1989 he was Dir.-Gen., CCNAA in Chicago.; From 1989 to 1994 he was CCNAA, Los Angeles.; From 1994 to 1996 he was Chinese Ambassador to the Bahamas.	Lien Chan	Carlos Roberto Reina	October 2002
October 2002	Tien-De You	游天德	July 5, 2002 T. T. Yu	Yu Shyi-kun	Ricardo Maduro	June 2006
June 2006	Lai Chieng-chung	賴建中		Su Tseng-chang	Manuel Zelaya	August 2011
August 2011	Joseph Yong Liang Kuo	郭永樑		Wu Den-yih	Porfirio Lobo Sosa	2016年11月
November 2016	Alejandro Rong Kuo Huang	黃榮國	(* Twn. Nov. 22, 1954) married.: 1980: Graduate from the Central Police University.; From 1993 to 1996 he was 2nd Sec. Taipei Economic and Cultural Representative Office (TECO) in Mexico.; From 1996 to 1998 he was Sect. Chief, Dept. of Protocol, Ministry of Foreign Affairs (Taiwan).; From 1998 to 2000 he was 1st Sec., ROC Emb. in the Rupub. of Costa Rica .; From 2001 to 2004 he was Dep. Consul-Gen. & Consul-Gen., Consl. Gen. in Ea. City, Paraguay .; From 2004 to 2007 he was Dep. Dir.-Gen., Dept. of Protocol, MOFA .; From 2007 to 2009 he was Dep. Rep., TECO in Bolivia .; From 2009 to 2010 he was Deputy Representative at TECO in Peru .	Wu Den-yih	Porfirio Lobo Sosa	
