= Taipei Representative Office, Warsaw =

Taiwanese de facto embassy

Taipei Representative Office in Poland 駐波蘭臺北代表處
- Biuro Przedstawicielskie Tajpej w Polsce
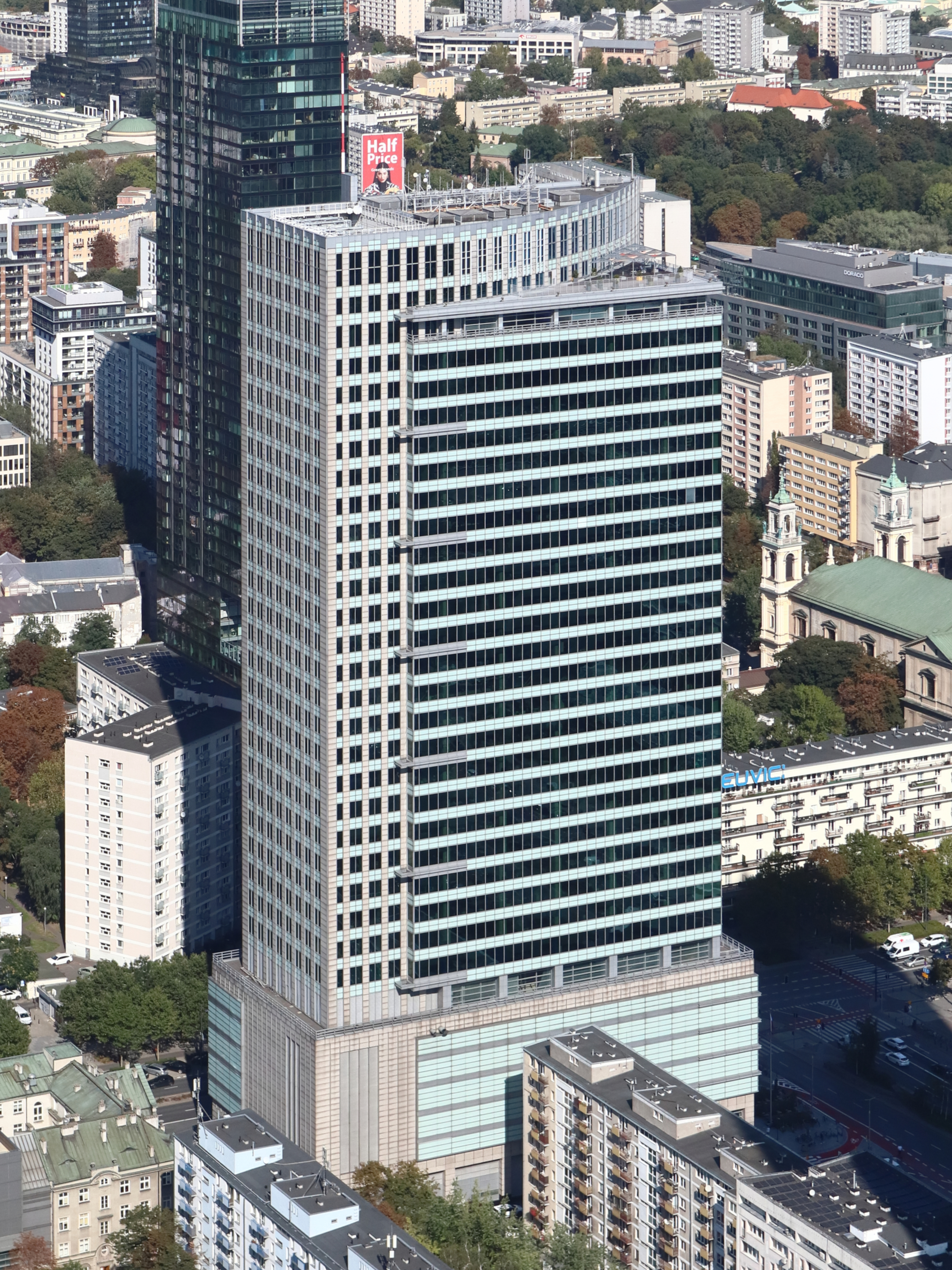

Agency overview
- Formed: 17 December 1992
- Jurisdiction: Poland (Diplomatic mission of Taiwan); Ukraine (from 2022)
- Headquarters: Warsaw, Poland; 52°14′0.9″N 21°00′8.19″E
- Agency executive: Jeff Y.J. Liu, Representative
- Website: Official website

The Taipei Representative Office in Poland represents the interests of Taiwan in Poland, functioning as a de facto embassy in the absence of diplomatic relations.

The representative office is responsible for promoting bilateral relations between Taiwan and Poland, and promoting trade, investment, tourism, scientific and technological cooperation, and cultural exchanges. It is divided into business group, economic group and education group. It also has the functions of handling passports, visas, document certification, expatriate services, and emergency relief for foreigners in travel, which is equivalent to an embassy in a country with diplomatic relations. Since 2004, the representative office is based at Warsaw Financial Center.

The representative agency of the Polish government in Taiwan is the Polish Office in Taipei.

== History ==
In July 1992, the Polish and Taiwanese governments reached an agreement to set up offices in the capital. On 17 December 1992, the "Taipei Economic and Cultural Office in Poland" was established. On 1 August 2018, the "Taipei Economic and Cultural Office in Poland" was renamed the "Taipei Reprencentative Office". On 16 October 2020, considering the situation the COVID-19 pandemic in Poland, the consumer counter was temporarily closed for 14 days. On 24 February 2022, after the outbreak of the Russian invasion of Ukraine, the affairs related to Ukraine were transferred to the Taipei Representative Office in Poland.

== See also ==
- Poland–Taiwan relations
