= Irpin Company Tactical Group =

Ukrainian volunteer formation

Irpin Company Tactical Group (2023 – present) Irpin Volunteer Company Tactical Group (2022–2023)
- Ukrainian: Ротно-тактична група "Ірпінь"
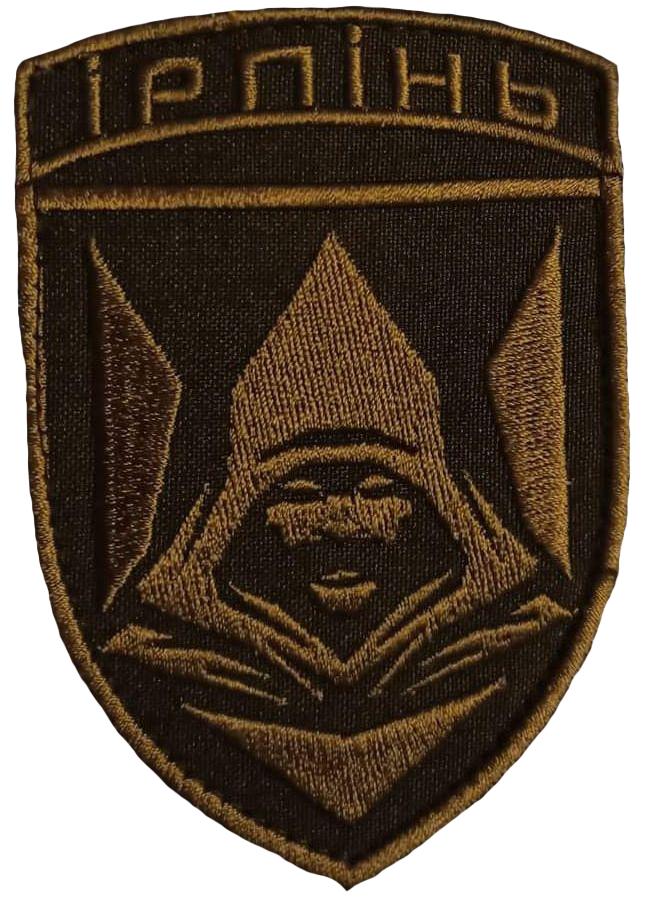
- Active: February 2022 - present
- Country: Ukraine
- Branch: Armed Forces of Ukraine
- Type: Military reserve force
- Role: Light infantry
- Part of: Territorial Defense Forces
- Garrison/HQ: Kyiv Oblast

Commanders
- Notable commanders: Volodymyr Korotia

The Irpin Company Tactical Group (Ukrainian: Ротно-тактична група "Ірпінь") is a Ukrainian volunteer formation that is part of the 243rd Territorial Defense Battalion 114th Territorial Defense Brigade.

== History ==
Established in February 2022 by the decision of the Bucha District Military Administration.

=== Russian invasion of Ukraine (2022) ===
On 27 February 2022, at about 7 o'clock, the first battle with the Russian occupiers took place in Irpin, during which the Pskov paratroopers were eliminated.

On the same day, at 10 o'clock, the group's fighters went to Bucha, where they captured 4 enemy mechanized vehicles and destroyed 4 units of equipment and about 30 enemy paratroopers. Then 11 mechanized vehicles of the occupiers were burned. The fighters also conducted raids against the Russian occupiers in Blystavytsia, Hostomel, Vorzel.

For 24 days, the DRTH soldiers held the defense in the area of the Zhyraf shopping center in Irpin.

Later, the company participated in the battle of Bakhmut.

== Names of the unit ==
- 2022 - Irpin Volunteer Company Tactical Group
- 2023 - Irpin Company Tactical Group

== Commands ==
- Junior Lieutenant Volodymyr Korotia (2022)
- Oleksandr Tkachenko – commander of the first assault platoon
- Rostyslav Chernobrovyi – commander of the second assault platoon
