= Myrotske =

Rural locality in Kyiv Oblast, Ukraine

Myrotske Мироцьке
- Village
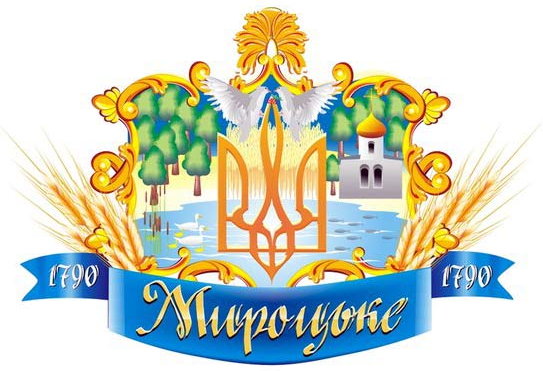
- Seal

- Location in Ukraine Myrotske (Ukraine)
- Coordinates: 50°34′52″N 30°06′59″E
- Country: Ukraine
- Oblast: Kyiv Oblast
- Raion: Bucha Raion
- Founded: 1790

Area
  - Total: 2.547 km^{2} (0.983 sq mi)

Population (2001)
  - Total: 1,535
  - Density: 602.7/km^{2} (1,561/sq mi)
- Time zone: UTC+2 (EET)
  - Summer (DST): UTC+3 (EEST)
- Postal code: 08104
- Area code: +380 4597

Myrotske (Ukrainian: Мироцьке, Russian: Мироцкое) is a village in Bucha Raion of Kyiv Oblast (province) of Ukraine. It belongs to Bucha urban hromada, one of the hromadas of Ukraine.

The closest railway station is in Nemishaieve – 3 km away. The closest settlements are Nemishaieve – 2 km, Vorzel – 7 km and Bucha – 10 km away.

== History ==
The main occupation in the village is agriculture. Prior to the town's formation, in the 19th century, the settlement was a possession of the influential Russian Vorontsov family. In the 20th century it was part of sovkhoz (state farm) Kievskiy.

Until 18 July 2020, Myrotske belonged to Kyiv-Sviatoshyn Raion. The raion was abolished that day as part of the administrative reform of Ukraine, which reduced the number of raions of Kyiv Oblast to seven. The area of Kyiv-Sviatoshyn Raion was split between Bucha, Fastiv, and Obukhiv Raions, with Myrotske being transferred to Bucha Raion.

== Notable people ==
- Viktor Marchenko (1969–2014) — senior sergeant of the Armed Forces of Ukraine, participant in the Russo-Ukrainian War.
