= Volodymyr Korotia =

Ukrainian military commander (born 1987)

- Володимир Коротя

Commander of the Irpin Company Tactical Group
- Incumbent
- Assumed office 2022

Personal details
- Born: Volodymyr Hennadiiovych Korotia; 15 October 1987 (age 38)
- Nickname: Повстанець (Povstanet)

Military service
- Allegiance: Ukraine
- Branch/service: Armed Forces of Ukraine
- Rank: Junior lieutenant
- Battles/wars: Russo-Ukrainian War; War in Donbas; Russian invasion of Ukraine; Battle of Irpin; Battle of Bucha; Battle of Bakhmut
- Awards: Order of Bohdan Khmelnytsky, 3rd class; Order for Courage, 3rd class

Volodymyr Hennadiiovych Korotia (Ukrainian: Володимир Геннадійович Коротя, call sign "Povstanets"; born 15 October 1987) is a Ukrainian writer, public figure, serviceman, junior lieutenant of the Irpin Company Tactical Group of the Territorial Defense Forces of the Armed Forces of Ukraine, a participant in the Russian-Ukrainian war. Member of the Bucha City Council (2020).

== Biography ==
Until 2014, he was a food technologist.

In 2014–2016, he voluntarily joined the Armed Forces of Ukraine. He took part in combat operations as part of a reconnaissance platoon of one of the battalions of the 10th separate mountain assault brigade in eastern Ukraine. He was demobilized in 2016. He built solar power plants in Ukraine and Europe.

During the full-scale Russian invasion of Ukraine on 24 February 2022, he created and headed the Irpin Volunteer Company Tactical Group, thanks to which the Russian occupiers failed to break through the volunteers' defense near the Zhyraf shopping center in Irpin.

Participant in the battle of Bakhmut. Now the commander of the 1st rifle battalion of the 3rd Assault Brigade.

== Creative works ==
Author of the books Adventures of the Phantom (2020) and Reflections of the Phantom on State Building (2022).

== Awards ==
- Order of Bohdan Khmelnytsky, 3rd class (14 March 2023)
- Order For Courage, 3rd class (12 August 2022)
- Order of the People's Hero of Ukraine (2023)
- the Firearms insignia of the Ministry of Defense of Ukraine (8 May 2023).

== Military ranks ==
- Junior Lieutenant (06.27.2022)
- Sergeant (until 2022).
