= Russian convoy =

Russian convoy may refer to:

- Russian Kyiv convoy, a vehicle convoy that was part of the Kyiv offensive during the 2022 Russian invasion of Ukraine
- Arctic convoys of World War II, naval convoys delivering supplies to the northern ports of the Soviet Union during World War II
