= Bucha, Ukraine =

City in Kyiv Oblast, Ukraine

Bucha Буча
- City
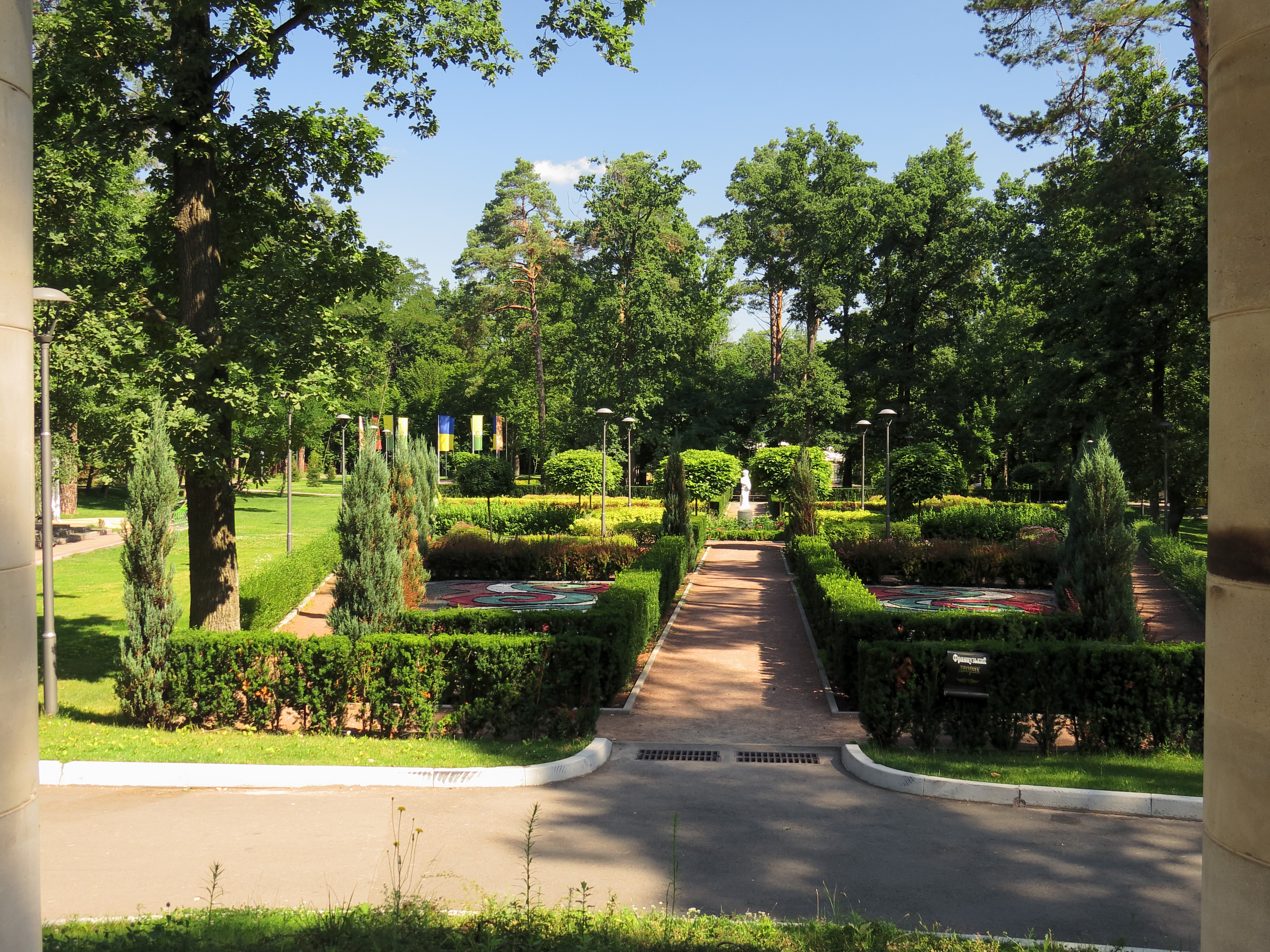
- Bucha city park

- Flag Coat of arms
- Interactive map of Bucha
- Location within Kyiv Oblast Location within Ukraine
- Coordinates: 50°32′47″N 30°14′6″E
- Country: Ukraine
- Oblast: Kyiv Oblast
- Raion: Bucha Raion
- Hromada: Bucha urban hromada

Area
  - Total: 26.57 km^{2} (10.26 sq mi)

Population (2022)
  - Total: 37,321
  - Density: 1,405/km^{2} (3,638/sq mi)
- Postal code: 08292—08295
- Area code: +380 4597
- Website: www.bucha-rada.gov.ua

Bucha (Ukrainian: Буча, pronounced [ˈbutʃɐ]) is a city in Ukraine's Kyiv Oblast. Administratively, it serves as the administrative center of Bucha Raion. It hosts the administration of Bucha urban hromada, one of the hromadas of Ukraine. Its population is approximately 37,321 (2022 estimate). Bucha Day is celebrated in the city between 11 and 13 September.

The battle of Bucha was a major part of the northern front of the Russian invasion of Ukraine. The battle lasted from 27 February to 31 March 2022, when Russian forces withdrew and mayor Anatolii Fedoruk reported that the city had been fully retaken.

After Ukrainian forces regained control of Bucha, reports and testimonies of war crimes committed by the Russian military began to circulate. These war crimes have been collectively labeled the Bucha massacre.

== Etymology ==
According to a local historian from Bucha, Anatoliya Zborovsky, Bucha was named after a nearby river, the Bucha River, which referred to the strength of the river's currents in ancient times.

According to an urban legend, during the construction of the railway station, the workers were not paid so they started a huge scandal, or "bucha" (Ukrainian: буча – scandal). The railway station received this name after its completion, so did the village.

== History ==
The settlement arose with the construction of the Kyiv–Kovel railway in 1898 around a small train stop by the Bucha River along the Kyiv–Kovel railway similar to one in the modern city of Irpin.

In close vicinity to the Bucha train stop, there was a small village called Yablunka, where there used to be a brick factory. Yablunka is mentioned in the 19th century Polish Geographic dictionary as the village of Jabłonka 37 versts away from Kyiv. The construction of the Irpin Central House of Culture was instigated by the administration of a brick and tile factory reported as being in Bucha, and constructed and funded by the people of Irpin in 1954. Much of the building was destroyed by Russian shelling in March 2022.

During World War II, before the liberation of Kiev from Nazi forces in December 1943, Bucha was the location of the headquarters of the 1st Ukrainian Front commanded by General Vatutin.

Bucha was granted city status on 9 February 2006 (previously, Bucha was an urban-type settlement within the Irpin city municipality). Until 18 July 2020, Bucha was incorporated as a city of oblast significance. In July 2020, as part of the administrative reform of Ukraine, which reduced the number of raions of Kyiv Oblast to seven, the city of Bucha was merged into Bucha Raion.

=== 2022 Russian invasion ===
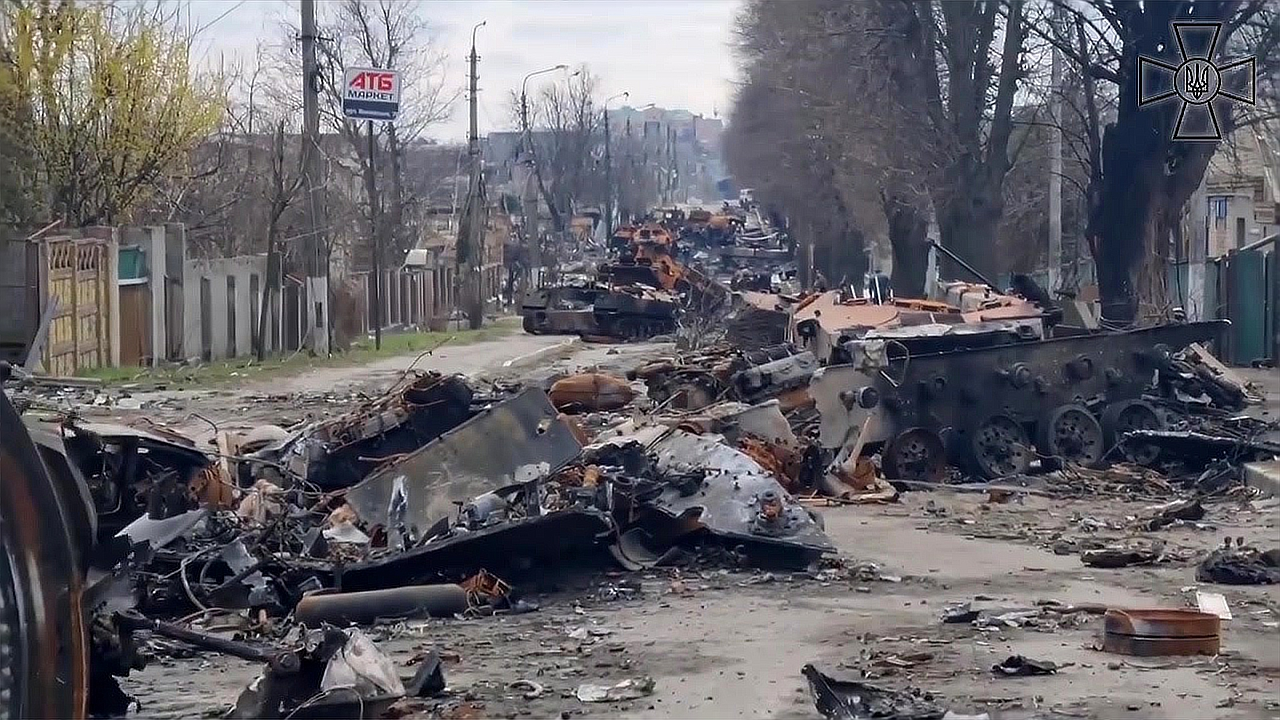
Destroyed Russian column on Vokzalna Street of Bucha

During the 2022 Russian invasion of Ukraine, heavy fighting took place in Bucha as part of the Kyiv offensive, resulting in severe Russian losses. The city was captured by Russian forces on 12 March. Mayor Anatoliy Fedoruk announced the recapture of Bucha by Ukrainian forces on 31 March 2022.

A few days after the recapture, on 2 April 2022, news reports and videos emerged showing streets in Bucha covered with the bodies of men dressed in civilian clothes. Some of those found had their hands tied. Among those killed were women and children. According to first estimations at least 280 bodies were found. There was also evidence that Russian soldiers had systemically tortured, mutilated and executed many Ukrainians in the basement of a summer camp. The event caused the Ukrainian government to call on the ICC to investigate whether or not Russia had committed war crimes. On 7 April, the mayor of Bucha, Anatoliy Fedoruk, reported that almost 90% of the dead residents had bullet wounds, not shrapnel wounds.

Soon after the town's liberation, rebuilding efforts began. CNN reported in February 2023 that some areas looked almost "back to normal". The road near Bucha has a "graveyard" of destroyed Russian military equipment that has become a tourist attraction and pilgrimage destination for Ukrainians to "see what victory looks like."

On 2 July 2023, a memorial to 501 dead residents of Bucha, one of the first towns to be occupied by the Russian military, was unveiled.

== Population ==
=== Language ===
Distribution of the population by native language according to the 2001 census:

Language	Number	Percentage
Ukrainian	24 936	88.18%
Russian	3 206	11.34%
Other^{[a]}	137	0.48%
Total	28 279	100.00%

^{a} Those who did not indicate their native language or indicated a language that was native to less than 1% of the local population.

== Economy ==
A popular resort known for its pine forests, Bucha has also served as a centre of peat and sawmill, brick production and metallurgy.

== Geography ==
Bucha is located in Kyiv Oblast, 25 km (16 mi) west of Kyiv. It borders the cities of Irpin and Hostomel and the villages of Vorzel, Mykhailivka-Rubezhivka, and Blystavytsia.

== Places and people ==
Church of Andrew the Apostle

There is a stadium in Bucha named Yuvileiny Stadium, where some matches were held in October 2016 for the 2017 UEFA European Under-19 Championship qualification.

There is a glass factory in Bucha. Built in 1946, it was closed in 2016. There is a small train stop called "Sklozavodska".

The town's main landmark is a 19th-century railway station located at the south edge of the city. Through the city runs a major highway M 07.

Writer Mikhail Bulgakov stayed in Bucha with his family during the summer season in his cottage.

== Twin towns ==
Bucha is twinned with:

- Bergamo, Italy
- Bergisch Gladbach, Germany
- Bilhorod-Dnistrovskyi, Ukraine
- Bucsa, Hungary
- Cascais, Portugal
- Hyvinkää, Finland
- Katowice, Poland
- Kavadarci, North Macedonia
- Kovel, Ukraine
- Ospedaletto Euganeo, Italy
- Palanga, Lithuania
- Pont-de-Chéruy, France
- Pszczyna, Poland
- Škofja Loka, Slovenia
- Tiachiv, Ukraine
- Tuszyn, Poland

=== Partner town ===
- (United States) Albany, New York, USA

== Gallery ==
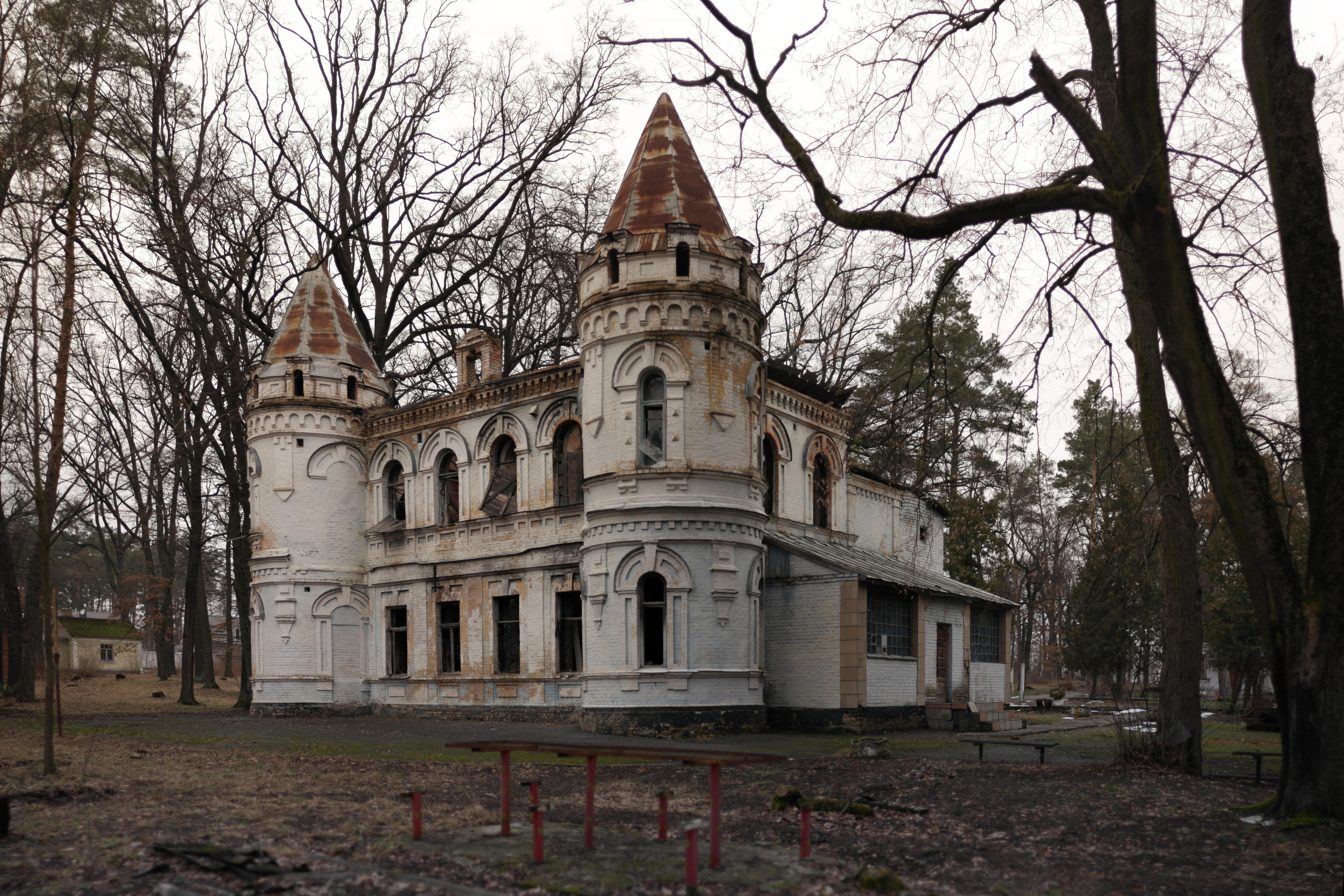
Shtamm's Country House Ruins in Bucha

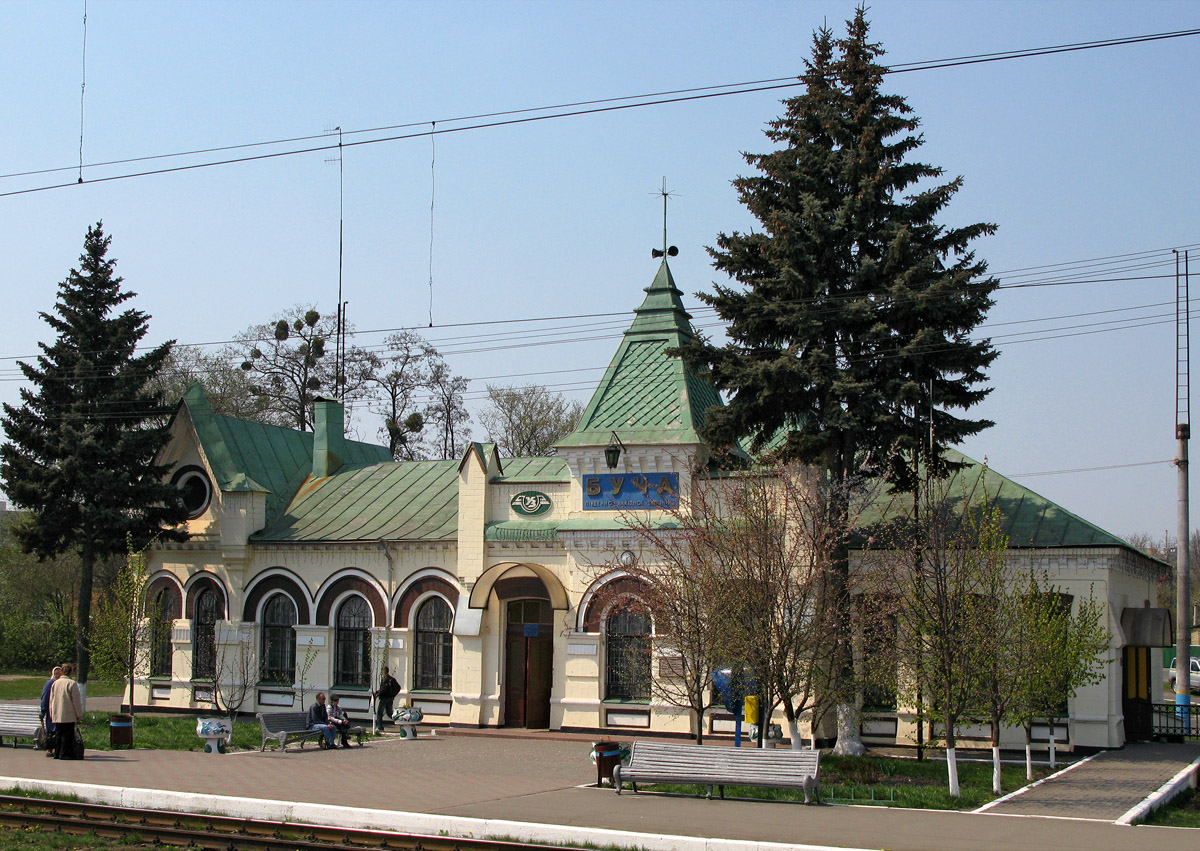
Bucha railway station

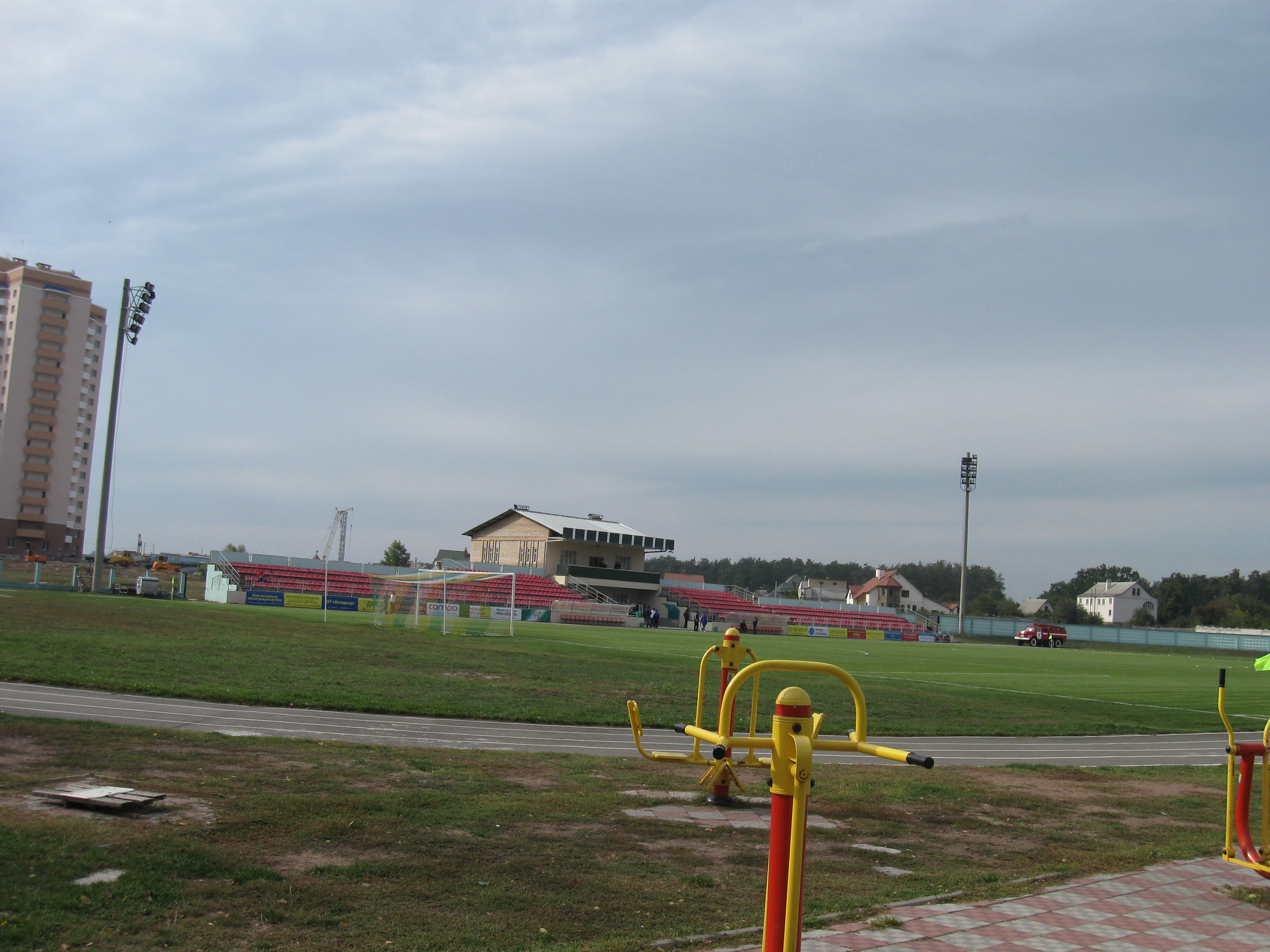
City stadium "Yuvileinyi"

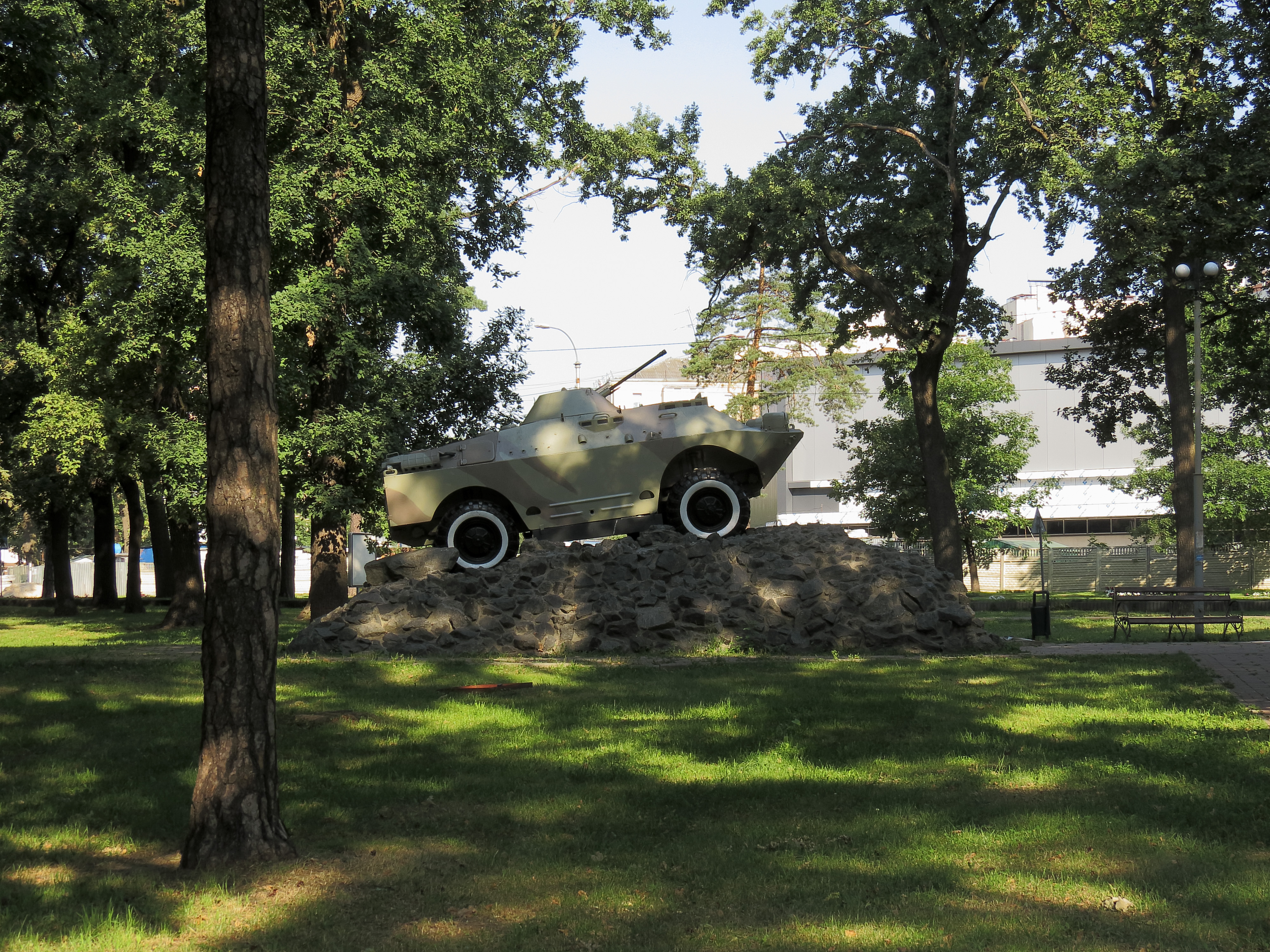
Afghanistan war memorial
