= Anatoliy Fedoruk =

Ukrainian politician (born 1972)

- Анатолій Федорук
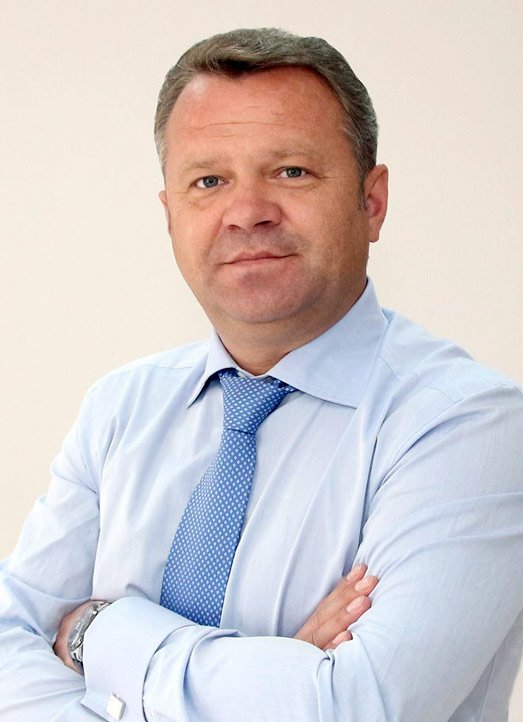
- Fedoruk in 2014

Mayor of Bucha
- Incumbent
- Assumed office 7 April 1998

Personal details
- Born: Anatoly Petrovich Fedoruk; 10 May 1972 (age 54) Velyka Medvedivka, Krasyliv Raion, Khmelnytskyi Oblast, Ukrainian SSR, Soviet Union (now Ukraine)
- Party: Party of Regions; Servant of the People
- Occupation: politician
- Profession: Teacher

Anatoliy Petrovych Fedoruk (Ukrainian: Анатолій Петрович Федорук, born 10 May 1972) is a Ukrainian politician serving as mayor of Bucha, Kyiv Region, Ukraine since April 7, 1998. He is Chairman of the Board of the Kyiv Regional Branch of the Association of Ukrainian Cities.

== Early life ==
Fedoruk was born on 10 May 1972 in the village of Velyka Medvedivka, which was then part of Khmelnytskyi Oblast in the Ukrainian SSR. After attending secondary school, he was briefly a sports instructor for a collective farm in Velyka Medvedivka. From 1989 to 1990 he was then a student at the National Pedagogical Drahomanov University, but he left the school to joined the armed forces. Upon returning in 1992, he returned to his studies at the National Pedagogical Drahomanov University, eventually receiving his diploma in the specialty of world history in 1997.

During his studies, from 1992 and 1993, Anatoly Fedoruk was a history teacher at a secondary school in his native Velyka Medvedivka. From 1993 to 1997 he was mayor of the local municipality. In 1997 and 1998 Fedoruk was teacher at a Bucha secondary orphanage.

== Political career ==
Fedoruk was first elected mayor of Bucha in 1998; he was reelected in 2006, 2010, 2015 and 2020. In 2010 he was elected as a candidate of the pro-Russian Party of Regions. In 2015 he was elected for New Faces and in 2020 as a candidate of Servant of the People.

In 2011 Fedoruk became Chairman of the Board of the Kyiv Regional Branch of the Association of Ukrainian Cities.

In the 2014 Ukrainian parliamentary election, this time as a self-nominated candidate, in electoral district 95, Fedoruk failed to win a parliamentary seat, losing to Mykhailo Havryliuk. In October 2016, the Pecherskyi District Court of Kyiv briefly removed Fedoruk from the post of mayor until 11 December 2016 on suspicion of abuse of office due to land fraud which he then tried to buy off law enforcement officers to cover up.

In 2017 Fedoruk was suspected of abuse of power. Hearings have been going on for several years but are constantly postponed.

Anatoly Fedoruk attracted international attention in the aftermath of the Battle of Bucha that lasted from February 27, 2022 to March 31, 2022, during which time the Bucha massacre occurred. In an interview with the Italian newspaper Corriere della Sera published on April 5, 2022, he said that the Russian soldiers had killed Bucha residents "out of anger or for enjoyment". The same day, in a video message he urged in particular medical doctors and utility company employees to return to the city.

== Personal life ==
During the Battle of Bucha, Fedoruk was wounded on 6 March.

== Awards ==
- Order of Merit 2d class (August 23, 2021)
- Order of Merit 3d class (December 4, 2007)
