= Bucha urban hromada =

Bucha urban hromada Бучанська міська громада
- Hromada
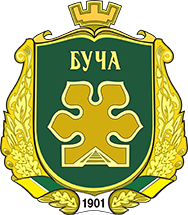
- Seal
- Interactive map of Bucha urban hromada
- Country: Ukraine
- Oblast: Kyiv Oblast
- Raion: Bucha Raion

Area
  - Total: 260.8 km^{2} (100.7 sq mi)

Population (2020)
  - Total: 57,163
  - Density: 219.2/km^{2} (567.7/sq mi)
- Settlements: 14
- Cities: 1
- Rural settlements: 2
- Villages: 11

Bucha urban hromada (Ukrainian: Бучанська міська громада) is a hromada of Ukraine, located in Bucha Raion, Kyiv Oblast. Its administrative center is the city Bucha.

It has an area of 260.8 square kilometres (100.7 mi^{2}) and a population of 57,163, as of 2020.

The hromada contains 14 settlements: 1 city (Bucha), 2 rural settlements (Babyntsi and Vorzel), and 11 villages:

- Blystavytsia
- Buda-Babynetska
- Chervone
- Havrylivka
- Lubianka
- Myrotske
- Rakivka
- Syniak
- Tarasivshchyna
- Voronkivka
- Zdvyzhivka

== See also ==
- List of hromadas of Ukraine
