= Bucha railway station =

Railway station in Bucha, Kyiv Oblast, Ukraine

Bucha Буча
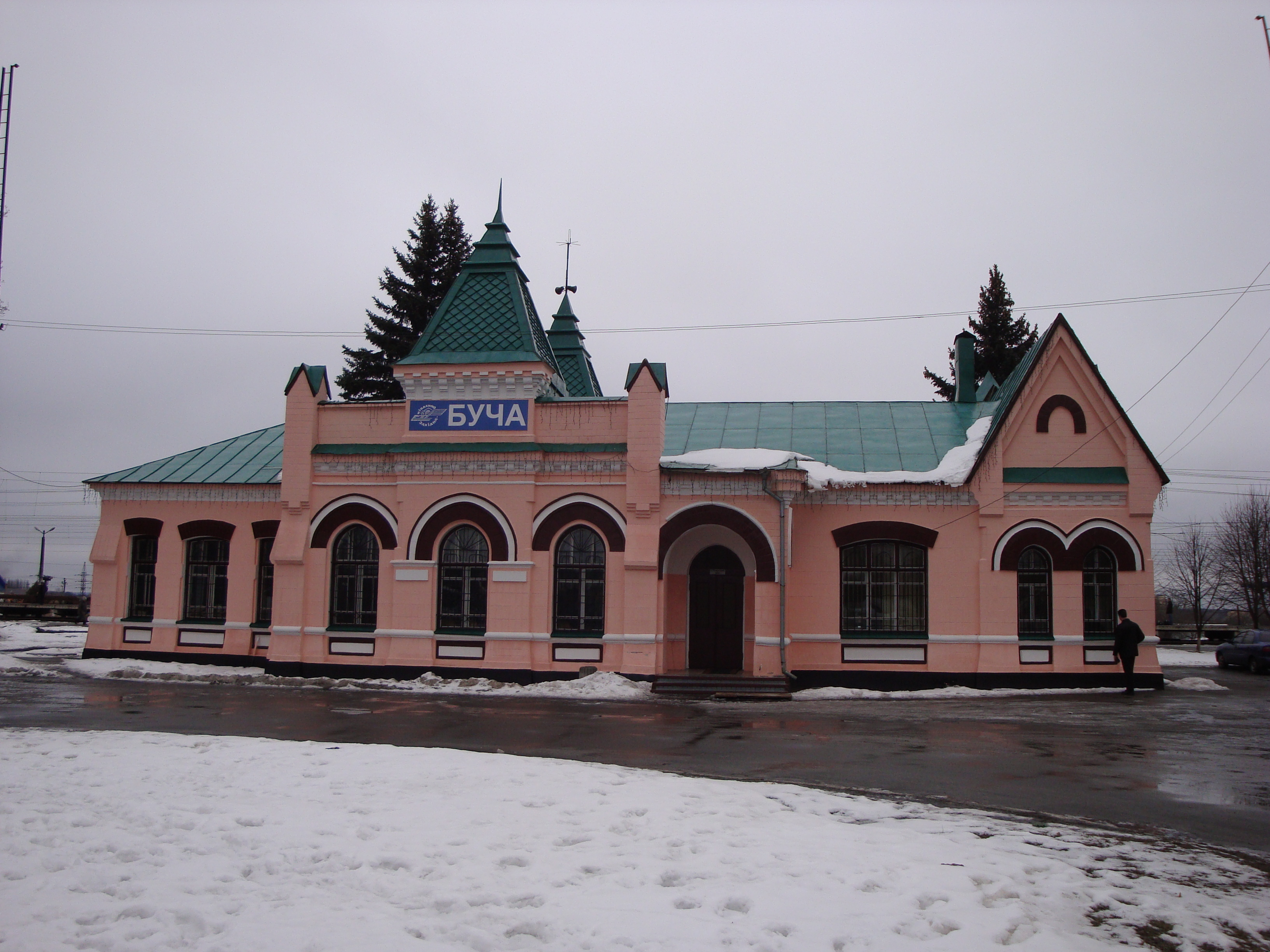
- Front view of the railway station

General information
- Location: 3 Zhovtneva Street, Bucha, Bucha Raion; Kyiv Oblast, Ukraine
- Coordinates: 50°32′56″N 30°13′17″E
- System: Southwestern Railways station
- Operator: Southwestern Railways
- Distance: 30.7 kilometres (19.1 mi) from Kyiv
- Platforms: 2

Other information
- Station code: 322106

History
- Opened: 1901
Location

Bucha railway station (Ukrainian: Станція Буча) is a railway station in the Ukrainian city of Bucha, and is operated through the Southwestern Railways.

== History ==
In early 1900s, the city of Bucha began as a result of a railway stop needed along the Kyiv-Kovel railway line. The station was meant to serve economic purposes during peacetime, and military ones in case of war.

On September 24 and 25, 2016, the city of Bucha celebrated its 115th anniversary. The city held festive events for this occasion, including some at this railway station.

== Station ==
The station was reconstruction in 2001 to celebreate its 100-year anniversary since opening. Since reopening, the station building now houses administrative areas, along with waiting spaces and ticket offices. There are plans to expand the current building to improve the station's functioning.
