= Lubianka, Bucha Raion, Kyiv Oblast =

Village in Kyiv Oblast, Ukraine

Lubianka
- Village
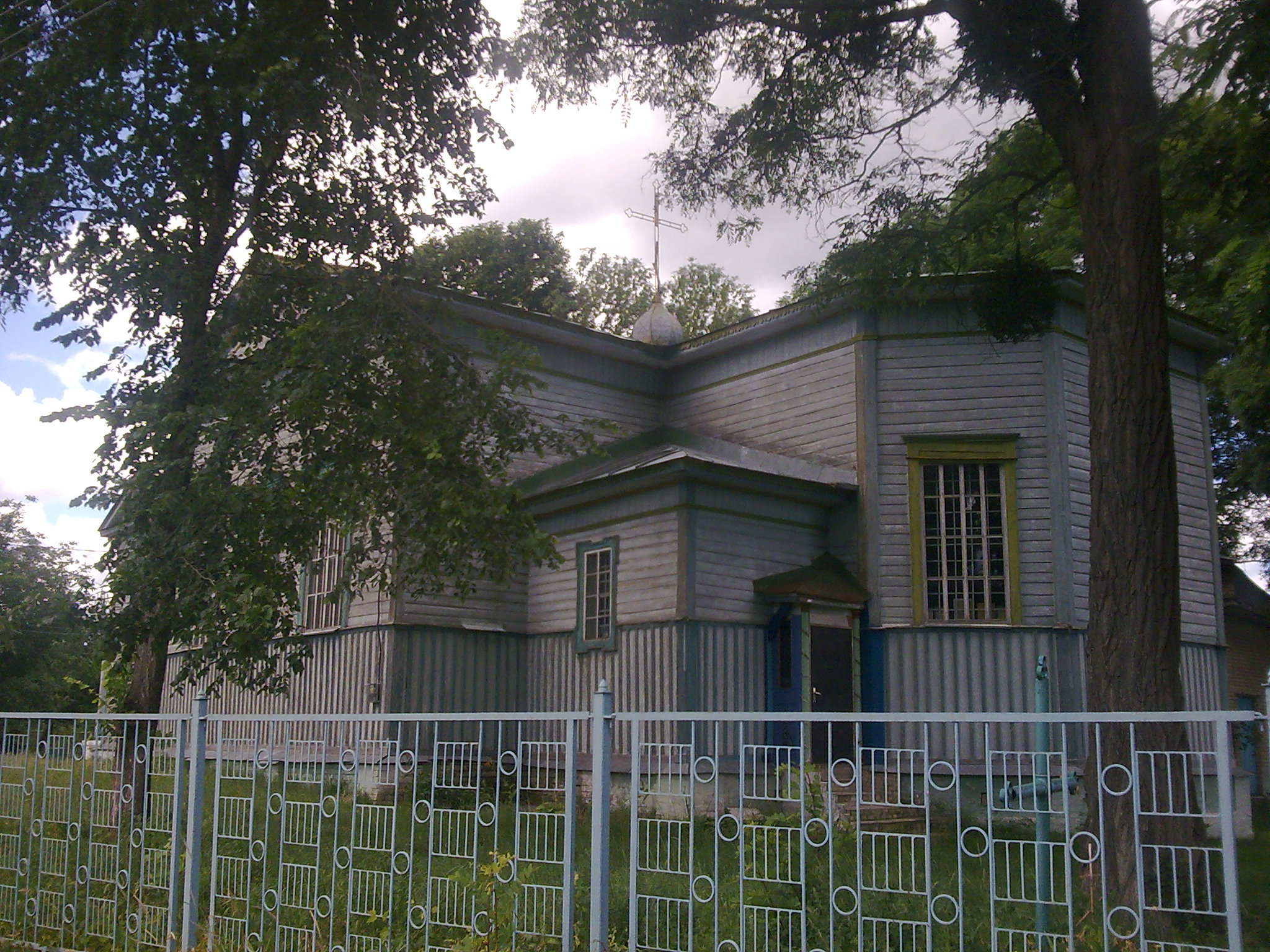
- Church building in Lubianka

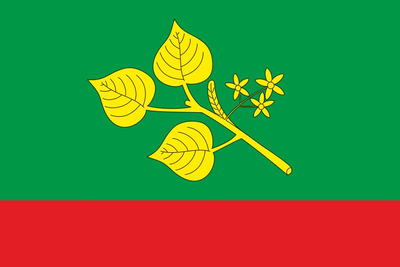
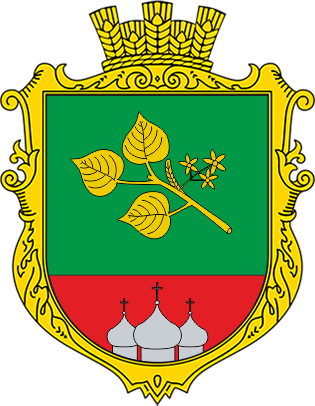
- Flag Coat of arms

- Location of Lubianka within Ukraine Lubianka (Ukraine)
- Coordinates: 50.6512°N 30.1700°E
- Country: Ukraine
- Oblast: Kyiv Oblast
- Raion: Bucha Raion
- Elevation: 143 m (469 ft)
- Postal code: 07831
- Area code: +380 4577

Lubianka (Ukrainian: Луб'янка, romanized: Lub'yanka) is a village in Bucha Raion, Kyiv Oblast, Ukraine, situated to the north-west of the capital city Kyiv. It belongs to Bucha urban hromada, one of the hromadas of Ukraine.

Until 18 July 2020, Lubianka belonged to Borodianka Raion. The raion was abolished that day as part of the administrative reform of Ukraine, which reduced the number of raions of Kyiv Oblast to seven. The area of Borodianka Raion was merged into Bucha Raion.

During the 2022 invasion of Ukraine, units dispersed from the Russian Kyiv convoy set up in Lubianka and its nearby forests.
