= Babyntsi =

Rural locality in Kyiv Oblast, Ukraine

Babyntsi Бабинці
- Rural settlement
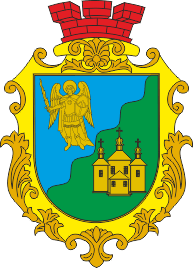
- Flag Coat of arms

- Location of Babyntsi in Ukraine
- Coordinates: 50°38′28″N 30°01′37″E
- Country: Ukraine
- Oblast: Kyiv Oblast
- Raion: Bucha Raion
- Hromada: Bucha urban hromada
- Town status: 1938

Government
  - Town Head: Viktor Shaliuta

Area
  - Total: 34 km^{2} (13 sq mi)

Population (2022)
  - Total: 2,320
  - Density: 68/km^{2} (180/sq mi)
- Time zone: UTC+2 (EET)
  - Summer (DST): UTC+3 (EEST)
- Postal code: 08655
- Area code: +380 4571
- Website: http://rada.gov.ua/

Babyntsi (Ukrainian: Бабинці) is a rural settlement in Bucha Raion, Kyiv Oblast, northern Ukraine. It belongs to Bucha urban hromada, one of the hromadas of Ukraine. The population of the settlement was 2,627 as of the 2001 Ukrainian Census. Current population: 2,775 (2022 estimate).

== History ==
Babyntsi has the status of an urban-type settlement since 1938.

Until 18 July 2020, Babyntsi belonged to Borodianka Raion. The raion was abolished that day as part of the administrative reform of Ukraine, which reduced the number of raions of Kyiv Oblast to seven. The area of Borodianka Raion was merged into Bucha Raion.

On 26 January 2024, a new law entered into force which abolished the status of urban-type settlement, and Babyntsi became a rural settlement.

== Geography ==
The Hnilovid River, a right tributary of the Zdvizh, flows through the village.
