= Oleksandr Tkachenko (soldier) =

Ukrainian soldier (1989–2023)

- Олександр Ткаченко
- Born: Oleksandr Anatoliiovych Tkachenko; 5 March 1989; Sevastopol, Ukrainian SSR, Soviet Union
- Died: 9 November 2023 (aged 34); Sumy Oblast
- Other names: Sevas (Севас)
- Occupation: Soldier
- Awards: Order for Courage

Oleksandr Anatoliiovych Tkachenko (Ukrainian: Олександр Анатолійович Ткаченко; 5 March 1989 – 9 November 2023) was a Ukrainian soldier. He was a Master sergeant of the Armed Forces of Ukraine, and participant in the Russian-Ukrainian war.

== Biography ==
Oleksandr Tkachenko was born on 5 March 1989 in Sevastopol.

He received a degree in hairdressing. He worked in his specialty and later became a hiking instructor, taking tourists to the Crimean Mountains.

In 2013, he began his service in the Marines. After the occupation of his native Crimea, he moved to Mykolaiv. With the beginning of the Russian-Ukrainian war, he took part in the battles for Mariupol, the villages of Vodiane and Hranitne in Donetsk Oblast. During his vacations, he was an instructor at the Azov Regiment.

In 2017, after the end of his military contract, he moved to Irpin, Kyiv Oblast, with his family. He was engaged in farming.

After the full-scale Russian invasion, he joined the defense of the Irpin city community. He served as the commander of the first assault platoon of the Irpin volunteer company-tactical group, played an important role in the battles at the checkpoints of the Zhyraf shopping center and Karavan-Gala.

After the de-occupation of the Kyiv Oblast, he fought in other parts of the front. He died on 9 November 2023 in Sumy Oblast.

The funeral service for Oleksandr took place on 16 November 2023 near the crematorium of the Baikove Cemetery. On 22 November 2023, the coffin with his ashes was buried on the Alley of Memory of the Defenders of Ukraine at the cemetery in Irpin.

He is survived by his wife and three daughters.

== Awards ==
- Order for Courage, 3rd class (9 April 2015)
- Honorary Citizen of Irpin (4 April 2024, posthumously)
- Medal for Merit to the City of Irpin (2022)
- Badges for Military Valor (2017), For Courage (2022)
- Order of the Volunteer (2022)
