= Battle of Bucha =

Engagement in the 2022 invasion of Ukraine

- Part of the northern front of the Russian invasion of Ukraine
Date	First phase: 27 February – 12 March 2022 (1 week and 6 days) Second phase: 29–31 March 2022 (3 days)
Location	Bucha, Kyiv Oblast, Ukraine 50°32′47″N 30°14′6″E
Result	1st battle: Russian victory and occupation 2nd battle: Ukrainian victory and regained control

Belligerents
Russia	Ukraine

Units involved
Russian Armed Forces; Russian Airborne Forces; 76th Guards Air Assault Division; 234th Guards Air Assault Regiment; 56th Guards Air Assault Regiment; Russian Ground Forces; 35th Combined Arms Army; 64th Motor Rifle Brigade; 36th Combined Arms Army; National Guard of Russia; SOBR; OMON	Armed Forces of Ukraine: Ukrainian Ground Forces; Ukrainian Air Force; Irregular civilian volunteers (militia and guerillas): BuchaVarta

Casualties and losses
Hundreds killed At least 100 pieces of military equipment lost	Unknown
- Per Ukraine: 458 civilians killed Per United Nations: 73 civilians killed

The Battle of Bucha was part of the Kyiv offensive in the Russian invasion of Ukraine for control of the city of Bucha. The combatants were elements of the Russian Armed Forces and Ukrainian Ground Forces. The battle lasted from 27 February to 31 March 2022 and ended with the withdrawal of Russian forces. The battle was part of a larger tactic to encircle Kyiv, the capital city of Ukraine.

The armed forces of Ukraine resisted the Russian advance in the capital's western suburbs of Irpin, Bucha, and Hostomel. Bucha was among the locations that the Kyiv Oblast State Administration named as the most dangerous places in the Kyiv Oblast. After Russian forces withdrew from Bucha and Ukrainian forces regain the city's control, the uncovered atrocities committed by the Russian military, known as Bucha massacre, attracted international attention.

== Prelude ==
On 25 February, Russian forces advanced on the suburb of Hostomel and its airport from the northwest after partially breaking through Ukrainian defenses at Ivankiv, capturing the airport and establishing a foothold in the town. Though there was still ongoing Ukrainian resistance in Hostomel, Russian forces began to advance south to capture the neighboring cities of Irpin and Bucha with the goal of encircling Kyiv. Later that day Russian soldiers were seen looting an apartment building near Bucha.

== Battle ==
=== Initial fighting ===
==== February ====
On 25 February, due a lack of communications with the main invasion command and over-optimistic planning, a convoy of OMON and SOBR units from Kemerovo Oblast accidentally separated from the invasion forces and ended up charging at Kyiv by themselves. As the convoy cruised through Bucha it was ambushed at a bridge over the Irpin River, and the unarmored and under-equipped units were completely destroyed. Reportedly, of the 80 soldiers in the convoy, only 3 wounded men survived.

On 27 February, Russian ground forces advanced into Bucha. The Russian force was composed of paratroopers, tanks, military engineering units, and reserves from the 36th Combined Arms Army. The Russian force also had units of the Special Rapid Response Unit (SOBR) and the Special Purpose Mobile Unit (OMON), two special police forces within the National Guard of Russia. Russian artillery bombarded the city, damaging several buildings and infrastructure. Some residents lost access to water, gas, and electricity due to the shelling.

Some elements of the Russian force were able to breakthrough Bucha and advanced towards the neighboring city of Irpin. A Russian armored unit was recorded attacking a memorial for the War in Afghanistan in Bucha; the memorial is shaped like an APC. Andriy Tsaplienko, a Ukrainian journalist, later reported that Russian forces attacked a civilian vehicle, killing a man and injuring another.

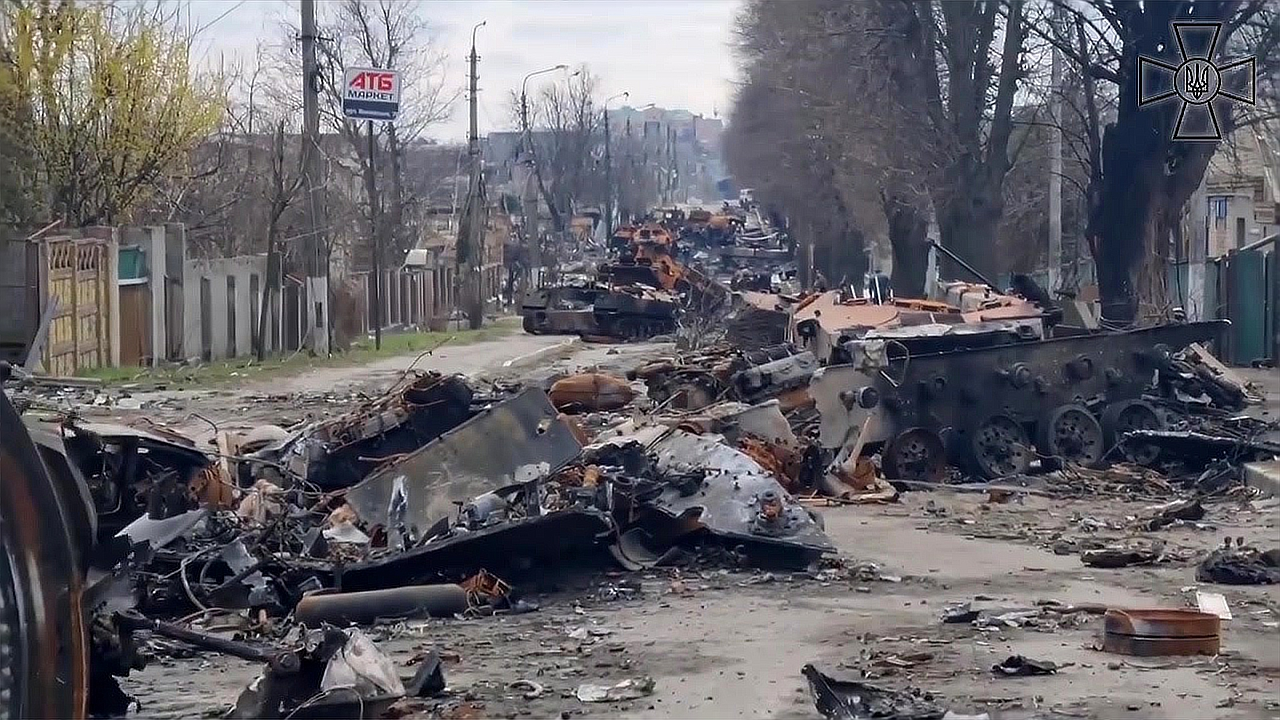
Destroyed Russian column on Vokzalna Street of Bucha.

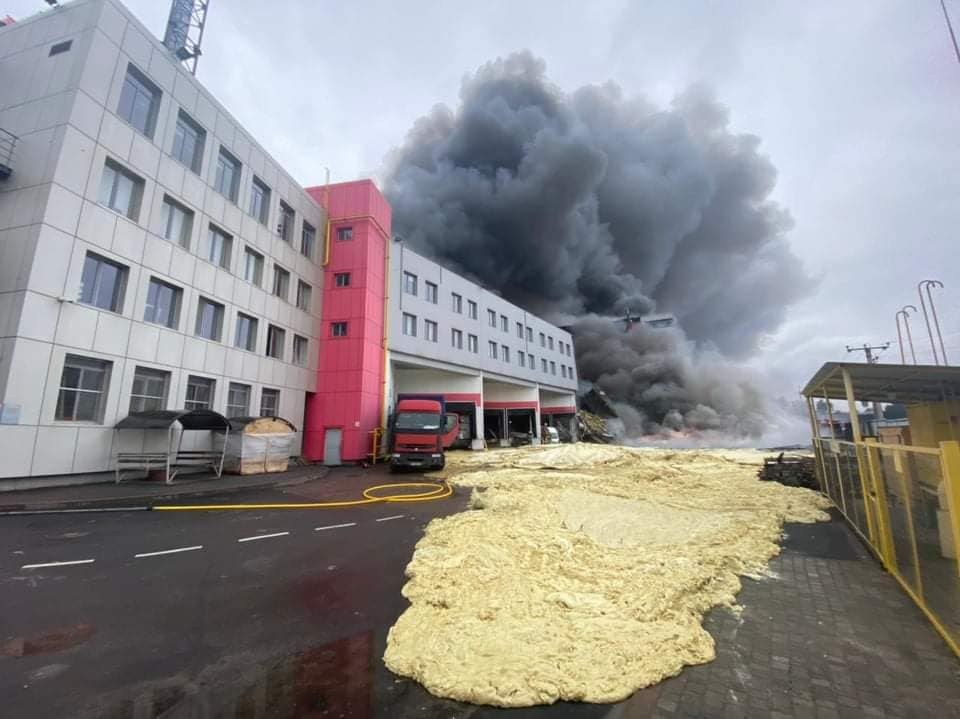
An industrial building in Chaiky village near Bucha, which held spray foam is hit by a Russian missile.

Ukrainian forces used rocket and artillery bombardments and airstrikes to halt the Russian advances into Bucha. The State Special Communications Service of Ukraine reported that Ukrainian artillery had shelled a convoy of Russian armored vehicles, with the Ukrainian government claiming that over 100 units of Russian equipment had been destroyed. Ukrainian forces destroyed a bridge connecting Bucha and Irpin, killing an OMON officer and preventing Russian forces from advancing into Irpin.

Oleksiy Arestovych, a Ukrainian official, claimed that some residents of Bucha began fighting Russian forces, throwing Molotov cocktails at Russian vehicles and soldiers. Anton Herashchenko, another Ukrainian official, stated that the residents attacked a column of Russian armored vehicles, setting at least one vehicle on fire.

Later on 27 February, Ukrainian authorities warned the residents of Bucha not to get on buses that were evacuating out of the city and asked them to remain hidden inside their homes, as Ukrainian officials had not initiated any evacuation procedures. Ukrainian officials claimed that it was part of a plan by Russian forces, wherein the Russians would use the civilians as human shields by following behind the buses, in order to gain entry into Kyiv.

On 28 February 2022, Anatoliy Fedoruk, the mayor of Bucha, published a video showing smoldering Russian vehicles. Fedoruk claimed that the Ukrainians suffered no casualties from the skirmish.

==== March ====
On 1 March, photos of destroyed and abandoned Russian equipment began circulating through Ukrainian news media, with some describing Bucha as a graveyard for the destroyed Russian equipment.

On 2 March 2022, the Ukrainian government began sending humanitarian aid towards Bucha. The following day, the Kyiv Oblast State Administration announced evacuations in both Bucha and Irpin. More than 1,500 women and children were reported to have evacuated by train, while 250 were evacuated by bus. Ukrainian officials reported that the evacuations were complicated as some railway tracks had been destroyed during fighting.

Later on 3 March, the Ukrainian Ground Forces announced that Ukrainian forces recaptured Bucha, posting a video of Ukrainian soldiers raising the Ukrainian flag near the city council building. Ukrainian emergency teams restored electricity to the city. Russian forces continued to fight inside Bucha, and were repulsed by Ukrainian forces and pushed into the city's outskirts.

On 4 March 2022, Fedoruk confirmed that the city remained under Ukrainian control, despite Russian forces continuously launching attacks. Russian forces killed three unarmed Ukrainian civilians who had just delivered dog food to a dog shelter and were on their way back home in a car.

By 5 March 2022, Russian forces continued to attack Bucha. Later, Arestovych stated that Russian forces had captured both Bucha and Hostomel, and were not allowing civilians to evacuate. At around 7:15 am that day, a pair of cars carrying two families were spotted by Russian soldiers who proceeded to open fire at the convoy, killing a man in the second vehicle. The front car was hit by gunfire, setting it on fire and killing two children and their mother. On the same day, Oleksandr Kyslyuk, a scholar fluent in 20 languages, translator into Ukrainian of Aristotle, Tacitus and Aquinas and many other classical sources, was killed when a Russian tank targeted his home in Bucha.

On 6 March 2022, Russia intensified its shelling of the city, resulting in some civilian casualties. The Bucha City Council reported that civilians were taking shelter in basements, and that the city was unable to receive humanitarian aid due to the constant bombardment. Radio Svoboda reported that the occupied city was running out of supplies and that Russian soldiers were killing civilians. The following day, Russian forces deployed three armored units at Bucha, in preparation for an advance towards Irpin. Later, Volodymyr Karplyuk, the former mayor of Irpin, stated that Russian forces had destroyed the Glass Plastic and Fiber Research Institute in Bucha, releasing fumes of acetone and other chemicals.

On 8 March 2022, Fedoruk stated that Ukrainian forces were still fighting in Bucha and had managed to regain territory. He also stated that Russian forces held control of all main highways in the city, intensified shelling, and would not allow residents of Bucha to leave their homes. Later on 8 March, the Russian occupiers allowed civilians to go outside for a limited period of time in order to remove bodies and cook food. The city still did not have electricity, as Russian forces held all of the electrical substations.

On 9 March 2022, Ukrainian forces conducted a large-scale evacuation across Kyiv Oblast, including in Bucha. Up to 20,000 civilians were evacuated in Kyiv Oblast. The Kyiv Oblast State Administration described the situation in Bucha as tense amidst the fighting and evacuation.

On 12 March 2022, the Bucha City Council announced that Russian forces had fully occupied the city. The council stated that the Russian forces would not allow residents to leave their homes, and would sometimes shoot at civilians. Despite the takeover, some civilians were able to successfully evacuate from the city in a convoy of 20 buses.

=== Russian control ===
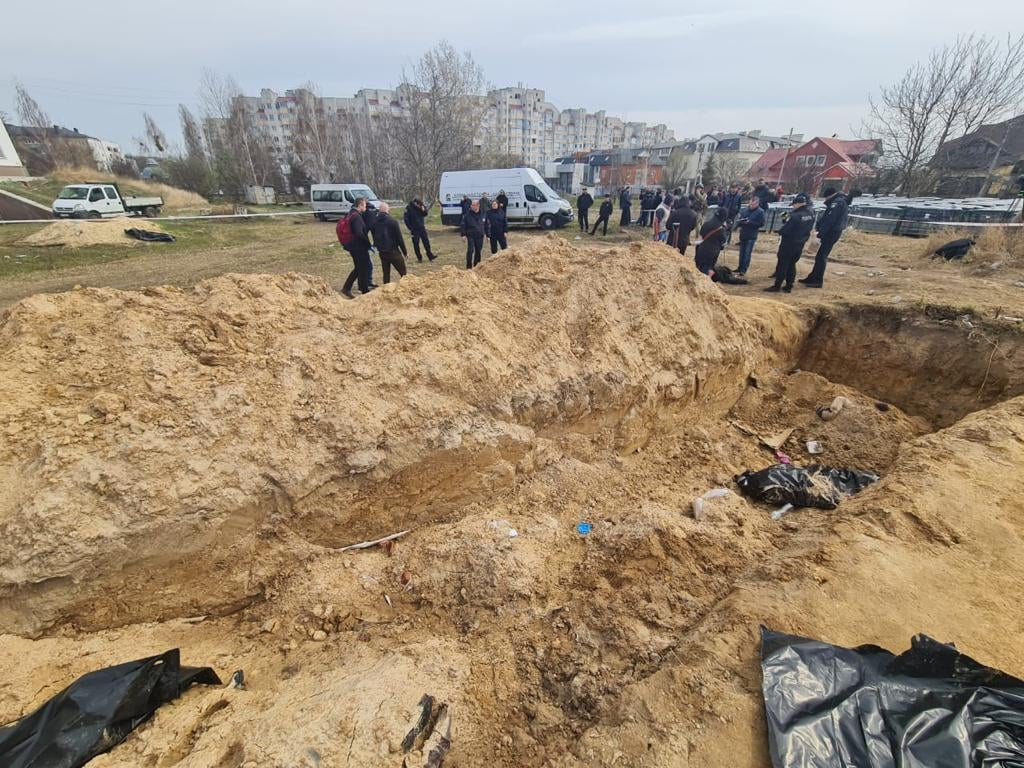
Exhumation of bodies from the mass grave near a church in Bucha, 8 April 2022.

On 13 March, residents buried 67 people in a mass grave near a church in Bucha. Those buried were killed by Russian artillery, and some bodies could not be identified. Later, some Russian soldiers were seen looting houses in the city.

By 15 March, Russian forces began occupying the city hall and had captured employees at the building. The civilians were released the following day. Meanwhile, Obozrevatel published a video showing abandoned Russian armored vehicles parked in residential driveways and garages.

On 16 March, according to the Ukrainian military, its forces launched a counter-attack against Russian-held locations around Kyiv, including in Bucha.

On 22 March, the head of the Kyiv Regional Military Administration, Oleksandr Pavlyuk, stated that Bucha and Hostomel were under the control of the Russian army and that no Ukrainian offensive actions could be taken there at the time. The main task of the Ukrainian military was to prevent Russian forces from crossing the Irpin River.

=== Ukraine regains control ===
External videos
- YouTube logo
- Special forces of the National Police are cleaning up the city of Bucha, video by National Police of Ukraine Archived May 14, 2023, at the Wayback Machine

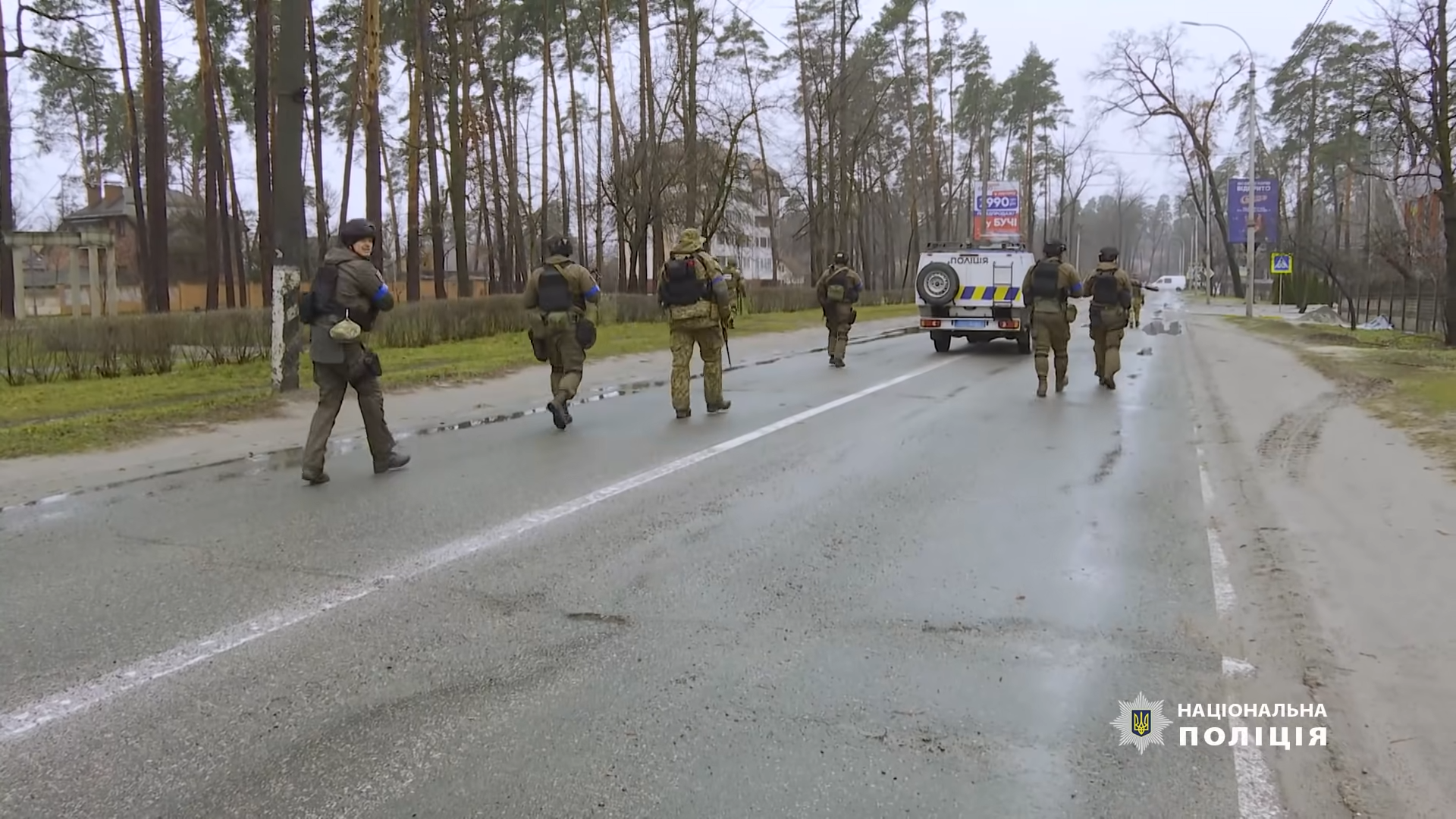
Ukrainian police enter Bucha on 2 April

On 29 March, Russian Deputy Defence Minister Alexander Fomin announced that the Russian military would reduce its activity near Kyiv and Chernihiv. By 31 March, Ukrainian forces were moving into Bucha amid a general Russian withdrawal in the area, resulting in heavy fighting with local Russian troops.

The following day, Oleksandr Pavliuk, head of the Ukrainian military administration for the Kyiv region, announced that the Bucha district had mostly been retaken. According to him, Russian troops were trying to retreat, while the Ukrainians kept attacking them. Combat continued north of Bucha and in the Hostomel–Bucha–Vorzel axis. Meanwhile, mayor Anatolii Fedoruk and the Institute for the Study of War reported that Bucha had been fully retaken from Russian forces as of 31 March.

== Mass killings in Bucha ==
After Ukrainian forces regained control of Bucha, reports and testimonies of war crimes committed by the Russian military began to circulate. Agence France-Presse journalists found 20 bodies lying on a street in Bucha. At least one of them had their hands tied and all of the casualties were male. According to mayor Anatoly Fedoruk around 280 people had been buried in a mass grave.

The Guardian reported that after Ukrainian forces recaptured Kyiv Oblast, "[they] were met with shocking devastation upon their return into the area: bodies in the streets, evidence of execution-style killings of civilians, mass graves and slain children."

According to The Times and The Washington Post, eighteen mutilated bodies of murdered men, women and children were found in a basement. The bodies showed evidence of torture; cut-off ears and teeth pulled out. Corpses of other killed civilians were left in the road, allegedly some of them booby-trapped with explosives by Russian soldiers as decoys before they retreated.

Residents and the town mayor confirmed that the victims had been killed by Russian troops. Many of the victims appeared to have been going about their daily routines, walking dogs, or carrying shopping bags. The bodies were whole, indicating that they had been shot, rather than killed by explosive munitions. Footage showed civilians dead, with their hands bound. Other footage showed a dead man, next to his bicycle. Pets and other animals had been shot.

Evidence appeared to indicate that the Russians had singled out Ukrainian civilian men and killed them in an organised fashion, with many of their bodies in particular found dead with their hands tied behind their backs. On 2 April, an AFP reporter stated he had seen at least twenty bodies of civilians lying in the streets of Bucha, with two of the bodies having tied hands, implying a summary execution. Fedoruk said that these individuals had all been shot in the back of the head.

Residents, talking to Human Rights Watch following the retreat of the Russian forces, described the treatment of people in the town during the short occupation: Russian soldiers went door to door, questioning people, destroying their possessions, and looting their clothes to wear them themselves. Civilians were fired upon when leaving their homes for food and water, and would be ordered back into their homes by occupying Russian troops, despite a lack of basic necessities such as water and heat due to destruction of local infrastructure.

Snipers fired upon civilians. Russian armed vehicles would randomly fire into buildings in the town. Russian troops refused medical aid to civilians they injured. A mass grave was dug for local victims, and the occupying troops carried out extrajudicial executions.

CNN, the BBC, and Bild have released video documentations of numerous dead bodies of civilians lying in the streets and backyards in Bucha, some of them with tied arms or legs. Atrocities in Bucha, including at least one case of summary execution, was also documented by the independent rights group Human Rights Watch.
