= Russian Kyiv convoy =

2022 column of Russian military vehicles in Ukraine

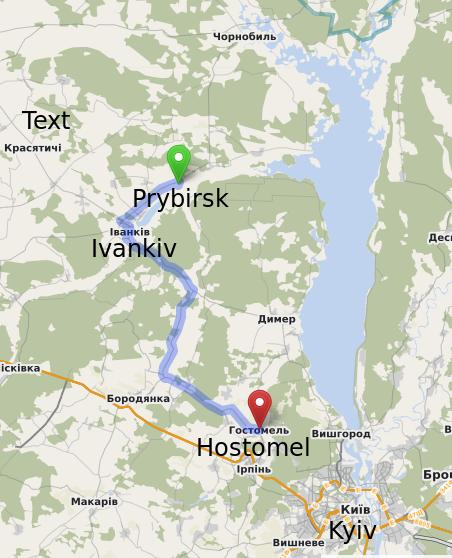
Approximate location of the Russian Kyiv convoy according to The Economist.

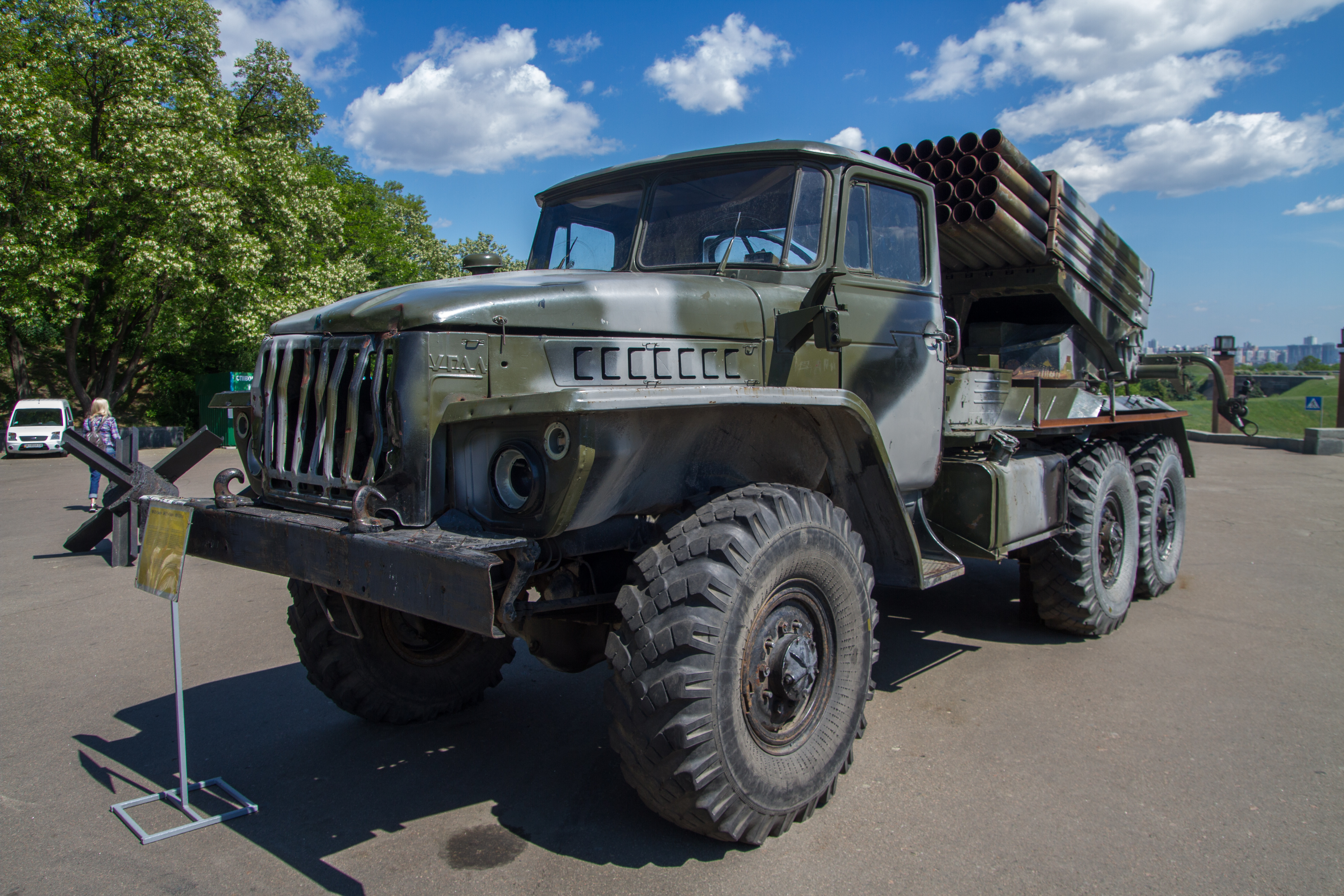
One BM-21 Grad Russian military vehicle, similar to the type used in the Kyiv convoy

The Russian Kyiv convoy was a column of Russian military vehicles stretching some 64 kilometres (40 mi) in Kyiv Oblast from Prybirsk to Hostomel via Ivankiv involved in the Russian invasion of Ukraine beginning on 24 February 2022. It initially threatened Kyiv, but then halted for reasons that remain unclear. Commentators have suggested that the large number of soldiers and vehicles may have had issues with fuel and food shortages, and may have also been delayed by attacks from the Ukrainian military.

On 4 March 2022, The Economist declared that the slow pace and seemingly disorganised military formation was representative of Russia's problems in the war in general.

On 2 April 2022, the whole of Kyiv Oblast, where the column was deployed, was declared free of Russian troops by the Ukrainian Ministry of Defense after Russian troops had left the area. Three days before, the United States Department of Defense stated that the convoy had "never really accomplished their mission."

== Background ==
=== Three-day war plan ===
Russia hoped to take Kyiv rapidly and to remove the Ukrainian government, allowing the installation of a pro-Russian government. Russia positioned a large force in Belarus, which crossed the border and invaded the north of Ukraine, while other forces attacked from the east of Ukraine (occupied territories of the Donbas) and from Crimea in the south. Whether Russia's plan from the start was originally intended as a rapid decapitating attack was disputed primarily by the Russian side.

The earliest documented mention of this plan was 26 April 2014 article by Russian military experts Konstantin Sivkov and Yuri Valyuevskiy who asserted that Russian armed forces can easily reach Kyiv in "two-three days". Putin himself asserted back in September 2014 that Russian forces "could take Ukraine in two weeks". Aleksandr Lukashenko had already stated that, in case of war, Kyiv would be taken in "3–4 days". Margarita Simonyan, editor-in-chief of the Russian state-controlled broadcaster RT, had made similar remarks about Russia being able to "defeat Ukraine in 2 days". The narrative of the planned "three day" capture of Kyiv was further reinforced on 2 March, when the Security Service of Ukraine (SBU) repeated the claim following its release of a video showing a captured Russian soldier claiming that his unit was sent into Ukraine with food supplies for only three days. Documents found inside Russian tanks mention how the "special military operation" would conclude in ten days. Ukraine also captured "flagship" tanks – as used in parades – along with military parade uniforms, suggesting that Russia expected to stage a victory parade in Kyiv after a quick conquest. Three days after the invasion began, RIA Novosti, a Russian state news agency, mistakenly published an article entitled "Russia's Coming and the New World," which was prepared in advance in anticipation of a Russian victory. It announced that Russia had won the Russo-Ukrainian war and that "Ukraine had returned to Russia". Zelenskyy also admitted that he had received an ultimatum to be replaced with Viktor Medvedchuk.

Ukrainian and Western analysts tentatively assessed that Putin seemed to have assumed that the Russian Armed Forces would be capable of capturing the Ukrainian capital city of Kyiv within days. This assessment eventually led to the commonly reached conclusion that "taking Kyiv in three days" had been the original objective or expectation of the invasion.

== Observations ==
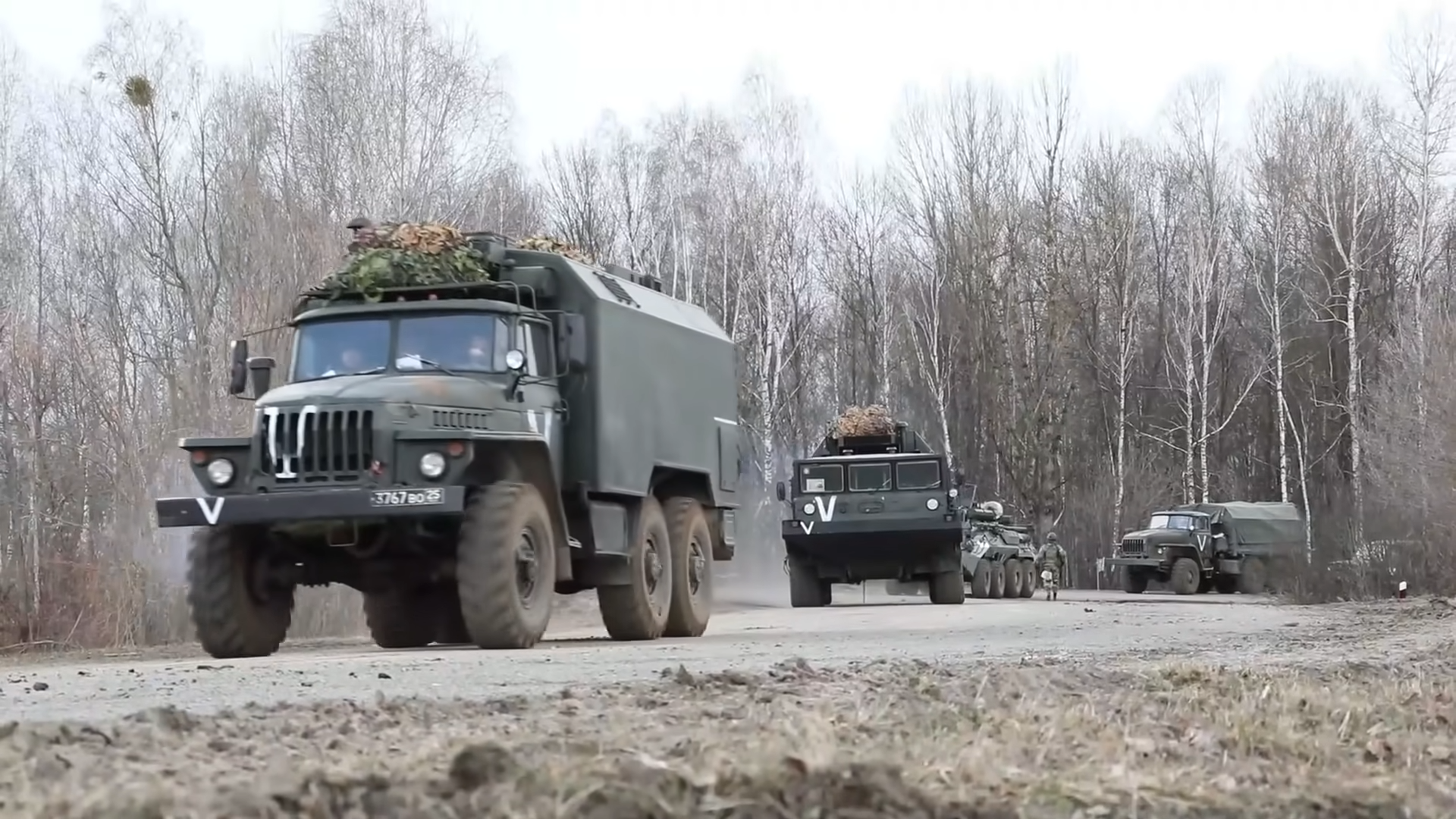
A Russian convoy during the Kyiv offensive in March 2022

=== Movements ===
Maxar Technologies first spotted the Kyiv convoy in satellite images on Monday 28 February 2022. The column of vehicles crossed into Ukraine from Belarus and moved south through Prybirsk, and then Ivankiv. The convoy was apparently heading towards Kyiv, the capital of Ukraine, as part of preparation for the projected battle of Kyiv, presumably with the aim of besieging and threatening the city. However, according to a 7 March 2022 intelligence update from the UK Defence Ministry, "The main body of the large Russian column advancing on Kyiv remains over 30 km from the centre of the city having been delayed by staunch Ukrainian resistance, mechanical breakdown and congestion." Time reported that by 1 March, it was 25 kilometres (16 mi) from the centre of the city, and it was then reported as stalling between 25 and 30 kilometres outside Kyiv.

=== Composition and size ===
On 2 March, the convoy was estimated to have held up to 15,000 troops. The formation itself was made up of a variety of military vehicles, which satellite footage shows vehicles parked three abreast across wider sections of the road. The convoy has been noted for its size, stretching about 65 kilometres (40 mi). Satellite photos of the convoy indicate the column is composed of Russian supply trucks, troops, weapons, and artillery. Reuters revised the size of the convoy, estimating it to be larger than previously considered, at 64 kilometres (40 mi) long, with The Independent estimating that it had grown to 64 kilometres (40 mi) long by 1 March, from its initial size estimate of 27 kilometres (17 mi).

=== Air cover ===
The convoy was protected by mobile anti-aircraft systems. It is not known how effective these were, because elsewhere, Ukrainian Baykar Bayraktar TB2 drones had successfully attacked and "destroyed three [Russian] SAM missile systems and four 152mm artillery pieces, along with more than 10 trucks and several tanks" by 1 March. The effectiveness of the Turkish-manufactured TB2 drones has been partly attributed to the Russian failure to achieve air supremacy in the opening phase of the war, as well as poor Russian coordination and communications. Ukrainian commanders were therefore considering using them against the convoy, but they had relatively few deployable TB2 drones, few military personnel were trained to operate them effectively, and Russian forces might be able to track them and shoot them down via their radio emissions. Moreover, by 3 March, aviation researcher Justin Bronk stated that Russian forces appeared to have moved more air defence systems forward, including around the column. Bronk argued that the convoy had thus become 'a very, very difficult target for the Ukrainian Air Force', because it was within reach of the S-400 missile systems along the Belarusian–Ukrainian border, excluding almost any conventional crewed aircraft attacks on the convoy (except perhaps very low-level flying, visual-targeting operations).

== Stall ==
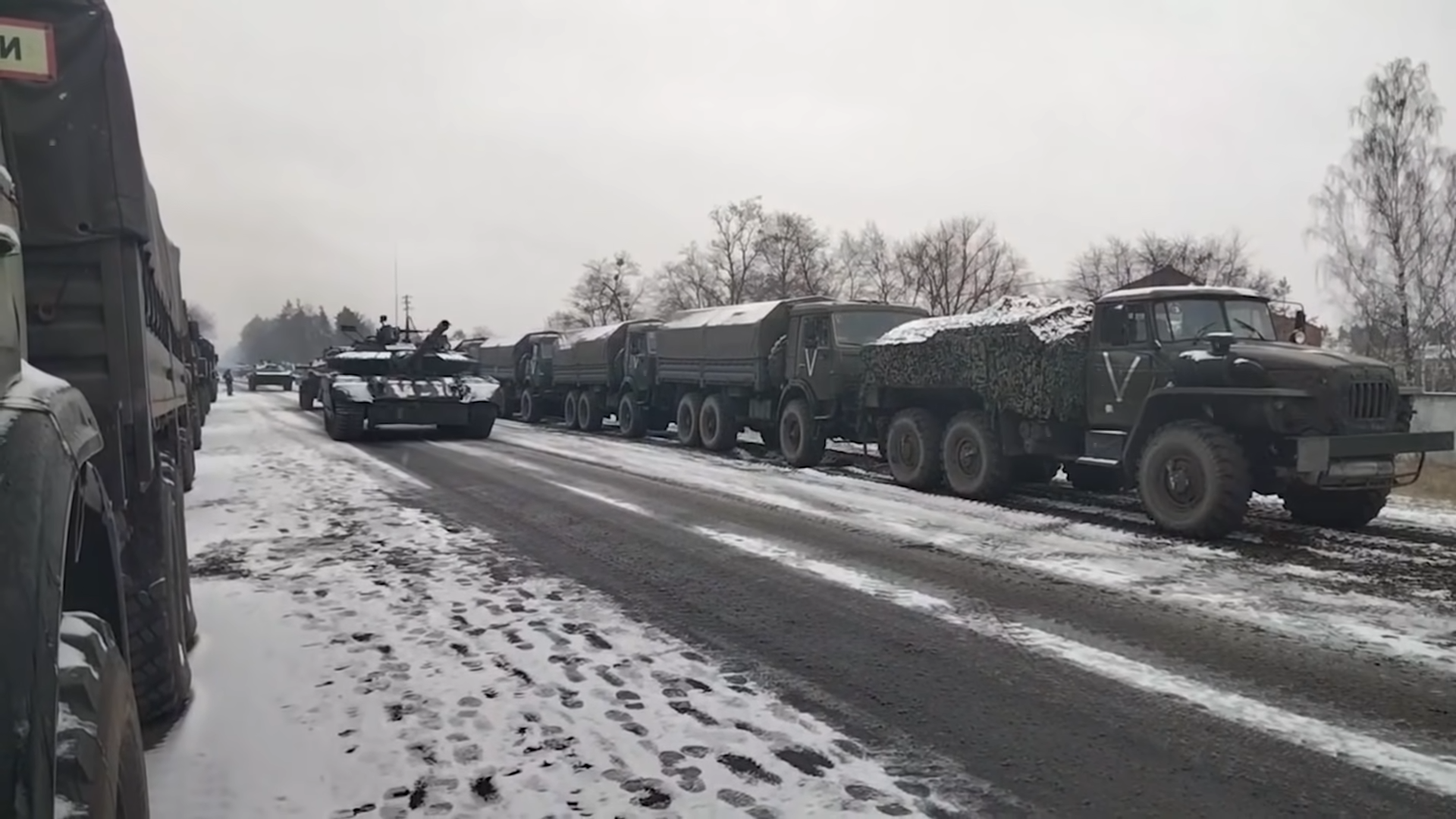
A Russian armored column in the Kyiv region, 7 March 2022

The convoy stalled eight days into the war, at approximately 30 kilometers (19 mi) from the center of the city of Kyiv; as of 7 March 2022, according to U.S. defense officials, the column had not moved at all for a few days.

=== Reasons for malfunction ===
There has been much discussion about why the convoy stalled. The UK Defence Ministry noted that by 7 March, it had been "delayed by staunch Ukrainian resistance, mechanical breakdown and congestion. The column has made little discernible progress in over three days."

- Fuel and food shortages: Much commentary theorises that the convoy stalled due to fuel and food shortages. In the wider conflict, fuel and supply issues have been apparent, with trucks and vehicles running out of fuel, leading to them being abandoned. In some cases, Russian soldiers asked local Ukrainians for food or fuel for their vehicles. Prior to the war, there were reports of military personnel selling diesel fuel, part of a "long-standing tradition of corruption in fuel supply".
- Weather, terrain, and congestion: Other media suggests that vehicles became stuck in mud, triggering traffic jams. There have been a number of examples of Russian vehicles being unable to travel across muddy or boggy terrain. In this case, the terrain appears not to have frozen solid due to the mild winter that year. Images have been widely published on social media of heavy-tracked vehicles that Russian soldiers abandoned after they became trapped in the mud. This issue was particularly notable in northern Ukraine, made worse as the Rasputitsa, the seasonal thaw during springtime, takes hold in more areas.
- Ukrainian attacks: Others have suggested that the convoy stalled as a result of attacks by the Ukrainian military, though little verified information has been published about this. It has been suggested that the column was attacked by artillery, Turkish-made drones, or ground ambushes. On 28 March, it was reported that the convoy had been stopped by Ukrainian drone attacks.
- Maintenance: Poor vehicle maintenance may have contributed to the convoy's failure. Trent Telenko, previously a Pentagon staff specialist and military history writer, and Karl Ruth, government advisor and economist, both supported the maintenance theory, with Telenko also noting that the Russian army "simply cannot risk them off-road during the [mud season]."
- Waiting: Other commentary theorised that the convoy was simply waiting to set up a forward base of operations.
- Overall bad planning and disorganisation: Janes Information Services theorised that overall Russian unpreparedness for the invasion of Ukraine, tied with the fact that Russia has not operated at this scale since WW2, has resulted in communications problems, and different units not being able to work together, resulting in the stall and apparent disorganisation of the armoured column.

== Strategic analysis ==
Commentary discussing the column soon after its appearance assumed it was originally a column that would enter Ukraine, move south to Kyiv, and then encircle it with a siege.

On 3 March 2022, CNN cited former Finnish defense intelligence expert Martti Kari in saying that, strategically, the stalled column presented two main threats to its ongoing campaign. Firstly that the column, now stalled, could be an easy target, suffering attacks that may eventually destroy it. Secondly the stalled column, as the situation got worse for those within it, would cause morale problems clearly not just for those in the column, but other Russian troops that heard of its plight.

Some commentary has indicated that the troops in the convoy contained many supply trucks, and the soldiers in the convoy survived by eating the supplies in the trucks, which the convoy had intended to deliver to other units. Some have seen its plodding pace and logistical issues as emblematic of Russia's efforts in the war in general.

The column was either anticipated to form part of a planned siege of Kyiv, with the vehicles and troops fanning out to take up positions, serve as a supply convoy to replenish food and ammunition to troops already engaged in the area, or set up a forward base of operations for attacks on Kyiv.

== Ukrainian attacks ==
=== "Attack the first" method ===
The ABC reported on 3 March that ground attacks with anti-tank weapons had destroyed numerous vehicles. It noted that the attacking forces had deliberately attacked the start of the column, destroying vehicles and creating ad-hoc roadblocks, with the following vehicles unable to pass. On 11 March, a senior U.S. defense official stated that Ukrainian forces had made several attacks on the convoy with ground fire, such as shoulder-fired FGM-148 Javelin anti-tank missiles delivered by Western countries. Ukrainian units have set up various obstacles and roadblocks in its anticipated path, including "parking trams, buses and large vehicles".

Ukrainian snipers engaged troops from their position and killed individual Russian soldiers. High-level Russian officials at the convoy were killed by Ukrainian snipers. On 3 March, Major General Andrei Sukhovetsky, deputy commander of the 41st Combined Arms Army of the Central Military District, was killed by Ukrainian sniper fire when he ventured to the front of the stalled convoy. At that point, he was the highest-ranking Russian official killed.

Ukrainian Aerorozvidka group also assisted with their own-built drones, some capable of dropping up to 1.5 kg bombs and firing rocket-propelled anti-tank grenades.

== Redeployment and retreat ==
By 11 March 2022, some elements had broken off and deployed into firing positions. While the bulk of the convoy remained on the road, some parts, including artillery, had left the main column and started taking up positions near Hostomel. Other sections took up positions in Lubyanka, and nearby forests. On 16 March, the US Department of Defense (DoD) said that the Russian convoy north of Kyiv was still stuck in place, and had not progressed – however by 31 March the DoD stated they could not confirm the column still existed and noted that ultimately "...[t]hey never really accomplished their mission."

In a report publishing in December 2022, the Main Directorate of Intelligence of Ukraine indicated that despite elaborate planning, Ukrainian intelligence sources showed that "Russian military units involved in the planned invasion were only supplied with food, ammunition, and fuel for three days, indicating that Russia may have seriously underestimated the situation." On 2 April 2022, the whole of Kyiv Oblast, where the military column was deployed, was declared free of invaders by the Ukrainian Ministry of Defense after Russian troops had left the area.

== See also ==
- Delta (situational awareness system)
- Highway of Death (Ukraine)

== Links ==
- Колона on YouTube
