= Blystavytsia =

Rural locality in Kyiv Oblast, Ukraine

Blystavytsia Блиставиця
- Village
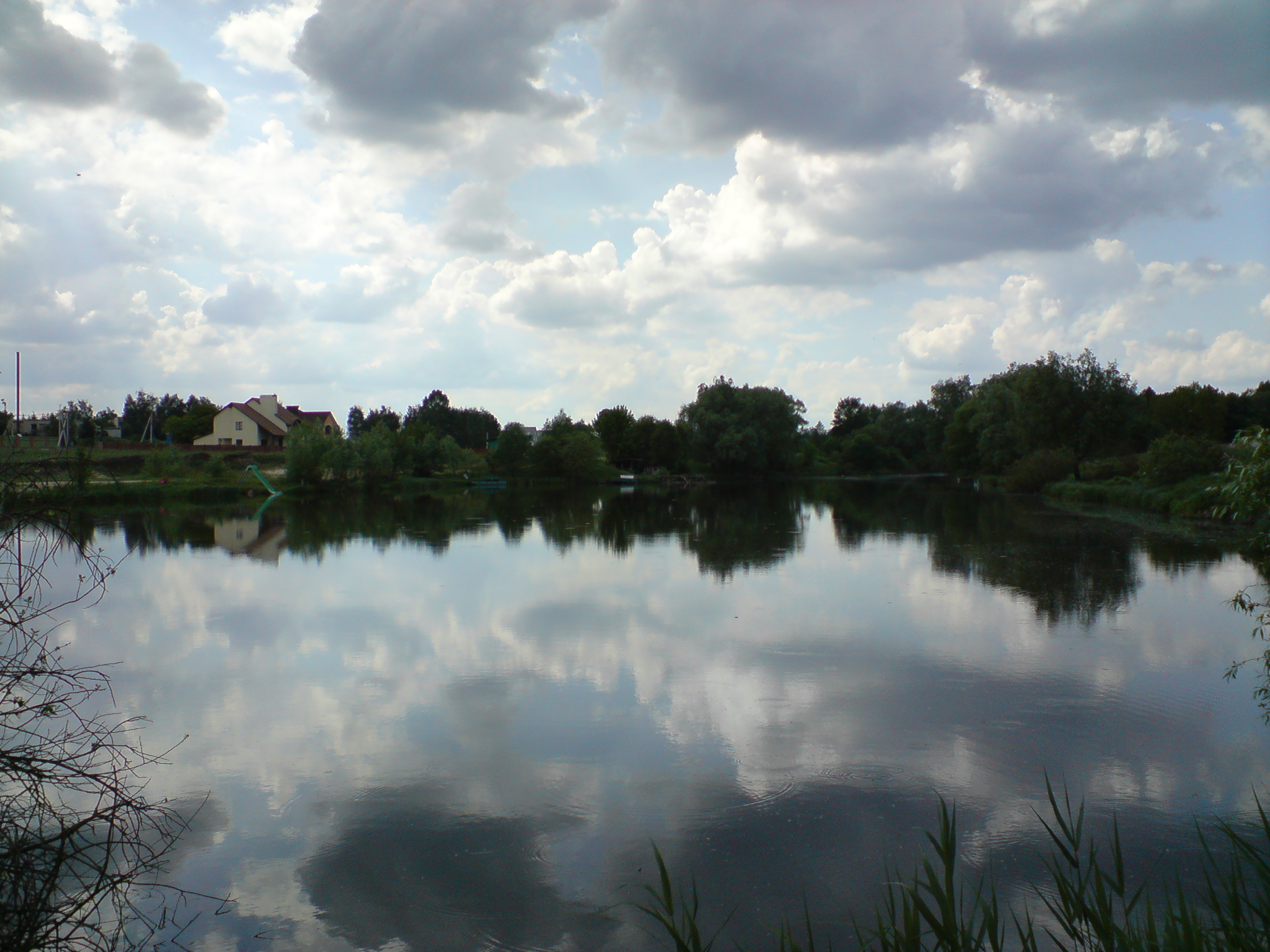

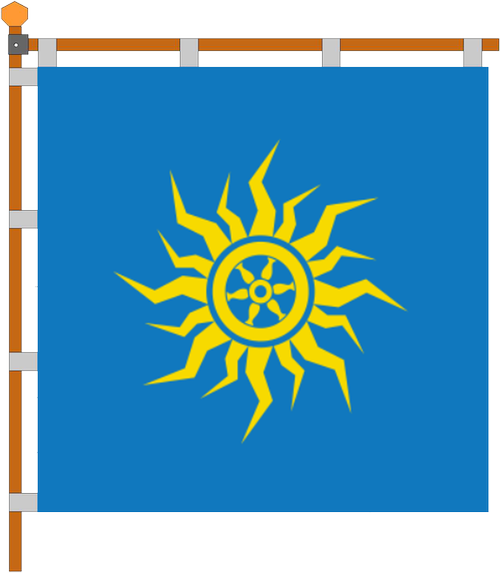
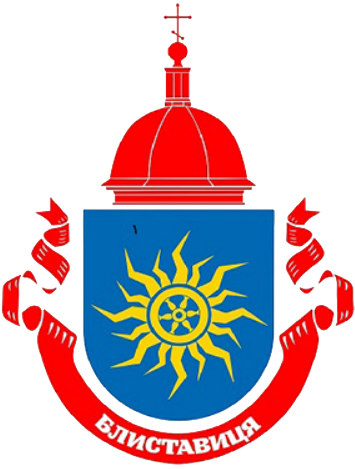
- Flag Coat of arms

- Location of Blystavytsia within Ukraine Blystavytsia (Ukraine)
- Coordinates: 50°36′02″N 30°10′56″E
- Country: Ukraine
- Oblast: Kyiv Oblast
- District: Bucha Raion

Area
  - Total: 39.07 km^{2} (15.09 sq mi)
- Elevation: 152 m (499 ft)

Population (2001 census)
  - Total: 1,172
  - Density: 30.00/km^{2} (77.69/sq mi)
- Time zone: UTC+2 (EET)
  - Summer (DST): UTC+3 (EEST)
- Postal code: 07835
- Area code: +380 4577

Blystavytsia (Ukrainian: Блиставиця) is a village in Bucha Raion (district) in Kyiv Oblast of Ukraine. It belongs to Bucha urban hromada, one of the hromadas of Ukraine.

Blystavytsia was previously located in Borodianka Raion. The raion was abolished on 18 July 2020 as part of the administrative reform of Ukraine, which reduced the number of raions of Kyiv Oblast to seven. The area of Borodianka Raion was merged into Bucha Raion.
