= Vorzel =

Rural locality in Kyiv Oblast, Ukraine

Vorzel Ворзель
- Rural settlement
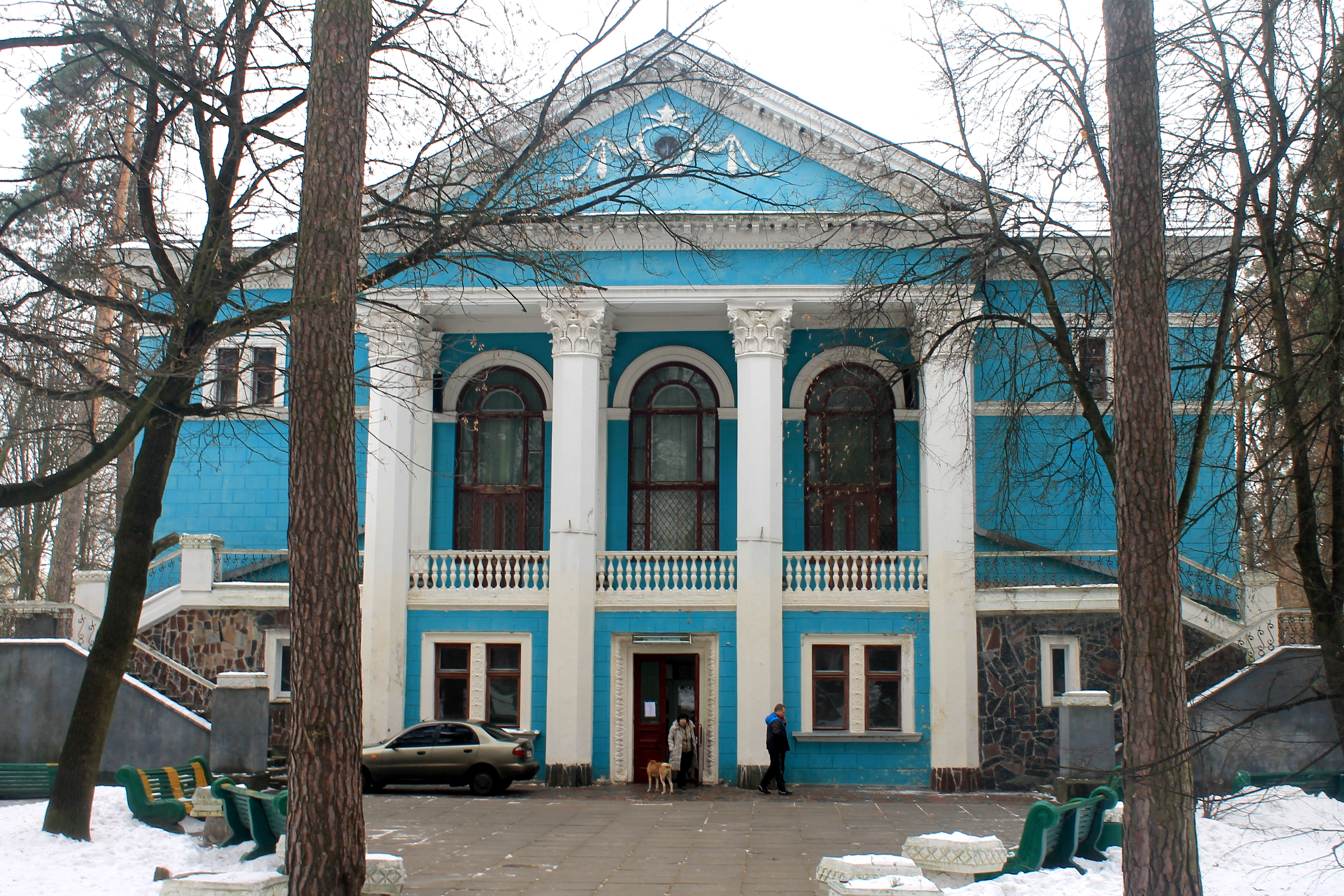
- Vorzel. Sanatorium "Ukraine"

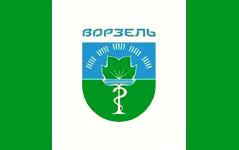
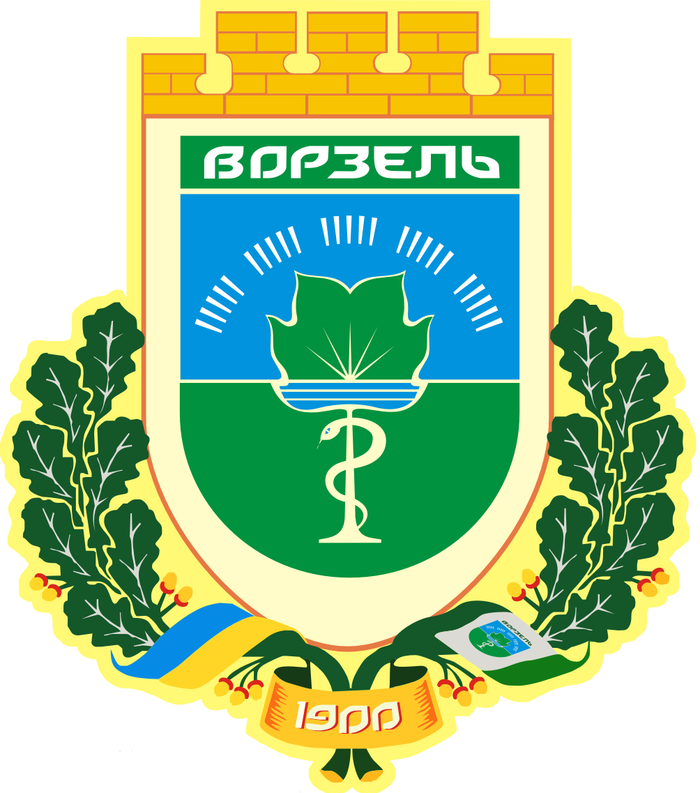
- Flag Seal

- Location within Kyiv Oblast Location within Ukraine
- Coordinates: 50°33′N 30°9′E
- Country: Ukraine
- Oblast: Kyiv Oblast
- Raion: Bucha Raion
- Hromada: Bucha urban hromada
- Founded: 1938

Population (2001)
  - Total: 6,152
- Postal code: 08296
- Area code: +380 4597
- Website: http://vorzel.kiev.ua

Vorzel (Ukrainian: Ворзель, [ˈwɔrzelʲ]) is a rural settlement in Bucha Raion, Kyiv Oblast of Ukraine. It belongs to Bucha urban hromada, one of the hromadas of Ukraine. In modern times Vorzel has been known as a resort settlement housing numerous sanatoria and hotels. Population: 6,859 (2022 estimate).

It is home to Scripture Union's International Youth Camp.

== History ==
The village was formed in 1905 (as the memorial plaque on the building of the Vorzel railway station says) on the 37th kilometer of the section of the Kovel railway, thanks to the collaboration of local landowners Krasovsky, Chaika, von Derviz, Saratovsky, Pekhovsky and Kicheeva.

During World War II the village was occupied by German troops on 22 September 1941. Two years later, in November 1943, Soviet troops took it back for the USSR without a fight.

Until 18 July 2020, Vorzel belonged to Irpin Municipality. In July 2020, as part of the administrative reform of Ukraine, which reduced the number of raions of Kyiv Oblast to seven, Irpin Municipality was merged into Bucha Raion.

During the Russian-Ukrainian war the village was shelled and then occupied by Russian troops in late February 2022. Until March 30, Vorzel was blocked by the Russian occupiers, leaving most houses without electricity, heat and water. It was only on March 9 that the evacuation of local residents began. Among the evacuees was the Ukrainian composer Ihor Poklad.

Until 26 January 2024, Vorzel was designated urban-type settlement. On this day, a new law entered into force which abolished this status, and Vorzel became a rural settlement.

== Population ==
=== Language ===
Distribution of the population by native language according to the 2001 census:

Language	Percentage
Ukrainian	87%
Russian	12.7%
other/undecided	0.3%

== Notable people ==
- Serhiy Shapoval (born 1990), Ukrainian footballer
- Oleksandr Usyk (born 1988), Ukrainian boxer

== Gallery ==
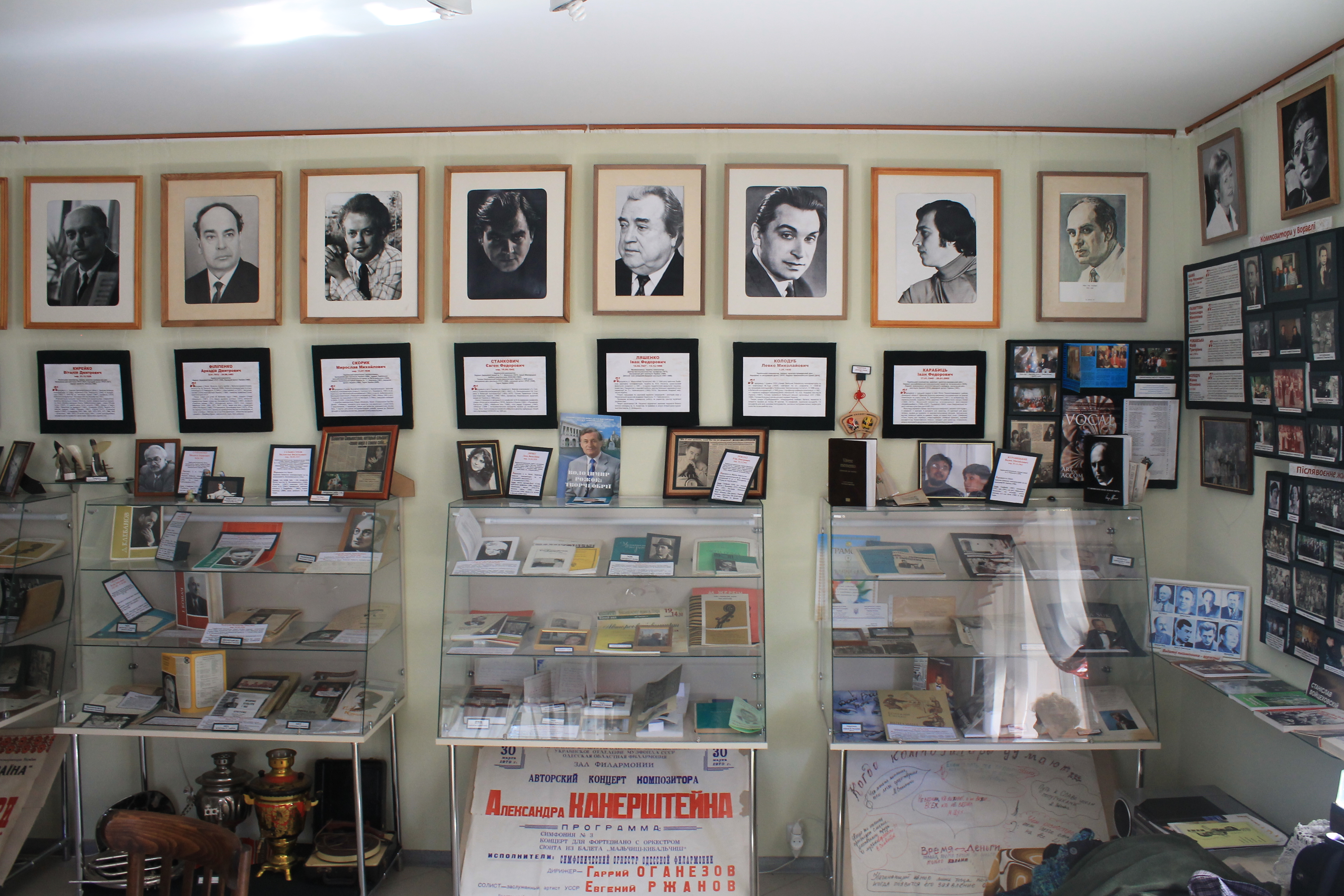

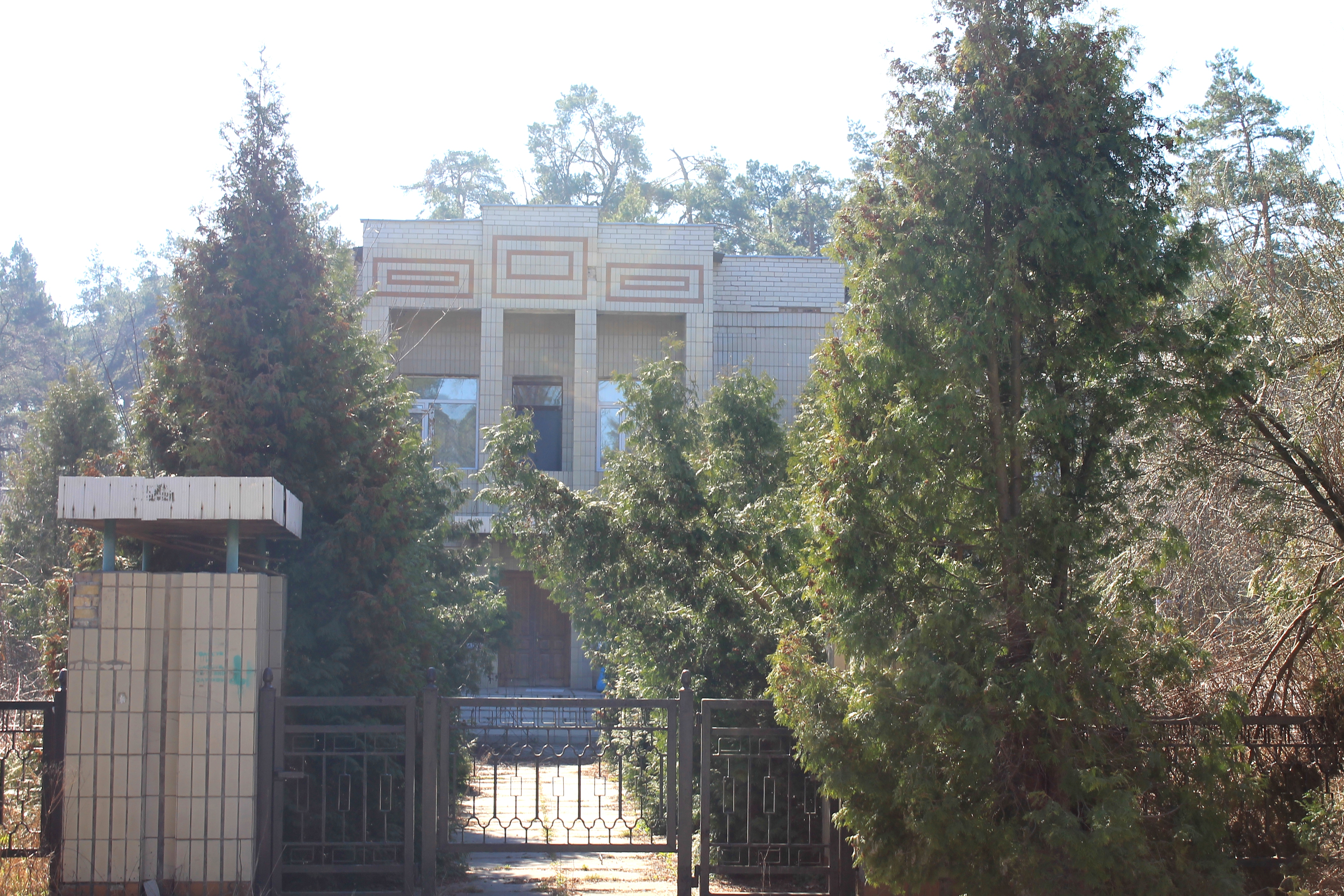

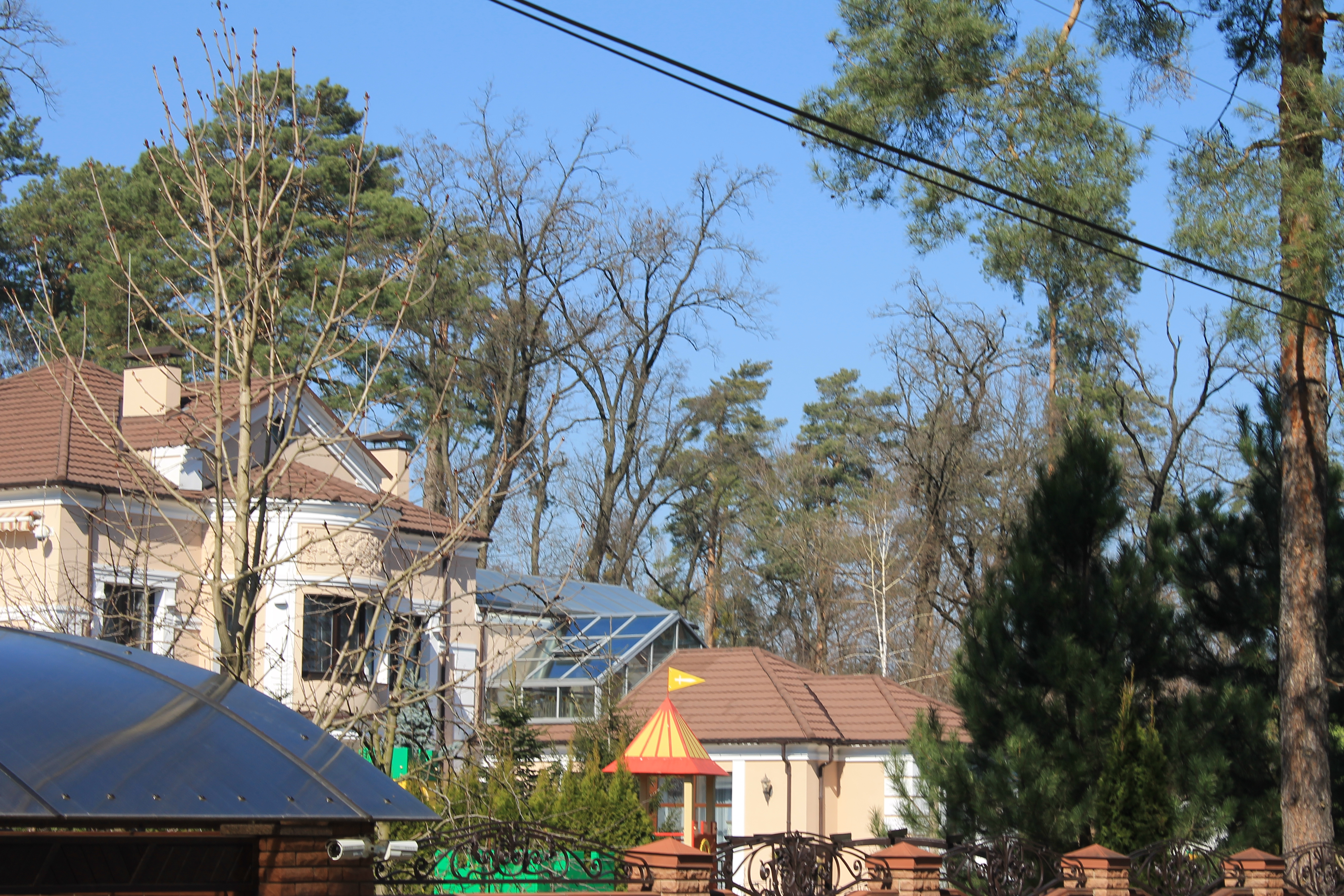

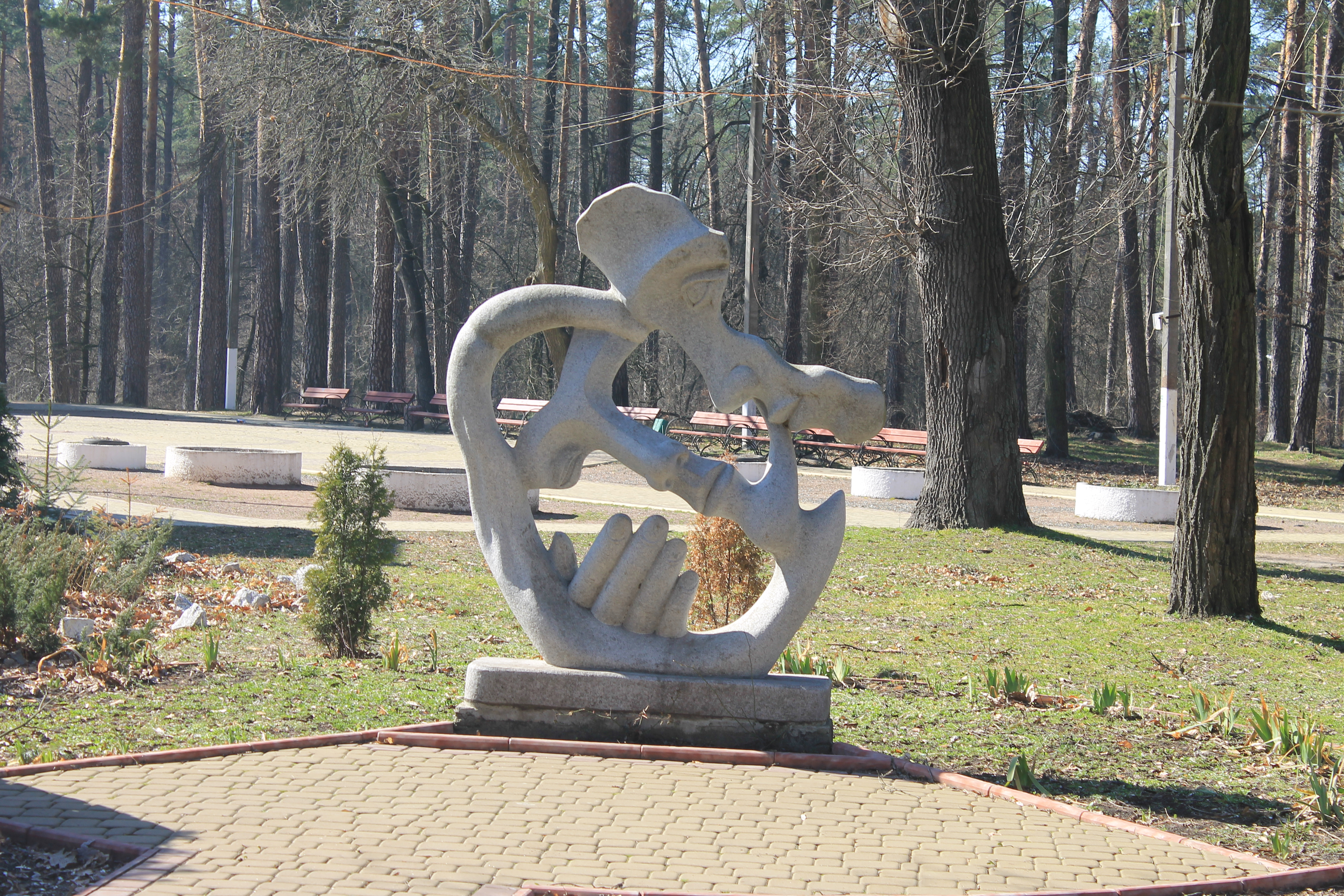

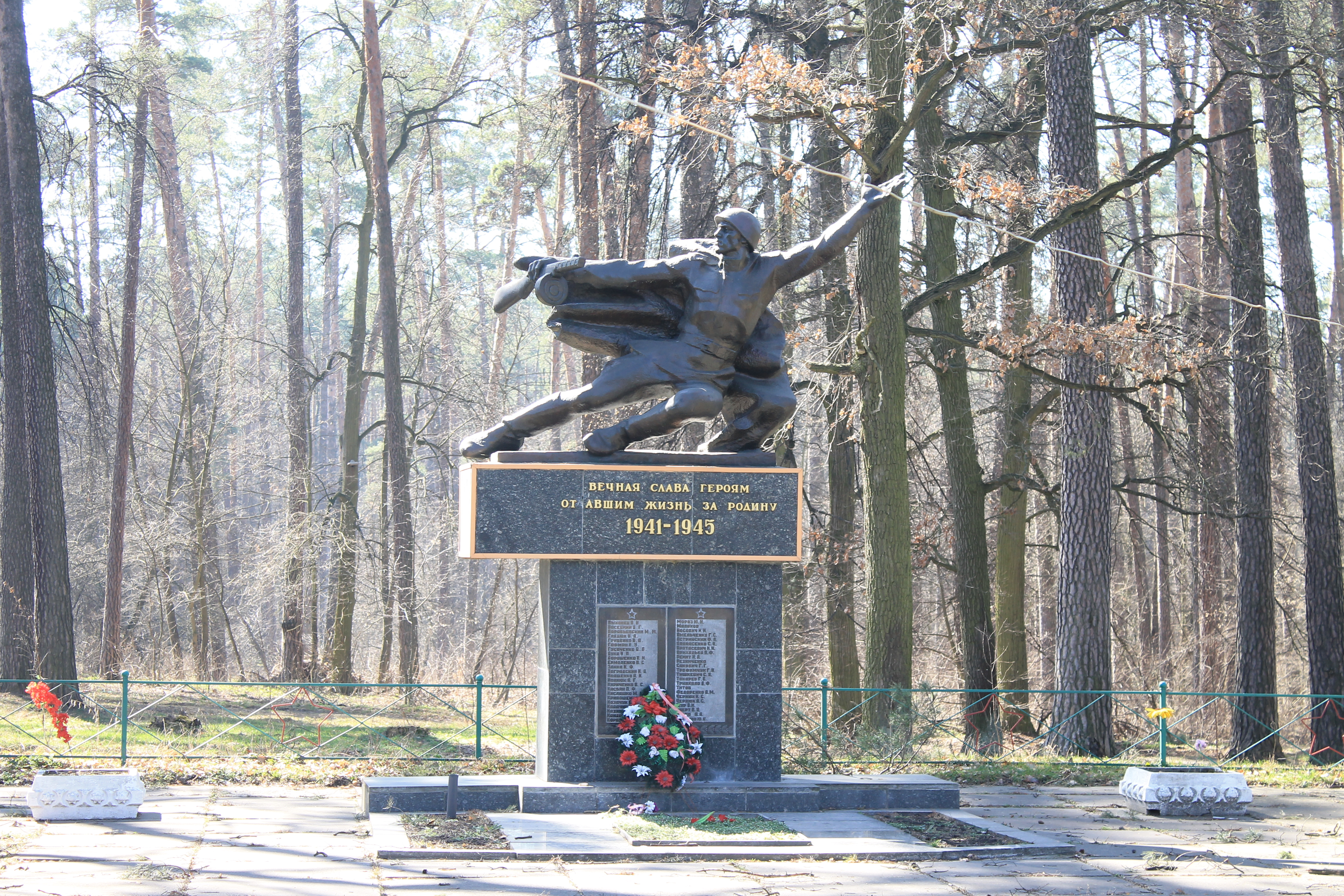

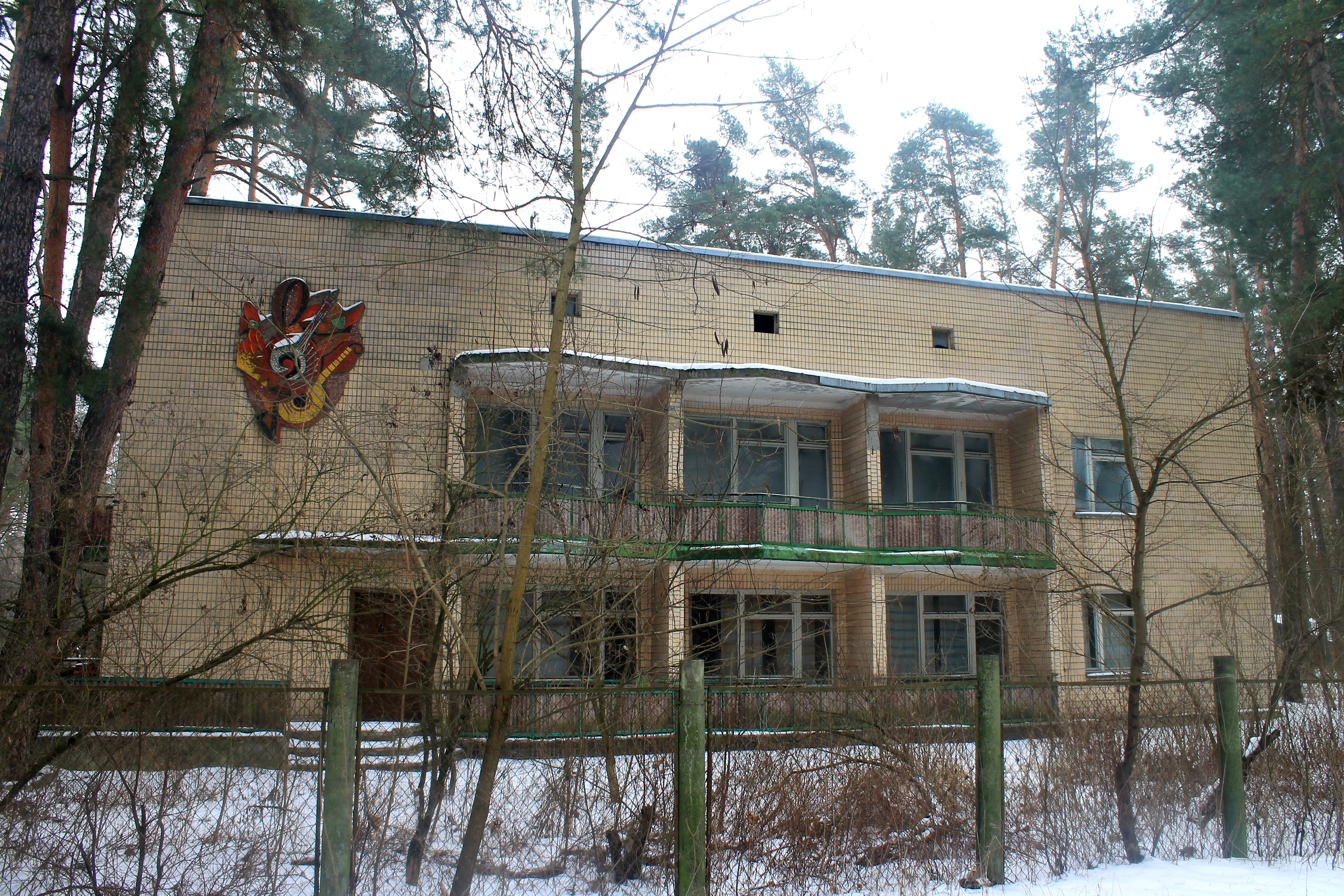

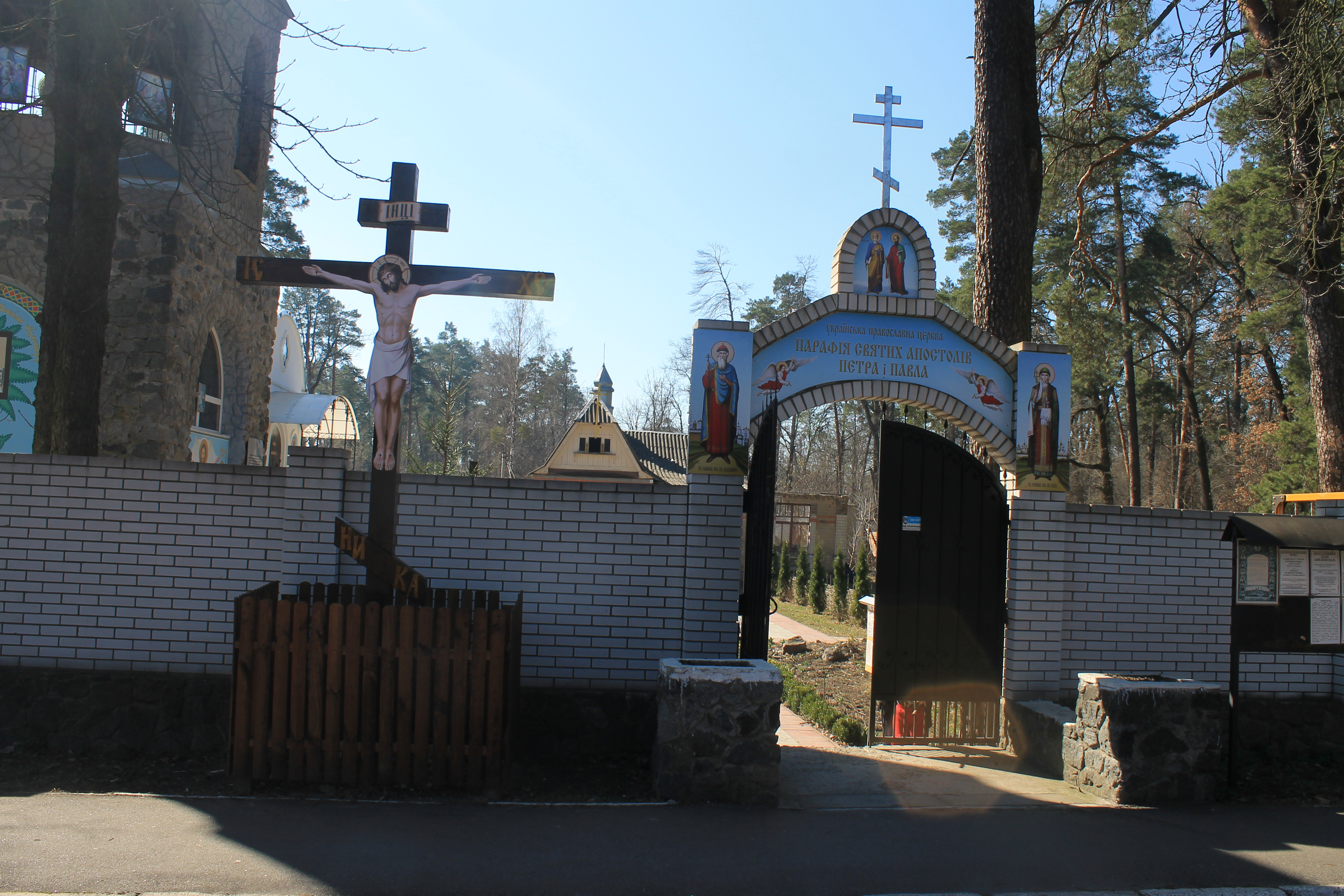
