= Lyutizh =

Rural locality in Kyiv Oblast, Ukraine

Lyutizh Лютіж
- Village-type settlement
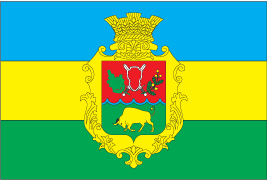
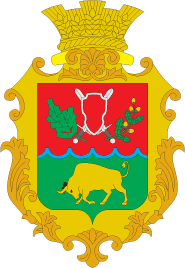
- Flag Coat of arms

- Location within Ukraine Location within Kyiv Oblast
- Coordinates: 50°41′05″N 30°23′40″E
- Country: Ukraine
- Oblast: Kyiv Oblast
- Raion: Vyshhorod Raion

Population (2006)
  - Total: 2,282
- Postal code: 07352
- Area code: +380 4596
- Website: https://rada.info/rada/04359593/

Lyutizh (Ukrainian: Лютіж; Russian: Лютеж - Lyutezh) is a village 30 km to the north of Kyiv in Vyshhorod Raion of Kyiv Oblast, Ukraine, with some 2280 inhabitants (2006). It belongs to Petrivtsi rural hromada, one of the hromadas of Ukraine.

The village, first mentioned in 975. In the 19th century Lyutizh was part of Staro-Petrovskaya volost, Kievsky Uyezd, Kiev Governorate.

The village is best known for the Lyutezh bridgehead, established by troops of the 1st Ukrainian Front on the right bank of the Dnieper in the autumn of 1943 during the Battle of the Dnieper. The fighting for the bridgehead is commemorated in the National Museum-Preserve "Battle for Kyiv 1943" in the nearby village of Novi Petrivtsi.
