= Ozera, Kyiv Oblast =

Ozera Озера
- Village
- Location within Kyiv Oblast Location within Ukraine
- Coordinates: 50°37′31.5″N 30°12′34.9″E
- Country: Ukraine
- Oblast: Kyiv Oblast
- Raion: Bucha Raion
- Hromada: Hostomel settlement hromada

Area
  - Land: 17 km^{2} (6.6 sq mi)

Population
  - Total: 819
- Postal code: 07834

Ozera (Ukrainian: Озера) is a village in Bucha Raion, Kyiv Oblast, Ukraine. It belongs to the Hostomel settlement hromada. The population is 819 people.

== Geography ==
Ozera is located approximately 40 km from Kyiv. It is located between Lubianka, Blystavytsia, and Hostomel.

== History ==
According to Lavrentii Pokhylevych, the village got its name due to the large number of lakes (ozera) that once were located in the area.

The village has existed from the times of Kievan Rus'. There was a church in the village, but it was ruined during the Mongol invasion. The church's bells were relocated to Mezhyhirria Monastery.

As of 1900, the village was a part of Hostomel volost of Kiev uezd, and consisted of 99 yards, and had a population of 533 (273 men and 260 women). The village had a school, a forge, a grocery store, and a fire station with four barrels, three hooks, and two ladders.

During the Russian invasion of Ukraine, the village was under occupation from February to the end of March.

== Transportation ==
There are marshrutkas that lead in and out of the village that connect it to Kyiv and neighboring settlements.

== Establishments ==
There is a narodnyi dim, where various gatherings and performances are held. A club also exists in the village.

There is a cemetery in Ozera, and a church is located close by.

== Notable people ==
Leonid Yefremovych Makhnovets (1919 – 1993), a historian, literary critic, archaeologist, and bibliographer.
