= Petrivtsi rural hromada =

Petrivtsi rural hromada Петрівська селищна громада
- Hromada
- Interactive map of Petrivtsi rural hromada
- Country: Ukraine
- Oblast: Kyiv
- Raion: Vyshhorod

Area
  - Total: 192.3 km^{2} (74.2 sq mi)

Population (2020)
  - Total: 12,001
  - Density: 62.41/km^{2} (161.6/sq mi)
- Settlements: 4
- Villages: 4

Petrivtsi rural hromada (Ukrainian: Петрівська селищна громада) is a hromada of Ukraine, located in Vyshhorod Raion, Kyiv Oblast. Its administrative center is the village of Novi Petrivtsi.

It has an area of 192.3 square kilometres (74.2 mi^{2}) and a population of 12,001, as of 2020.

The hromada contains 4 settlements, which are all villages:

- Novi Petrivtsi
- Huta-Mezhyhirska
- Liutizh
- Stari Petrivtsi

== See also ==
- List of hromadas of Ukraine
