= Nikolai Sergeyev (admiral) =

Chief navy officer of soviet

Nikolay Sergeyev Никола́й Дми́триевич Серге́ев
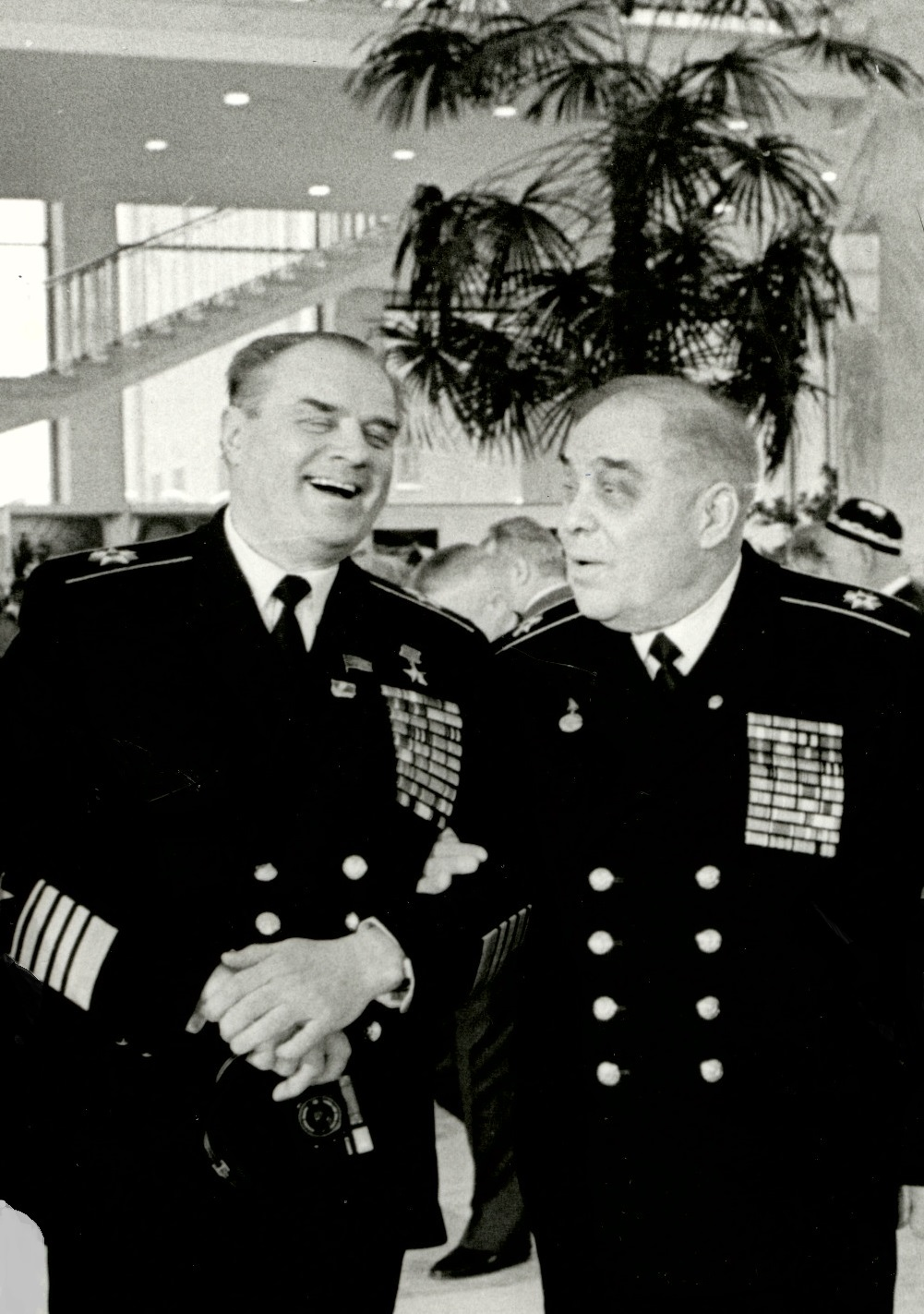
- Admirals of the fleet Smirnov (left) and Sergeyev (right)
- Born: October 5, 1909; Stari Petrivtsi, Kiev uezd, Kiev Governorate, Russian Empire
- Died: February 11, 1999 (aged 89) Moscow, Russia
- Allegiance: Soviet Union
- Branch: Soviet Navy, Russian Navy
- Service years: 1928–1992
- Rank: Fleet Admiral
- Commands: Chief of staff of the Soviet Navy
- Conflicts: World War II
- Awards: Order of Lenin (twice)

Nikolai Dmitriyevich Sergeyev (Ukrainian: Микола Дмитрович Серге́ев; Russian: Никола́й Дми́триевич Серге́ев, October 5, 1909 – February 11, 1999) was a Fleet Admiral and Chief of staff of the Soviet Navy.

== Biography ==
Sergeyev joined the Navy in 1928 and completed the M.V. Frunze Higher Naval School in 1931. In 1932 he joined the Amur Military Flotilla in the Far East and served on and commanded river monitors. He completed the Naval Academy in 1941.

During World War II Sergeyev first served on the Main Navy Staff planning amphibious operations and then commanded monitors with the Volga Flotilla before returning to the Main Navy Staff in 1943.

After the war Sergeyev continued to serve on the Main Navy Staff and took part in the Soviet nuclear testing programme near Novaya Zemlya. He became head of the Main Operations Directorate in 1953 and Chief of Naval Staff in 1964, serving for 13 years (longer than anyone else) in that post. He was promoted to Fleet Admiral in 1970 and was Inspector General in the Ministry of Defence.

Sergeyev retired in 1992 and died in Moscow in 1999. He is buried in the Novodevichy Cemetery.

== Honours and awards ==
- Order of Zhukov (Russia, 1995)
- Two Orders of Lenin (1959, 1967)
- Order of the October Revolution (1978)
- Three Orders of the Red Banner (1943, 1949, 1958)
- Order of Nakhimov, 2nd class (1945)
- Two Orders of the Patriotic War, 1st class (1944, 1985)
- Order of the Red Banner of Labour (1969)
- Three Orders of the Red Star (1943, 1944, 1963)
- Order "For Service to the Homeland in the Armed Forces of the USSR", 3rd class (1989)
- USSR State Prize (1974)
- Jubilee Medal "In Commemoration of the 100th Anniversary of the Birth of Vladimir Ilyich Lenin"
