= Moshchun =

Village in Kyiv Oblast, Ukraine

Moshchun Мощун
- Village
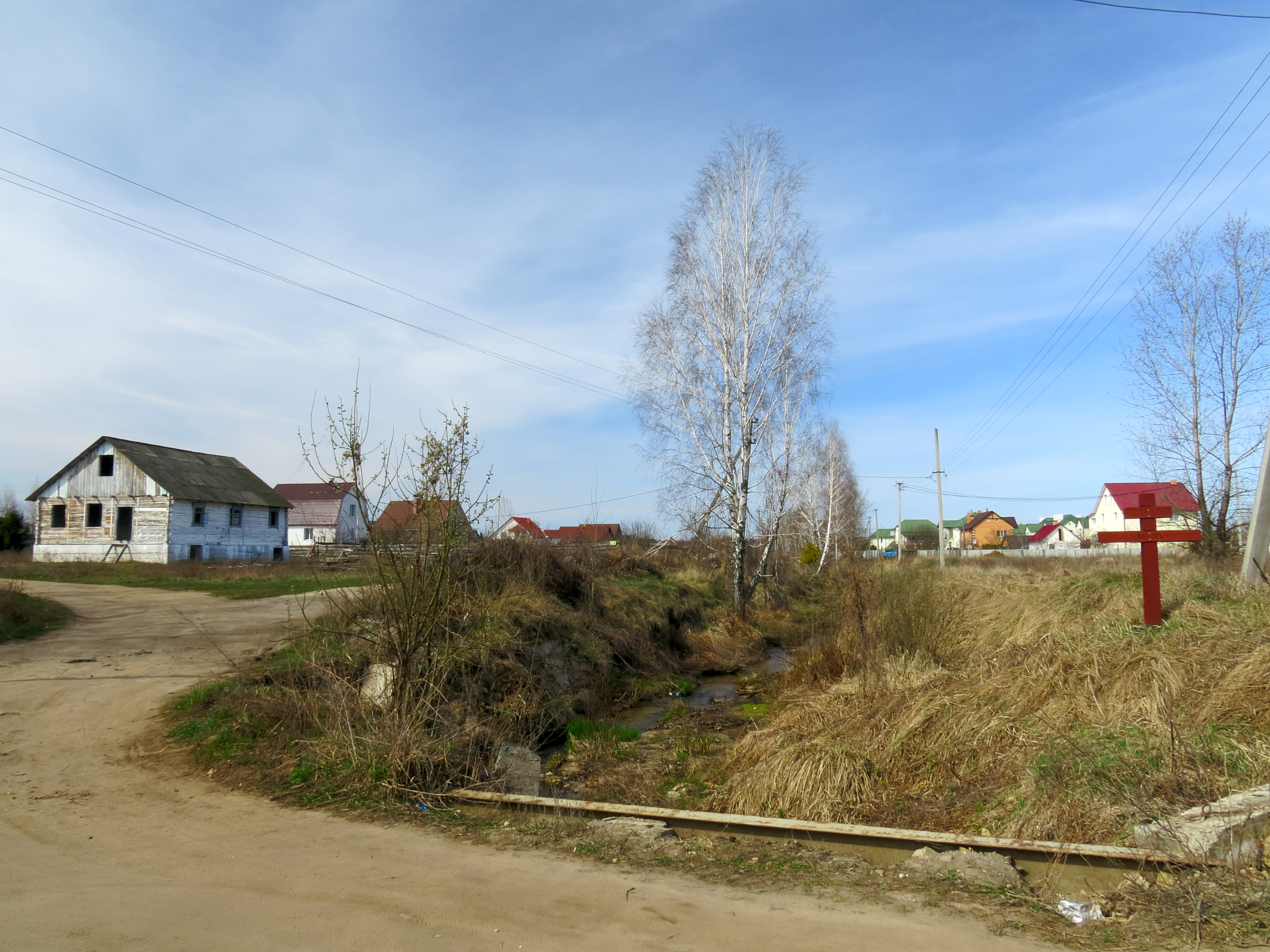

- Location of Moshchun within Kyiv Oblast Moshchun (Ukraine)
- Coordinates: 50.603°N 30.313°E
- Country: Ukraine
- Oblast: Kyiv Oblast
- Raion: Bucha Raion
- Hromada: Hostomel settlement hromada
- Founded: 1664

Population
  - Total: 794
- Time zone: UTC+2
  - Summer (DST): UTC+3 (EEST)
- Postal code: 08106
- Area code: +380 4598

Moshchun or Moschun (Ukrainian: Мощун) is a village in Bucha Raion, Kyiv Oblast, Ukraine. It belongs to the Hostomel settlement hromada, one of the hromadas of Ukraine. Most of the village was destroyed during Russia's attempt to capture Kyiv as part of its 2022 invasion.

== History ==
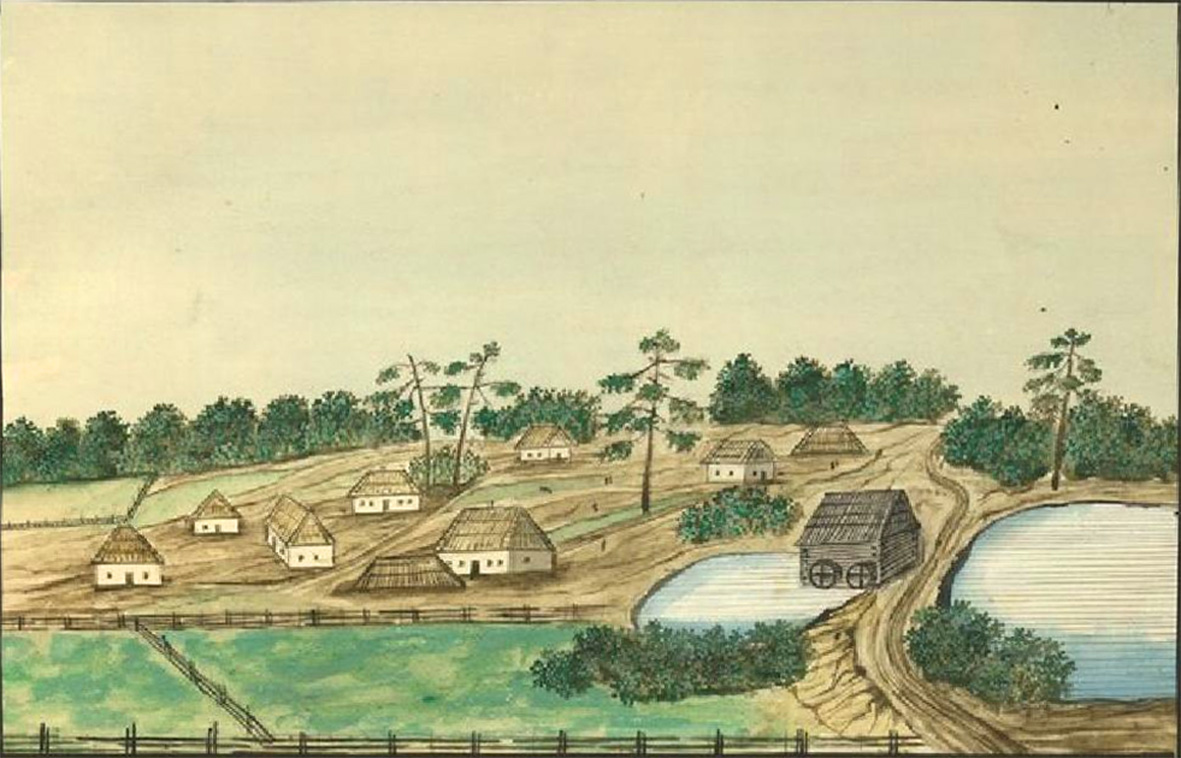
1854 drawing of Moshchun

Moshchun was originally named Pylnia (Ukrainian: Пильня) after the many sawmills in the village.

The May 21, 1656 Universal of Hetman Bohdan Khmelnytsky gifted Moshchun, Vyshhorod, and Novi Petrivtsi to the Mezhyhirya Monastery.

In 1886, Moshchun had a population of 203.

The Russian language television programs Muhtar's Return & Svaty were both filmed in Moshchun.

During the 2022 Russian invasion of Ukraine, the village was the site of the important Battle of Moshchun. Ukrainian forces held their positions at Moshchun against many Russian attacks, and it became one of the key strongholds protecting Kyiv. 70% of buildings in the village were destroyed during the battle.

== Gallery ==
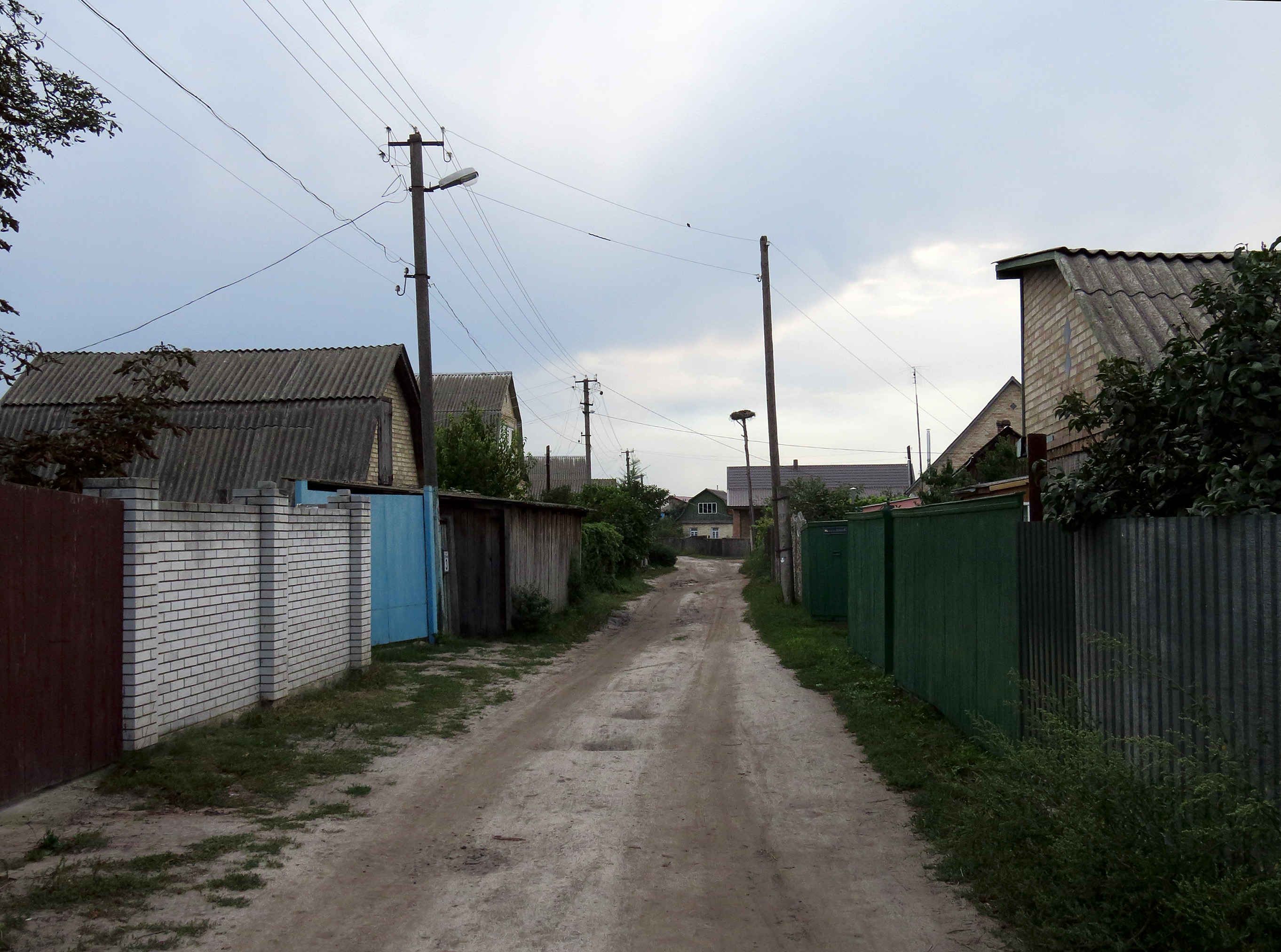
Vyshnevyi (Cherry) Lane

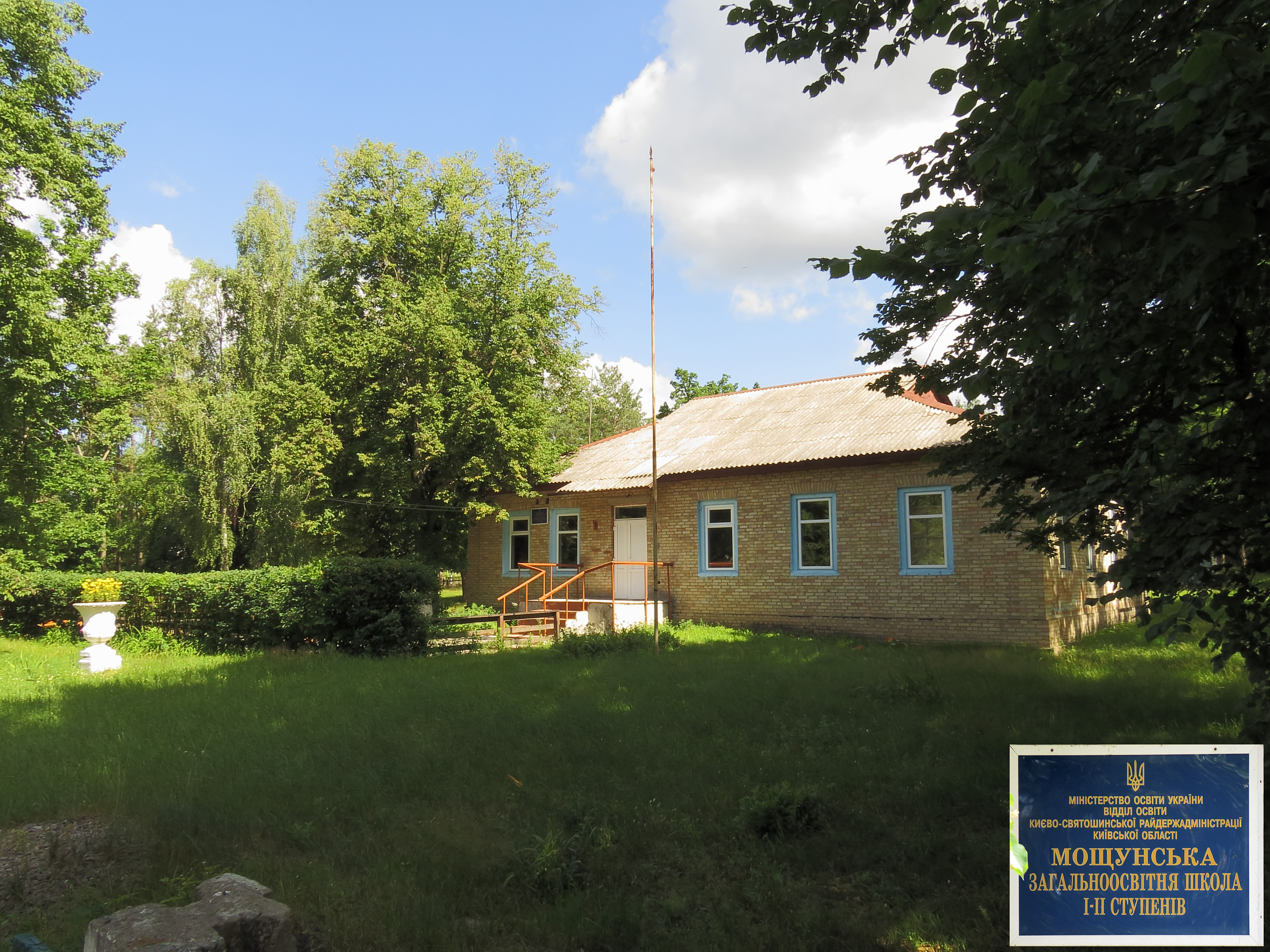
A school

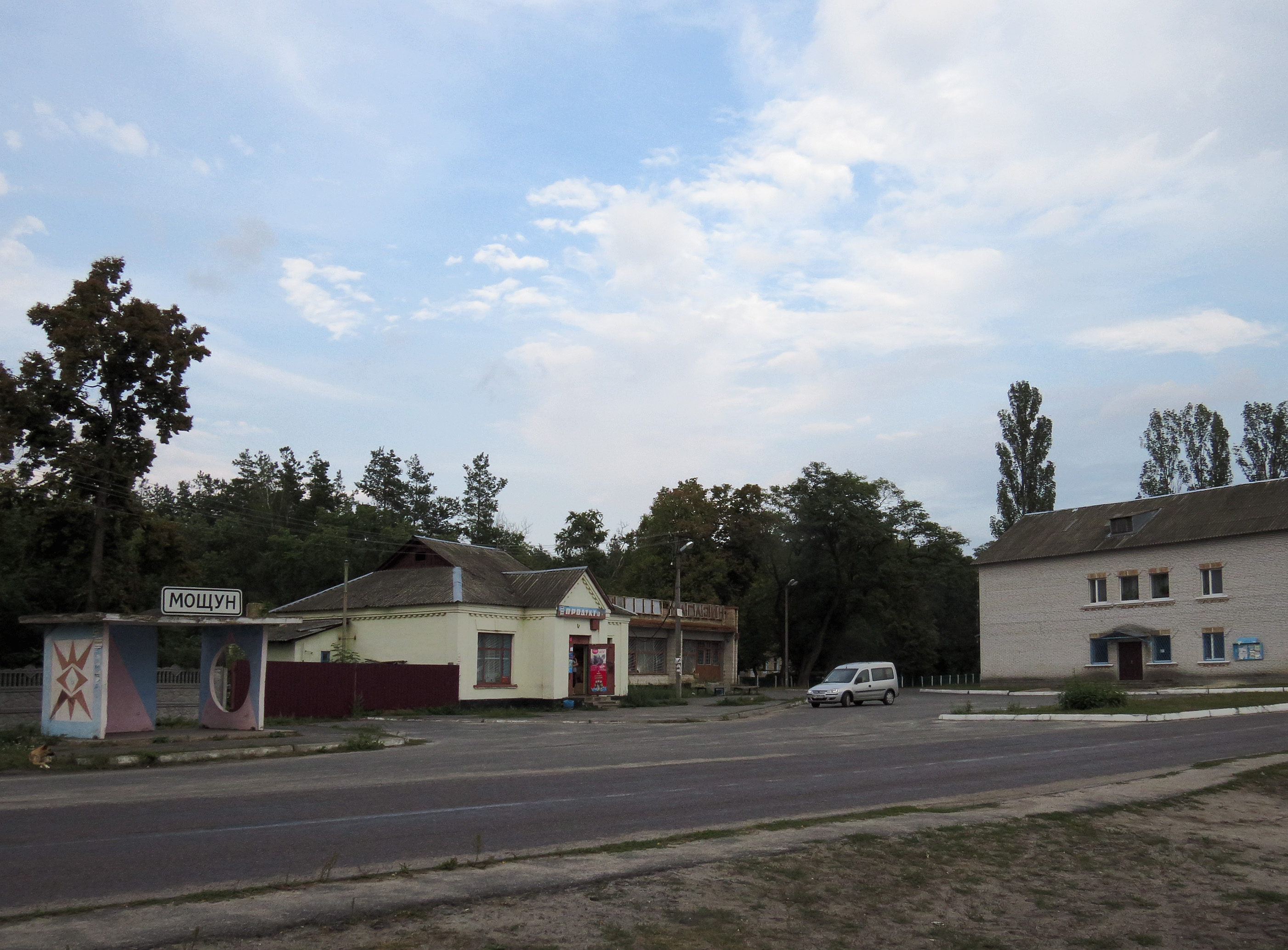
A bus stop and shops

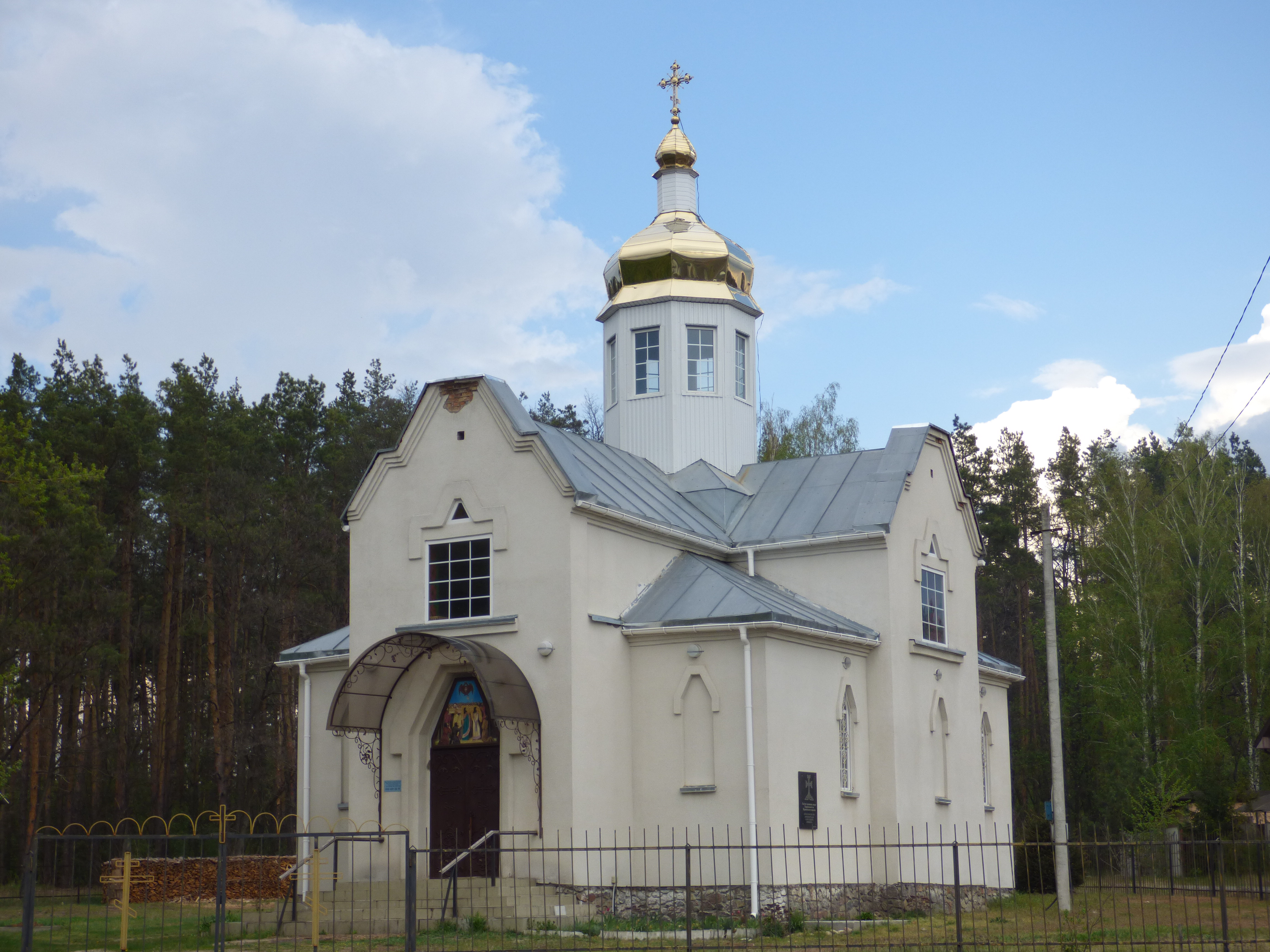
The Church of St. John the Divine
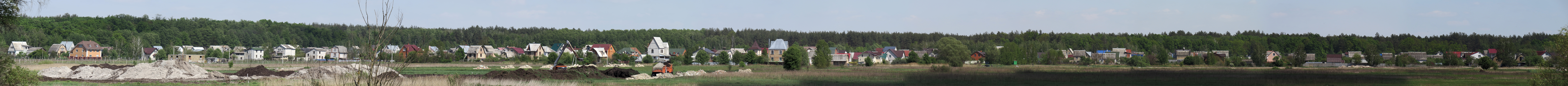
A panorama of Moshchun from the Irpin River as of 2014
