= Nikolai Sergeyev =

Nikolai Sergeyev may refer to:

- Nikolay Sergeyev (1855–1919), Russian painter
- Nicholas Sergeyev (1876–1951), Russian choreographer and ballet master
- Nikolai Sergeyev (actor) (1894–1988), Russian actor
- Nikolai Sergeyev (painter) (1908–1989), Russian painter
- Nikolai Sergeyev (admiral) (1909–1999), Admiral of the Fleet of the Soviet Navy
