= Battle of Moshchun =

Battle during the Russian invasion of Ukraine

- Part of the northern front of the Russian invasion of Ukraine
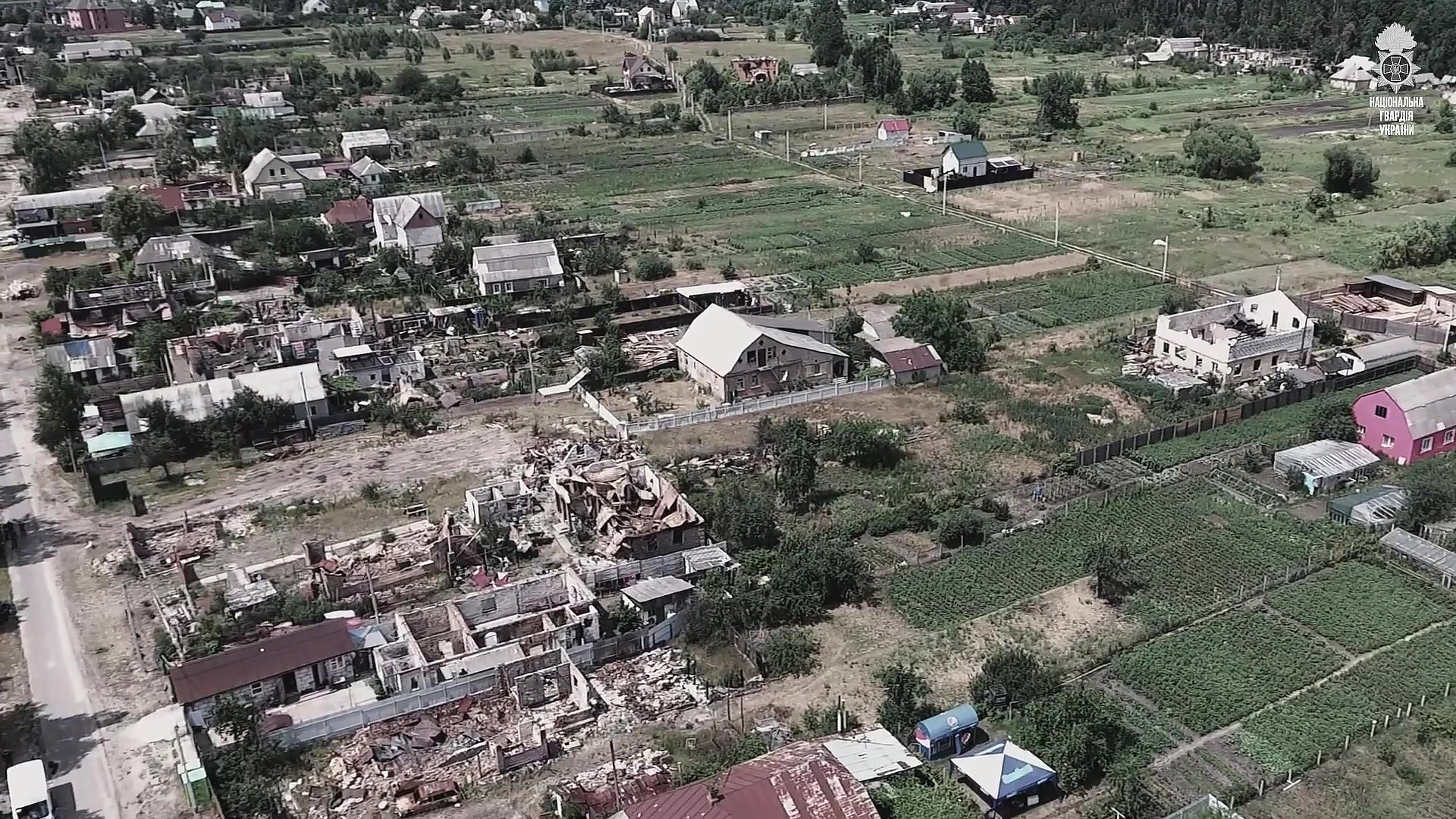
- An aerial photograph of Moshchun after the battle
Date	5–21 March 2022 (2 weeks and 2 days)
Location	Moshchun, Bucha Raion, Kyiv Oblast, Ukraine 50°36′13″N 30°18′48″E
Result	Ukrainian victory

Belligerents
Russia	Ukraine

Commanders and leaders
Sergey Chubarykin	Oleksandr Syrskyi; Oleksandr Vdovychenko; Roman Kovalenko

Units involved
76th Guards Air Assault Division; 155th Separate Marine Brigade	72nd Mechanized Brigade

Strength
30,000 troops (including Irpin)	3,000 troops (including Irpin)

Casualties and losses
Per Ukraine: 100 confirmed killed	Per Ukraine: 118 killed

The battle of Moshchun was a series of military engagements for control of the village of Moshchun and its surroundings during the initial phase of the Russian invasion of Ukraine. The battle lasted from 5 March to 21 March 2022, and has been described as "one of the fiercest and most important battles during the defense of Kyiv."

== Background ==
After Russian Ground Forces took control of Hostomel airport on 25 February 2022, the main group of Russian forces launched a massive offensive on Kyiv from Belarus through the Chernobyl exclusion zone. In the course of a rapid advance, Russian troops took control of Chernobyl, Ivankiv, Dymer, and Borodyanka. They also reached the outskirts of Bucha.

In order to deter the Russian advance, Ukrainian troops blew up the bridges crossing the Irpin River as they retreated. Shelling and fighting continued along the river for several days. Ukrainian reinforcements were sent to fortify Moshchun; Oleksandr Syrskyi, the Ukrainian commander overseeing the defense of Kyiv, took particular interest in the town as it could serve as a gateway into the capital and would oversee the defense of the location.

== Battle ==
Russian forces first crossed the bridge over the Irpin River at Moshchun late in the morning of 27 February, where they were engaged by mechanized units of Ukraine's 72nd Brigade's 5th Company and territorial defense forces, forcing the Russian vehicles to retreat.

Moshchun was subjected to regular mortar, artillery, and air bombardment from 28 February, and the 5th Company, responsible for the defense of the village, urged all remaining civilians to evacuate on 5 March.

On March 5, a small number of Russian special forces entered and occupied the northwestern part of Moshchun. The Russian troops included the 76th Guards Air Assault Division under Sergey Chubarykin.

On the morning of March 6, a significant number Russian troops began to cross the river. At that time, the defense of Moshchun was held by a company of the 72nd Mechanized Brigade. The brigade was headed by Colonel Oleksandr Vdovychenko, while the main defending company was led by Capt. Roman Kovalenko. Under pressure, Ukrainian forces retreated to the center of the village and regrouped. Later on, Ukrainian special forces armed with anti-tank weapons arrived as reinforcements. The Russians continuously attacked the village with "Grads", artillery fire, mortar shelling, airstrikes, drones, and attack helicopters. Russian forces also disabled Ukrainian drones and jammed communications in the area using electronic warfare tactics.

By mid-March, Russian forces still faced fierce resistance from Ukrainian defenders in the neighboring city of Irpin, as well as other areas west of the capital. Having failed to break through Ukrainian defenses in these areas, the Russian army chose to prioritize advancing on Kyiv through Moshchun.

At the beginning of the war, part of the Kozarovichi dam was blown up to allow water from the Kyiv reservoir to enter the Irpin River in an effort to raise its level and create a natural barrier. The river exceeded its banks by 1.5–2 meters, making crossings difficult. The flooding made it almost impossible for Russian troops stationed at Hostomel Airport to reach Moshchun, which they considered as a gateway to Kyiv.

On March 11, Russian troops launched a massive assault on Moshchun from all sides. Ukrainian troops brought reinforcements into the village in an attempt to repel the offensive. Under the influence of heavy artillery fire, Ukrainian forces gradually retreated to the outskirts of the village over the following days. In the aftermath, Ukrainian troops set up defensive positions in the forest near Moshchun. Around March 14, Vdovychenko offered to the Commander-in-Chief of the Armed Forces of Ukraine, Valerii Zaluzhnyi to retreat from Moshchun. The General replied by saying "If you move away, then Kyiv" and "We will look for forces and means". The command decided to continue the defense of the village and change its tactics. Vdovychenko began to rotate troops every three days, saying "Due to the density of shelling and the cold, it was impossible [for them] to stay longer." He also introduced a new battalion into the battle.

A few days later, Ukrainian units surrounded Moshchun on two sides, and began to heavily shell the Russian troop concentrations and river crossings in the village. The Ukrainian army then pushed Russian troops back to the Irpin River.

On March 21, the Armed Forces of Ukraine completely liberated the village of Moshchun from Russian occupation.

== Military value ==
Moshchun became an important defense outpost of Kyiv. Russian forces saw the village of Moshchun as a strategic position they needed to control to capture Kyiv. To this end, the Russian army sent many qualified troops, jet artillery, mortars, and aircraft to capture the village. Despite the difficult situation, the Ukrainian army stopped the Russian offensive, and later managed to push Russian troops to the left bank of the Irpin River.

== Aftermath ==
Russian losses at Moshchun, Irpin, Makariv, and other nearby settlements contributed to their decision to completely withdraw from Kyiv Oblast.

During the battle, about 2,000 of the 2,800 buildings in Moshchun were destroyed.

The following year, the Ukrainians claimed to have identified 100 Russian soldiers killed during the battle, including 45 paratroopers from Russia's 331st Guards Airborne Regiment and 30 soldiers from the 155th Separate Marine Brigade. 118 Ukrainian soldiers were also confirmed to have been killed during the battle.

In 2023, the memorial "Angels of Victory" was created in Moshchun to commemorate the fallen soldiers. On 6 September 2024, the battlefield was recorded by Ukraine as being a monument of national historical significance.
