= Order of Kutuzov =

Military decoration of the USSR

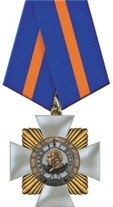
- Order of Kutuzov (obverse)
- Type: Single grade order
- Awarded for: Outstanding military leadership
- Presented by: Russian Federation; USSR
- Eligibility: Senior military officers
- Status: Active
- Established: July 29, 1942
- Ribbon of the Order of Kutuzov, First class

Precedence
- Next (higher): Order of Zhukov
- Next (lower): Order of Nakhimov

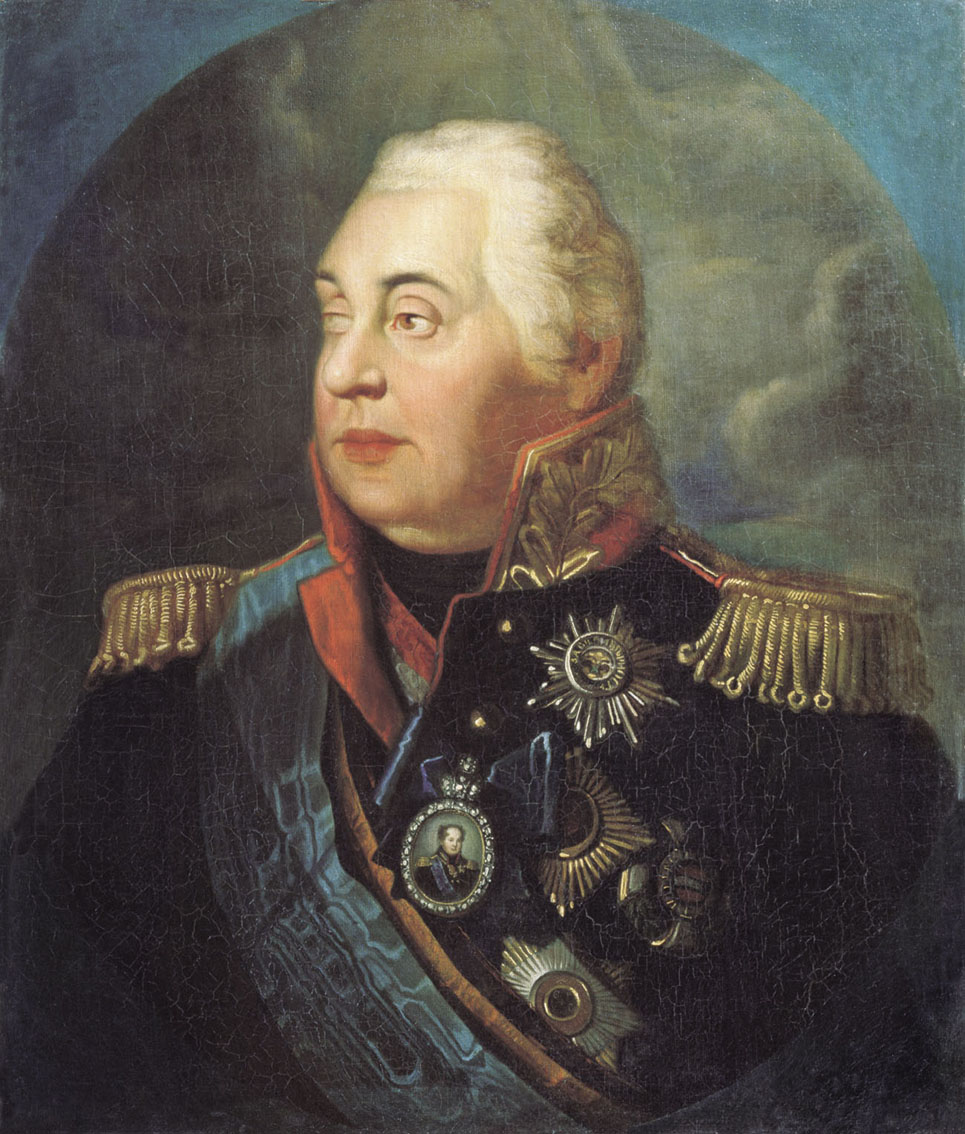
Field Marshal Mikhail Kutuzov

The Order of Kutuzov (Russian: орден Кутузова orden Kutuzova) is a military decoration of the Russian Federation named after famous Russian Field Marshal Mikhail Illarionovich Kutuzov (1745–1813). The Order was established during World War II to reward senior Red Army officers. The Order of Kutuzov has three classes and was retained by the Russian Federation after the Dissolution of the Soviet Union.

== History ==
The order was established during the German-Soviet War by decree of the Presidium of the Supreme Soviet of the USSR of July 29, 1942, it was created to reward senior officers of the Red Army for skillful avoidance of enemy attacks and successful counter-attacks.

The Order of Kutuzov was established in three classes: 1st class, 2nd class, and 3rd class. General Ivan Galanin who distinguished himself during the Battle of Stalingrad became the first recipient of the Order 1st class. During World War II, 669 Orders of Kutuzov 1st class were awarded. The Order of Kutuzov 1st class was also awarded to Chelyabinsk Tractor Plant in 1945, to recognize the enormous contribution of its workers towards the defeat of Nazi Germany.

The Order 2nd class was awarded to 3,325 corps, division, and brigade commanders. The Order 3rd class was awarded to regimental commanders, their chiefs of staff, battalion and company commanders and was only established on February 8, 1943. 3,328 3rd class orders were awarded.

Following the 1991 dissolution of the USSR, the Order of Kutuzov was retained unchanged in both design and statute by decree of the Supreme Soviet of the Russian Federation No 2424-1 of March 2, 1992. The present Order was modified to its current design and award criteria by Presidential Decree 1099 of September 7, 2010.

== Award statute ==
The Order of Kutuzov is awarded to commanders of military units and their deputies, as well as to commanders of battalions and companies: for skilful organization and conduct of operations during which, despite the numerical superiority of the enemy, the objectives of the operation were met; for tenacity in repelling enemy attacks from the air, land or sea, for retaining the combat readiness in designated areas of responsibility, for the creation of conditions for conducting subsequent operations with offensive purposes; for skilful organization and control of troops (forces), establishment of prepared defences, maintaining close interaction between the troops (forces) involved in the operations, ensuring the defeat of the enemy or depth of damage inflicted depriving him the opportunity to continue his offensive; for skilful conduct of combat on land and/or in the air, surrounded by superior enemy forces, for the organization of a breakthrough with the withdrawal of troops from the area without significant loss of combat effectiveness; for the capture, with minor losses, of a major site of resistance, its communications, the defeat of his rear garrisons and bases, the capture and retaining of vital areas, repelling strong counterattacks by air, land and/or sea; for successful execution of combat missions, displaying personal courage leading to the destruction of critical enemy military facilities and equipment on land, air and sea.

It can also be awarded to military units that participated in operation, during which, despite the stubborn resistance of the enemy, the objectives were met with full operational capability of military units retained. May also be awarded to foreign citizens - soldiers of allied forces from among the officers who took part along with soldiers of the Russian Federation in organizing and conducting a successful operation of allied troops (forces).

The Order of Kutuzov is worn on the left side of the chest and when in the presence of other Orders and medal of the Russian Federation, is located immediately after the Order of Zhukov.

== Award description ==
The badge of the Order of Kutuzov is a 40mm wide silver cross pattée with gold rays protruding between its arms at an obtuse angle. In the center of the obverse, a silver medallion bordered by a wide white enamelled band surrounded by a gilt laurel and oak wreath. In the medallion, the gold plated left profile bust of M.I. Kutuzov with the image of the Kremlin wall in the background. On the sides of the medallion's white enamelled band, the gilt inscription "Mikhail Kutuzov" (Russian: «Михаил Кутузов»). The reverse is plain, the award serial number is inscribed on the reverse of the cross lower arm.

The Order of Kutuzov is suspended from a standard Russian pentagonal mount by a ring through the suspension loop. The mount is covered by an overlapping dark blue silk moiré ribbon with a central 5mm wide orange stripe.

First Class	Second Class	Third Class
Ribbons (1943–2010)

== See also ==
- Awards and decorations of the Russian Federation
- Awards and decorations of the Soviet Union
