= Mezhyhirya Monastery =

Ruined monastery in Ukraine

Mezhyhirya Savior-Transfiguration Monastery
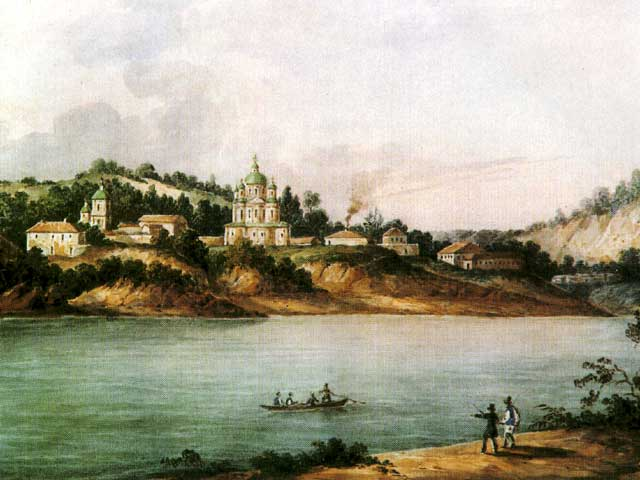
- The Mezhyhirya Monastery, located on the right bank of the Dnieper. Fyodor Solntsev, 1843.
- Interactive map of Mezhyhirya Savior-Transfiguration Monastery

Monastery information
- Other name: Mezhyhiria Monastery
- Denomination: Orthodox church
- Established: unknown
- Disestablished: 1935
- Controlled churches: Gate Church of Saints Peter and Paul, Transfiguration Cathedral

People
- Founder: unknown

Site
- Location: Novi Petrivtsi, Vyshhorod Raion, Kyiv Oblast
- Coordinates: 50°37′7″N 30°27′55″E
- Visible remains: Water well
- Public access: Restricted

Immovable Monument of Local Significance of Ukraine
- Official name: Садиба колишнього Межигірського Спасо-Преображенського монастиря (Site of the former Mezhyhiria Saviour-Transfiguration Monastery)
- Type: Archaeology, History
- Reference no.: 5994-Ко

The Mezhyhirya Savior-Transfiguration Monastery (Note: The monastery's inhabitants referred to the monastery as the "Place of the Mezhyhirya Saviour" (Russian: Обитель «Межигорского спаса»). See: "Malorossiya, Podoliya, and Volyn". Kiev, its sacred places and attractions. 5th volume (in Russian). Nostalgiya. Archived from the original on 2009-06-30.) (Ukrainian: Межигірський Спасо-Преображенський монастир, romanized: Mezhyhirskyi Spaso-Preobrazhenskyi Monastyr) was an Eastern Orthodox female monastery that was located in the neighborhood of Mezhyhiria outside of the Vyshhorod city limits.

The monastery was located just 10 kilometres (6.2 mi) to the north of Vyshhorod. Today, the territory is part of the Vyshhorod Raion, Kyiv Oblast (province) in northern Ukraine. The location is situated in the Mezhyhirya ravine, on the right bank of the Dnieper River in close proximity to the Kyiv Reservoir.

It is unknown when the monastery was founded, although several different legends and stories about its founding exist. At the time of its height, the Mezhyhirya Monastery was considered a spiritual center of the Kievan Rus' royal Rurikid house, and later the Cossack Hetmanate. As an important monastery of the Zaporozhian Host, the Mezhyhirya Monastery left a rich legacy behind it.

The monastery was mentioned in one of Taras Shevchenko's poems, "Chernets," written in 1847, and was the subject of a drawing by him. Nikolai Gogol's novel, "Taras Bulba," published in 1835, also mentions the monastery. Throughout its existence, it was destroyed, and then restored numerous times, until it was demolished by Soviet authorities in 1935. Currently, the area of the former monastery is located on a fenced-in woodland territory next to Novi Petrivtsi village and is now a museum.

== History ==
=== Foundation and early history ===
Although it is unknown when the monastery was founded, there are several different legends and stories about its founding. Some Rus' chronicles mention that there was a nun in Mezhyhirya in the 12th century, which might indicate that the Mezhyhirya Monastery existed at the time, although this is uncertain. A 19th-century Orthodox Metropolitan of Kiev and Galicia, Yevgeniy Bolkhovitinov, claimed that it had been founded by the first Metropolitan of Kiev, Michael, along with Greek monks arriving from Byzantium in 988 AD. The claim is likely spurious, since Mezhyhirya is not listed by modern authors among the monasteries of Kievan Rus'.

In 1154, the Prince of Suzdal Yuri Dolgorukiy divided the territory surrounding the monastery's grounds amongst his sons. His son Andrey Bogolyubsky received the lands nearest to the monastery, now the city of Vyshhorod. Not too long afterwards, he is alleged to have moved the monastery to its current location in the hills of the Dnieper, giving the monastery its name, "Mezhyhirya." (Note: In this sense, "Mizh" (or "Mezh") translates as "between", while "hora" (or "hir") is equivalent to "hills" as in "between-the-hills".)

In 1482, the Mezhyhirya Monastery was attacked by the Crimean Tatars under Meñli I Giray. In 1520, the monastery was restored. In 1523, the monastery was transferred to the King of Poland and Grand Duke of Lithuania Sigismund I. In addition, the monastery was given a full reign over its territory. In 1555, the complex consisted of four churches, including one cave church on Pekarnitsky Hill.

=== Cossack monastery ===
During the 16th century, the monastery frequently lost and regained its ownership rights. On the funds of the monastery's new hegumen Afanasiy (a protégé of prince Konstanty Wasyl Ostrogski), the monastery's old buildings were demolished, and new ones were built in their place. In 1604, the Gate Church of Ss. Peter and Paul was constructed, in 1609 - the Mykilska Refectory, and the Transfiguration Cathedral in 1609-1611. Under his rule, the monastery was considered as the second lavra (cave monastery) in Ukraine. (Note: It was referred to as the "Sviato-Mezhyhirska Lavra" (Ukrainian: Свято-Межигірська Лавра).)

After its reconstruction, the Mezhyhirya Monastery became a regional center of the Zaporozhian Host, serving the host as a military monastery. In 1610, the monastery received the status of a stauropegic monastery (orthodox church autonomy), under the Patriarch of Constantinople. The universal (act) of Hetman Bohdan Khmelnytsky issued on May 21, 1656 transferred the neighboring settlements of Vyshhorod, Novi Petrivtsi, and Moshchun under control of the Mezhyhirya Monastery. In effect, the universal made Khmelnytsky the monastery's ktitor. (Note: A "ktitor" is someone who provides funds for the construction and decoration of a monastery.) After the destruction of the Trakhtemyrivskyi Monastery by a Polish szlachta army, the Mezhyhirya Monastery replaced it as the main cossack military monastery. As a military monastery, retired and elderly cossacks from the Zaporozhian Host would now come to the monastery to retire and live in until the end of their lives.

In 1676, the area was burned down after a fire started in the wooden Transfiguration Cathedral. With the help of Ivan Savelov, a monk who lived in the monastery and later became a Patriarch of Moscow, the complex was reconstructed. Two years later, with the help of the cossack community, the Annunciation Church was constructed near the monastery's hospital.

In 1683, the Sich Rada voted that the ministers in the Sich's Pokrovskyi Cathedral (the main cathedral of the sich) should be only from the Mezhyhirya Monastery. In 1691, monasteries located near the Sich were placed under the Mezhyhirya Monastery's authority. Under hegumen Feodosiy at the end of the 17th century, considered as a period of prosperity, the Mezhyhirya Monastery became one of the largest monastery's in Ukraine. The Mezhyhirya Chronicle, covering the period of 1608 to 1700, was completed around the turn of the century.

At the request of Peter I of Russia, the stauropegic status of the monastery was revoked; it was later reinstated in 1710. In 1717, a large fire destroyed a large portion of the monastery's buildings. The monastery's "military" status was reconfirmed by cossacks in 1735. In 1774, with the funds of the last Koshovyi Otaman Petro Kalnyshevsky, the Ss. Peter and Paul Church was reconstructed. Ukrainian architect Ivan Hryhorovych-Barskyi designed some of the buildings, including the monk's residence.

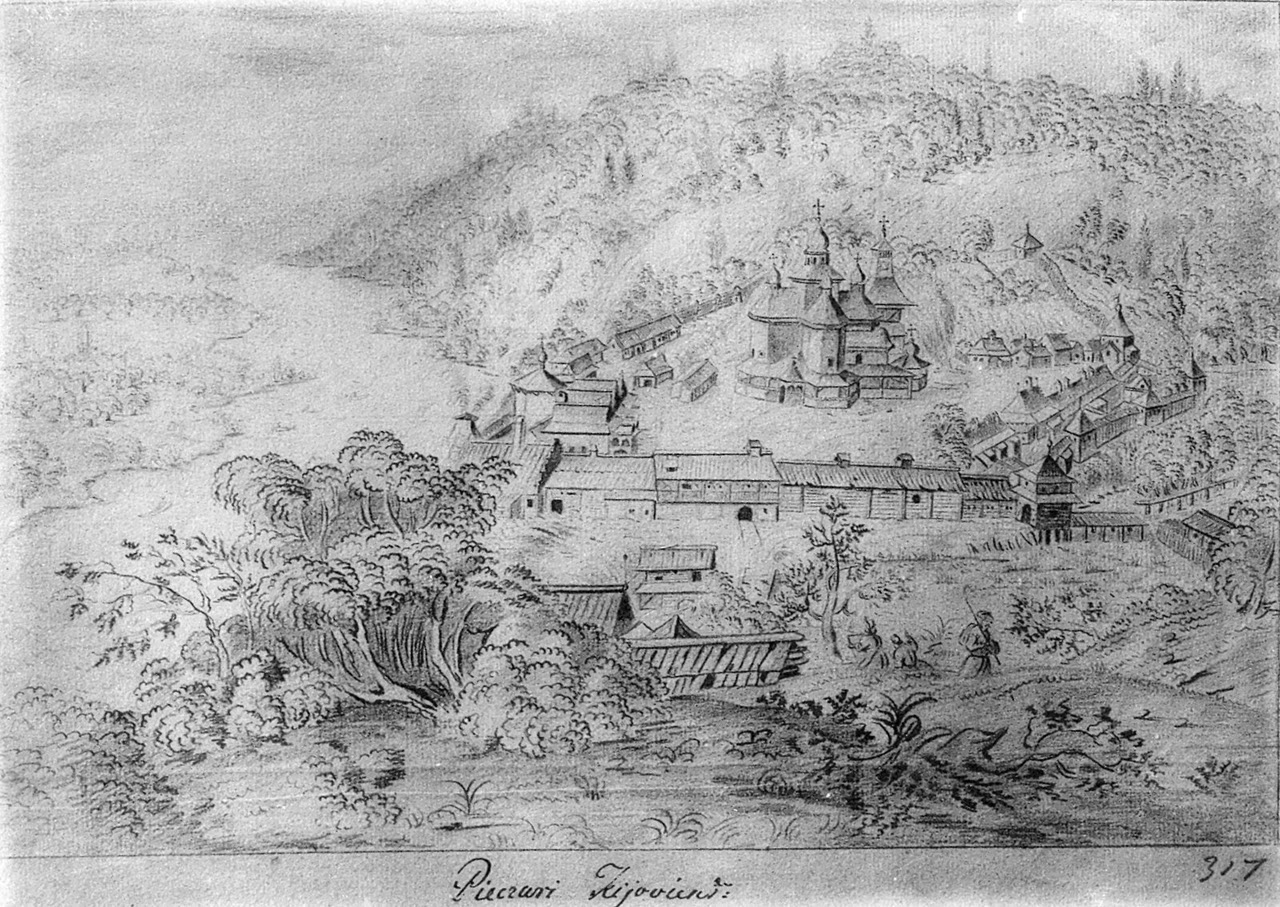
The Mezhyhirya Monastery as drawn by Abraham van Westerveld during the 1650s.

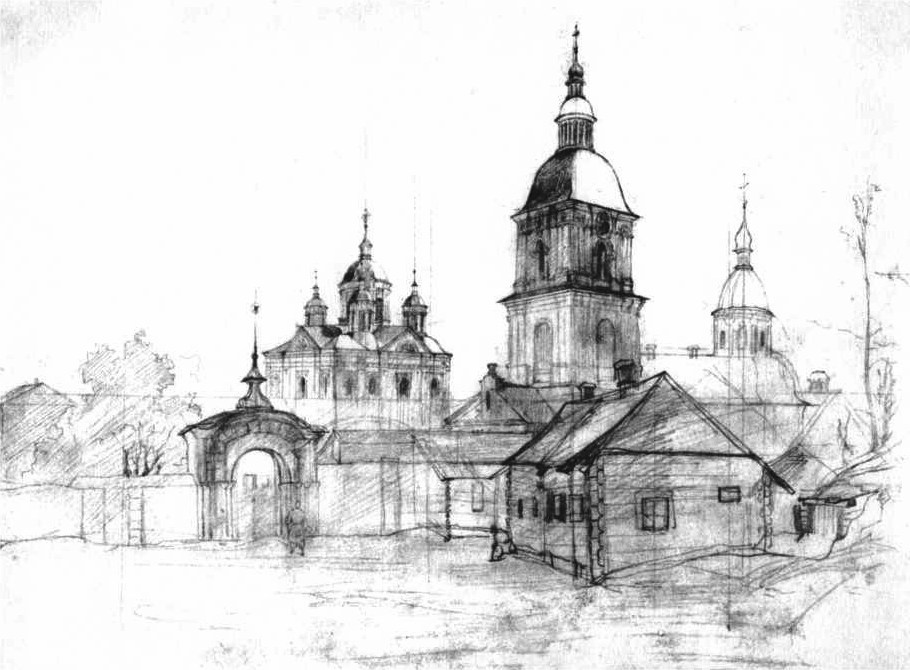
A drawing of the monastery by Ukrainian poet and artist Taras Shevchenko, 1843.

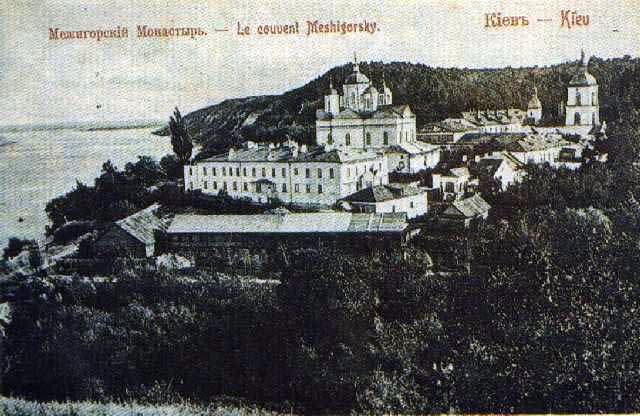
The monastery as seen on an early 20th-century postcard.

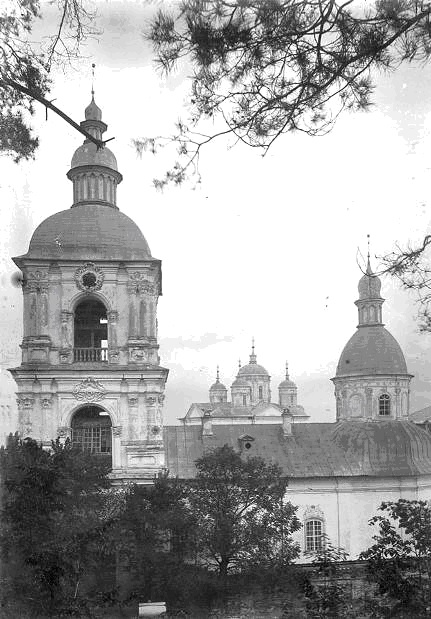
The Transfiguration Cathedral seen shortly before its demolition, 1934.

=== Decline and Soviet demolition ===
A period of decline began with the abolition of the Zaporozhian Host by Catherine II of Russia. In 1786 the Russian Imperial government closed the monastery and confiscated its valuable treasures. The remaining Zaporozhian Cossacks soon afterwards left Zaporizhia, and moved to the Kuban region. There they founded the Kuban Cossack Host, which still exists to this day. The cossacks were able to leave with some of the monastery's manuscripts, some of which are now kept in the Krasnodar Krai Archive.

In 1787, Catherine II of Russia came to Kyiv for a visit and wished to see the Mezhyhirya Monastery. She never got to see it, because the monastery mysteriously burned down the night before her arrival.

In 1796, a German engineer found that the area had suitable clay for the making of faience, and two years later, founded the Mezhyhirya Faience Factory, the first one in Ukraine, at the site of the unused monastery. By 1852, the faience factory had become the largest industrial complex in Kyiv. During its existence, the factory produced a variety of crockery and ornamental vases and figurines. In 1884, the faience factory was closed down after it failed to bring any profit.

In 1894, the Mezhyhirya Monastery was rebuilt and transformed into a women's monastery. After its reconstruction, the monastery was transferred to the authority of the Intercession of the Saints Monastery in Kyiv.

After the Russian Revolution, the Ukrainian Soviet Socialist Republic's capital moved from Kharkiv to Kyiv in 1934, and the city was in need of a suburban residence for government officials. Mezhyhirya was chosen as the site of the new government residence. The decision of the Politburo in April 1935 ordered the demolition of the whole complex. Before the scheduled demolition in 1936, the architecture and buildings of the monastic complex were photographed. During the demolition, an underground library was supposedly discovered, full of handwritten manuscripts. There were speculations that the discovered books belonged to the lost library of Yaroslav the Wise, or perhaps of a later period, during the times of the Zaporozhian Host. But during archaeological excavations from 1990 to 1994, neither the alleged basement nor the purported manuscripts were found. The only thing that remains now of the monastic complex is a water well.

Before the Second World War, the area served as a residence for Ukrainian Soviet leaders Pavel Postyshev, Stanislav Kosior and Nikita Khrushchev. During the German occupation, Reichskommissar Erich Koch lived there. During the postwar era, Leonid Brezhnev and Volodymyr Shcherbytsky resided there. Following the Chernobyl disaster, the residence was abandoned due to its geographical proximity to the accident site, and remained neglected until the early 2000s.

== Hegumen ==
- Athanasius
- Isaiah (Kopinsky)

== See also ==
- Mezhyhirya Chronicle
- Mezhyhirya Residence
