= Hostomel settlement hromada =

Hostomel settlement hromada Гостомельська селищна громада
- Hromada
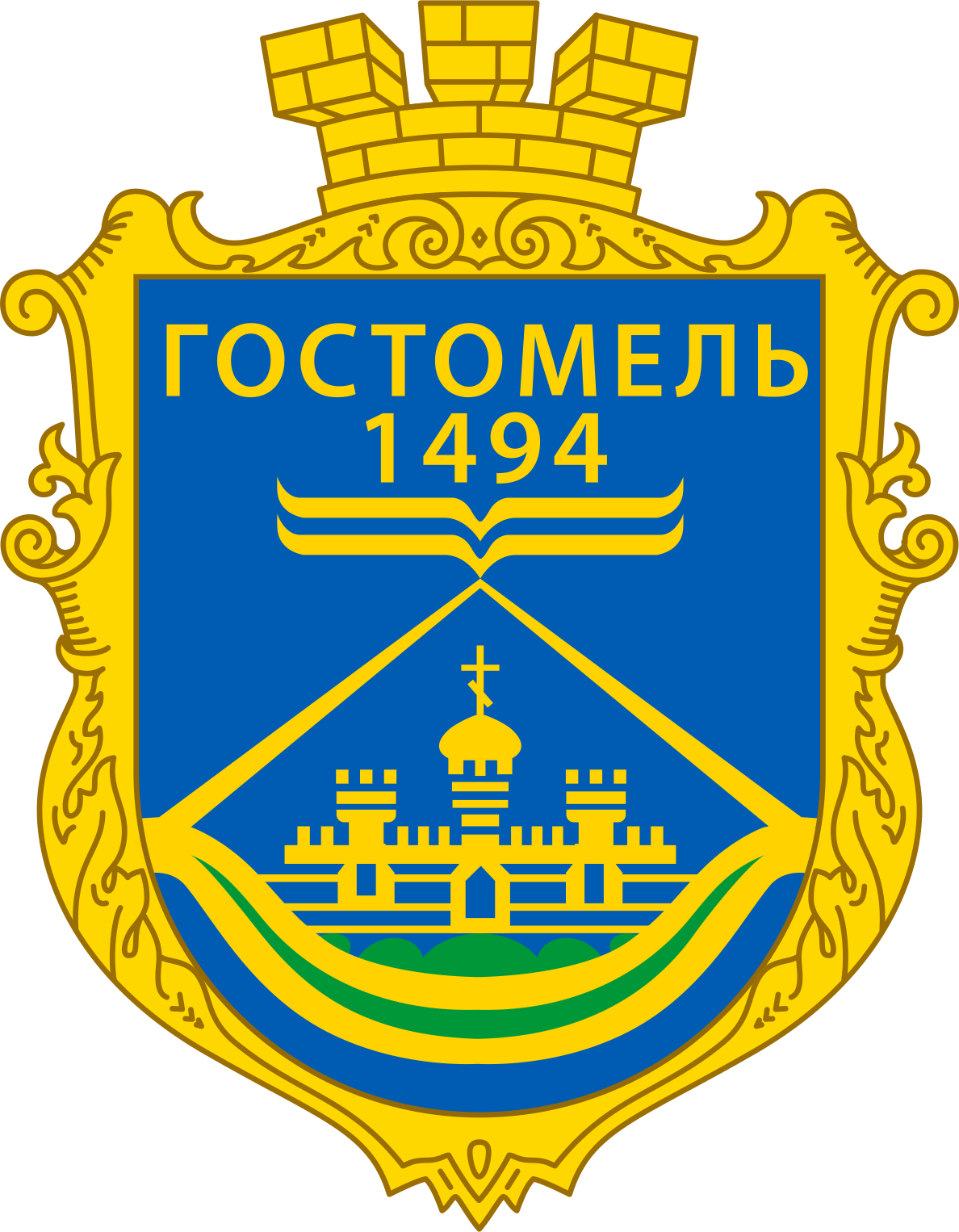
- Seal
- Interactive map of Hostomel settlement hromada
- Country: Ukraine
- Oblast: Kyiv Oblast
- Raion: Bucha Raion
- Admin. center: Hostomel

Area
  - Total: 66.5 km^{2} (25.7 sq mi)

Population (2020)
  - Total: 28,649
  - Density: 431/km^{2} (1,120/sq mi)
- Settlements: 4
- Rural settlements: 1
- Villages: 3

Hostomel settlement hromada (Ukrainian: Гостомельська селищна громада) is a hromada of Ukraine, located in Bucha Raion, Kyiv Oblast. Its administrative center is the city of Hostomel.

It has an area of 66.5 square kilometres (25.7 mi^{2}) and a population of 28,649, as of 2020.

The hromada includes 4 settlements: 1 rural settlement (Hostomel), and 3 villages (Horenka, Moshchun, and Ozera). Each village is the center of its own starosta okruh.

== See also ==
- List of hromadas of Ukraine
