= Order of Zhukov =

State award of the Russian Federation

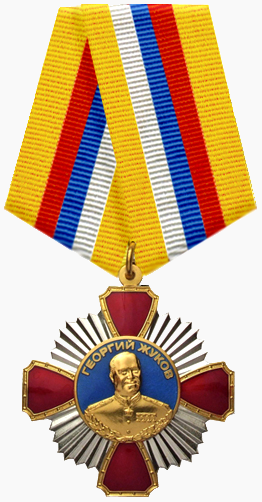
- Order of Zhukov (Obverse)
- Type: Single grade order
- Awarded for: Outstanding military leadership
- Presented by: Russian Federation
- Eligibility: Senior military officers
- Status: Active
- Established: May 9, 1994
- First award: April 25, 1995
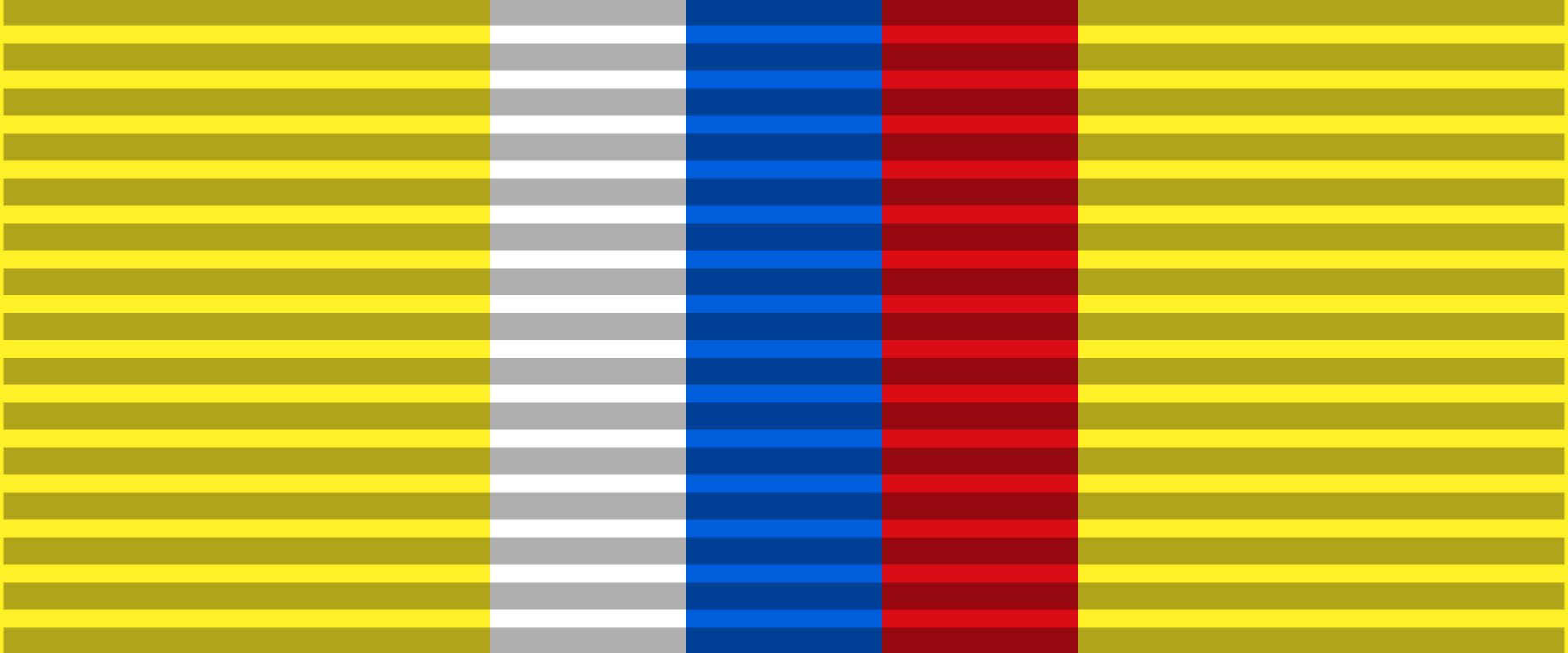
- Ribbon of the Order of Zhukov

Precedence
- Next (higher): Order of Ushakov
- Next (lower): Order of Kutuzov

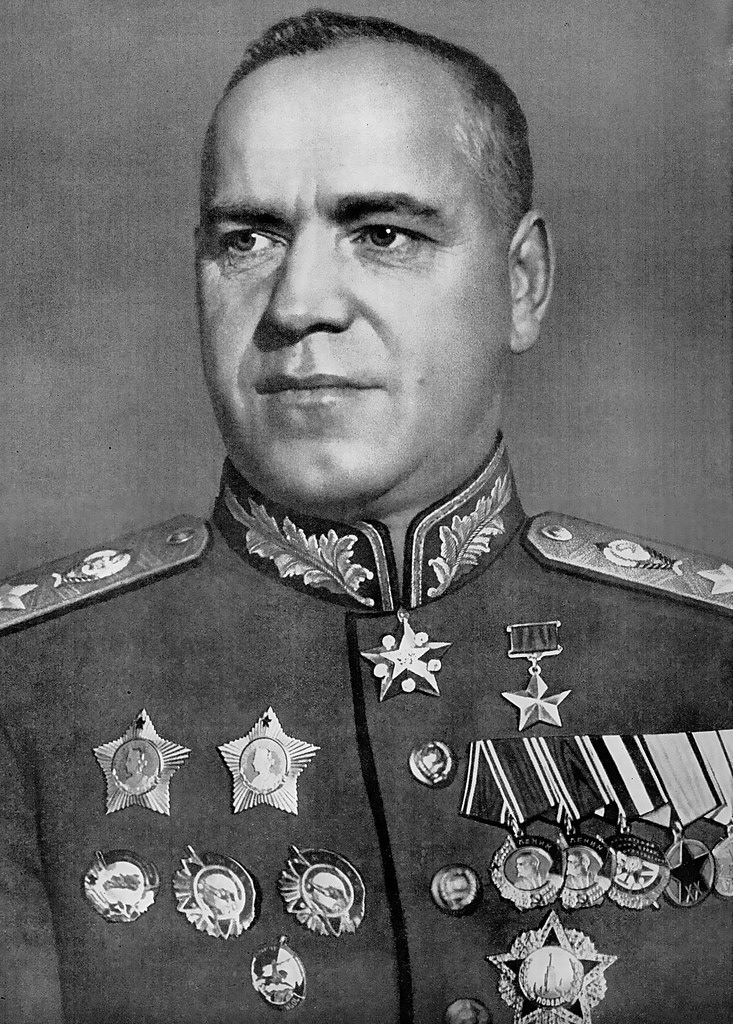
Marshal of the Soviet Union Georgy Zhukov

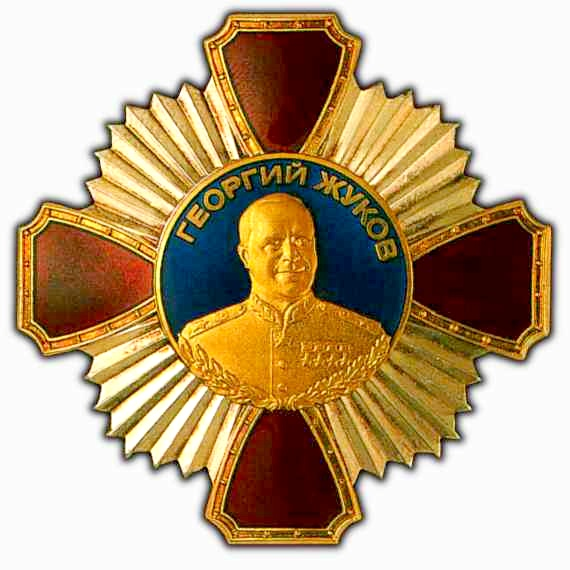
Original Order of Zhukov 1994–2010

The Order of Zhukov (Russian: Орден Жукова) is a military decoration of the Russian Federation. The order is named in honour of Marshal of the Soviet Union Georgy Zhukov (1896–1974).

== History ==
The Order of Zhukov was established by Presidential Decree 930 of May 9, 1994. Its statute was amended by Presidential Decree 243 of March 6, 1995.

The original award was a 50 millimetres (2.0 in) wide gilt cross pattée, the four arms were enamelled in red with a gilt border with alternating raised and recessed rims giving the appearance of shields. At the center, a 24 millimetres (0.94 in) diameter blue enamelled medallion bearing the gold plated silver relief bust of Georgy Zhukov, below him, interlaced laurel and oak branches. Above the bust of Zhukov, the gilded inscription "ГЕОРГИЙ ЖУКОВ" (GEORGY ZHUKOV). Between the cross arms, embossed gilt rays protruding from the center outward forming a 45 millimetres (1.8 in) wide square with rounded corners. The reverse of the Order had a threaded stud with a nut to secure it to clothing. The Order of Zhukov was worn on the right side of the chest with other similar orders.

== New statute ==
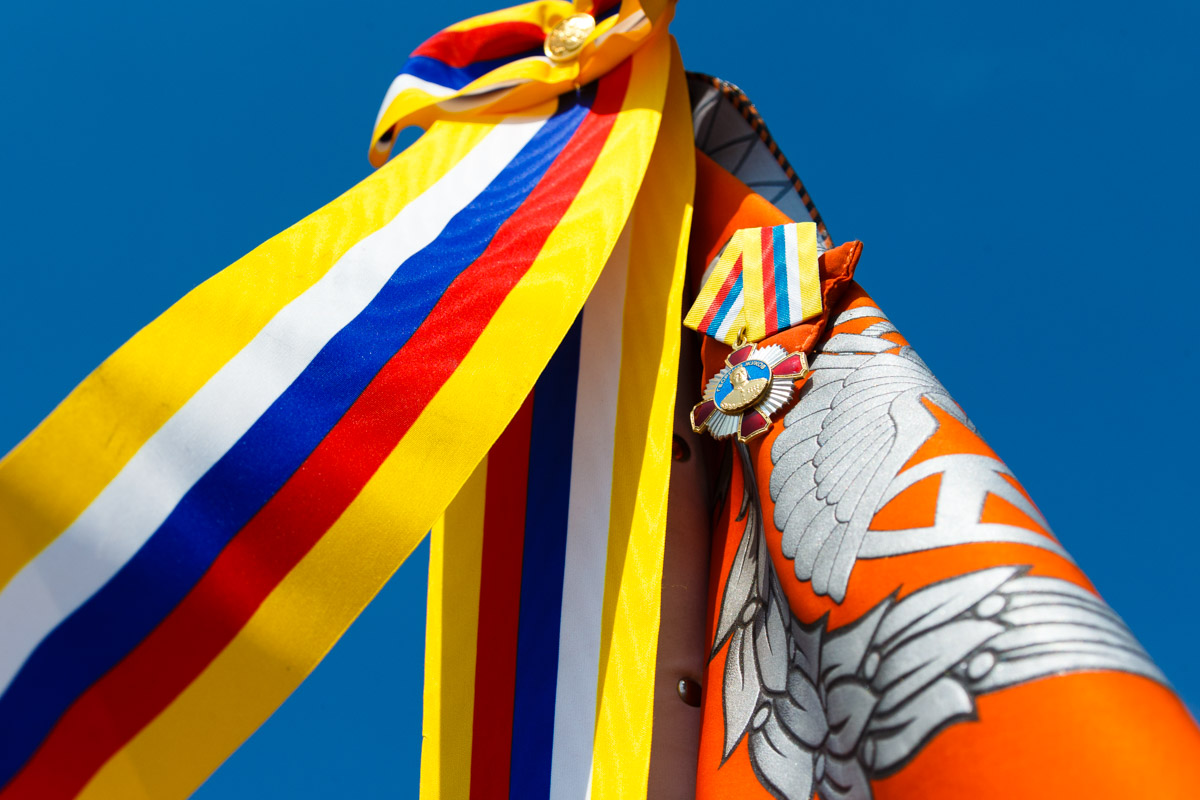
Regalia of the Order of Zhukov on the banner of the 39th Separate Railway Brigade of the Southern Military District

The entire Russian Federation award system was revamped by Presidential Decree 1099 of September 7, 2010. This major rework included a redesign of the Order and amendments to its statute.

The Order of Zhukov is awarded to commanders of military units and their deputies from among the senior officers: for skillful organization of troops (forces) and operations in strategic areas (theatres), or military operations during which, despite the numerical superiority of the enemy, the objectives of the operation were met; for skillful manoeuvres on land and in the air to surround the enemy, enabling the defeat of superior forces; for initiative and determination in choosing a site and time of a main attack which led to the defeat of the enemy on land and/or in the air while maintaining the combat readiness and capability to further prosecute; for carrying out a defensive breakout from an enemy encirclement for a future offensive, for the organization, the prosecution, the choice of environment and the defeat of the enemy; for tenacity in repelling enemy attacks from the air, land and sea, for keeping enemy troops pinned down in designated areas of responsibility to create conditions favourable for seizing the initiative and depriving the enemy's ability to continue offensive operations; for skilful organization and management of units of the Armed Forces of the Russian Federation stationed outside of the Russian Federation, for repelling an armed attack on them, as well as the protection of citizens of the Russian Federation from attack outside of the Russian Federation.

The Order of Zhukov may be awarded to military units and formations involved in conducting operations on land and in the air, during which, despite the stubborn resistance of the enemy, the objectives of the operations were met with full operational capability of military units retained. May also be awarded to foreign citizens - soldiers of allied forces from among the senior officers who took part alongside soldiers of the Russian Federation, for organizing and conducting successful joint operations of allied troops (forces). The Order may be awarded posthumously.

== Award description ==
The Order of Zhukov is a 40 millimetres (1.6 in) wide gilt cross pattée, the four arms are enamelled in red with a gilt border with alternating raised and recessed rims giving the appearance of shields. At the center, a blue enamelled medallion bearing the gold plated silver relief bust of Georgy Zhukov half turned to the right, below him, interlaced laurel and oak branches. Above the bust of Zhukov, the gilded inscription "ГЕОРГИЙ ЖУКОВ" (GEORGY ZHUKOV). Between the cross arms, embossed gilt rays protruding from the center outward forming a 35 millimetres (1.4 in) wide square with rounded corners. On the otherwise plain reverse, a raised letter "N" and a line for the award serial number.

The Order is suspended by a ring through the award's suspension loop to a standard Russian pentagonal mount covered by a 24 millimetres (0.94 in) wide yellow silk moiré ribbon with three 4 millimetres (0.16 in) wide central stripes of white, blue and red.

The Russian Federation order of precedence dictates that the Order of Zhukov is to be worn on the left side of the chest, and in the presence of other orders of the Russian Federation, is to be located immediately after the Order of Ushakov.

== Recipients (partial list) ==
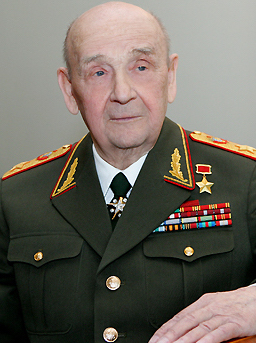
Marshal of the Soviet Union Sergei Sokolov, a recipient of the Order of Zhukov

The following individuals were the original recipients during the first investiture ceremony of the Order of Zhukov in April 1995.

- Konstantin Abramov, Colonel-General, retired;
- Gabriel Tarasovich Vasilenko, Lieutenant-General, retired;
- Davidkov Victor I., Colonel-General, retired;
- Zaharov George Nefedovich, Air Force Major-General, retired;
- Georgy Zimin, Air Marshal, retired;
- Kazbek Drisovich Karsanov, Major-General of Artillery, retired;
- Kozhanov Constantine G., Colonel-General, retired;
- Oleg Losik, Marshal of Armored Troops, retired;
- Lyaschenko Nicholas G., General of the Army, retired;
- Pavlovsky Ivan G., General of the Army, retired;
- Vasily Yakovlevich Petrenko, Lieutenant-General, retired;
- Podgorny Ivan D., Colonel-General, retired;
- Anatoly Ivanovich Pushkin, Air Force Lieutenant-General, retired;
- Sergeev Nikolai, Admiral of the Fleet, retired;
- Sokolov Sergei Leonidovich, Marshal of the Soviet Union, retired.

== See also ==
- Awards and decorations of the Russian Federation
- Medal of Zhukov
- Awards and decorations of the Soviet Union
