= National Museum-Reserve of Ukrainian Military Achievements =

History museum in Ukraine

- Національний музей-заповідник української військової звитяги
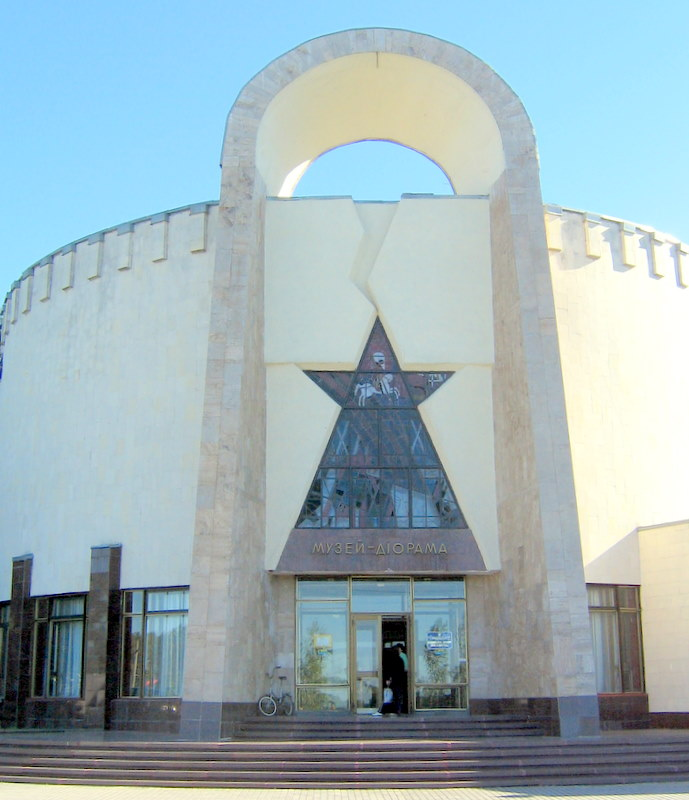
- Established: 20 March 1945; 81 years ago
- Location: Novi Petrivtsi, Ukraine
- Coordinates: 50°37′29″N 30°25′12″E
- Type: Military museum
- Director: Ivan Petrovich Vìkovan
- Curator: Ministry of Culture of the Kyiv Regional State Administration
- Website: battle-kyiv.org.ua

Immovable Monument of National Significance of Ukraine
- Official name: Пам'ятник-музей визволителям м. Києва від фашистських загарбників в 1943 році (Memorial-museum of liberators of Kyiv from fascist invaders in 1943)
- Type: History, Monumental Art
- Reference no.: 100008-Н

The National Museum-Reserve of Ukrainian Military Achievements, (Note: Ukrainian: Національний музей-заповідник української військової звитяги, romanized: Natsionalnyi muzey-zapovidnyk ukrainskoi viyskovoi zvytiagy) is a museum reserve dedicated to Ukrainian military achievements. The museum is located on the outskirts of the village of Novi Petrivtsi, Vyshhorod Raion of Kyiv Oblast, Ukraine.

The curator of the museum is the Ministry of Culture of the Kyiv Regional State Administration. The current museum director is Ivan Petrovich Vìkovan. The Museum was created by the Council of People's Commissars of Ukraine and the Central Committee of VKP (b) as the Museum-Reserve "Battle for Kyiv 1943" on March 20, 1945. In 2008, the museum was granted national status. On 9 June 2023, at the initiative of the museum, Kyiv Regional Council renamed it the National Museum-Reserve of Ukrainian military achievements. To date, the museum has been visited by more than 10 million people from 85 countries of the world. The museum maintains stationary and mobile exhibitions.

== Exposition ==
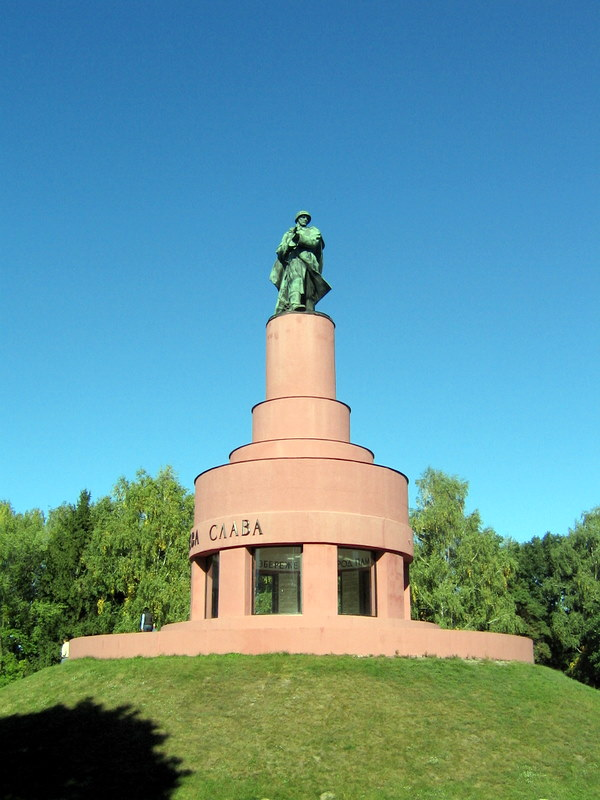
Monument to the liberators of Kyiv

The museum exposition tells about Ukrainian military achievements. The exhibit includes archaeological, ethnographic, numismatic collection, art crafts, paintings, sculptures, photos, and documents.

The historical-cultural complex includes:

- A territory with an area of 8 hectares, the observation points of the 1st Ukrainian Front Army General Nikolai Fyodorovich Vatutin, Commander of the 38th Army Kyrylo Moskalenko, a member of the Military Council of the front Lieutenant General Nikita Khrushchev, Commander of the 3rd Guards Tank Army Pavlo Rybalko;
- Samples of military equipment from the time of the war;
- Monument to the liberators of Kyiv. This monument that commemorates the liberation of Kyiv from the Nazis was built by decision of the Government of the Ukrainian Soviet Socialist Republic on March 28, 1957. The architects Abraham Miletsky and V. V. Baklanov together with the sculptor Iván Pershudchev were in charge of the work;
- Diorama titled "The Battle for Kyiv Lyutezh Bridgehead 1943." Which opened on May 5, 1980. The dimensions of the canvas are 29 x 7. Created by M. S. Prisekin;
- Memorial complex in the village of Novi Petrivtsi;
- Museum-diorama of 1100 meters. This section has showrooms that exhibit dioramas. It was opened in honor of the 50th anniversary of the liberation of Kyiv in 1993;
- Monument to the heroes of the bridgehead of Liutz. Built in 1983 in honor of the 40th anniversary of the Battle of the Dnieper and the liberation of Kyiv from Nazi invaders. There's a big commemorative sign that reads: "To the heroes of the Liutz bridgehead";
- The wall of memory. It has high reliefs of heroes from the war. It was established for the 70th anniversary of the liberation of Kyiv in 2013.

Since 2014, the museum has been highlighting the feat and heroism of the participants of the Revolution of Dignity, the war in Donbas and the full-scale invasion.

== Scientific work ==
The staff of the museum are working with research materials of war and the study of materials from the history of Kyiv Polissya. Savior of the Transfiguration monastery is a monastery of the Zaporozhian Cossacks during the 17th and 18th centuries.

== Gallery ==
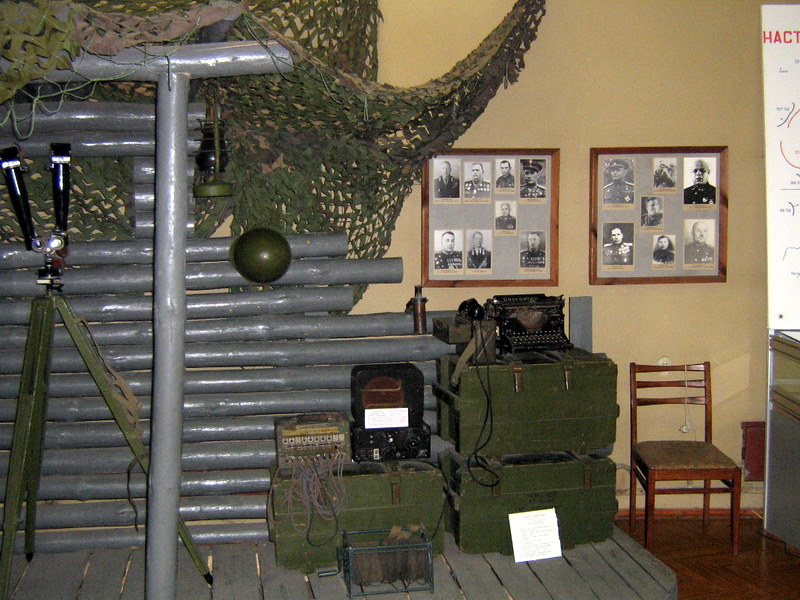
Space of general Nikolai Fyodorovich Vatutin

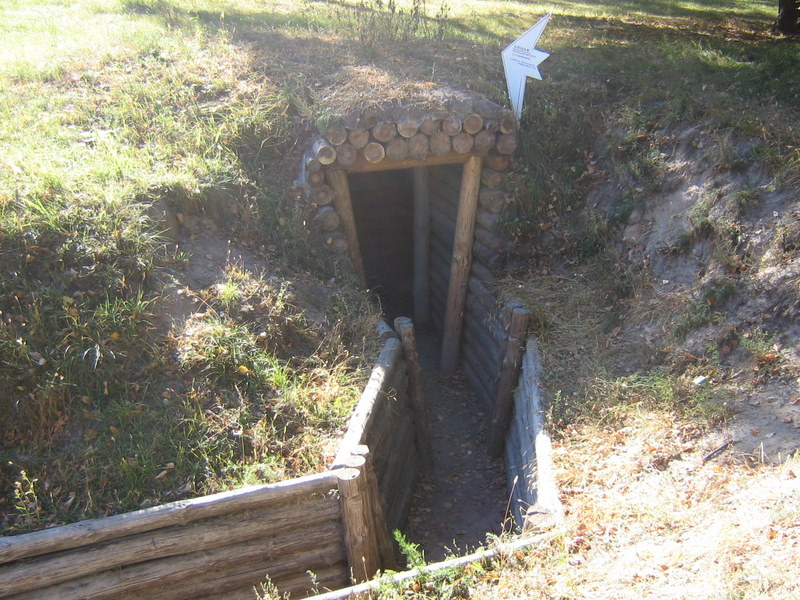
War trench

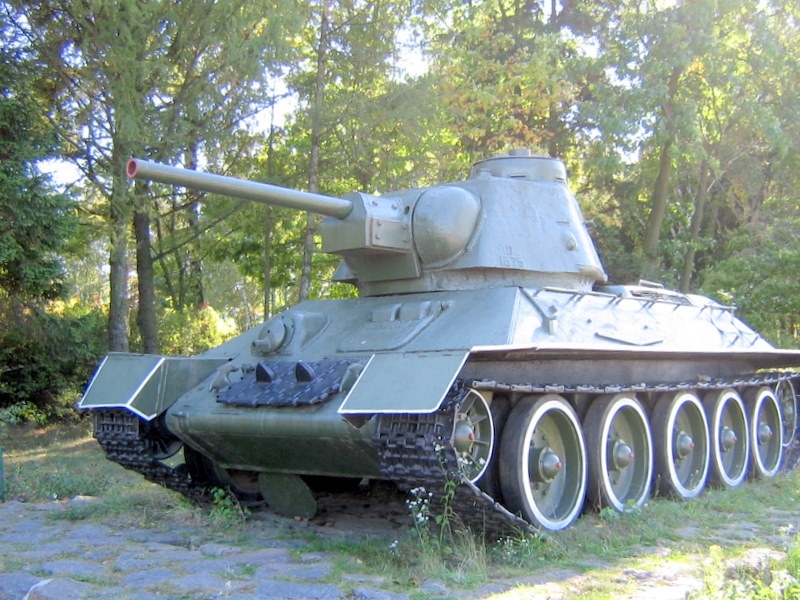
Soviet medium tank T-34

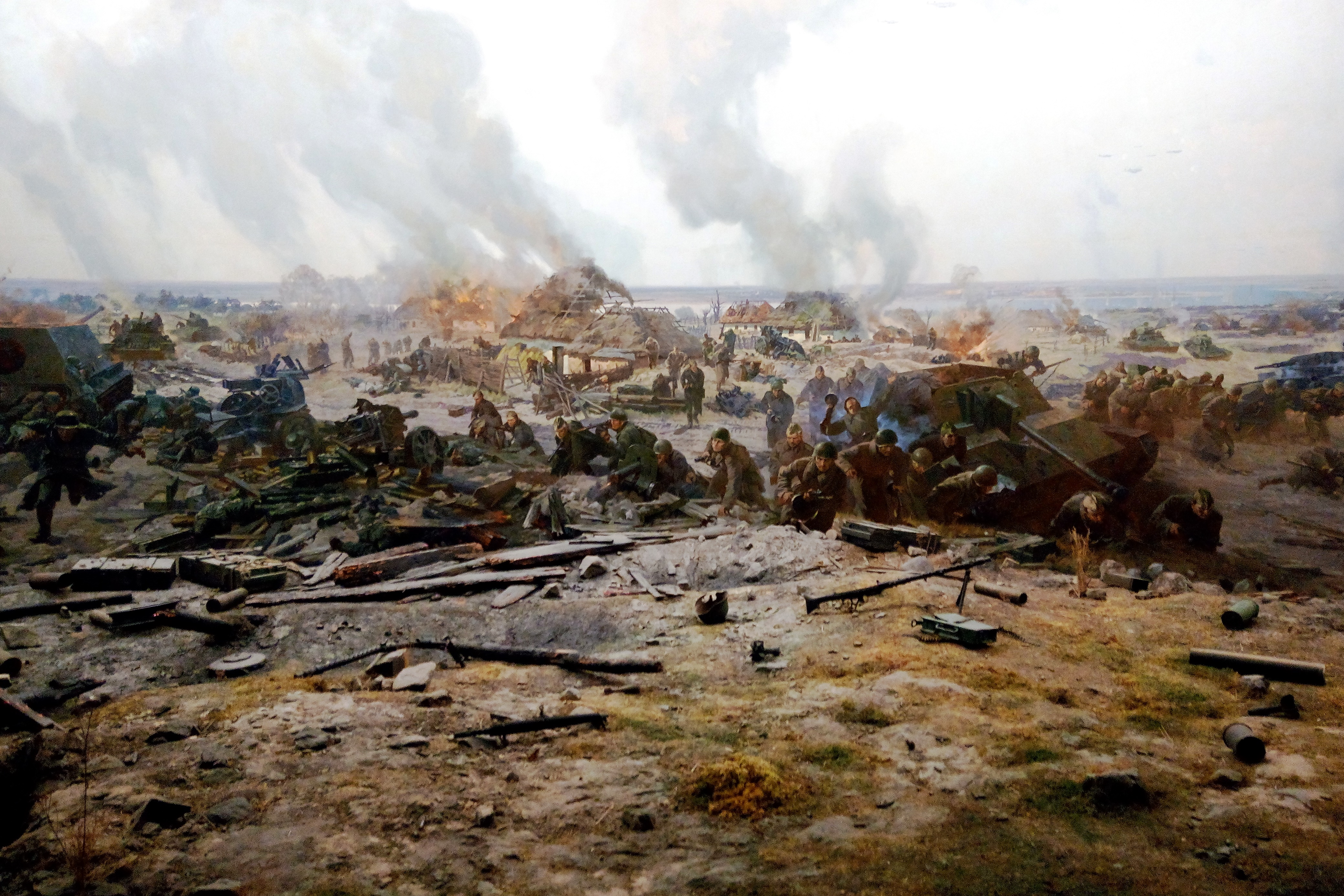
Diorama "Battle for Kyiv"

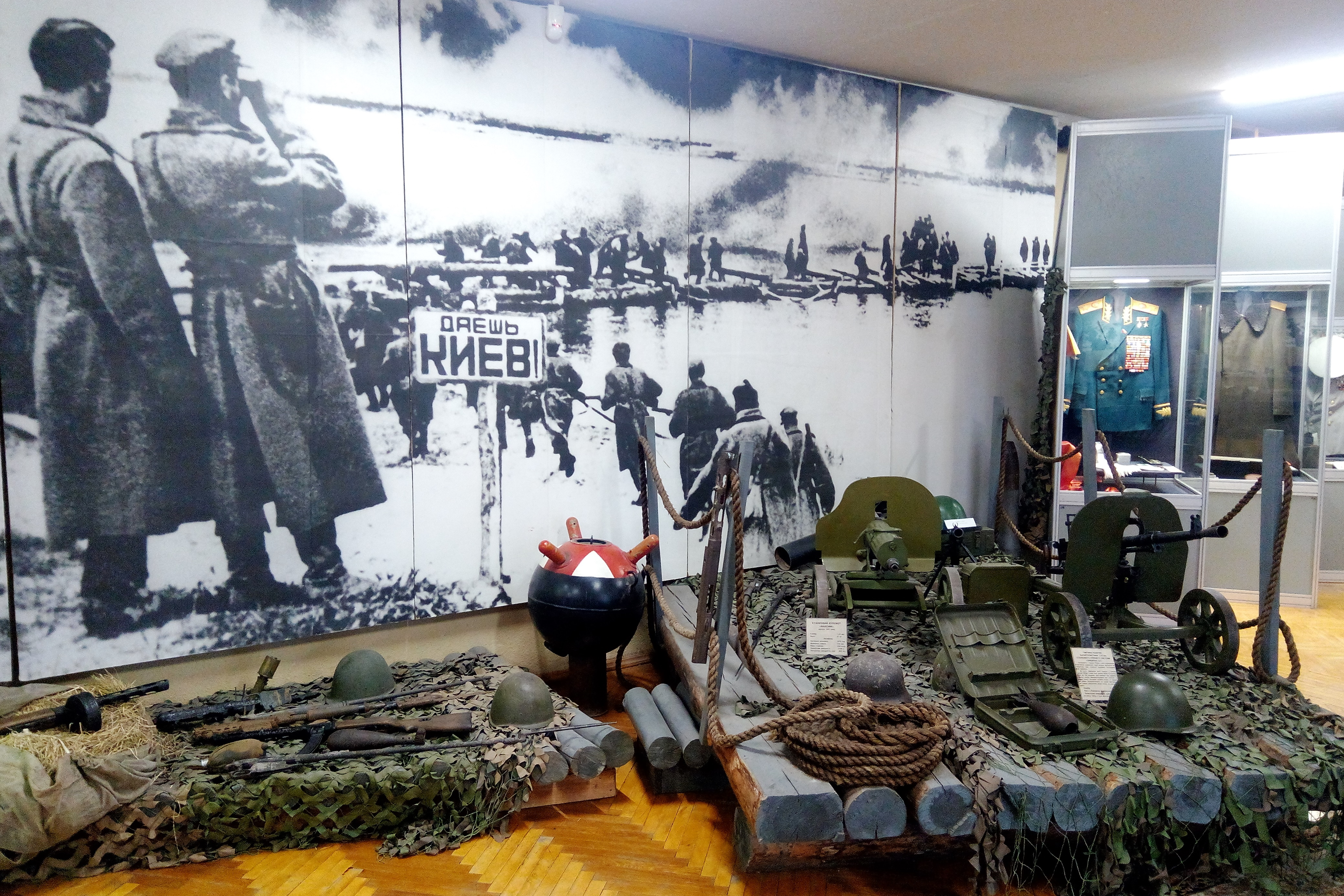
Military equipment

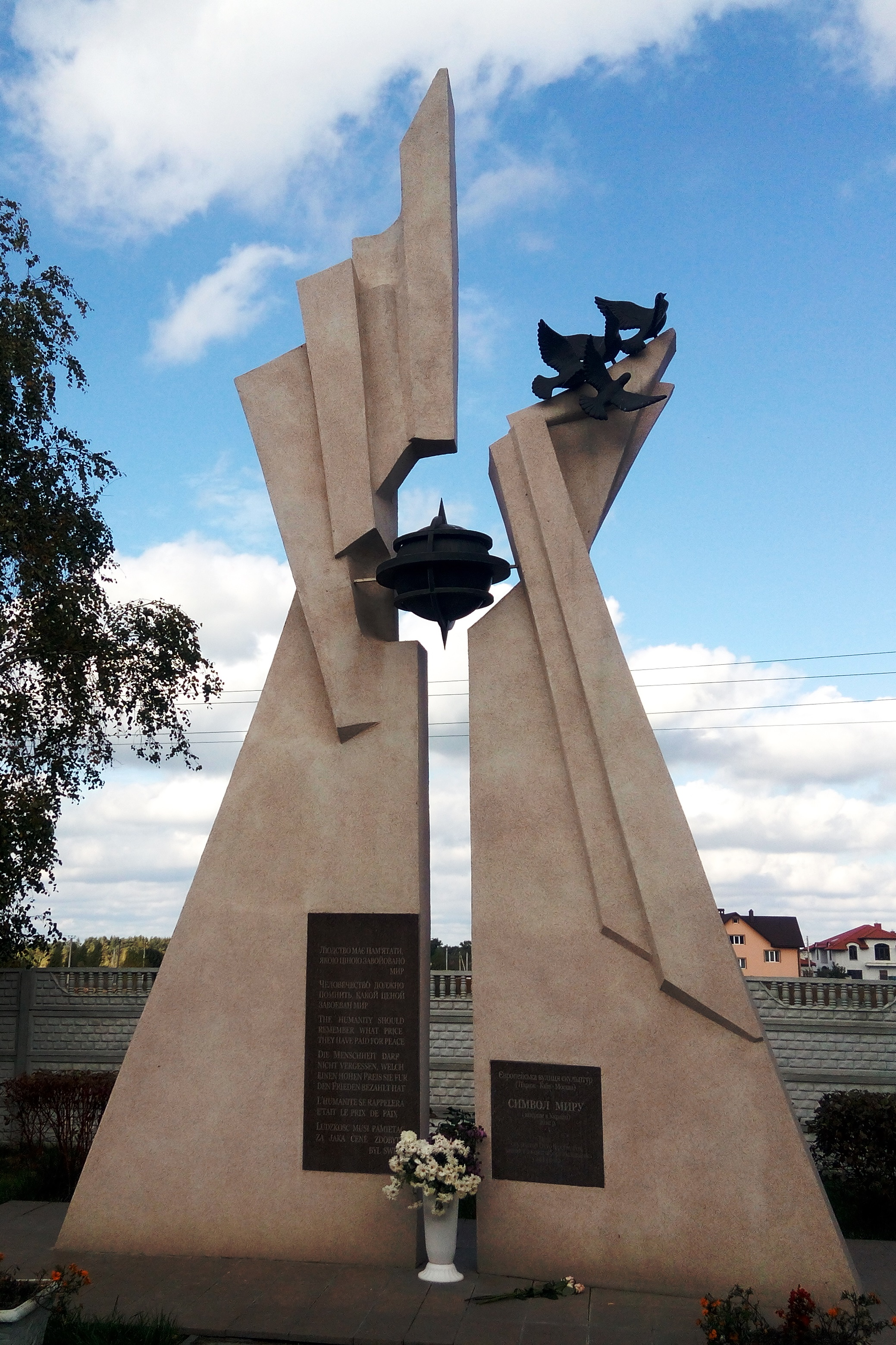
Peace symbol

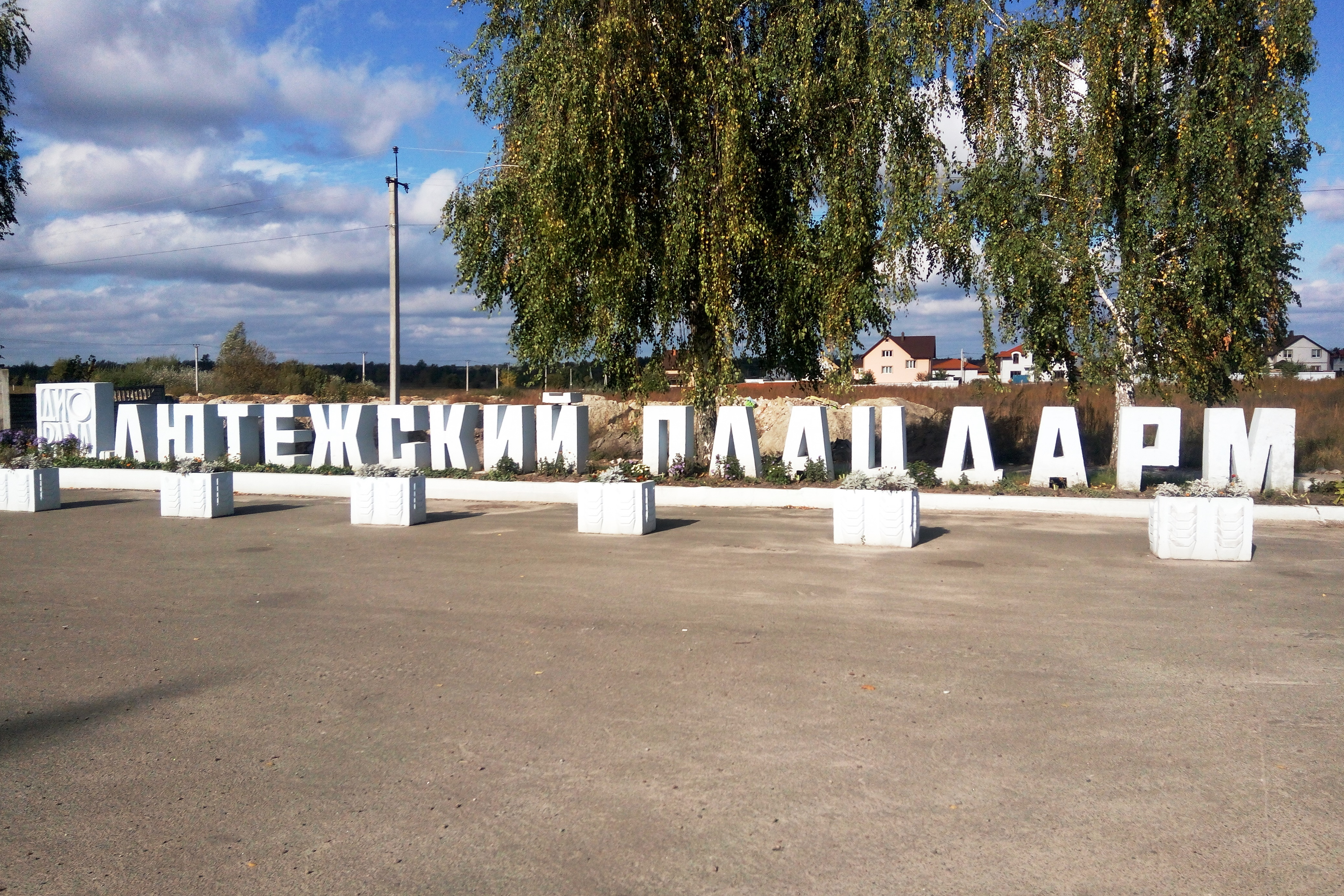
Monument to the heroes of the bridgehead of Liutz
