= Leonid Makhnovets =

Ukrainian literary critic, historian, and archaeologist (1919–1993)

Leonid Makhnovets in 1950

Leonid Yefremovych Makhnovets (Ukrainian: Леоні́д Єфре́мович Махнове́ць; 31 May 1919 – 19 January 1993) was a Ukrainian literary critic, historian, archaeologist, interpreter, bibliographer. He was a Doctor of Philological Sciences (1966) and a recipient of the Shevchenko National Prize (1990) for the preparation and publication of the Rus' Chronicle according to the Hypatian Codex. Makhnovets was the author and co-author of 400 works, and a compiler and editor of publications of the Shevchenko Institute of Literature.

Makhnovets was born on 31 May 1919 in the village of Ozera, Kiev Governorate, Ukrainian People's Republic (today Bucha Raion, Kyiv Oblast).

After the fourth year at philology faculty of Kyiv University, Makhnovets served in World War II. He graduated in 1947. After that, Makhnovets began his doctorate studies at the Shevchenko Institute of Literature (National Academy of Sciences of Ukraine), graduating in 1950.

In 1950–1955 he was a researcher at the Shevchenko State Museum. In 1955–72 Makhnovets worked at the Shevchenko Institute of Literature (National Academy of Sciences of Ukraine) from where he was groundlessly fired. Only an invitation to work at Harvard University forced the Soviet government of Ukraine to allow him to return to scientific research. In 1975-85 Makhnovets worked as a researcher at the Institute of Archaeology (National Academy of Sciences of Ukraine).

He researched the history of literature and culture of Ukraine, including the period of Kievan Rus'. Makhnovets translated and commented on The Tale of Igor's Campaign (1970) and the Rus' Chronicle according to the Hypatian Codex (1989), creating several detailed indices.

Makhnovets died on 19 January 1993 in Kyiv, Ukraine.
