= Mezhyhirya Chronicle =

The Mezhyhirya Chronicle (Ukrainian: Межигі́рський літо́пис, romanized: Mezhyhirs'kyy litopys) is a Ukrainian chronicle from the 17th century, written in Late Ruthenian, also known as early modern Ukrainian. Its author is considered to be Ilya Koshchakivskyi, the abbot of the former Mezhyhirya Monastery, modern Kyiv Oblast. The first manuscript contains a description of historical events in Volhynia and Kyiv Region in 1393–1620. The second manuscript provides information from 1608 to 1700 about the liberation struggle of the Ukrainian people against the Polish gentry and Turkish-Tatar incursions. As a monument of historical literature, the Mezhyhirya Chronicle occupies a significant place in the Ukrainian historiography of the 17th century. The editio princeps was published in the Collection of Chronicles Relating to the History of Southern and Western Rus' (1888).

== Overview ==
This is a typical example of the so-called short Cossack chronicle of the 17th century (see Cossack chronicles). Judging by its character, patriotic mood, and almost lively vernacular, it is possible to assert that its author was one of the educated Cossacks who lived out his life in the Mezhyhiria Monastery. The chronicle consists of 41 stories covering historical events from 1608 to 1700. Of these, 13 are directly or indirectly related to the monastery itself, which throughout its two-hundred-year history maintained the closest ties with the Zaporozhian Sich (in the 2nd half of the 17th century, the Zaporozhian Cossacks considered the Free Lands of the Zaporozhian Lowland Host to be a 'parish' of the Mezhyhirya Monastery). The chronicle describes the most important historical and political events of the first half of the 17th century throughout Ukraine, especially the anti-Polish Cossack wars led by hetmans Marko Zhmaylo, Vasyl Tomylenko, Pavlo Pavliuk, Yakiv Ostryanyn, and colonel Karpo Skydan. The author writes that the defeat of the latter was associated with the founding of the Chuhuiv Sloboda, as well as the appointment of Polish colonels to Cossack regiments in 1638 (see Ordinance of the Zaporozhian Host). The work mentions prominent Ukrainian cultural and church figures Job Boretsky, Petro Mohyla, Sylvester Kosiv, Innocent (Giesel), as well as the names of Polish kings, generals, Muscovite tsars, voivodes, and patriarchs.

The author describes in detail the course of the Cossack uprising led by Bohdan Khmelnytsky. The author writes about the policies of Bohdan Khmelnytsky's successors, from Yuriy Khmelnytsky to Ivan Mazepa, the alliance of Petro Doroshenko with the Ottoman sultan Mehmed IV, and Russo-Ukrainian relations of political significance. Among the historical events of the second half of the 17th century, he highlights the devastation of Kyiv by the army of Prince Janusz Radziwiłł and the defeat of Vasily Sheremetev's troops in the Battle of Chudnov, the campaign of the Polish king John II Casimir Vasa, and focuses on the breakdown of relations between the left-bank hetman Ivan Briukhovetsky with Moscow, notes the unsuccessful campaign of I. Samoilovych and Prince V. Holitsyn to Crimea (see Crimean campaigns of 1687 and 1689), the campaign of Ivan Mazepa and B. Sheremetiev to the fortress of Kazikerman (now Beryslav) and the participation of Cossack regiments under the leadership of Y. Lyzohub in the conquest of Azov (see also Azov-Dnipro campaigns of 1695–1696).

The chronicle describes some Tatar-Turkish incursions into Ukraine and the devastation of Poltava, Pereiaslav, Chyhyryn, Kamianets (now Kamianets-Podilskyi), and events that took place in Moscow in the last quarter of the 17th century. Some stories describe natural disasters: the fire in the Kyiv Castle, dry years, severe frosts, locust invasions, plague, earthquakes, a solar eclipse, etc.

== Sources and literature ==
- Ya. I. Dzyra. Межигірський козацький літопис // Encyclopedia of History of Ukraine, Volume 6 (2009), p. 585. ISBN 978-966-00-1028-1.
- Hayday L. (2000). Історія України в особах, термінах, назвах і поняттях [The History of Ukraine in Persons, Terms, Names and Concepts] (in Ukrainian). Lutsk: Vezha. p. 277.
- Skaba A.D., ed. (1971). Soviet Encyclopaedia of the History of Ukraine. ed. volume 3 (in Ukrainian). Kyiv: Main editorial office of the Ukrainian Soviet Encyclopedia.
