= Stari Petrivtsi =

Village in Kyiv Oblast, Ukraine

Stari Petrivtsi Старі Петрівці
- Village
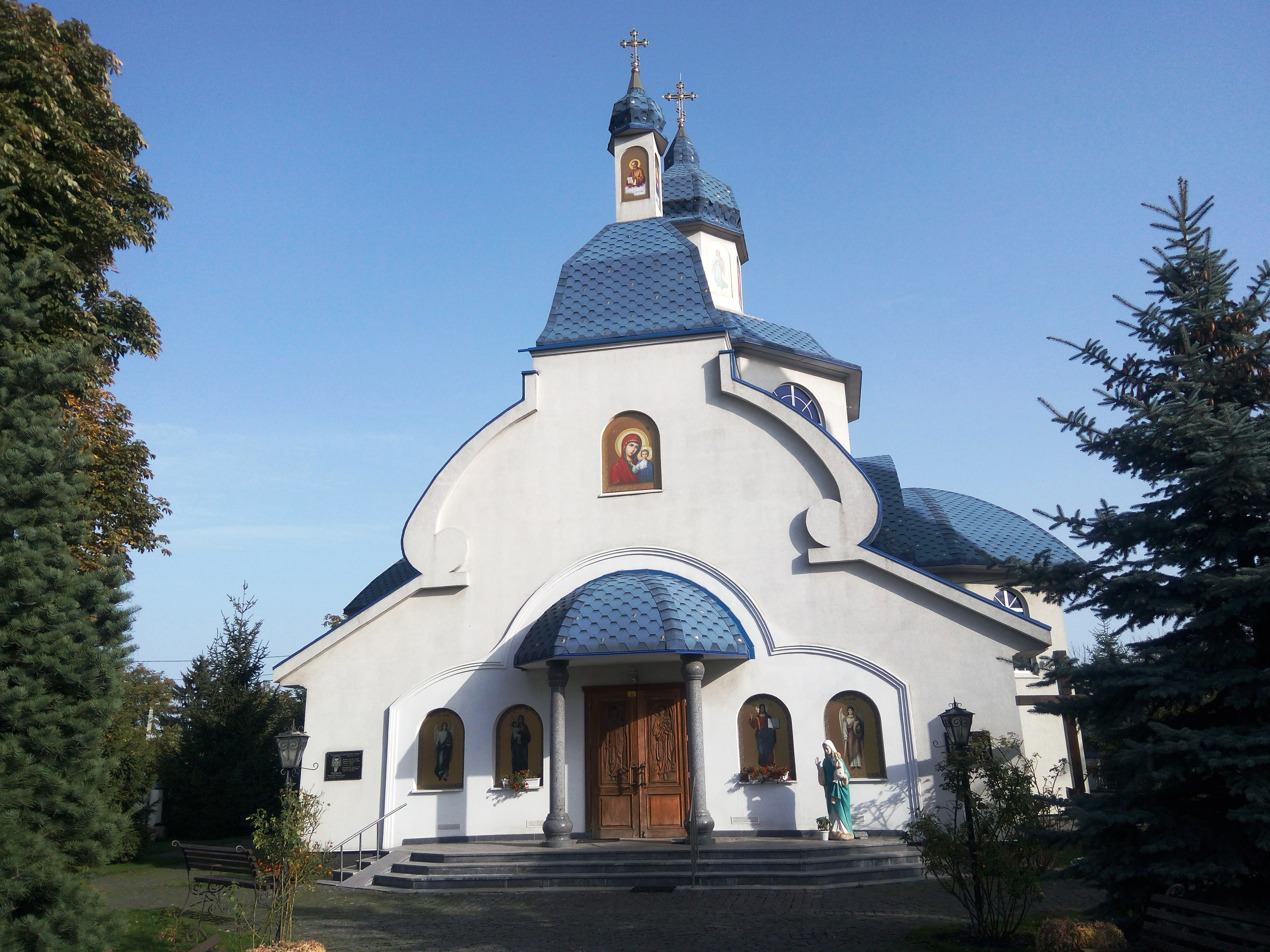
- A church

- Coat of arms
- Interactive map of Stari Petrivtsi
- Location of Stari Petrivtsi in Kyiv Oblast Stari Petrivtsi (Kyiv Oblast)
- Coordinates: 50.6525°N 30.415833°E
- Country: Ukraine
- Oblast: Kyiv Oblast
- Raion: Vyshhorod Raion
- Founded: 1700

Area
  - Total: 4.0 km^{2} (1.5 sq mi)
- Elevation: 154 m (505 ft)

Population (2001 census)
  - Total: 2,963
  - Density: 740/km^{2} (1,900/sq mi)
- Time zone: UTC+2 (EET)
  - Summer (DST): UTC+3 (EEST)
- Postal code: 07353
- Area code: +380 4596

Stari Petrivtsi (Ukrainian: Старі Петрівці; Russian: Старые Петровцы) is a village in Vyshhorod Raion (district) in Kyiv Oblast of Ukraine, at about 23.28 kilometres (14.47 mi) northwest by north (NWbN) from the centre of Kyiv, on the right (western) bank of the Dnipro river.

It belongs to Petrivtsi rural hromada, one of the hromadas of Ukraine. The village suffered damages during a Russian missile attack in June 2023, during the Russian invasion of Ukraine.
