= Kiev uezd =

Uezd in Kiev Governorate Russian Empire

Kiev uezd Киевский уезд
- Uezd
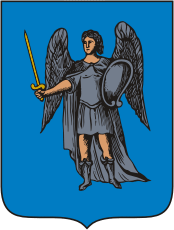
- Coat of arms

- Location in the Kiev Governorate
- Country: Russian Empire
- Krai: Southwestern
- Governorate: Kiev
- Established: 1796
- Abolished: 1925
- Capital: Kiev

Area
  - Total: 5,654.23 km^{2} (2,183.11 sq mi)

Population (1897)
  - Total: 541,483
  - Density: 95.7660/km^{2} (248.033/sq mi)

The Kiev uezd (Russian: Киевский уезд; Ukrainian: Київський повіт, romanized: Kyivs'kyi povit) was one of the subdivisions of the Kiev Governorate of the Russian Empire. It was situated in the eastern part of the governorate. Its administrative centre was Kiev.

== Demographics ==
At the time of the Russian Empire Census of 1897, Kievsky Uyezd had a population of 541,483. Of these, 56.2% spoke Ukrainian, 26.6% Russian, 11.1% Yiddish, 3.4% Polish, 1.1% German, 0.8% Belarusian, 0.2% Czech, 0.2% Tatar, 0.1% Bashkir and 0.1% French as their native language.
