= Novi Petrivtsi =

Rural locality in Kyiv Oblast, Ukraine

Novi Petrivtsi Нові Петрівці
- Village
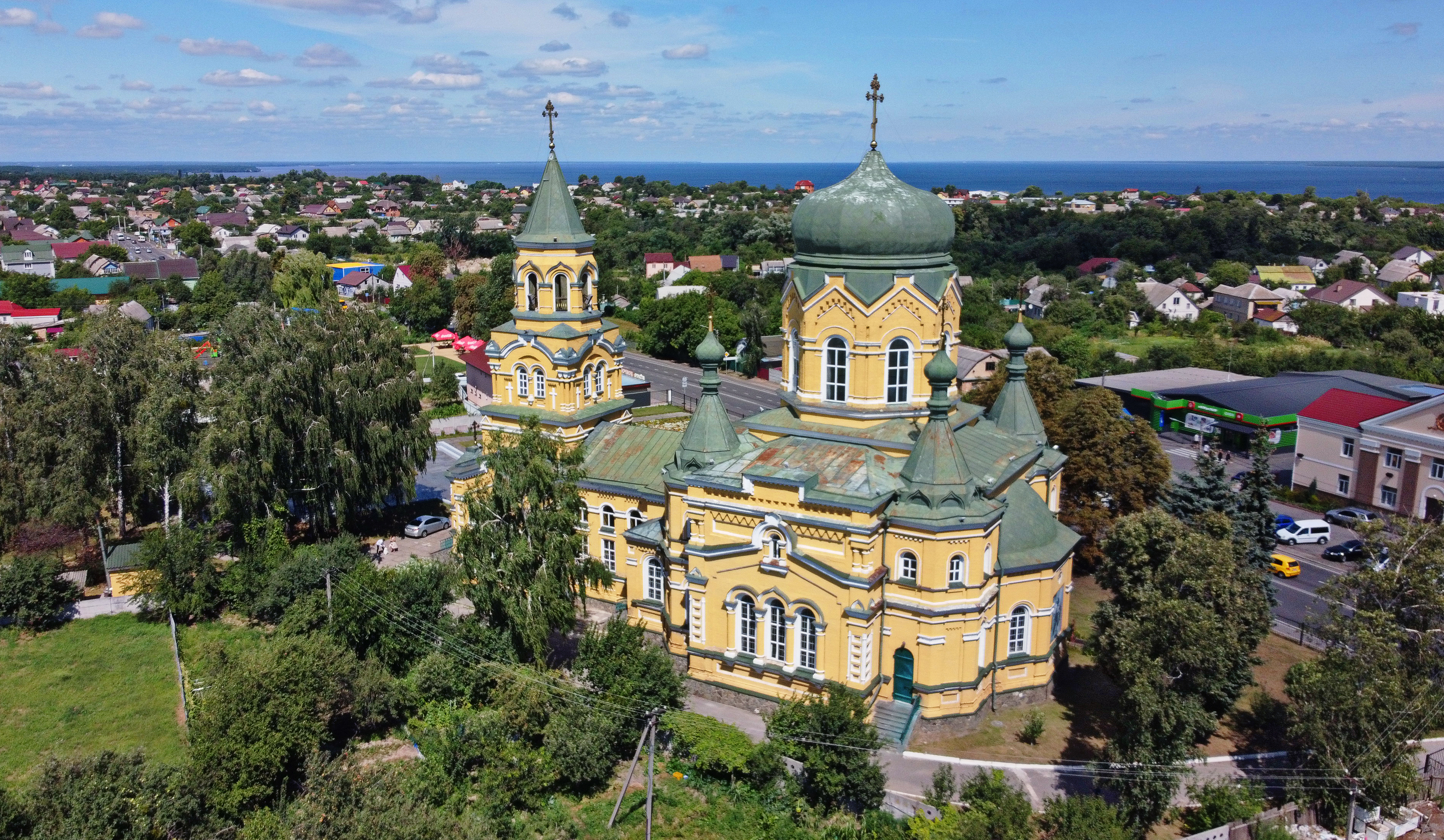

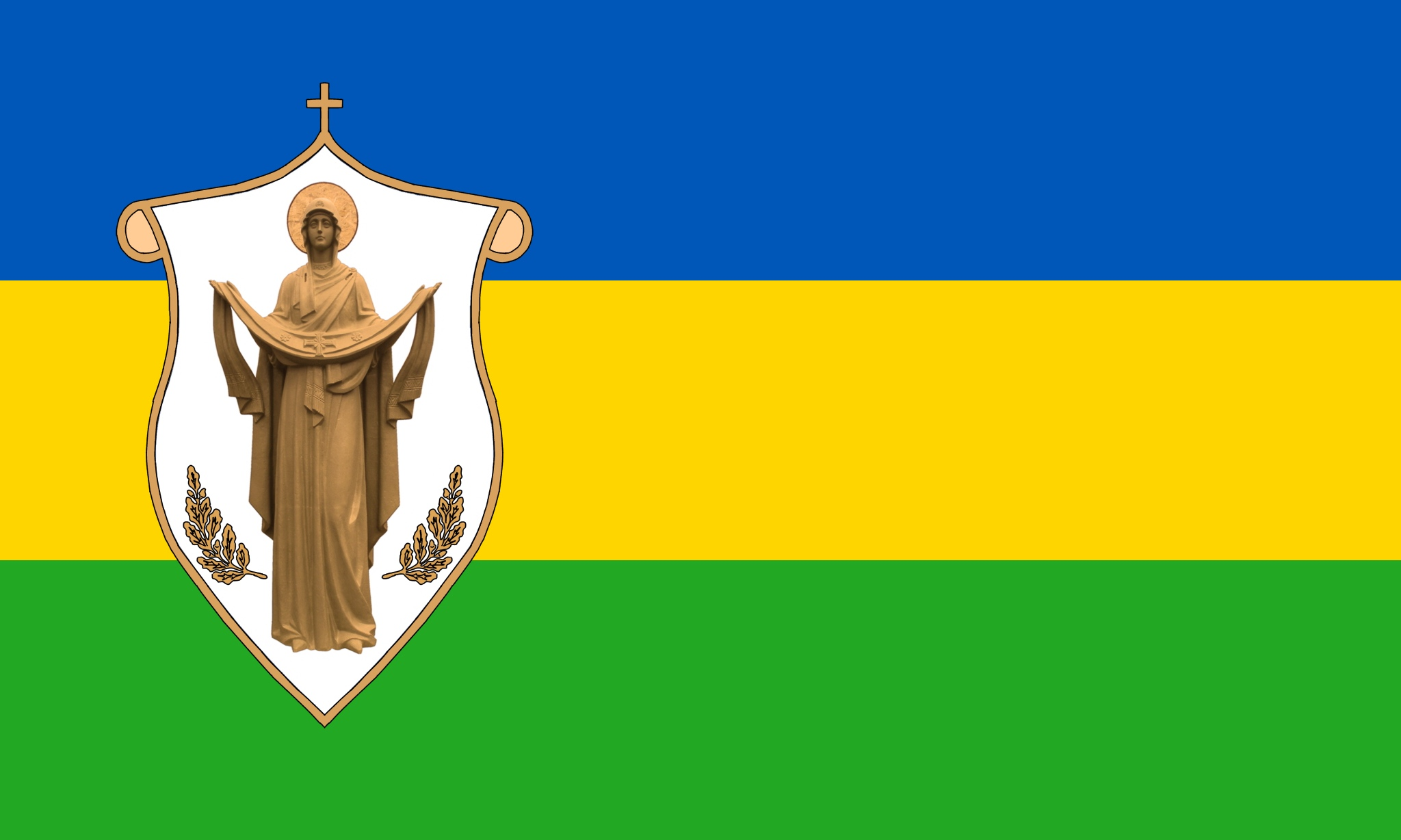
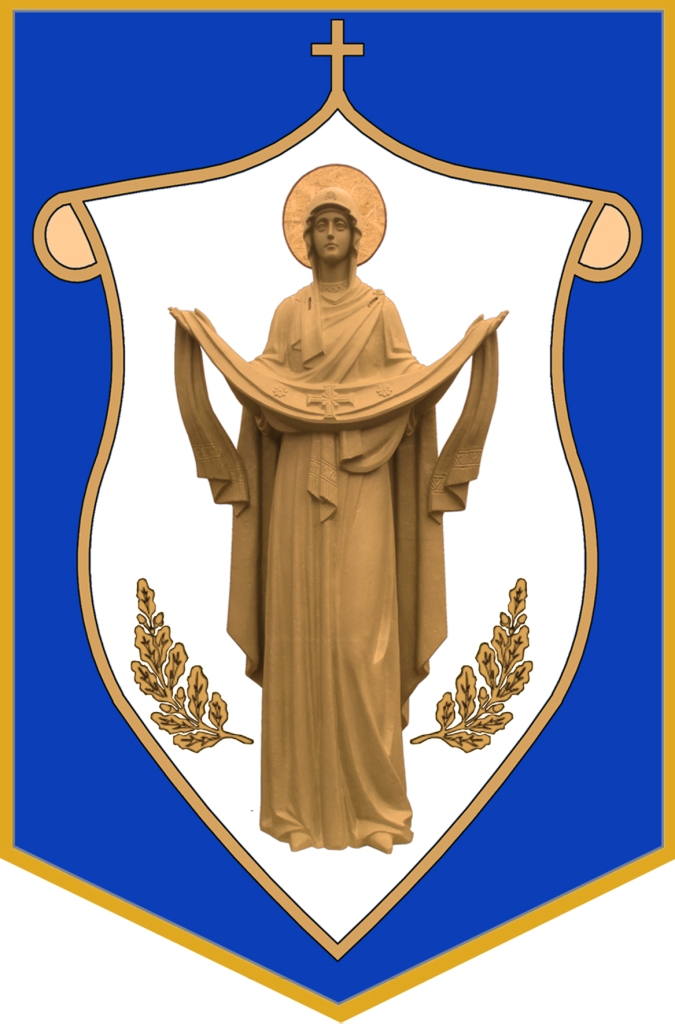
- Flag Coat of arms

- Location of Novi Petrivtsi, Kyiv Oblast Novi Petrivtsi (Ukraine)
- Coordinates: 50.623056°N 30.446389°E
- Country: Ukraine
- Oblast: Kyiv Oblast
- District: Vyshhorod Raion

Area
  - Total: 9.39 km^{2} (3.63 sq mi)

Population
  - Total: 7,700
- Postal code: 07354
- Area code: +380 04596

Novi Petrivtsi (Ukrainian: Нові Петрівці) is a large village located just north of Kyiv, in Vyshhorod Raion, Kyiv Oblast, Ukraine. Today it is the administrative seat of the Petrivtsi rural hromada, one of the hromadas of Ukraine.

Just outside the village lies the Mezhyhirya Residence, the former private residence of ousted Ukrainian President Viktor Yanukovych and epicenter of a corruption scandal during his time as prime minister. After Yanukovych fled Ukraine in the wake of the Revolution of Dignity, the complex was converted into a museum. Yanukovych was last seen publicly in the village of Novi Petrivsi before he disappeared from Ukraine around 2:00am on 22 February 2014, when local residents heard helicopters take off and saw two armored personnel carriers leave the area.

A water reservoir of the Kyiv Hydro-Accumulating Power Station is located to the south of Novi Petrivtsi. Further south lies the city of Vyshhorod, which is adjacent to Kyiv.

A training facility of the Internal Troops of Ukraine is also located near the village. It is currently being used to train new recruits for the National Guard of Ukraine.

On March 16, 2022 an apartment in Novi Petrivtsi was hit by a Russian airstrike, causing the structure to collapse. A two-year old boy was trapped under the debris and died soon after being rescued.

== Notable people ==
- Serhiy Starenkyi (born 1984), footballer who played for Desna Chernihiv, Oleksandriya, Lviv and Arsenal Kyiv.
- Viktor Yanukovych (born 1950), former President of Ukraine. Was a resident of the village from 2002 until he fled to Russia in the aftermath of the Revolution of Dignity.
