= Yuriy Prylypko =

Ukrainian politician (1960–2022)

- Юрій Прилипко

Mayor of Hostomel
- In office 25 October 2015 – 7 March 2022

Personal details
- Born: 11 August 1960 Hostomel, Ukrainian SSR, Soviet Union (now Ukraine)
- Died: 7 March 2022 (aged 61) Hostomel, Ukraine
- Education: University of Marxism-Leninism

Yuriy Illich Prylypko (Ukrainian: Юрій Ілліч Прилипко, 11 August 1960 – 7 March 2022) was a Ukrainian politician who served as the mayor of Hostomel from 2015 until his death during the 2022 Russian invasion of Ukraine. He was killed by Russian soldiers on 7 March 2022.

== Biography ==
In 2015, Prylypko was elected as the mayor of Hostomel.

Yuriy Prylypko faced public criticism for helping to hide the car fleet of former President of Ukraine Viktor Yanukovych, who was convicted of treason. Yuriy Prylypko opposed the allocation of land to ATO veterans, which caused a conflict with them.

During his tenure and the 2022 Russian invasion of Ukraine, President Volodymyr Zelenskyy awarded the title of Hero City on 6 March to six Ukrainian cities and towns that defended themselves against invading Russian soldiers, including Hostomel.

Prylypko was shot and killed by occupying Russian soldiers on 7 March, along with several other volunteers, while delivering food and medicine in the city. His body was reportedly booby trapped by Russian forces. When the local priest came to pick up his body, a sympathetic Russian soldier stopped the priest from getting close, disarmed the trap, and helped load the mayor's body onto a wheelbarrow to be transported away. Prylypko was buried near the local church with honors.

Several European mayors expressed their condolences over his killing, including Enzo Bianco, president of the National Council of Anci and member of the presidency of the committee of European regions, and Esterino Montino, mayor of Fiumicino, Italy.
