= Rokach (river) =

Coordinates: 50°34′N 30°17′E

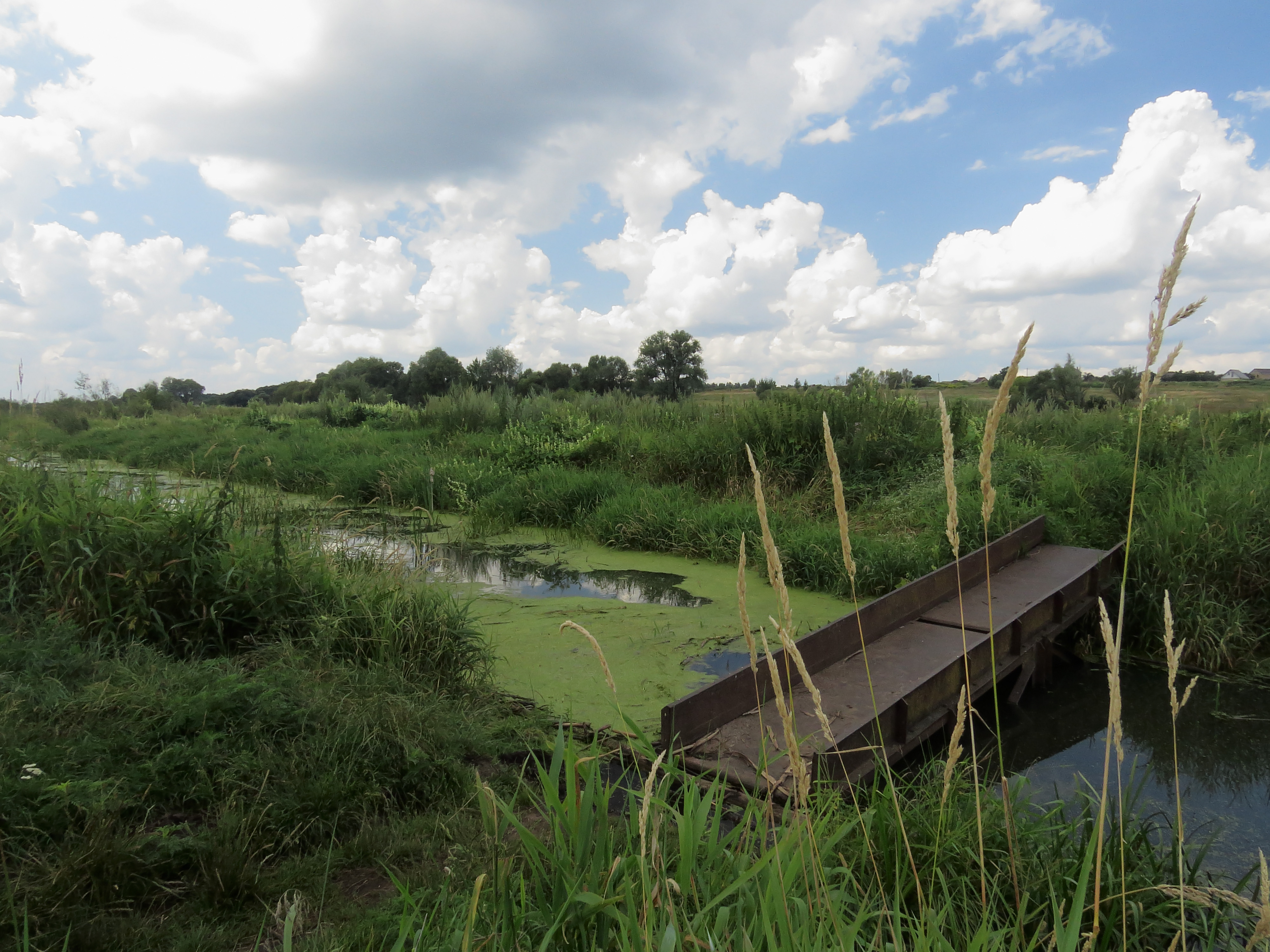
- Rokach River near Bucha
- Native name: Рокач (Ukrainian)

Physical characteristics
- Source: forest near Mykulychi, Bucha Raion, Kyiv Oblast
- Mouth: Irpin River near Hostomel
- Length: 17 km (11 mi)

Basin features
- Progression: Irpin→Dnieper→Dnieper–Bug estuary→Black Sea
- Tributaries
  - right: Topirets

Rokach (Ukrainian: Рокач, IPA: [roˈkɑtʃ]) is a river in Ukraine, a left tributary of the Irpin River. It is located in Bucha Raion of Kyiv Oblast. The river is 17 kilometres long, and has a drainage basin of 160 square kilometres. Rokach River begins in the forest to the north of Mykulychi. It flows through a dam near Myrotske, and due to this a pond is formed. The river continues flowing on the border of Bucha and Hostomel, and then through Hostomel. Rokach flows into Irpin River around 1 kilometre east of Hostomel.

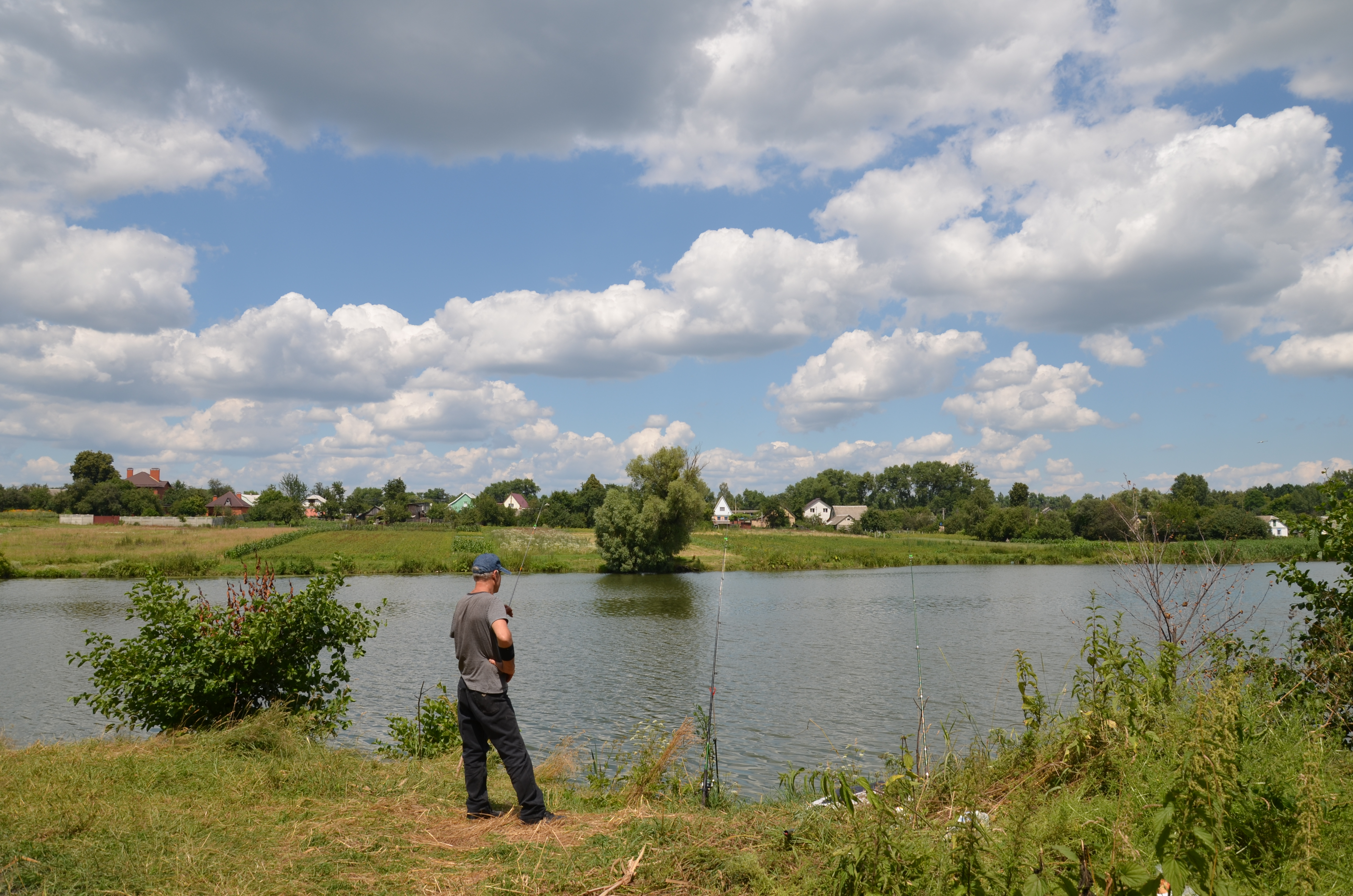
pond near Myrotske

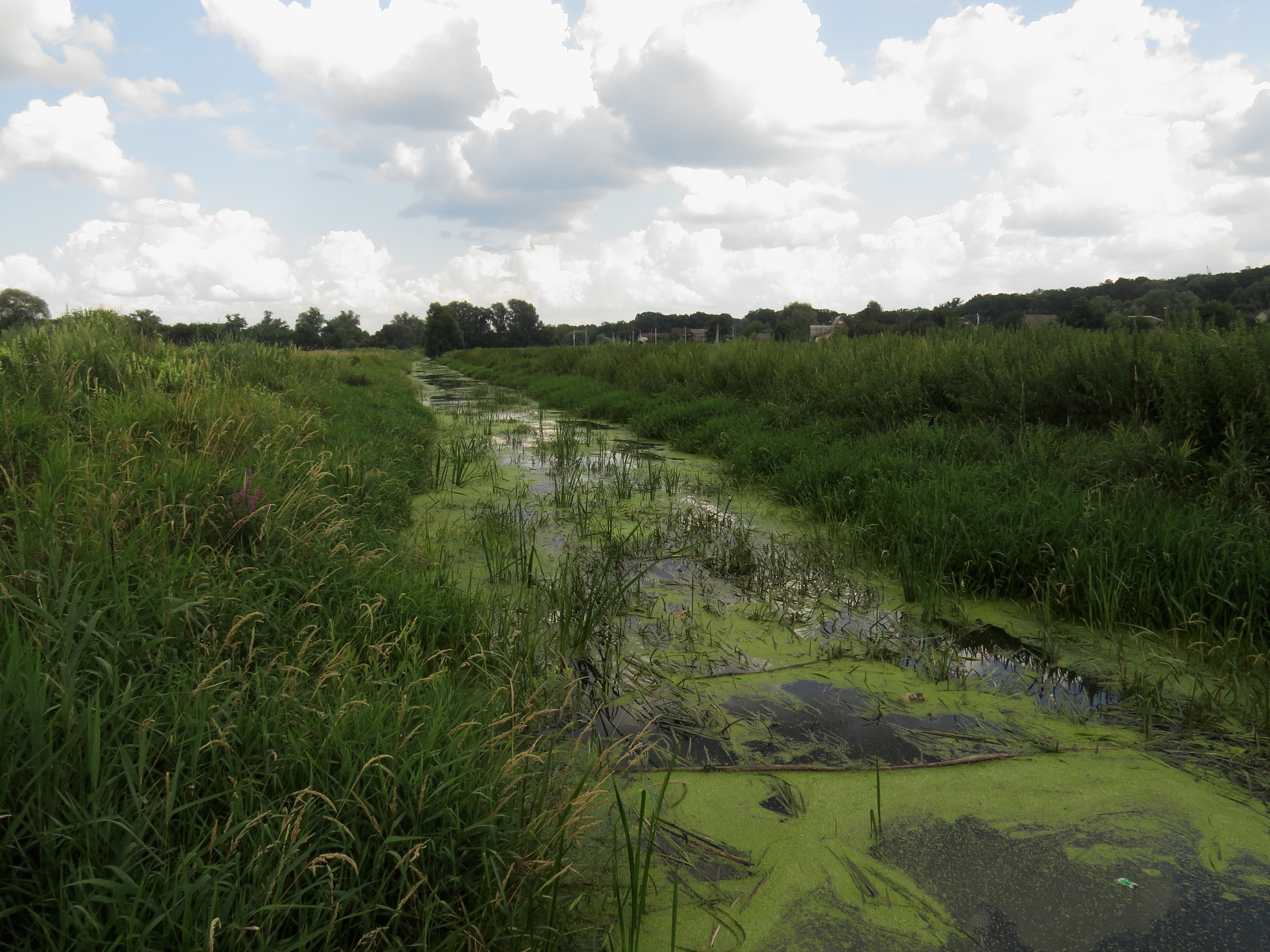
near Bucha

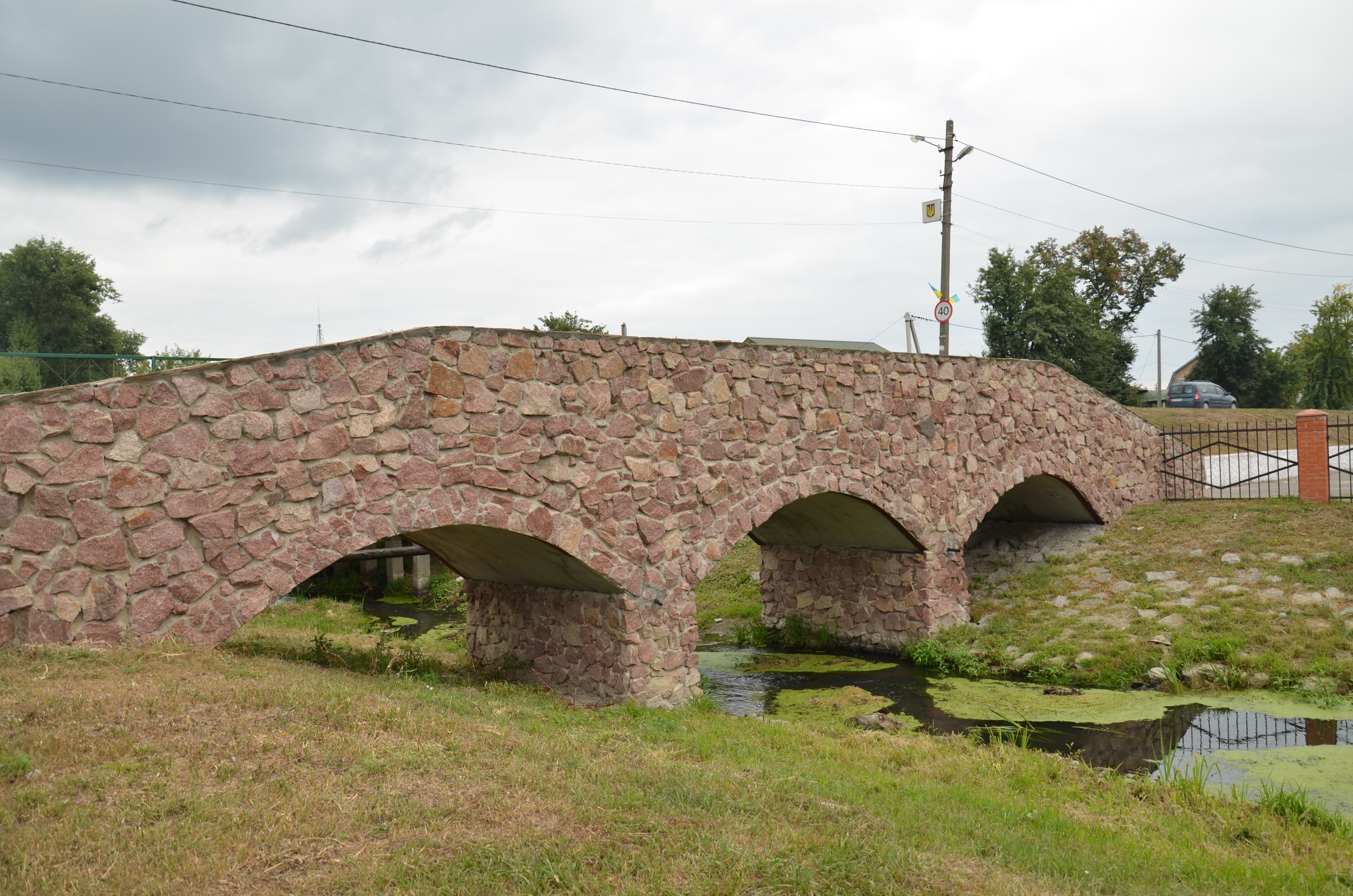
in Hostomel

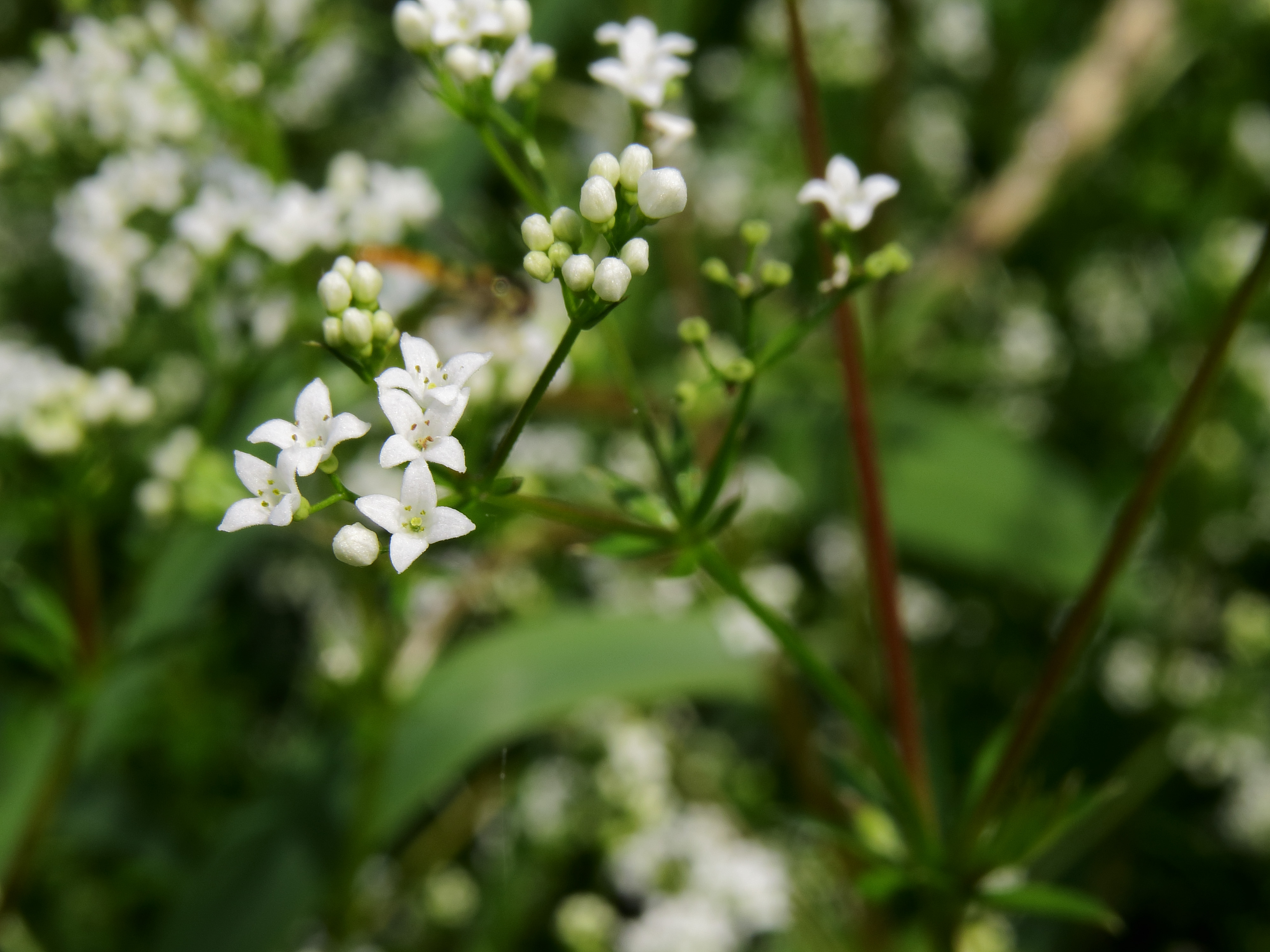
Galium uliginosum near Rokach River
