= Alexander Edelmann =

American pianist and piano teacher (1904–1995)

Alexander Edelmann (Russian: Александр Лазаревич Эйдельман (Эдельман); 7 June 1904, Hostomel, Russian Empire – 31 October 1995, New York, United States), was a Soviet and American pianist and piano teacher.

== Biography ==
Edelmann was born on 7 June 1904 in Hostomel, Russian Empire (modern Ukraine).

In 1923 he completed the Kyiv Conservatory, studying under Heinrich Neuhaus.

From 1925 he taught at the Kyiv Conservatory.

1943-1950 — professor at the Kyiv Conservatory.

1950-1978 — professor at the Lviv Conservatory.

In 1978 he emigrated from the USSR to the USA. From 1978 he lived in the USA. He worked as a professor at New York University.
