= Irpin Bridge, Hostomel =

Irpin Bridge Мостовий перехід через річку Ірпінь
- Coordinates: 50°33′12″N 30°17′04″E
- Crosses: Irpin
- Locale: Hostomel, Kyiv Oblast, Ukraine

Characteristics
- Total length: 140 m
- Width: 9.5 m
- No. of lanes: 4

Bridge over the Irpin River in Hostomel is a part of Highway M07 (Kyiv – Kovel – Yahodyn). The bridge joins the former village of Mostyshche with the main part of Hostomel near Bucha and Irpin.

== History ==
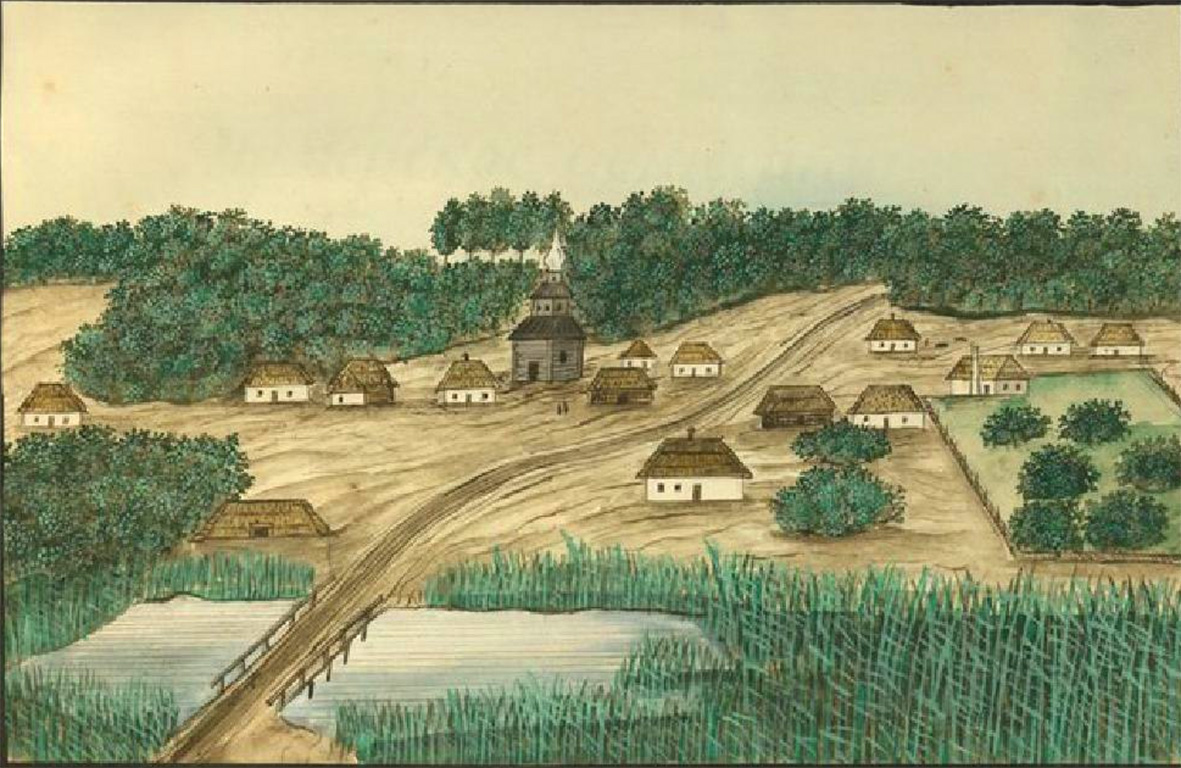
Drawing of Mostyshche with the bridge over the Irpin by Dominique Pierre de la Flise, 1854.

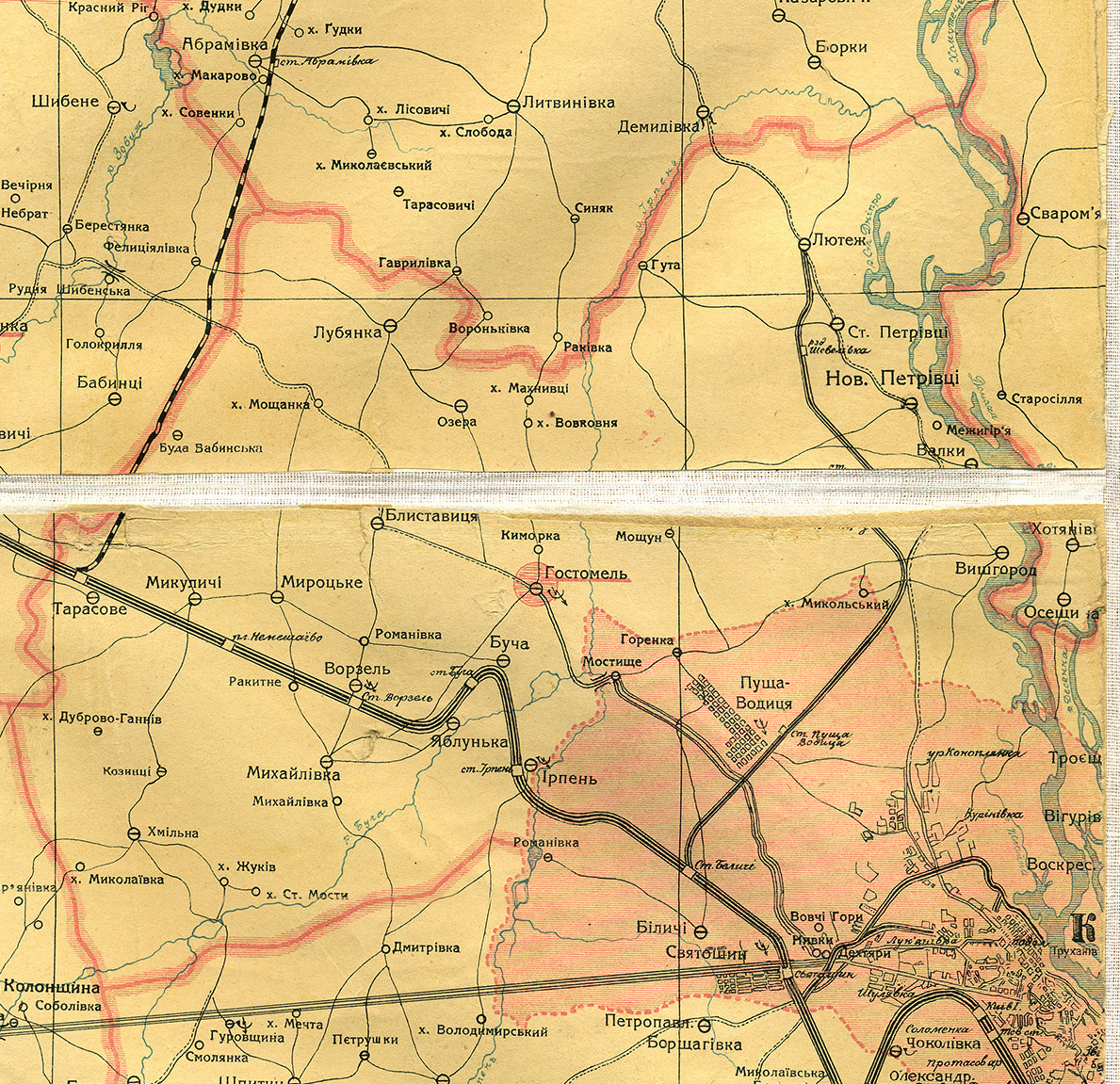
Map of the surroundings of Hostomel from 1925 with the bridge near Mostyshche marked.

A bridge (міст, mist) has existed on this territory since ancient times, which is where the name of Mostyshche comes from.

The previous bridge was built in 1958–1959. Back then, it was 7 meters wide.

In 2010, the bridge underwent major reconstruction. It was opened on 9 September 2010. The bridge overhaul project was developed by the Institute State Enterprise Ukrdiprodor, and the construction works were done by ZAT "MBU-3" from Kyiv.

=== Russian invasion of Ukraine ===
On 25 February 2022, during the Battle of Kyiv, a part of the larger Russian invasion of Ukraine, the mayor of Irpin Oleksandr Markushyn reported that three bridges over the Irpin River were blown up (on the Irpin Road, in Hostomel, and in Demydiv).

The traffic on the bridge was partially restored on 18 January 2024, and restored in full capacity on 7 February 2024.

== Technical specifications ==
The new bridge is 140 meters long, and the main parameters of the bridge meet the requirements of a first category highway.

The bridge's width is 9.5 meters. As the bridge is located on the territory of a populated place, it has a sidewalk and streetlights.

During the bridge overhaul, modern, durable structures and materials were used.

The traffic intensity across the bridge is over 25 thousand cars per day.

== Sources ==
- «У Бучі збудовано міст». Вісті Київщини, № 18, September 2010, p. 4
