= Hostomel =

Rural locality in Kyiv Oblast, Ukraine

Hostomel Гостомель
- Rural settlement
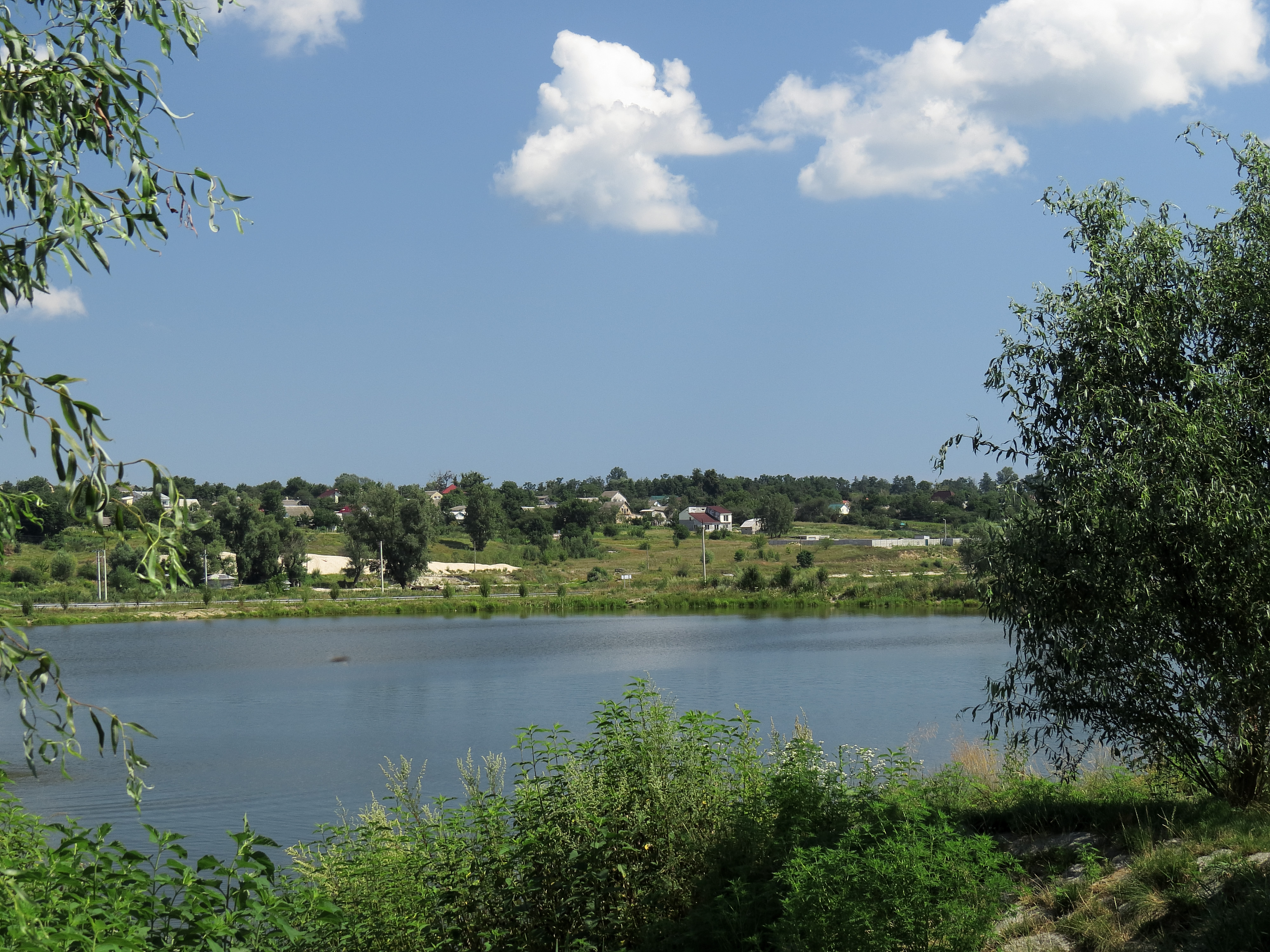

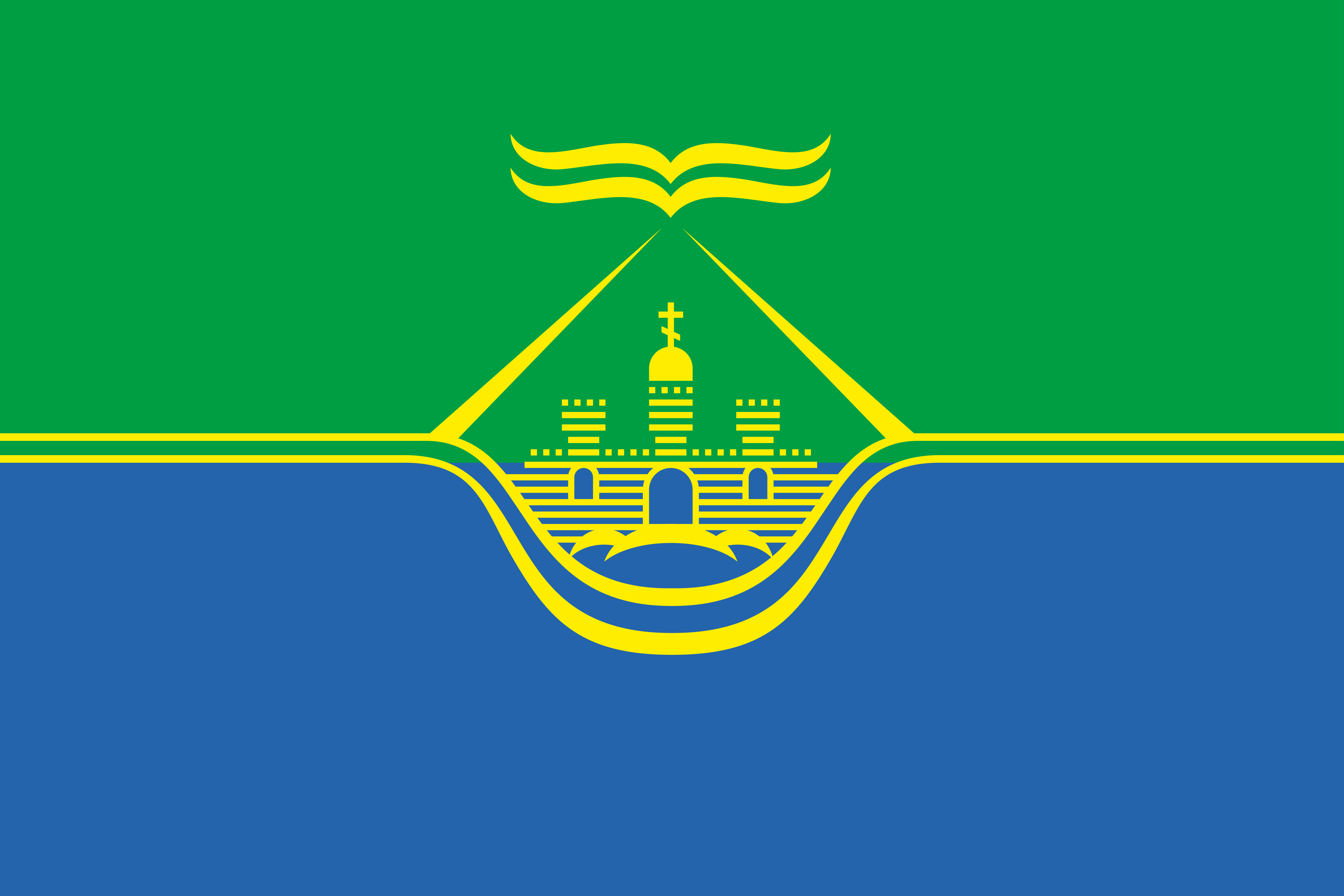
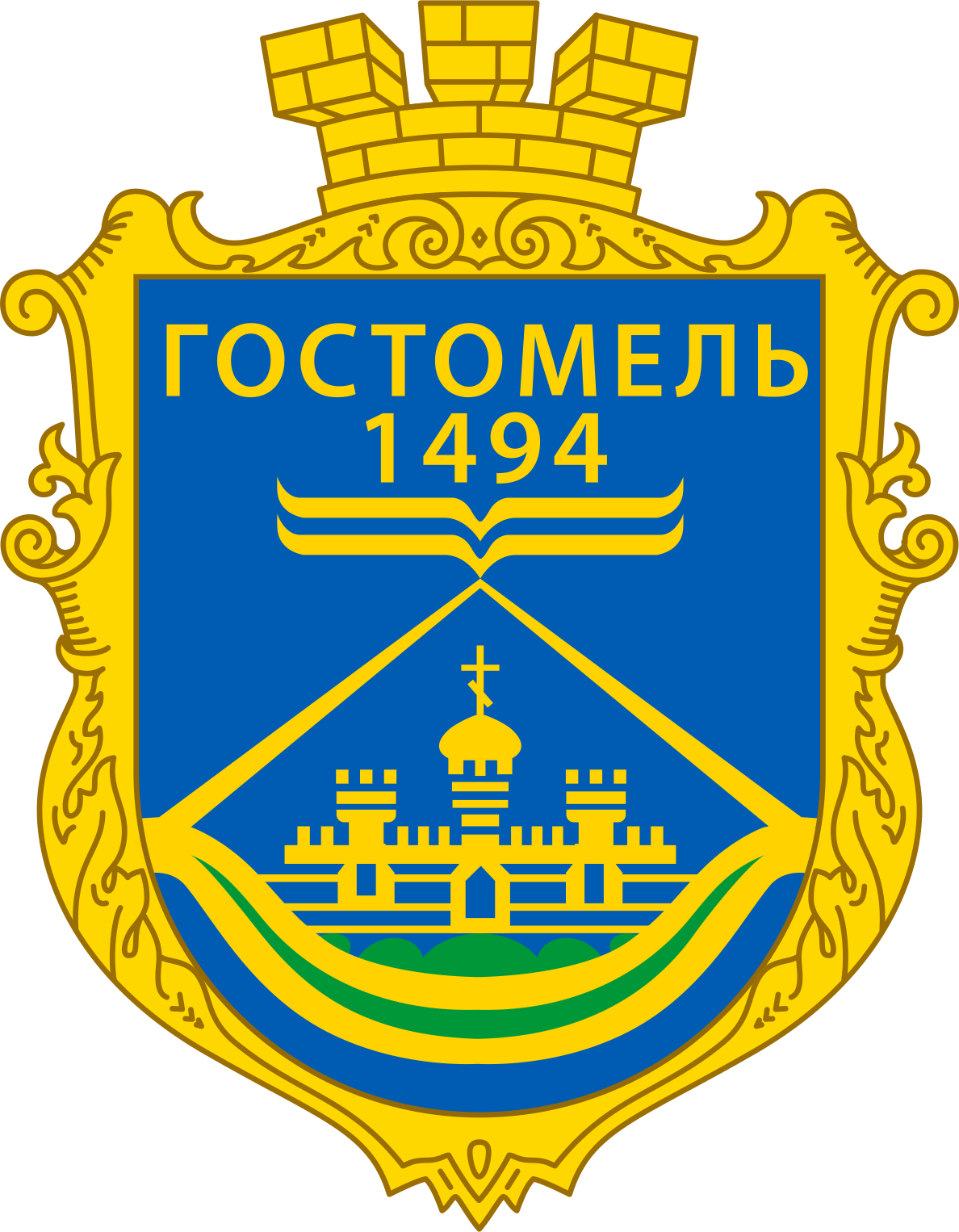
- Flag Coat of arms

- Location within Kyiv Oblast Location within Ukraine
- Coordinates: 50°34′09″N 30°15′55″E
- Country: Ukraine
- Oblast: Kyiv Oblast
- Raion: Bucha Raion
- Hromada: Hostomel settlement hromada
- First written mention: 1494
- Magdeburg rights: 1614

Government
  - Body: Hostomel settlement council

Area
  - Land: 38 km^{2} (15 sq mi)

Population (2022)
  - Total: 18,466

Hostomel (Ukrainian: Гостомель, IPA: [ɦoˈstɔmelʲ]) is a rural settlement in Bucha Raion, Kyiv Oblast, Ukraine. It is located northwest of the capital Kyiv. It hosts the administration of Hostomel settlement hromada, one of the hromadas of Ukraine. Population: 18,466 (2022 estimate).

The town is mainly known for Hostomel Airport, also known as Antonov Airport, a major international cargo facility. There is also a Vetropack glass factory in Hostomel.

Hostomel was attacked during the Russian invasion of Ukraine in 2022, with its mayor Yuriy Prylypko among those killed. The town was given the title Hero City of Ukraine on 13 March. On 2 April, Ukrainian authorities confirmed that they had retaken control over most of Kyiv Oblast.

== Overview ==
To the west of Hostomel are the cities of Bucha and Irpin, and the village of Blystavytsia; to the east are Horenka village and the Irpin River; to the southeast is a pine forest, which is a part of the Holosiiv National Nature Park.

The neighborhoods of Hostomel include Balanivka (former khutir), Kimerka (former khutir), Mostyshche (formerly a separate village separated by a bridge) and the military town.

The two main roads of the town are Sviato-Pokrovska Street (lit. 'Holy Intercession Street') and Yarova Street (lit. 'Ravine Street'), which were formerly known as Lenina Street (lit. 'Vladimir Lenin Street') and Chervonoarmiiska Street (lit. 'Red Army Street') before the decommunization laws were enacted.

== History ==
According to legends, Hostomel has existed since ancient times and was called Ostromyr. But, the first written mention of it dates back to 1494.

In 1495, the Grand Duke of Lithuania Alexander gave Hostomel to Prince Ivan Dashkevych Lvovich Hlynsky. In 1509, after the betrayal of the Hlynski to the Muscovites, the estate of king Sigismund I was given to Semen Poloz.

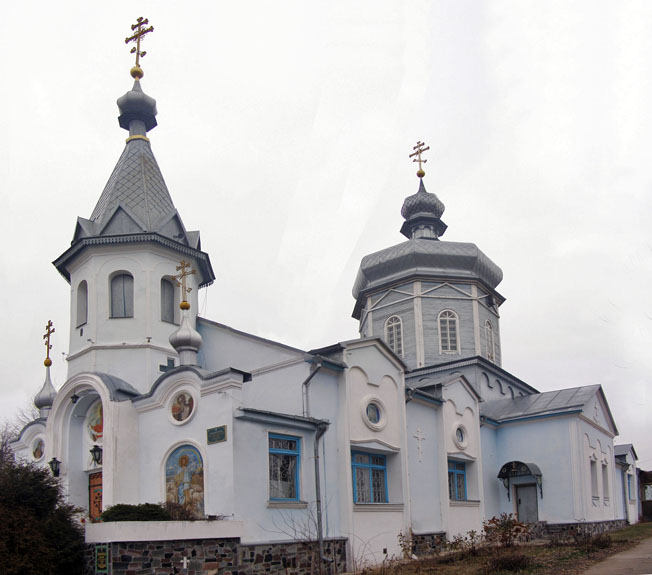
Church of Intercession

In 1614, King Sigismund III of Poland granted Hostomel the Magdeburg right. The village of Hostomel received city rights with the assistance of the owner – Stanislav Kharlensky, the son of Kyiv Chamberlain Felix.

During the national liberation war under the leadership of Bohdan Khmelnytsky, it became the Cossack hundredth town of the Kyiv regiment.

In 1654, the town was captured by Muscovy.

In 1694, a church was built here.

In July 1768, Ivan Bondarenko's haydamaks visited the town.

Around 1850, Dominique Pierre de la Flise visited Mostyshche.

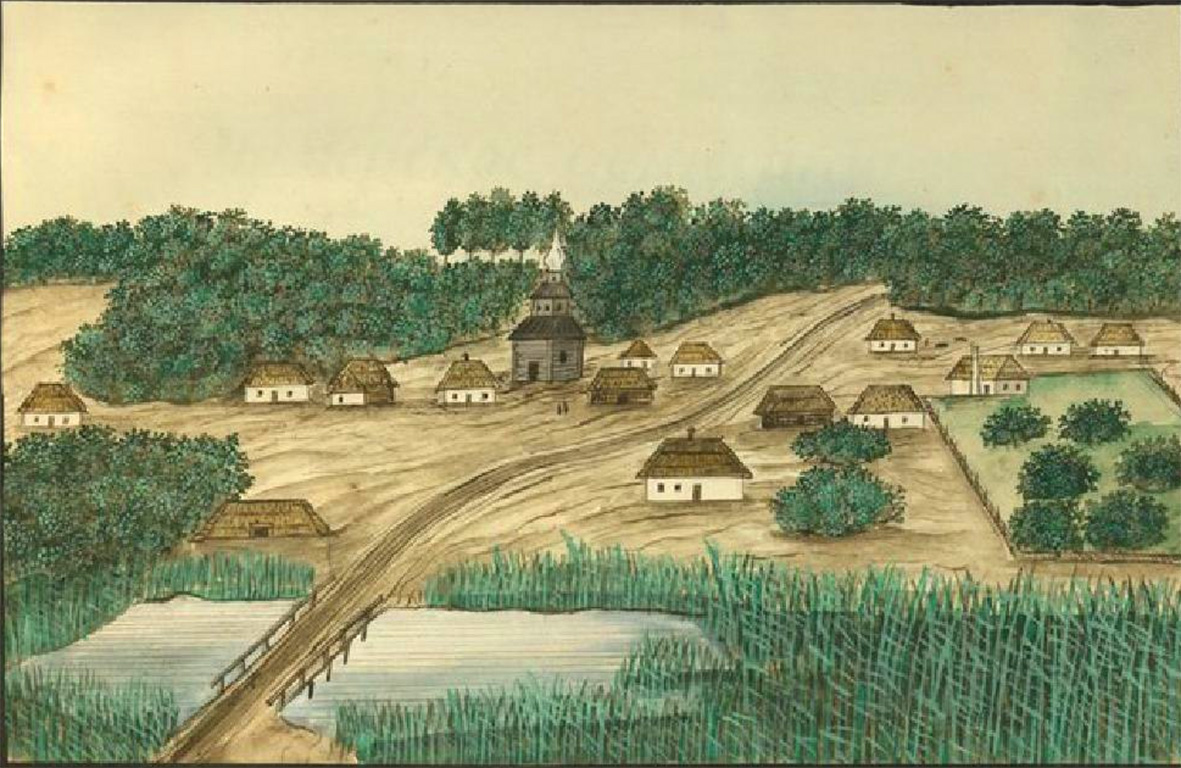
Dominique Pierre de la Flise's drawing of Mostyshche

In 1866 Hostomel became a township center, actively developing. It witnessed many historical events related to the past of Ukraine.

In 1962, Hostomel and other settlements were subordinated to Irpin (it was granted the status of a city of regional significance). In 1972, the village of Mostyshche became a part of Hostomel.

Until 18 July 2020, Hostomel belonged to Irpin Municipality. In July 2020, as part of the administrative reform of Ukraine, which reduced the number of raions of Kyiv Oblast to seven, Irpin Municipality was merged into Bucha Raion.

=== 2022 Russian invasion ===
On 24 February 2022, the first day of the 2022 Russian invasion of Ukraine, Hostomel and the Hostomel Airport were attacked by the Russian military in an attempt to capture the town. Ukrainian President Volodymyr Zelenskyy said that "a Russian airborne force in Hostomel airport outside Kyiv, which has a big runway, has been stopped and is being destroyed." On 24 February the Ukrainian military chief, Valerii Zaluzhnyi, said "a battle is raging in Hostomel". The Antonov 225 plane (Mriya), the world's biggest cargo plane, was destroyed when the hangar it was in was ravaged by the Russians forces, presumably through shelling and artillery.

In the following week the Russians started to use Hostomel as a forward operating base to attack Kyiv, the troops sent to Kyiv met Ukrainian forces in Bucha and Irpin, multiple Russian units were destroyed by artillery and Bayraktar drone strikes, Ukrainian forces also pushed the frontline back into Hostomel, with Ukrainian Special Forces launching raids against Kadyrovtsy on 27 February, and VDV mechanized units along the week.

On 7 March 2022, Russian troops killed mayor Yuriy Prylypko while he was delivering food and medicines in the city.

Ukrainian counteroffensives were unable to fully retake the town, however a major Russian withdrawal from Kyiv Oblast in late March and early April saw the town completely retaken from Russian forces.

On April 6, the head of the Hostomel settlement military administration, Taras Dumenko, reported that four hundred people had gone missing in 35 days of Russian occupation of Hostomel.

On 20 November 2022, Verkhovna Rada approved the project of promoting Hostomel's status from urban-type settlement to city. On 20 October 2023, President Volodymyr Zelenskyy signed a law that abolished urban-type settlement status, according to which Hostomel became a rural settlement. This law has come into effect on 26 January 2024, three months after it was signed.

== Population ==
=== Language ===
Distribution of the population by native language according to the 2001 census:

Language	Percentage
Ukrainian	90.3%
Russian	9%
other/undecided	0.7%

== Establishments ==
In the field of education, there are four schools: two of them are general and two primary, a preschool No. 17 "Rainbow", the Center for Children and Youth Creativity.

There are four football teams: "Fakel," "Kimerka," "Phoenix," and "Mriya," and the former three competed in 2022 in the Hostomel Open Cup.

Prior to the Russian invasion, the town had a number of large establishments that are well known not only in Ukraine but also abroad – in particular, the state enterprise "Antonov" (about 1320 employees) and OJSC "Hostomel Glass Factory" (about 800 employees). They are the largest taxpayers to the budget.

Medium and small businesses were also developing. Things were going well at other establishments of the town: JSC "ATP-13250" (about 125 employees) – passenger traffic; firm "ATAD & K" – manufacture of wood products; Kyiv starch processing factory, and others. There are also establishments in Hostomel that are directly involved in agriculture. These are STOV "Buchanske", "Renault", "Promin". In addition, there are such establishments of social and household sphere, such as hotel "Korchma", two hairdressing salons, studio of repair of TV sets, and three post offices.

Near the town there was a test site for rail electric transport "Kapway", but the project was abandoned, and in 2021, the "Kapway" car was transferred to the State Aviation Museum of Ukraine. The third airport of Kyiv – the Hostomel International Airport – is located near the town. It is used primarily for cargo, and it was heavily damaged by the Russians.

On 24 December 2019, a water purification and deironing station was opened in Hostomel, which will purify 1,200 cubic meters of water during the day and provide it to the military town.

== Notable people ==
=== Natives ===
- Fedir Artemenko (1898–1922) – Colonel of the Army of Ukrainian People's Republic, active member of the Resistance Movement.
- Alexander Edelmann (1904–1995) – pianist, teacher.
- Mykhailo Shulha (1897–?) – Ukrainian scientist.
- Vioria (real name Violeta Shumar) – a Ukrainian pop singer.

=== Residents ===
- Nadiya Solodyuk (1911–?) – doctor, pathophysiologist, researcher at the Institute of Clinical Physiology of the USSR Academy of Sciences in the 1940s. During the German-Soviet war, she worked at the Hostomel Hospital and the partisan detachment. Author of a book of memoirs.

== Gallery ==
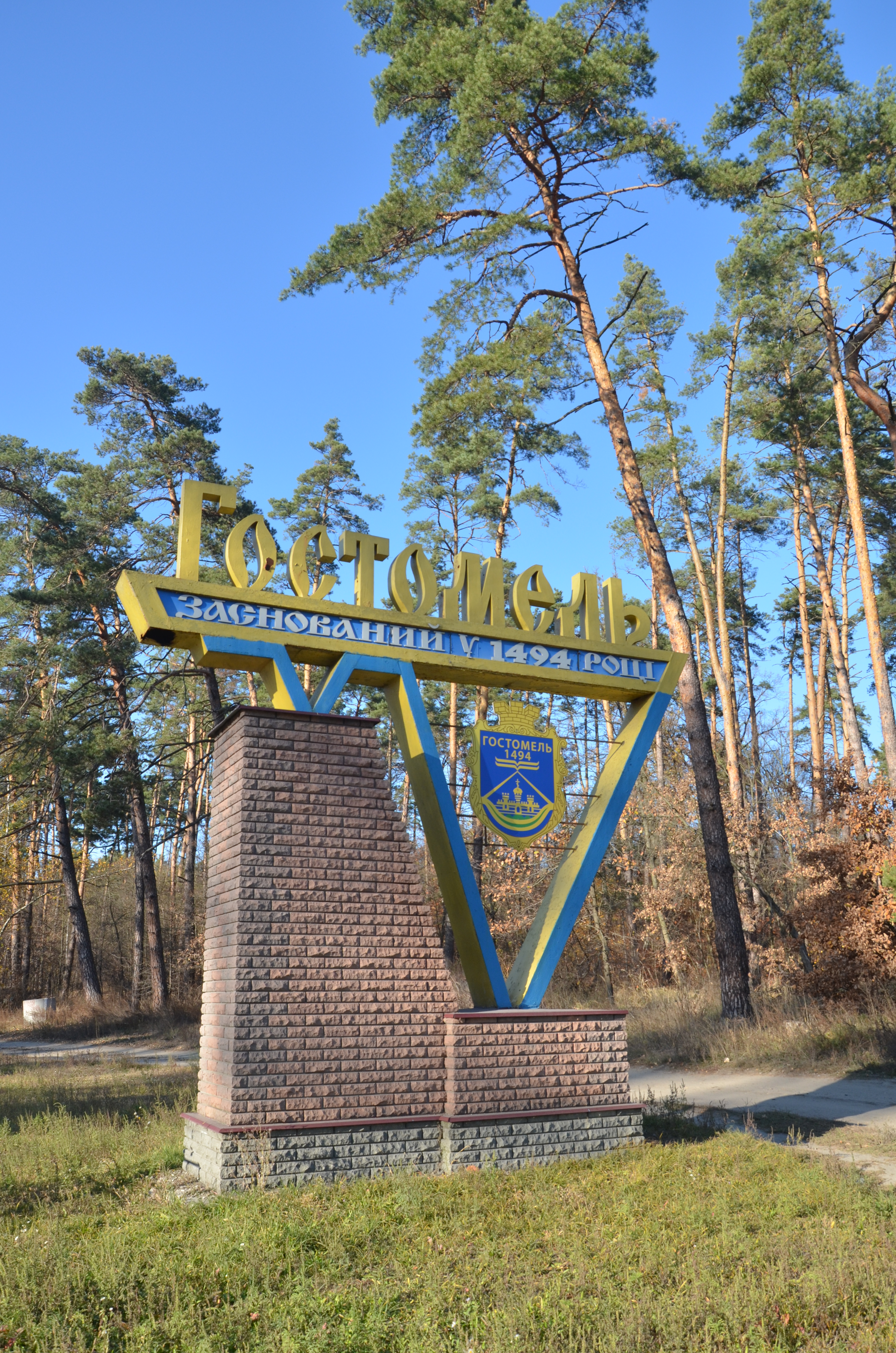
Sign at the entrance of Hostomel

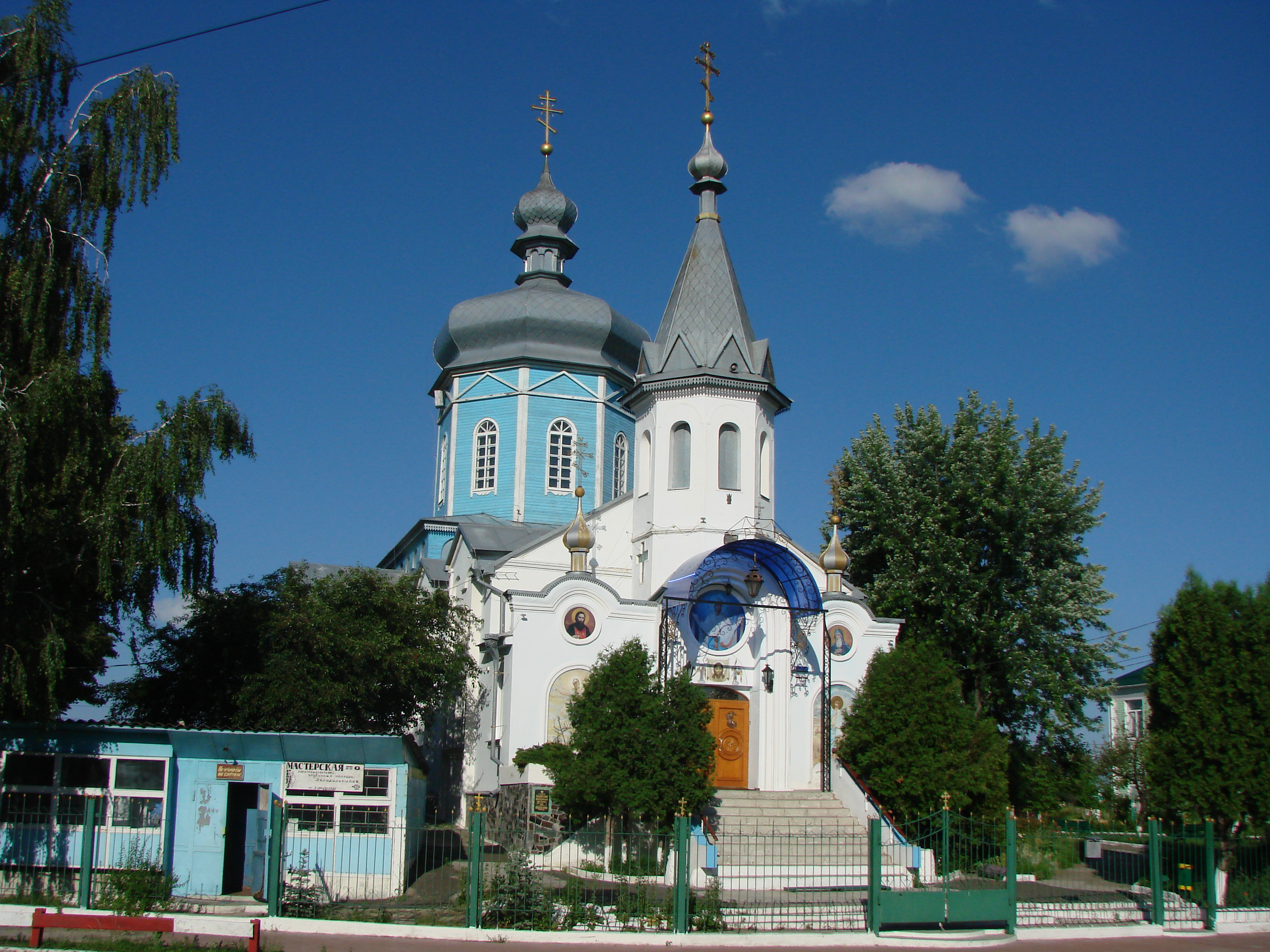
Exterior of the Church of Intercession

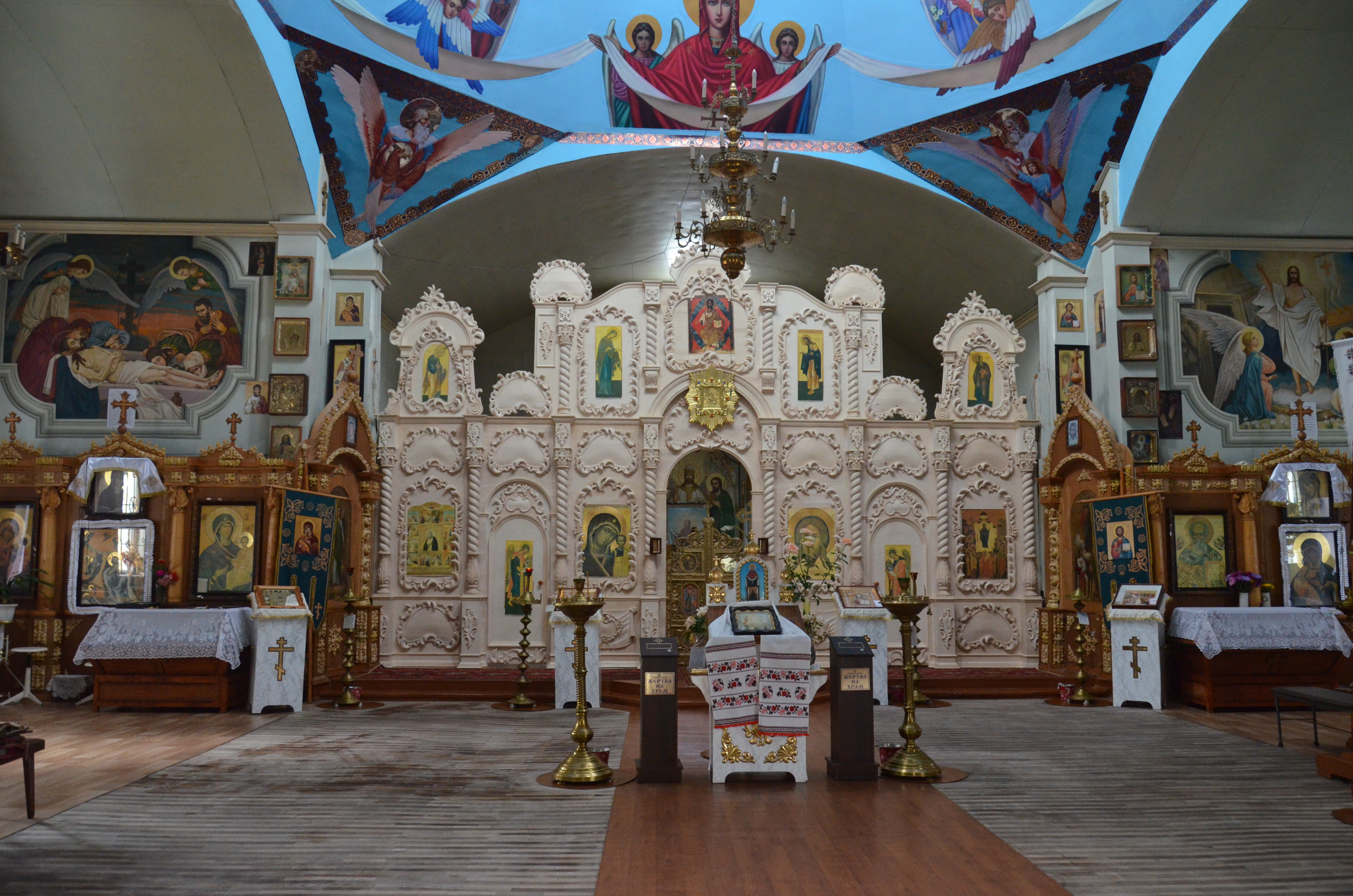
Interior of the Church of Intercession

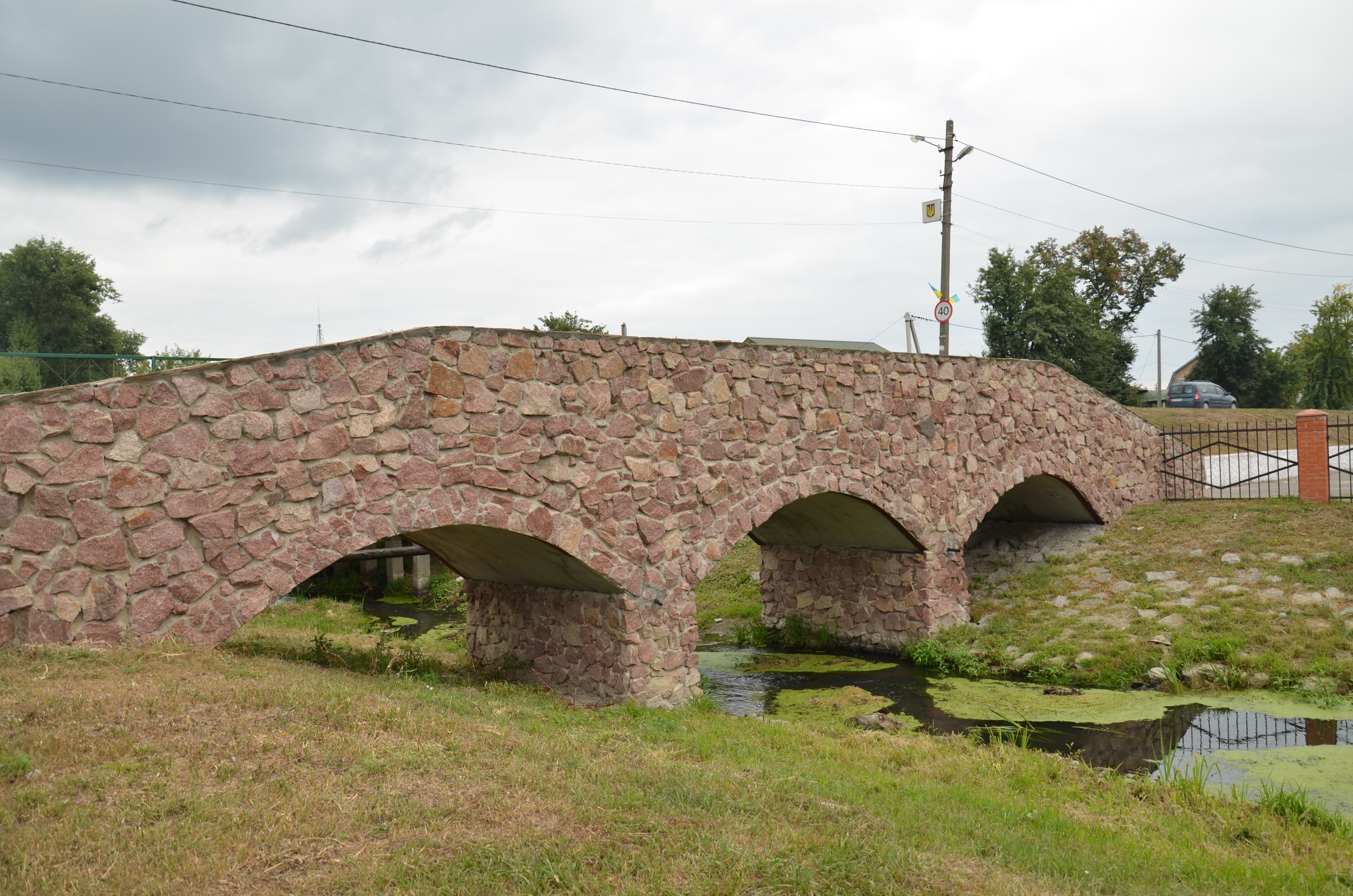
Bridge over Rokach River

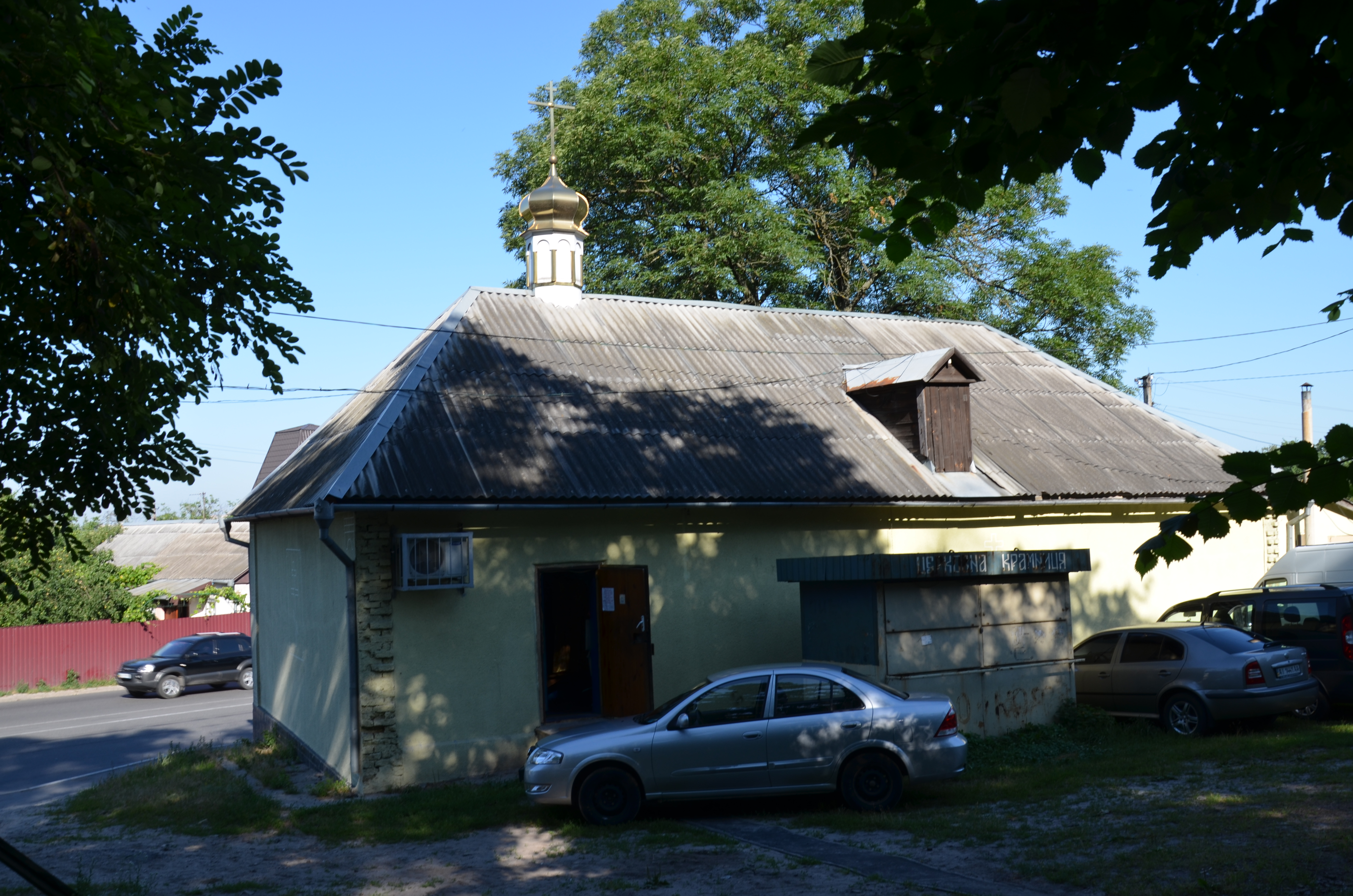
Church of St. Elijah in Mostyshche

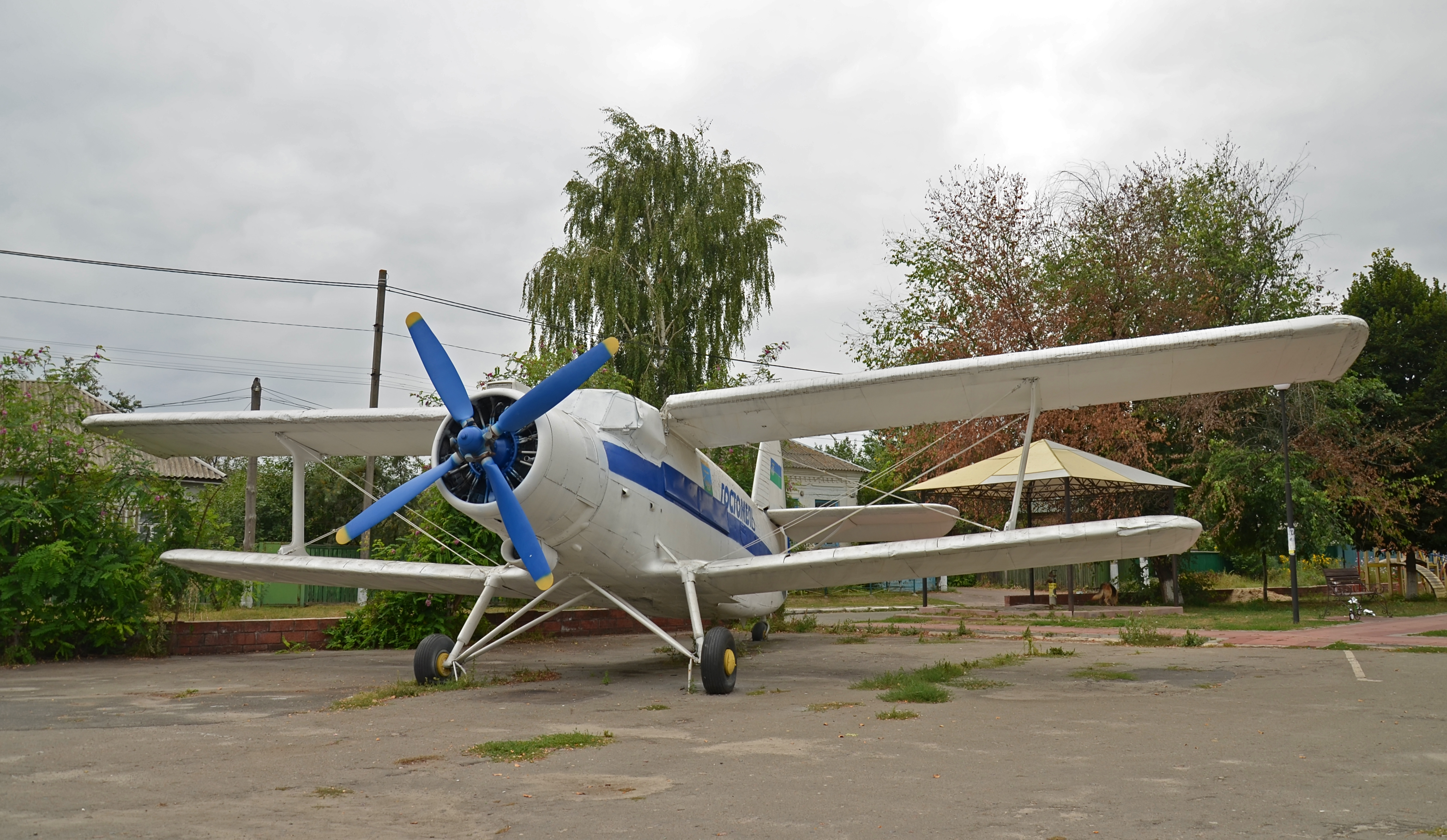
An-2 plane in a park

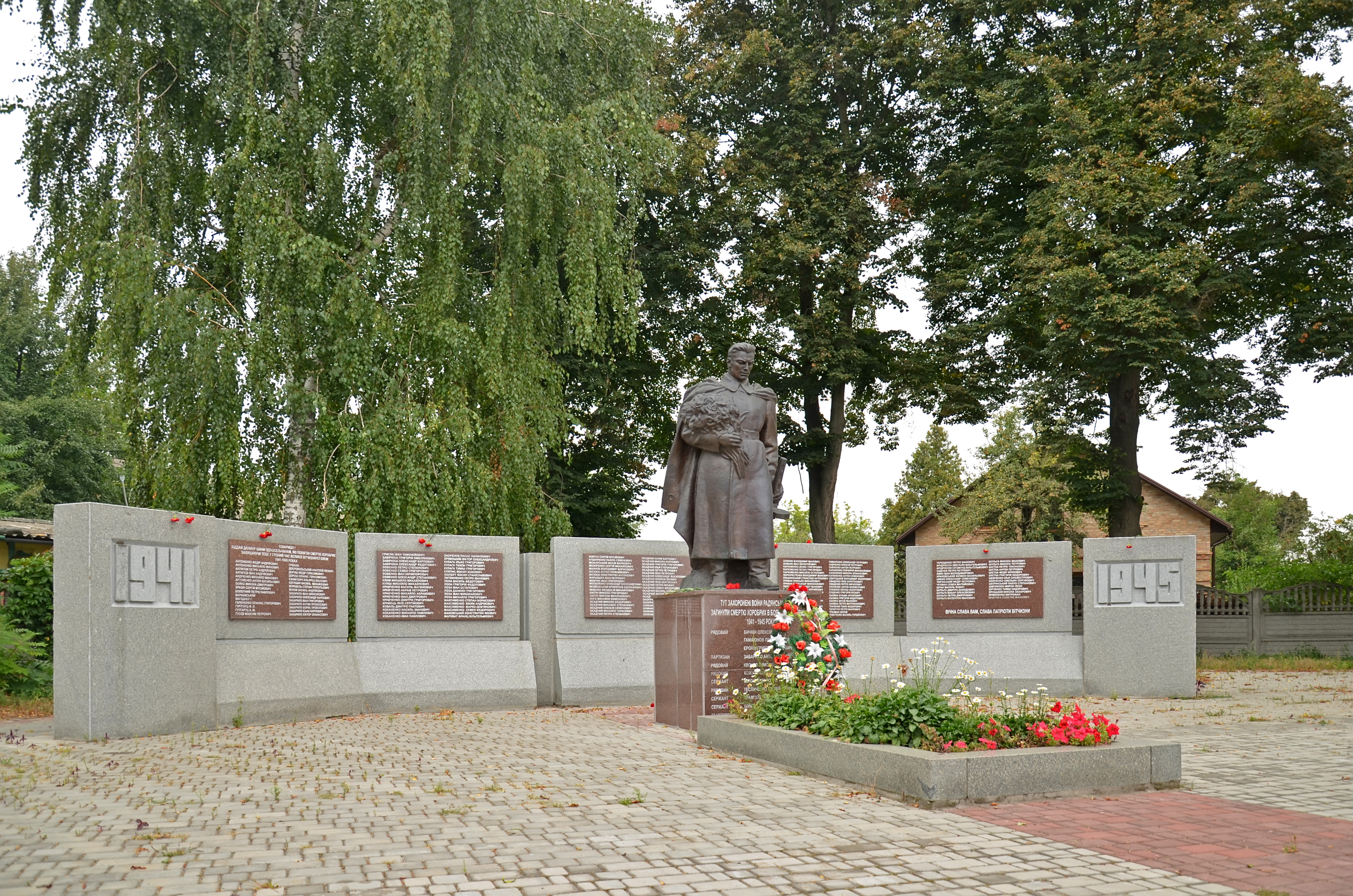
Mass grave of Soviet army soldiers

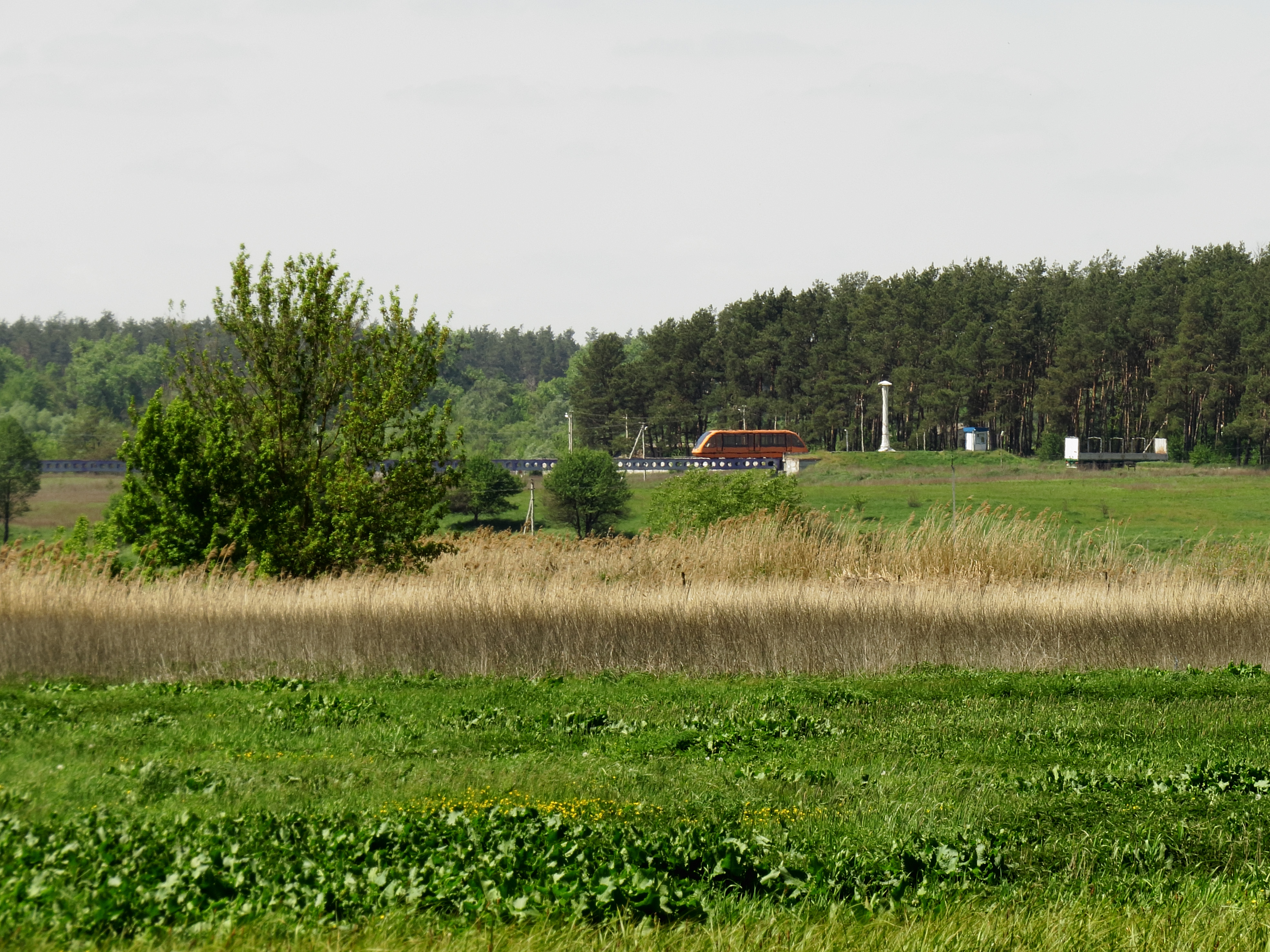
Kapway test site

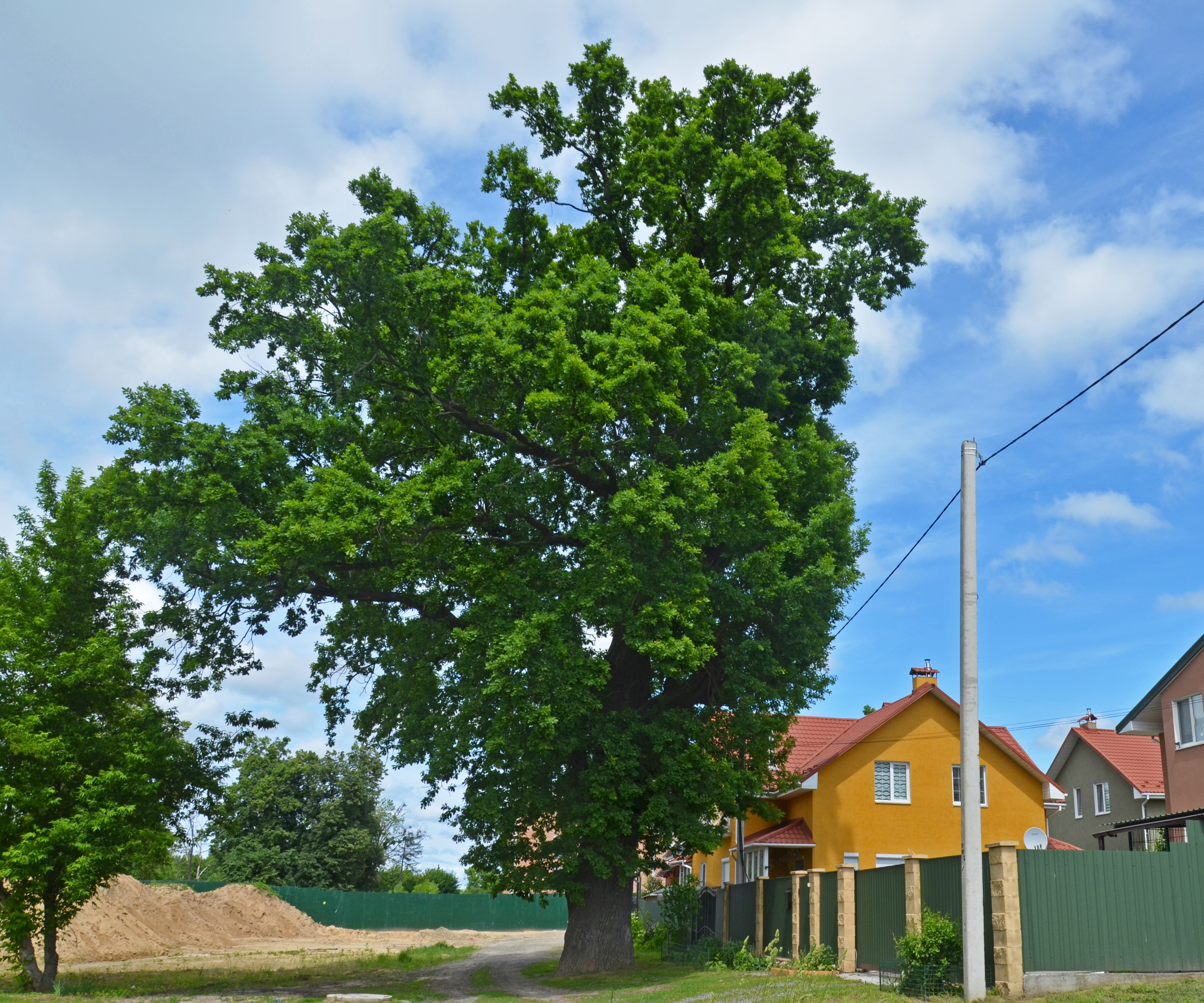
Oak-Amulet

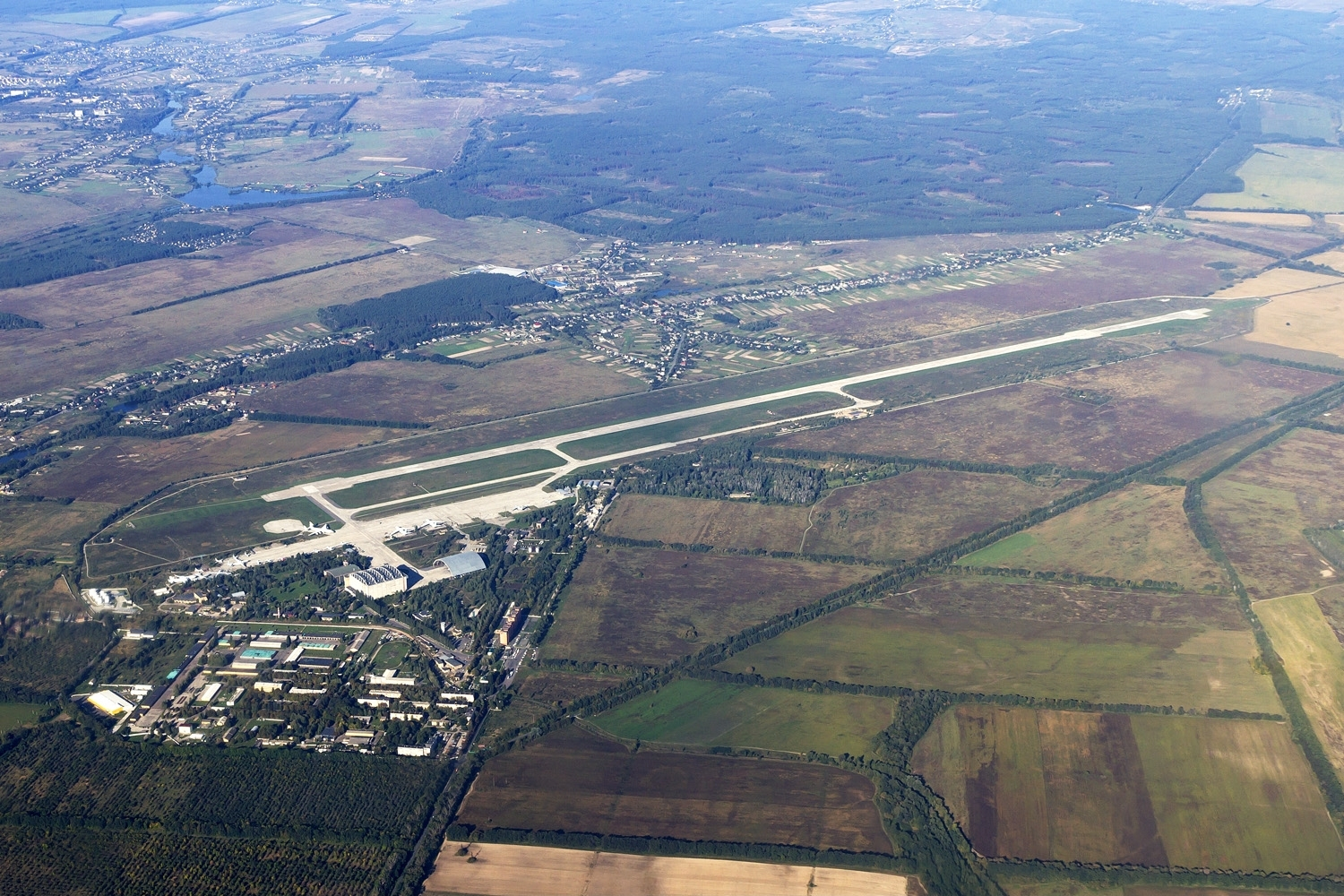
Hostomel Airport

== Twin towns ==
Hostomel is twinned with:

- Řeporyje, Czech Republic
