= Vioria =

vioria
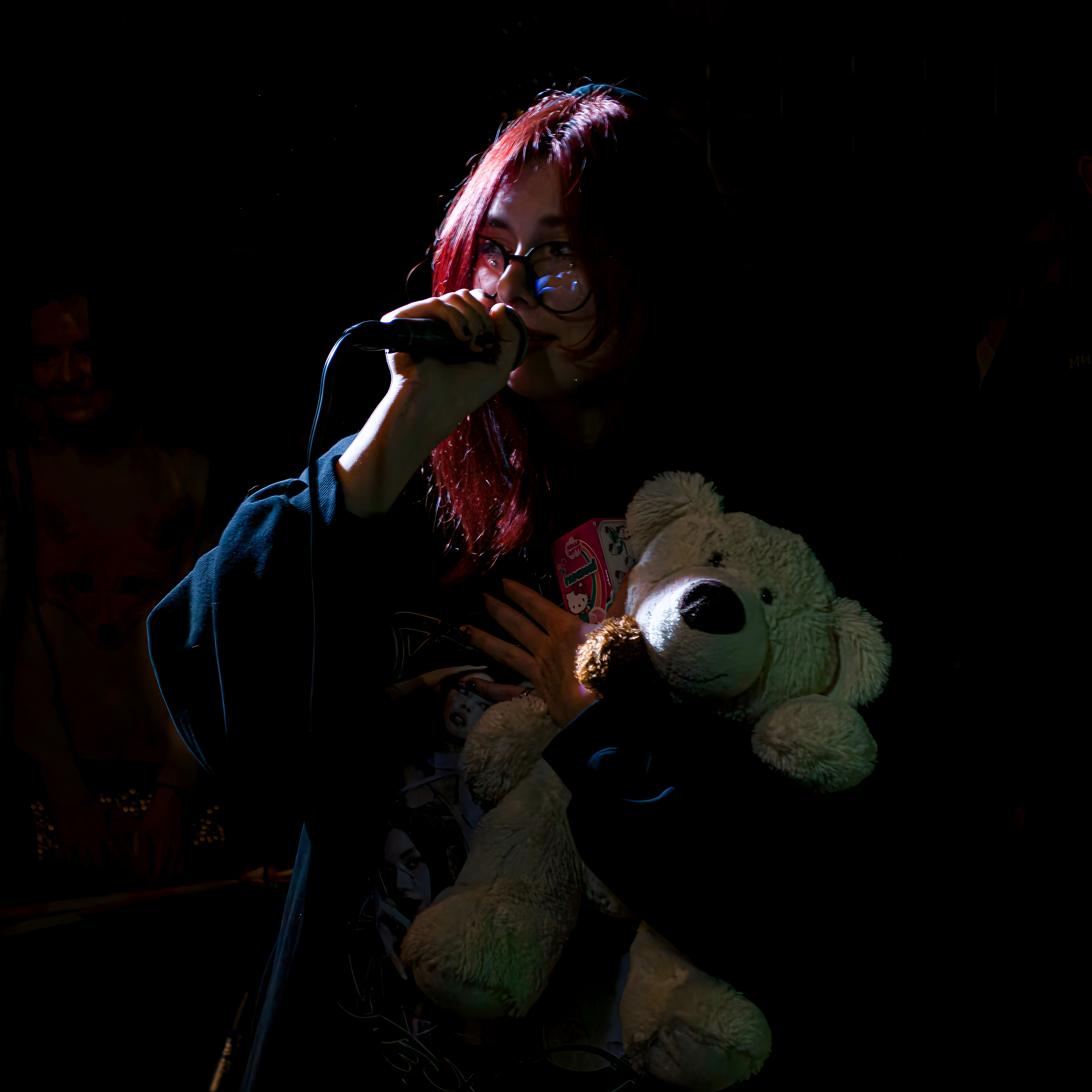
- vioria on a concert in Lviv, 2024

Background information
- Born: Violeta Shumar; Віолета Шумар; May 27, 2004 (age 22); Hostomel, Kyiv Oblast, Ukraine
- Genres: pop-rock
- Years active: 2022–present
- Label: Black Beats

Violeta Shumar (Ukrainian: Віолета Шумар), known professionally as vioria (stylized in all lowercase) is a Ukrainian pop-singer from Hostomel.

vioria is a nickname created from her real first name Violeta. She sings mostly in pop-rock genre.

== Career ==
=== 2022: Ukulele covers and the beginning ===
vioria started her music career with ukulele covers. Her most popular cover was a Ukrainian translation of a Russian song "Ty pokhozh na kota" (Russian: Ты похож на кота, lit. 'You are similar to a cat'), which she released in her Telegram channel in February 2022.

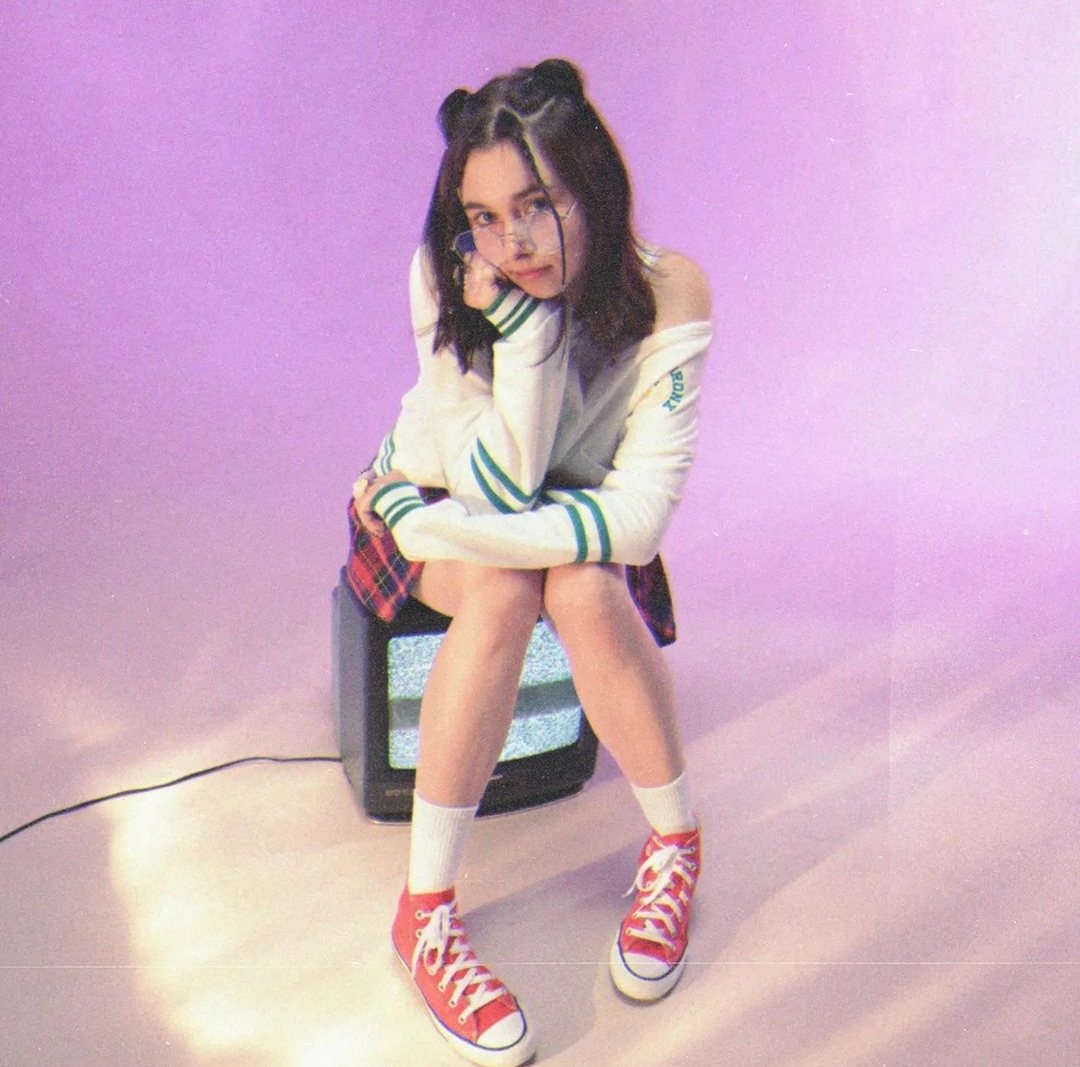
vioria "posered nochi" single cover

After the deoccupation of Kyiv Oblast, vioria started making her own music as she posted a Tik-Tok video with her song "Siohodni Viina" (Ukrainian: Сьогодні війна, lit. 'Today is war'), which attracted attention to her personality. Later, she joined the Black Beats label, and on her 18th birthday on 27 May 2022 released the song "Ya prosto hochu dodomy" (Я просто хочу додому, 'I just want [to come] back home'), in which she sings about homesickness, a theme "familiar to every internally displaced Ukrainian". In August of the following year, vioria released "Khvora na liubov"(Хвора на любов, 'Lovesick').

On September 10, vioria performed on stage for the first time at the Culture of Love festival in Kyiv, then on September 11 performing at the Volume Club, and on September 24 at the Na Chasi event. Subsequently, one of the fans released the first song about her called "Falling in Love with vioria", and in October, the first podcast with vioria was released. On November 4, the song "Hello Kitty" was released, emphasizing her style and admiration for the Japanese character Hello Kitty. On December 10, vioria held her first solo concert in Lviv, where she presented her new mini-album.

=== 2023–present: Kitty-rock and popularity ===
On January 14 vioria performed at a concert in Kyiv. Later, at the Art Club "Teplyi Lampovyi", vioria presented her new song "Tatu", and also performed the Ukrainian version of the hit "I'm Your Drug" together with the Ukrainian singer Raichu, the song "Sidivy" together with the singer Structura Shchastia (Liza Uglach), and other songs.

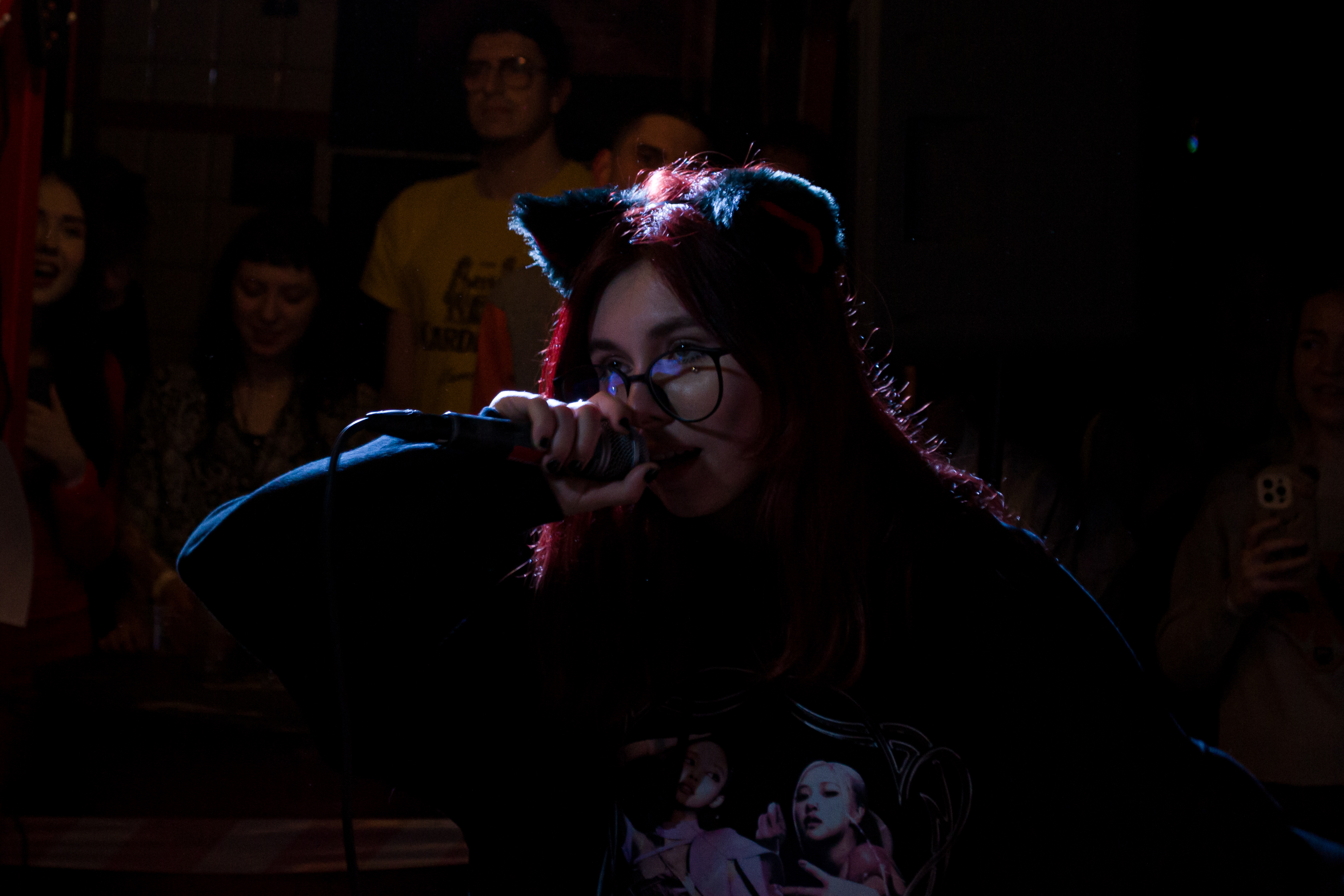
vioria on a concert in Lviv wearing cat ears, February 2024

At midnight on 7 February 2023, she released "tatu" (Тату, 'Tatoo') with singer Odyn den' potomu (Один день потому, 'One day later'), and on April 28, Violeta released the single "Tyanochka" (Тяночка, 'Chick'). On May 26, vioria released "Shkola liubovi" (Школа любові, 'School of love') again with Raichu (Райчу), and in June she announced her second mini-album Uroky Flirtu (Уроки флірту, 'Flirting lessons'), which was released on June 30. It includes the already released song "Shkola liubovi", as well as 5 new tracks, namely: "lyal'kovod" (Ляльковод, 'Pupeteer'), "V chomu ya vynna" (В чому я винна?, 'What am I guilty of?'), "Kotyk" (Котик, '[Cute] Cat'), "Popelom" (Попелом, 'With ashes') and "Znovy pryidu" (Знову приїду, '[I] will come again').

At the end of July, vioria went on a tour of 22 cities in Ukraine along with the Summer Anime & K-pop Fest, where she performed in front of an audience of over 1,500 people as part of the festival in Lviv. During the tour vioria also released her new single "Na tsiomu vse"(На цьому все, 'That's it').

In October, vioria released the song "Metelyky" (Метелики, 'Butterflies'), and in November she performed abroad for the first time at the Bazar in Warsaw.

On 23 August 2024, vioria released her debut album "Kistky" (Кістки, 'Bones').

== Artistry ==
=== Musical style ===
vioria sings mostly in pop-rock style. She claims to be a founder of a new genre of music called kitty-rock. According to vioria, it means a "soft sound of rock about teenage things like first love, first obsession, relationships with friends, and teenage feelings in general". The name “kitty” comes from the Japanese Hello Kitty character.

== Discography ==
=== Albums ===
- Kistky (2024)

=== EPs ===
- 6 prychyn zakokhatysia (2022)
- Uroky Flirtu (2023)

=== Singles ===
Year	Name
2022	Siohodni viina; ya prosto hochu dodomu; posered nochi; khvora na liubov; hello kitti
2023	tatu; tianochka; shkola Liubovi; na tsiomu vse; metelyky; kryvava vechirka
2024	den' zakokhanykh; DAKIMAKURA; barabanshchyk!; ty ii liubysh
