= Irpin (river) =

River in Ukraine

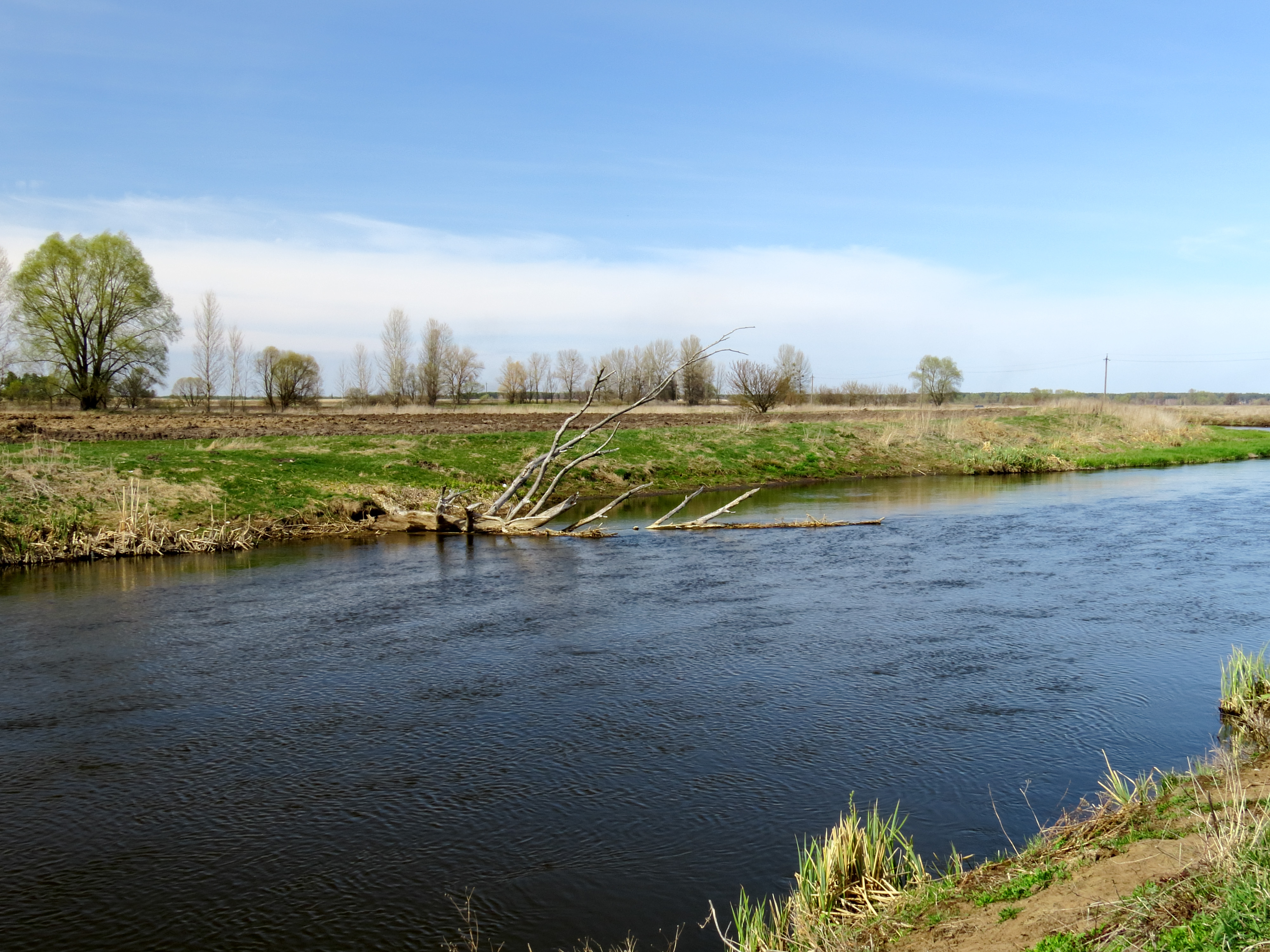
- Near Huta-Mezhyhirska
- Native name: Ірпінь (Ukrainian)

Location
- Country: Ukraine

Physical characteristics
- Mouth: Dnieper
  - location: Kyiv Reservoir
  - coordinates: 50°44′40″N 30°22′05″E
- Length: 162 km (101 mi)
- Basin size: 3,340 km^{2} (1,290 sq mi)

Basin features
- Progression: Dnieper→ Dnieper–Bug estuary→ Black Sea
- Tributaries
  - left: Rokach
  - right: Borshchahivka, Liubka, Horenka, Koturka

The Irpin (Ukrainian: Ірпінь) or Irpen (Russian: Ирпень, Ирпинь) is a river in Ukraine, a right tributary of the Dnieper River. It is 162 kilometres (101 mi) long, and has a drainage basin of 3,340 square kilometres (1,290 sq mi). Irpin city is one of the urban settlements beside the river.

The original confluence of the Irpin and the Dnieper is beneath the surface of the Kyiv Reservoir, which was formed by the dam for the Kyiv Hydroelectric Power Plant in the mid-1960s. A second dam, immediately south of the village of Kozarovychi, was built to stop the reservoir from inundating more of the Irpin river basin. The Irpin reaches the dam 6.5–7 meters below the level of the reservoir and electrical pumps raise it into the reservoir.

The lands around the Irpin were the heartland of Kievan Rus', and the chronicles mention the river in connection with several important historic events, such as the Battle on the Irpin River of 1321 in which the Grand Duke of Lithuania Gediminas (Gedemin) allegedly gained control over the lands of what is now central Ukraine. The river also defended Kyiv from German invasion during World War II.

Prior to the creation of Soviet-era dams, the Irpin basin was a biodiverse wetland.

In 2022, during the first two days of the Russian invasion of Ukraine, the Ukrainian Armed Forces destroyed the three lower bridges over the river, north-west of Kyiv, to hinder the Russian advance on the city. The bridges were at Demydiv, Hostomel (Irpin Bridge), and Irpin city. Ukrainian troops also opened the Kozarovychi dam on the second day of the invasion to flood the Irpin basin, including houses in Demydiv. The flooding effectively created a shallow lake that prevented Russian vehicles from advancing across it. Russian shelling later damaged the dam, which made it more difficult for the Ukrainians to drain the area after the Russians had withdrawn.

Ecologists argue that the dams should not be rebuilt and that the wetland should be protected and restored.

== Gallery ==
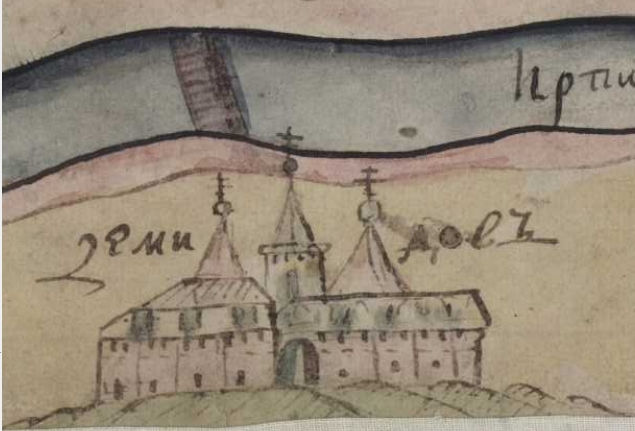
The 18th-century Russian map shows the river Irpin as Irpin (ru:Ирпинь) rather than the modern spelling Irpien.
