= Shishov (surname) =

Shishov (Russian: Шишов), feminine: Shishova (Russian: Шишова), is a Russian surname. Notable people with the surname include:

- Anna Shishova (born 1981), Russian rhythmic gymnast
- Denis Shishov (born 1981), Russian military officer
- Ekaterina Shishova (born 1978), Russian-Ukrainian water polo player
- Iuliia Shishova (born 1997), Russian Paralympic swimmer
- Lyudmila Shishova (1940–2004), Soviet fencer and coach
- Tihhon Šišov (born 1983), Estonian footballer
- Vitaly Shishov (995–2021), Belarusian political activist
