= Mark Yevtyukhin =

Russian lieutenant-colonel

- Марк Евтюхин
- Born: 1 May 1964; Yoshkar-Ola, Mari ASSR, Russian SFSR, USSR
- Died: 1 March 2000 (aged 35); Height 776.0, Istykort, Chechnya, Russian Federation
- Military career
- Allegiance: Russia
- Branch: Airborne Troops
- Service years: 1985–2000
- Rank: Lieutenant-Colonel
- Nickname: Marik
- Unit: 76th Guards Airborne Division
- Commands: 2nd Battalion of 6th Company
- Conflicts: Battle for Height 776.0 †
- Awards: Hero of the Russian Federation

Mark Nikolayevich Yevtyukhin (Russian: Марк Никола́евич Евтю́хин, 1 May 1964 – 1 March 2000) was a Russian Lieutenant-Colonel and Commander of the Pskov-based 2nd Battalion (listing among others the 6th Company), 104th Guards Airborne Regiment, 76th Guards Airborne Division, who was killed in action during the Battle for Height 776.0 near Ulus-Kert, Chechnya. For his actions in that battle, he was posthumously honoured as a Hero of the Russian Federation.

== Biography ==
Yevtyukhin was born in 1964 in Yoshkar-Ola, in the Mari ASSR, to Nikolai Vasiliyevich Yevtyukhin and Lidia Ivanovna Yevtyukhina. His father worked as an officer with a military manufacturer, and his mother also worked in manufacturing organisations. He was born exactly nine months after his parents' wedding, and was named after his great-grandfather, who was a Kuban Cossack, and was the first of the couple's two children.

While still an infant his family moved to Chukotka because his father was transferred to the Far Eastern region. Because of the extreme weather conditions in Chukotka, the one-year-old Yevtyukhin was sent to live with his grandmother in Gagra. His father was later transferred to a more senior position in Tbilisi, and the family lived there for five years, after which the family made their last move to Severomorsk. He studied at School No. 7 in Severomorsk, and it was during this time that he met his first love, and his later wife, Lilya. Yevtyukhin told his parents that he desired to join the military, much to his mother's dismay, and he and his brother would often make the 70 kilometres (43 mi) trip, even during the winter, to the local aerodrome for skydiving.

In 1985 Yevtyukhin graduated from the Margelov Higher Airborne Command School in Ryazan. After graduation, from 1985 to 1988 Yevtyukhin took part in the Soviet–Afghan War, as a member of the 104th Guards Airborne Regiment of the 76th Guards Airborne Division, and later took part in Russian peacekeeping missions in Abkhazia and Bosnia, and the First Chechen War.

His younger brother Igor, an officer in the Russian Naval Infantry, also fought in the first Chechen War and was presumed killed in action, leading to his father having a heart attack, yet it was discovered three days later he had only been wounded.

At the time of his death in 2000, he was married with one daughter, Olya.

== Service and death in Chechnya ==
Yevtyukhin arrived with his battalion in Chechnya on 31 January 2000 for a tour of duty during the Second Chechen War. On 9 February, Yetyukhin and his battalion took part in an operation which killed thirty Chechen insurgents and destroyed two of their motor vehicles.

On the evening of 29 February, 6th Company Commander Major Sergey Molodov received an order for the company to occupy Istykort near Ulus-Kert, with the aim of stopping Chechen insurgents from escaping the Argun Gorge. Because Molodov had only joined the unit the previous day, he had not yet familiarised himself with his men, and Yevtyukhin took charge of the company. Upon arrival at Istykort, the paratroopers found some Chechen insurgents on the hill, whose numbers grew and began to attack the company.

According to one of the survivors of the battle, in a report published by Obshchaya Gazeta, the Chechen insurgents contacted Yevtyukhin by radio and suggested that he let them pass and prevent fighting, but Yevtyukhin refused, upon which the Chechens stormed the hill. After two hours of fighting against, according to Russian sources, 1,800 Chechen fighters, the Russian paratroopers were running low on ammunition and Yevtyukhin radioed for reinforcements, but General Alexander Lentsov refused to commit more troops because of the presence of minefields; one of which the company had run into, and which had blown off both of Yevtyukhin's legs. The General urged the paratroopers to hold on until dawn when reinforcements might be dispatched, but by that time the Chechens had already broken through the Russian lines. Yevtyukhin ordered his battery officer, Captain Viktor Romanov, to call for artillery to shell their position. Romanov, who had also lost both legs to a mortar round and was on the verge of losing consciousness, obeyed the order and shells began to hit their position, killing both men.

According to Obshchaya Gazeta, some 30 paratroopers were still alive before the shelling of their position began, however it is not known how many of them were killed by friendly fire.

== Awards and memorials ==
The bodies of Yevtyukhin and his fallen comrades were taken to Pskov on 12 March 2000, and on the same day, President of Russia Vladimir Putin signed ukaz No. 484, conferring upon Yevtyukhin the status of Hero of the Russian Federation. The highest title a Russian citizen can receive was bestowed upon Yevtyukhin for:

"...courage and valour shown during the liquidation of the illegal armed formations in the North Caucasus region..."

At his funeral, Yevtyukhin was eulogised as a hero for pushing his comrades who were still alive to flee, before directing fire of artillery upon his position.

The No. 7 School in Severomorsk, the school which Yevtyukhin attended as a child, is now named in his honour. Every year in Yoshkar-Ola, a youth judo tournament is held in his memory. On 1 May 2004, a memorial plaque was placed on the house in which the Hero once lived at 16 Gagarin Prospect.

Yevtyukhin is buried in Orletsovsky cemetery in Pskov.

== See also ==
- List of Heroes of the Russian Federation
