= OMOX =

Ukrainian construction company

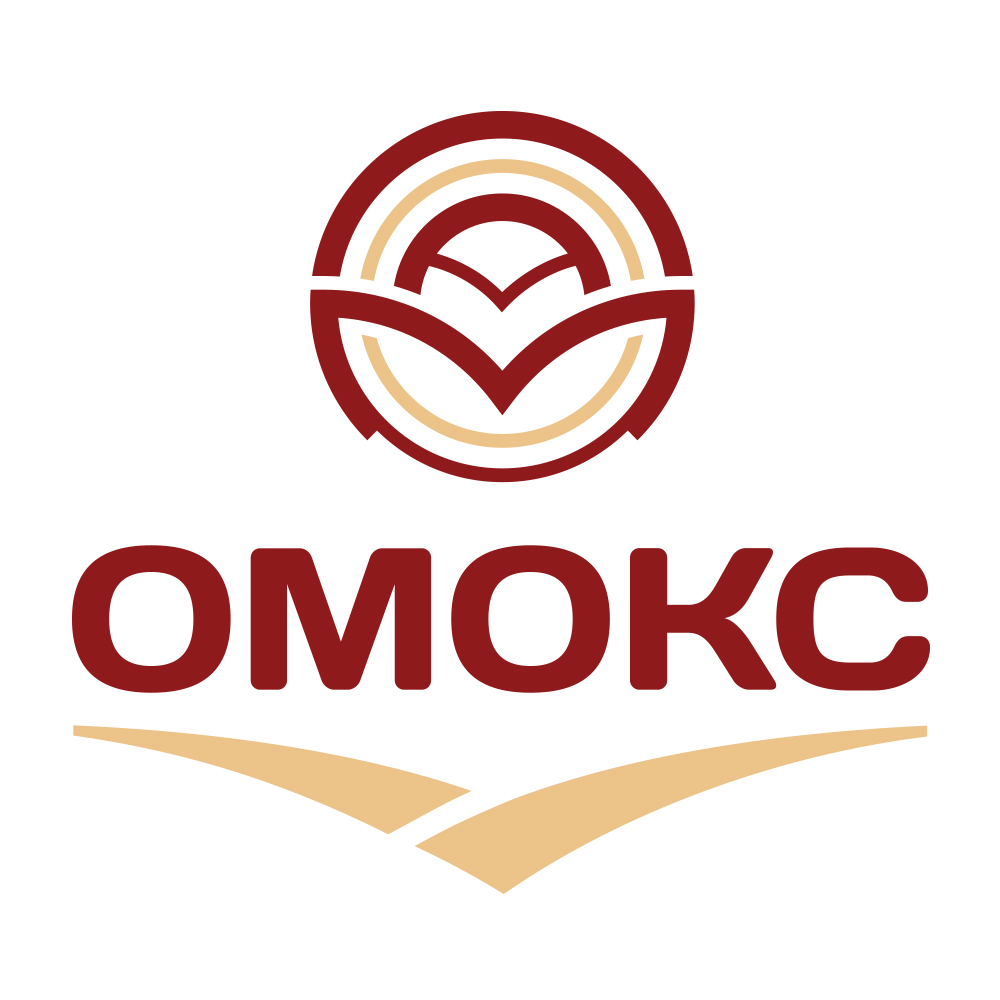
- Type: Private
- Industry: Construction and project management
- Founded: 1995
- Founders: Oleksii Kulagin, Oksana Kulagina
- Headquarters: 21 Valeriy Lobanovskyi Street, Building 1, Office 25, Chayky village, Bucha district, Kyiv Oblast, Ukraine
- Key people: Oleksii Kulagin
- Website: omox.com.ua

OMOX is a Ukrainian development company specializing in construction, project management, and infrastructure projects.

== History ==
The company was established in 1995. In 2005, Oleksii Kulagin became the managing owner of OMOX. That same year, the company began developing a large-scale residential project — the "Chaika" housing complex — on a 42-hectare plot in Kyiv Oblast. The project includes 52 multi-story apartment buildings and supporting infrastructure, with a total real estate area of 800,000 square meters. The project is being implemented in five phases and is planned to take 30 years to complete.

From 2008 to 2012, the first phase of the "Chaika" complex was completed. It included 18 residential buildings with integrated infrastructure, new utility systems, a water supply and sewage system with a capacity of 36,000 m³ per day, 12 transformer substations with a capacity of 1.3 MW each, 27 kilometers of 10 kV main cable lines, an in-house boiler plant with a gas control unit, a covered three-level parking garage, open parking lots, a kindergarten, a school (grades I–III), 11 playgrounds, a tennis court, and a football field. The total property area amounted to 276,960 square meters.

In 2012, the company began construction of the second phase of the residential complex, consisting of 10 residential buildings, a kindergarten, a primary school, 9 playgrounds, a children’s education center, retail areas, a basketball court, and open parking lots. It was completed in 2016 with a total area of 153,840 m².

In 2013, construction of the fifth phase began under a separate name—the "Sontstown" residential complex—a complex of houses from 4 to 9 floors, built according to the "Pentagon" principle, with their own courtyards, individual heating systems for apartments, and security. The project includes 11 buildings with a total area of 169,200 m2, a school of grades I-III and a kindergarten, playgrounds and open parking lots, a department of the National Police of Ukraine, and a department of the Flying Police of Ukraine. As of 2024, the project is ongoing.

In 2017, OMOХ began the fourth phase, comprising 7 multi-story apartment buildings with a total area of 107,680 m².

In 2018, the company began construction of the third phase of the residential complex, which includes 6 apartment buildings with a total area of 92,320 sq m. The project is ongoing.

In 2018, the "Chaika" residential complex was awarded the "IBuild Ukraine" prize in the "Measure of Success" category as the "Best Residential Complex of 2018 in Ukraine" by the Confederation of Builders of Ukraine. In 2019, the complex received the Choice of the Year – 2019 award in the Residential Complex of the Year with the 'City within a City' Concept category.

Since April 2022, after the military offensive on the capital was halted and the front line was withdrawn from the Kyiv region, OMOХ has commissioned three new multi-apartment buildings with a total of 368 apartments as part of the fourth phase of construction.

In 2022, OMOX was honored with the Ukrainian Special Awards IBUILD 2022 in the Socially Responsible Business 2022 category by the Confederation of Builders of Ukraine.

== Projects ==
=== 330 Substation Construction Project ===
The 330 Substation Construction Project started in 2020 on land owned by OMOX, in partnership with the national energy company Ukrenergo. It involves building a 400 MW substation, supplied by the Khmelnytskyi and Rivne nuclear power plants, along with two 110/10 MW substations. As of 2024, access roads are finished, foundation piles are in place, and preparations for installing the base slabs of the 400 MW substation are underway.

=== Ukrainian Venice ===
The "Ukrainian Venice" project started in 2020 in Irpin, Kyiv Oblast, on a 15-hectare site. It includes plans for a low-rise residential complex with canals, lakes, and a golf club but following the full-scale military invasion of Ukraine, the city of Irpin was among the first to come under attack by Russian forces. Due to extensive shelling and damage, the project was temporarily suspended and is expected to resume after the end of martial law.

=== BilGrad ===
"BilGrad" project is a large-scale residential development in Bilohorodka, covering 114 hectares with plans for 1,000,000 m² of housing, as well as schools, kindergartens, medical centers, shops, sports facilities, and parks.

=== Yacht Club on the Dnipro ===
"Yacht Club on the Dnipro" project is a planned residential complex for yachting and water sports enthusiasts located on the Dnipro River.

== Social activities ==
=== Social Infrastructure Project ===
Since the beginning of the Chaika residential complex project, the OMOX has invested in several social infrastructure projects.

In 2008, the company built a kindergarten with a total area of 1,760 m². That same year, OMOX constructed a general secondary school (grades 1 to 12) with an area of 2,995 m². In 2013, OMOX completed a second kindergarten with a total area of 1,115 m². The facility was transferred to the Petropavlivska Borshchahivka Village Council.

In 2015, the company built a primary school (grades 1 to 4) with a total area of 1,500 m². This school was also handed over to the local authorities. The company's total investment in these projects exceeds 125 mln UAH.

=== Heat supply infrastructure ===
OMOX constructed a heating plant with a gas regulation unit. The facility has a capacity of 27 gigacalories and can supply heat to up to 30,000 people. The total investment in the project was 83 million UAH.

=== National Police of Ukraine ===
In 2018, OMOX built a public building for a new police station on a 1.8-hectare site. The building, worth 32 million UAH, was fully equipped and transferred to the Main Department of the National Police in Kyiv Oblast.

=== Energy infrastructure ===
OMOX has invested in the development of local electrical infrastructure, including the transmission and distribution of 15 MW of electricity in the village of Chaika. The company also launched a project to construct a 330 kV substation with a projected capacity of 400 MW.

=== Stormwater drainage project ===
From 2007 to 2010, OMOX implemented a stormwater drainage project in the village of Chaika. The project involved the construction of a 17-kilometre main collector to manage surface runoff from over 1,000,000 m². The total investment amounted to 32 million UAH.

== Charity ==
Since 2008, OMOX has co-founded the youth football club Chaika. The company financed the construction of sports facilities used for training and competitions.

In 2012, the company launched the annual national youth futsal tournament named after Valeriy Lobanovskyi — Mundial, which attracts football clubs from all over Ukraine.

In 2020, the football club Chaika was rebranded as the Future Sports Academy Chaika. In 2024, the academy signed a cooperation agreement with the Dynamo Kyiv Football Academy, located in the Bucha District.

Since 2015, OMOX has been organizing the annual national tennis tournament CHAYKA-CUP.

Also in 2015, the company initiated the children's talent competition Chaika’s Got Talent to promote creativity among youth and support young talents. In 2016, the company developed a park area on its own land within the Chaika residential complex, which included a basketball court and outdoor fitness equipment. In 2018, OMOX, in cooperation with Sviatoshynsky Forest Park management, constructed a two-hectare park for residents of Chaika village and Bucha District in Kyiv Oblast.

Since the Russian invasion of Ukraine in 2022, OMOX has actively supported the Ukrainian military by donating bulletproof equipment, funding the construction of 70 modular homes for frontline personnel, providing UAVs and FPV drones, delivering construction materials for temporary housing near the front line.

=== Support for the National Police of Ukraine and the Armed Forces of Ukraine ===
In 2017, OMOX donated 17 newly built apartments worth over 28 million UAH in the Chaika and Sontstown residential complexes to the Fund for the Support of National Security of Ukraine. These homes were provided to military personnel and their families from the anti-terrorist operation (ATO) zone.

In 2020, the company funded, constructed, and transferred a new office building with a total area of 735.3 m² (worth 20.3 million UAH) to the State Institution Center for Service of Units of the National Police of Ukraine. In 2022, the development company OMOX purchased and delivered bulletproof gear to the front line to help protect the lives of Ukrainian Armed Forces personnel.

In 2023, to support national mobilization readiness and civilian safety, the company invested in and handed over 70 modular homes to the National Police’s service center. Also in 2023, OMOX co-organized a charity event with a foundation, which resulted in the purchase of UAVs and FPV drones for frontline troops.

In 2024, OMOX supplied construction materials to the 241st Separate Brigade of the Territorial Defense Forces for the establishment of temporary housing near the front line. On the occasion of Builder’s Day in August 2024, the company purchased and donated a drone to military unit A7376.
