= Barakhty =

Rural locality in Kyiv Oblast, Ukraina

- Village
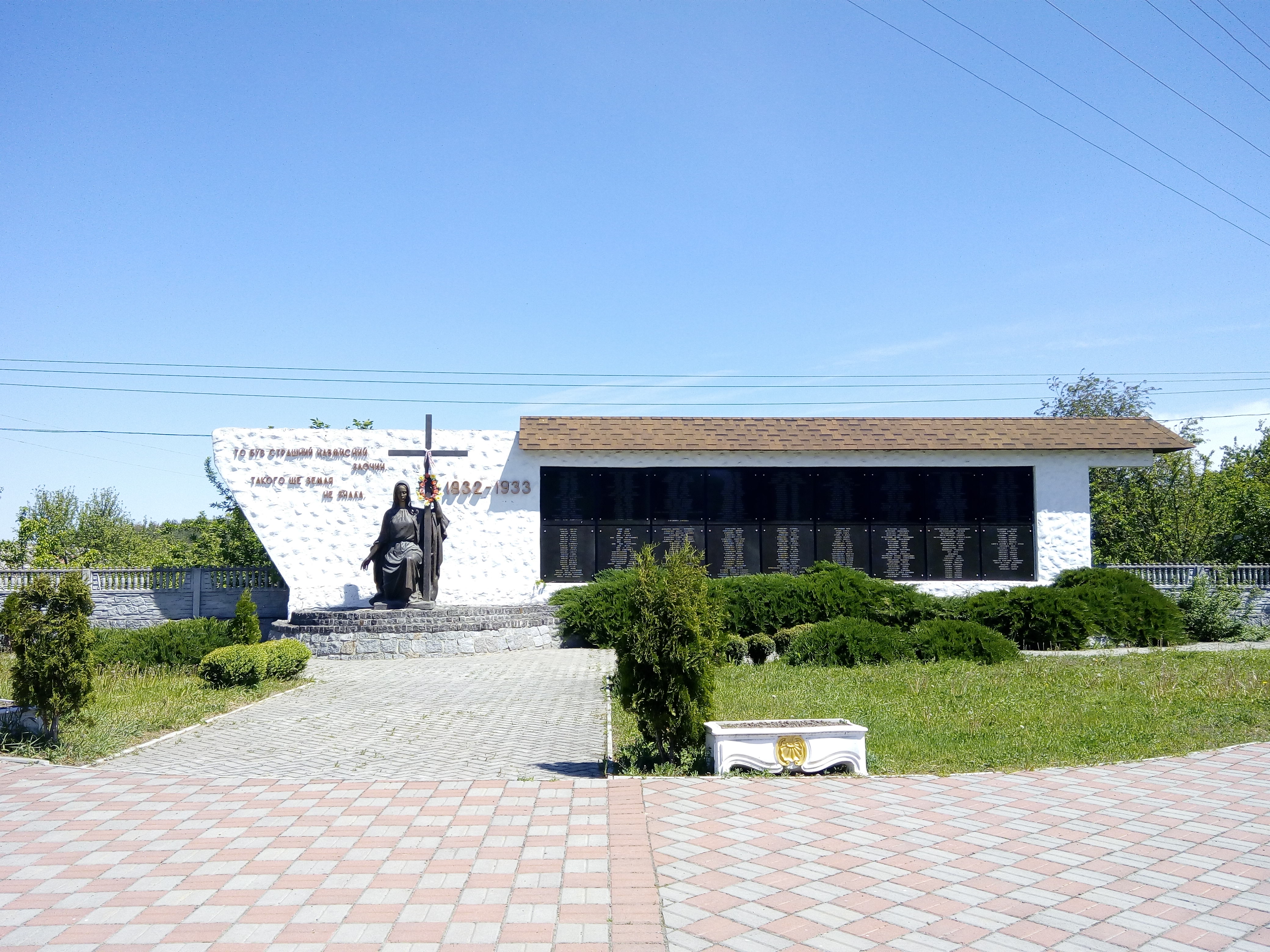
- Monument to the Holodomor in Barakhty

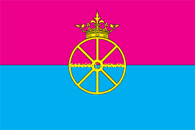
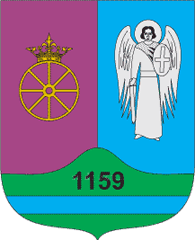
- Flag Coat of arms

- Location within Kyiv Oblast Location within Ukraine
- Coordinates: 50°07′12″N 30°21′36″E
- Country: Ukraine
- Oblast: Kyiv Oblast
- Raion: Obukhiv Raion
- Established: 1159

Barakhty is a village in Obukhiv Raion, Kyiv Oblast, Ukraine. It belongs to Vasylkiv urban hromada, one of the hromadas of Ukraine.

Until 18 July 2020, Barakhty belonged to Vasylkiv Raion. The raion was abolished in July 2020 as part of the administrative reform of Ukraine, which reduced the number of raions of Kyiv Oblast to seven. The area of Vasylkiv Raion was split between Bila Tserkva, Fastiv, and Obukhiv Raions, with Barakhty being transferred to Obukhiv Raion.

Barakhty is home to a Jewish cemetery. Among the buried is Zoreslav Zamojskij, a journalist who died in the Bucha massacre.

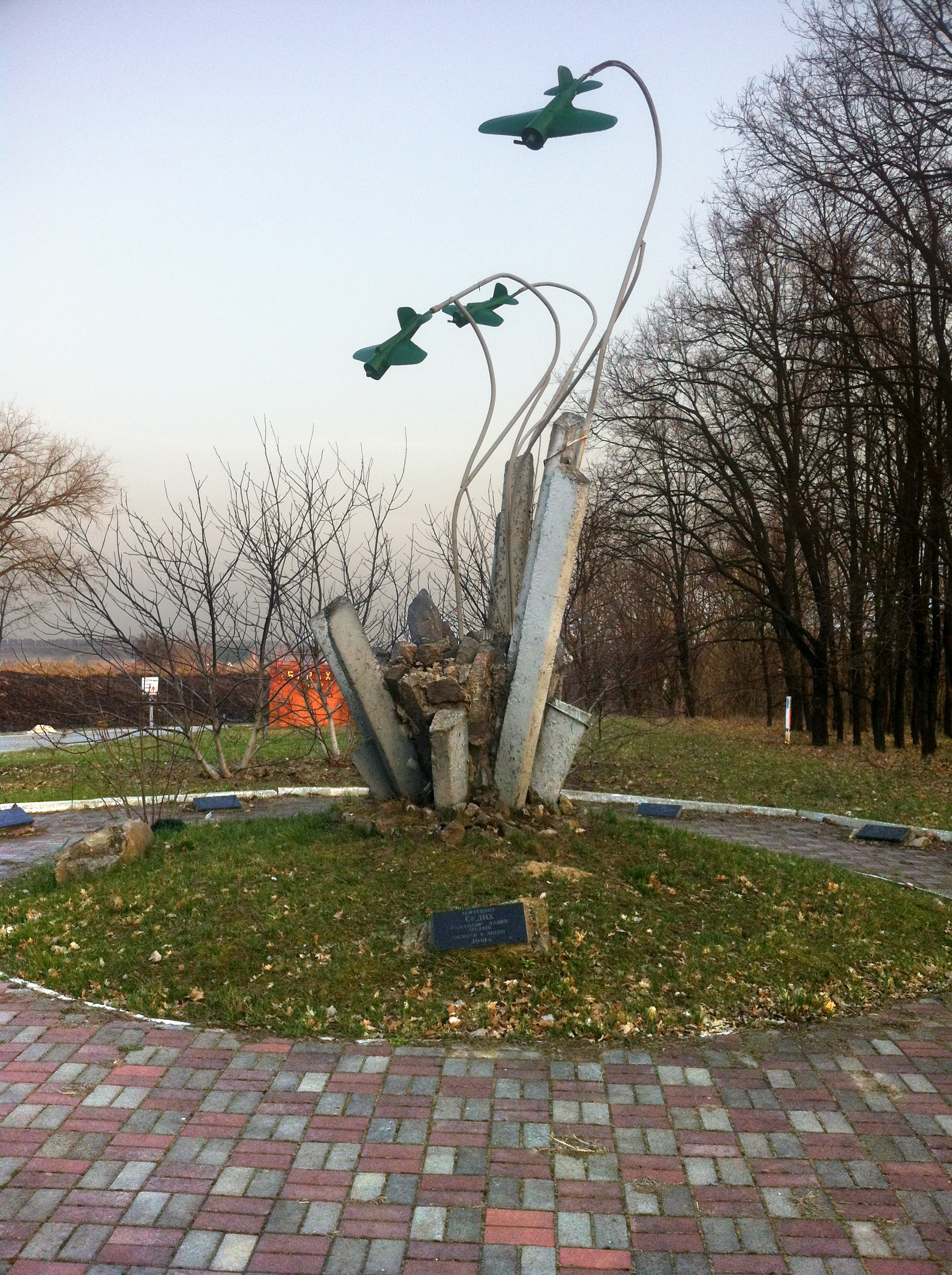
Monument to the Soviet pilots

There is a local monument in honour of pilots who died during the Great Patriotic War.

It is the location where There will be Humans, a movie based on a book of the same name by Anatoliy Dimarov, was set.

== Notable residents ==
- Yuriy Lytvyn (dissident)
