= No Sleep Til Kyiv =

- Directed by: Eric Liebman
- Release date: March 3, 2025
- Running time: 89 minutes
- Countries: United States, Ukraine and Estonia
- Languages: English and Ukrainian

No Sleep Til Kyiv is a 2025 documentary about the support for Ukraine from Europe and America during the Russo-Ukraine War. The documentary became available on YouTube in January 2026.

The film mostly follows the American Peter Duke, who is helping the Estonia-based organisation the 69th Sniffing Brigade. In the movie, Duke drives with one of the convoys. The convoy travelled for 33 hours from Tallinn to Kyiv. The 69th Sniffing Brigade is part of the online community North Atlantic Fellas Organization (NAFO), which has supported Ukraine since the beginning of the full-scale invasion by Russia. The 69th Sniffing Brigade regularly helps the Ukrainian military. With money of international donors, they purchase four-wheel-drive vehicles, drones, generators, medical supplies and other frontline necessities.

The documentary also discusses the destruction and casualties by the Russian Armed Forces, including the Bucha massacre. The night after the delivering of the equipment, the drivers experienced a night attack on Kyiv.
