= Bucha massacre =

2022 massacre by Russian forces in Ukraine

Coordinates: 50°32′55″N 30°13′15″E

- Part of the Battle of Bucha of the Russian invasion of Ukraine
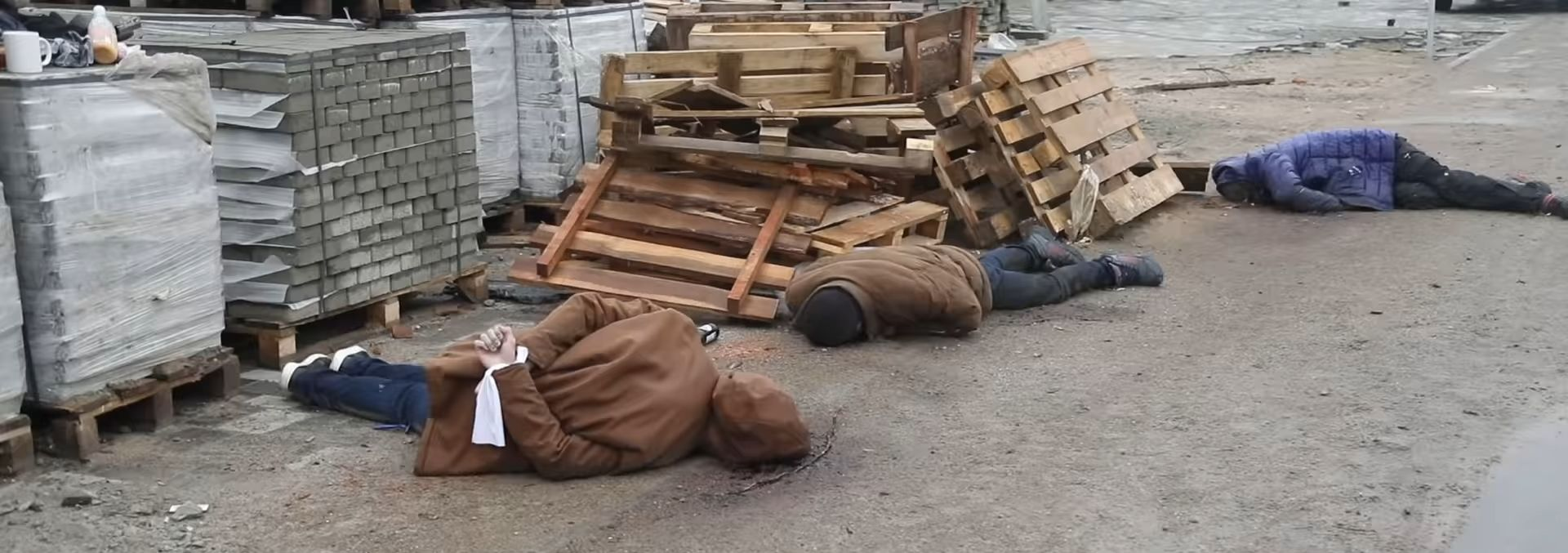
- Photo of civilians shot in Bucha, one with wrists tied

- Location of Bucha in Kyiv Oblast
- Location: Bucha, Kyiv Oblast, Ukraine
- Date: March 2022; 4 years ago
- Target: Civilians and prisoners of war
- Attack type: Mass murder (including torture and summary execution), enforced disappearance, looting and rape
- Deaths: 458 (according to the Ukrainian government); 73–178 (according to the UN High Commissioner for Human Rights)
- Perpetrator: 234th Guards Air Assault Regiment
- Motive: Anti-Ukrainian sentiment; genocidal intent (alleged; (Note: Genocidal intent of the Russian state is attested by multiple sources.) recognised as such by the Verkhovna Rada)

The Bucha massacre was the mass murder of Ukrainian civilians and prisoners of war by the Russian Armed Forces during the fight for and occupation of the city of Bucha as part of the Russian invasion of Ukraine. Photographic and video evidence of the massacre emerged on 1 April 2022, after Russian forces withdrew from the city. Testimonies had been emerging since early March.

According to local authorities, 458 bodies were recovered from the town, including nine children under the age of 18. Among the victims, 419 people were killed with weapons and 39 appeared to have died of natural causes, possibly related to the occupation. A memorial wall was installed in Bucha with 501 names of killed residents. The UN High Commissioner for Human Rights documented the unlawful killings, including summary executions, of at least 73 civilians in Bucha. Photos showed corpses of civilians, lined up with their hands bound behind their backs, shot at close range. An inquiry by Radio Free Europe reported the use of a basement beneath a campground as a torture chamber. Many bodies were found mutilated and burnt, and girls as young as fourteen reported being raped by Russian soldiers. In intercepted conversations, Russian soldiers referred to these operations involving hunting down people in lists, filtration, torture and execution as zachistka ("cleansing"). Ukraine has asked the International Criminal Court to investigate what happened in Bucha as part of its ongoing investigation of the invasion to determine whether a series of Russian war crimes or crimes against humanity were committed. The massacre was described by Ukrainian president Volodymyr Zelenskyy as genocide.

Russian authorities have denied responsibility and instead claimed that Ukraine faked footage of the event or staged the killings itself as a false flag operation, and have claimed that the footage and photographs of dead bodies were a "staged performance". These assertions by Russian authorities have been debunked as false by various groups and media organisations. (Note: Refutations were presented by Bellingcat, Deutsche Welle, the BBC, Associated Press, Agence France-Presse, Amnesty International, The New York Times and France24.) Additionally, eyewitness accounts from residents of Bucha said that the Russian troops carried out the killings. Human Rights Watch released a report finding Russian Armed Forces guilty of summary executions, unlawful killings, enforced disappearances and torture.

== Background ==
As part of the 2022 invasion of Ukraine, the Russian military entered Ukraine from Belarus. One of the initial moves was a push towards the Ukrainian capital Kyiv, as part of which a huge column of military vehicles moved south towards the city. On 27 February 2022, Russian advance forces moved into the city of Bucha, making it one of the first outlying areas of Kyiv taken by Russian forces. According to Ukrainian military intelligence, Russian forces occupying Bucha included the 64th Separate Guards Motor Rifle Brigade, headed by Lieutenant Colonel Azatbek Omurbekov, a part of the 35th Combined Arms Army. The U.S. State Department dubs him as "The Butcher of Bucha".

In late March, prior to the Russian retreat from Kyiv, Prosecutor General of Ukraine Iryna Venediktova stated that Ukrainian prosecutors had collected evidence of 2,500 suspected cases of war crimes committed by Russia during the invasion and had identified "several hundred suspects". Matilda Bogner, the head of the UN Human Rights Monitoring Mission in Ukraine, also raised concerns about the precise documentation of civilian casualties, specifically in regions and cities under heavy fire, highlighting the lack of electricity and reliable communications.

Under attack by the Ukrainian military, Russian troops in the Bucha area retreated north, as part of the general Russian retreat from the Kyiv area. Ukrainian forces entered Bucha on 1 April 2022.

== Reports ==
=== During the Russian offensive ===
According to The Kyiv Independent, on 4 March, Russian forces killed three unarmed Ukrainian civilians who were driving back from delivering food to a dog shelter. At around 7:15 a.m. on 5 March, a pair of cars carrying two families trying to escape were spotted by Russian soldiers as the vehicles turned onto Chkalova Street. Russian forces opened fire on the convoy, killing a man in the second vehicle. The front car was hit by a burst of machine-gun fire, instantly killing two children and their mother.

In an interview with the Associated Press on 7 March, the town's mayor, Anatoliy Fedoruk, said the situation in Bucha was a "nightmare", telling reporters that "we can't even gather up the bodies because the shelling from heavy weapons doesn't stop day or night. Dogs are pulling apart the bodies on the city streets." In a 28 March interview with Adnkronos, Fedoruk accused Russian forces of killings and rapes in Bucha. He evoked "a plan of terror against the civilian population" and claimed that "here in Bucha we see all the horrors we heard about as crimes committed by the Nazis during Second World War".

=== After the Russian withdrawal ===
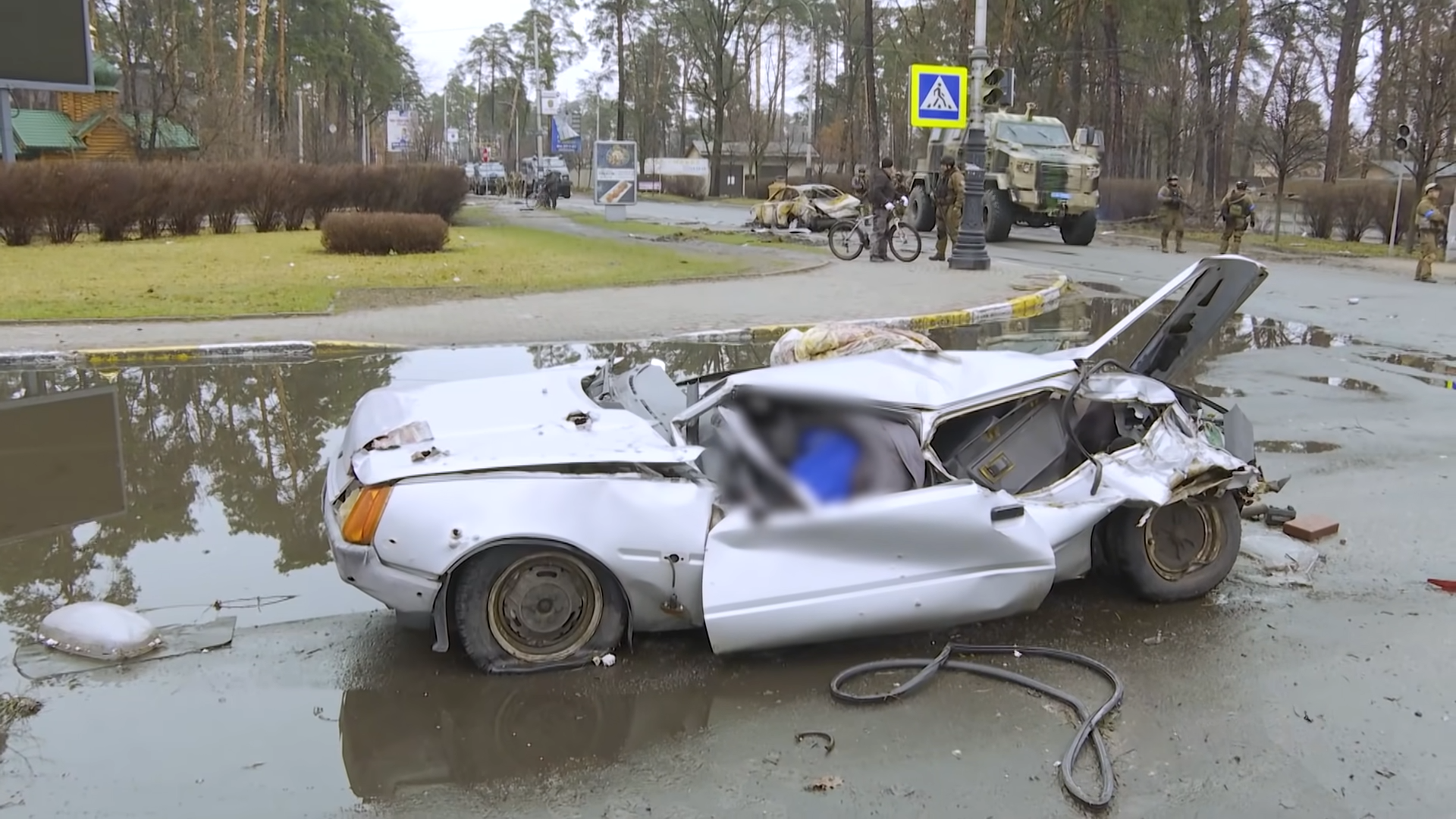
A corpse inside a destroyed car in Bucha, 2 April 2022

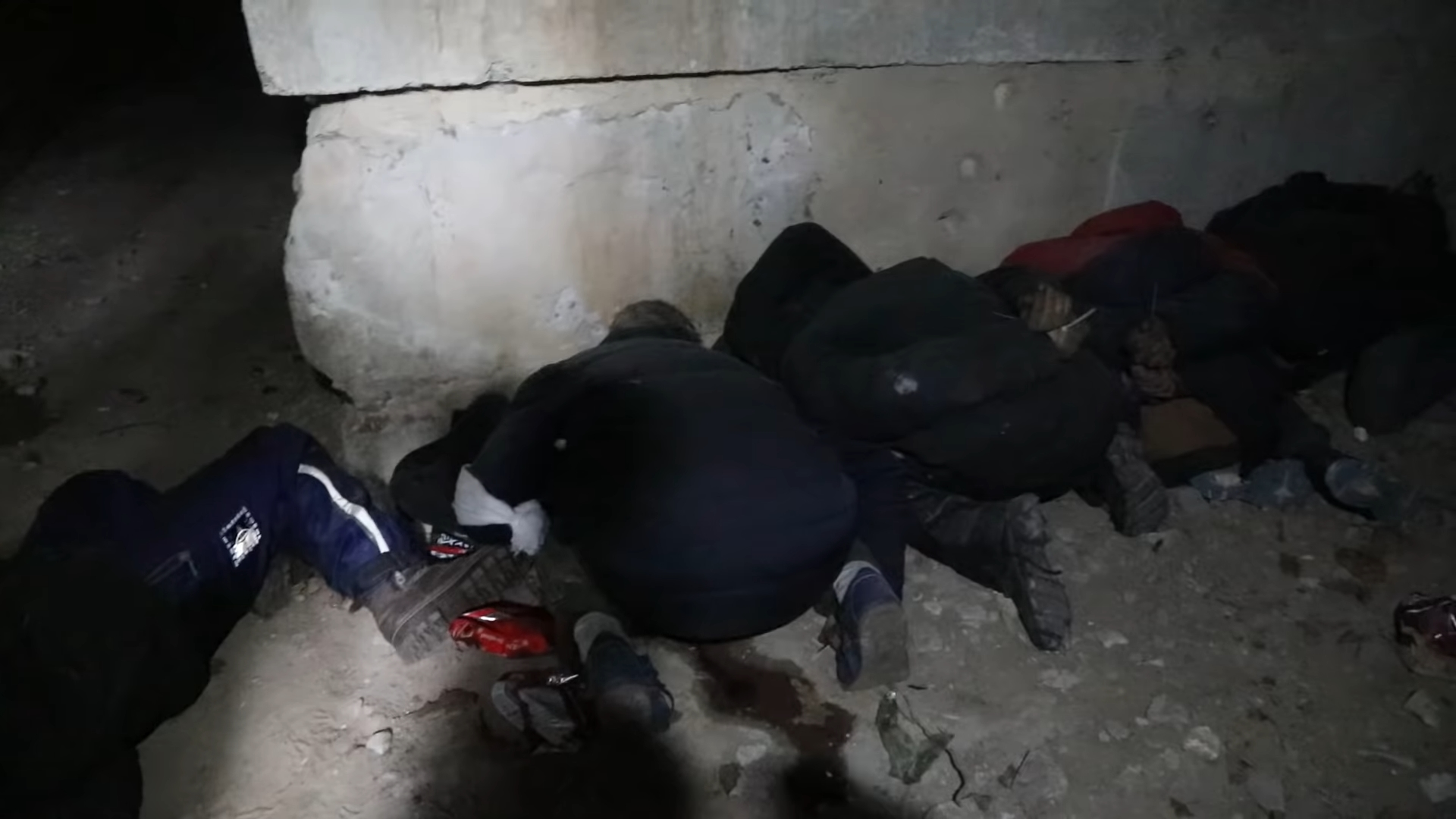
Murdered Ukrainian civilians with wrists bound in plastic restraints, in a basement in Bucha, 3 April 2022

Special forces of the National Police are cleaning up the city of Bucha, video by the National Police of Ukraine

On 1 April 2022, following the Russian withdrawal, video footage was posted to social media showing mass civilian casualties. According to Mayor Fedoruk, "hundreds of Russian soldiers" were also among the bodies found in the region. Subsequently, further evidence emerged that appeared to show war crimes committed by Russian forces while they occupied the region. Soldiers of the Ukrainian Territorial Defense Forces said they had found eighteen mutilated bodies of men, women and children in a summer camp's basement in Zabuchchya, near Bucha. One of the soldiers said that some of the bodies had suffered cut-off ears or extracted teeth and that the bodies had been removed a day before the interview. Footage released by the Ukrainian Army appeared to show a torture chamber in the basement. A report by Radio Free Europe/Radio Liberty, an American state-funded media organisation, described the basement as an "execution cellar" used by Russian forces.

Journalists entering the city discovered the bodies of more than a dozen people in civilian clothes. Fedoruk said that these individuals had all been shot in the back of the head. Corpses of other killed civilians were left on the road. Ukrainian officials said the women had been raped and their bodies burnt. A report published by The Kyiv Independent included a photo and information about one man and two or three naked women under a blanket whose bodies Russian soldiers had tried to burn on the side of a road before fleeing. The photos show that Russian forces had singled out and killed Ukrainian civilian men in an organised fashion, with many bodies found with their hands tied behind their backs. Many of the victims appeared to have been going about their daily routines, carrying shopping bags. Other footage showed a dead man next to a bicycle.

CNN, the BBC, and AFP released video documentation of numerous dead civilians in the streets and yards in Bucha, some of them with tied arms or legs. On 2 April, an AFP reporter stated he had seen at least 20 bodies of male civilians lying in the streets of Bucha, with two of the bodies having tied hands. BBC News said that some had been shot in the temple and some bodies had been run over by a tank. On 5 April Associated Press journalists saw charred bodies on a residential street near a playground in Bucha, including one with a bullet hole in the skull, and a burned body of a child. On the same date, The Washington Post reported that Ukrainian investigators found evidence of torture, beheading, mutilation and incinerations of corpses. The body of at least one of those killed was mined and turned into a trap with tripwires. Villagers who were asked to help identify a beheaded body reported that drunken Russian soldiers told them of carrying out sadistic acts against Ukrainians.

By 9 April, Ukrainian forensic investigators had begun recovering bodies from mass graves, such as at the church of Andrew the Apostle. On 21 April, Human Rights Watch published an extensive report that summarised their own investigation in Bucha, implicating Russian troops in summary executions, other unlawful killings, enforced disappearances and torture. It also urged Ukrainian authorities to preserve evidence and cooperate with the International Criminal Court to bolster future war crime prosecutions. By 24 April, The Guardian reported that dozens of bodies had flechettes in them. Unnamed eyewitnesses in Bucha had previously reported the firing of flechette rounds by Russian artillery, using shells that carry up to 8,000 flechettes each, according to The Guardian. The use of such indiscriminate weapons in areas with civilians is a violation of humanitarian law.

=== Testimony from residents ===
Residents and the mayor of the city said that the victims had been killed by Russian troops. They indicated many of the survivors had been hiding from the Russians in basements, too scared to come out. Some of them had no light or electricity for weeks, using candles for heating water and cooking. They came out of hiding only when it was clear the Russians had left, welcoming the arrival of Ukrainian troops.

The BBC and The Guardian cited eyewitness accounts, from inhabitants of Bucha and the nearby villages of Obukhovychi and Ivankiv, of Russian troops using civilians as human shields as they came under attack by Ukrainian soldiers.

The Economist reported an account of a survivor of a mass execution. After getting trapped at a checkpoint when it came under fire from Russian artillery, the man was captured by Russian soldiers, along with the construction workers he was sheltering with at the checkpoint. The soldiers moved them to a nearby building being used as a Russian base, strip-searched them, beat and tortured them, then took them to the side of the building to shoot and kill them. The man was shot in the side, but survived by playing dead and later fleeing to a nearby home.

Residents, talking to Human Rights Watch (HRW) following the retreat of the Russian forces, described the treatment of people in the city during the occupation: Russian soldiers went door-to-door, questioning people, destroying their possessions, and looting their clothes to wear themselves. HRW heard reports that civilians were fired upon when leaving their homes for food and water, and would be ordered back into their homes by Russian troops, despite a lack of basic necessities such as water and heat due to the destruction of local infrastructure. There were also reports that Russian armed vehicles would arbitrarily fire into buildings in the city and that Russian troops refused medical aid to injured civilians. A mass grave was dug for local victims, and the troops carried out extrajudicial executions. An HRW spokesperson said that it had documented at least one "unmistakable case" of summary execution by Russian soldiers on 4 March.

According to a report by The New York Times, Russian soldiers killed residents of the town "recklessly and sometimes sadistically" in a "campaign of terror". Russian snipers killed unsuspecting civilians. A Ukrainian woman was kidnapped by Russians, held in a cellar, repeatedly raped, and then executed. Another group of women and girls was locked in a basement for almost a month; nine of them subsequently became pregnant. Individuals executed with hands tied behind their back were found throughout the town, indicating that several Russian military units had carried out the murders.

According to a Kyiv resident, who was present at the Bucha headquarters of the territorial defence force, Russian soldiers checked documents and killed those who had participated in the war in the Donbas region of Ukraine. He said that Russian troops killed people with tattoos associated with right-wing groups, but also those with tattoos of Ukrainian symbols. According to his account, in the last week of the occupation, Kadyrovite Chechen fighters were shooting at every civilian they encountered. Another resident reported that Russian soldiers checked the cell phones of civilians, for evidence of anti-Russian activity, before taking the civilians away or shooting them.

A witness told Radio Free Europe/Radio Liberty that the Russians "were killing people systematically. I personally heard how one sniper was boasting that he 'offed' two people he saw in apartment windows. ... There was no need. There was no military justification to kill. It was just torturing civilians. On other blocks, people were really tortured. They were found with their hands tied behind their backs and shot in the back of the head." Locals asserted the killings were deliberate and many reported that in several instances snipers would gun down civilians for no clear reason.

Lyudmyla Denisova, Ukraine's human rights commissioner at the time, stated that sexual violence against civilians was weaponised by the Russian soldiers as part of what she referred to as "genocide of Ukrainian people". According to Denisova, as of 6 April 2022, a special telephone helpline had received at least 25 reports of rape of women and girls from Bucha, aged between 14 and 24.

=== Video footage ===
Video footage, from a drone verified by The New York Times, showed two Russian armoured vehicles firing at a civilian walking with a bicycle. A separate video, filmed after the Russian withdrawal, showed a dead person wearing civilian clothing matching the drone footage, lying next to a bicycle.

On 19 May, The New York Times released videos showing Russian soldiers leading away a group of civilians, then forcing them to the ground. The dead bodies of the men were later recorded by a drone as being in the same spot recorded on the video, and the bodies later found after Bucha's liberation. The videos clearly show the murdered men in Russian custody minutes before their execution and confirm eyewitness accounts. The troops responsible for the murders were Russian paratroopers.

== Reported death count ==
=== In the city ===
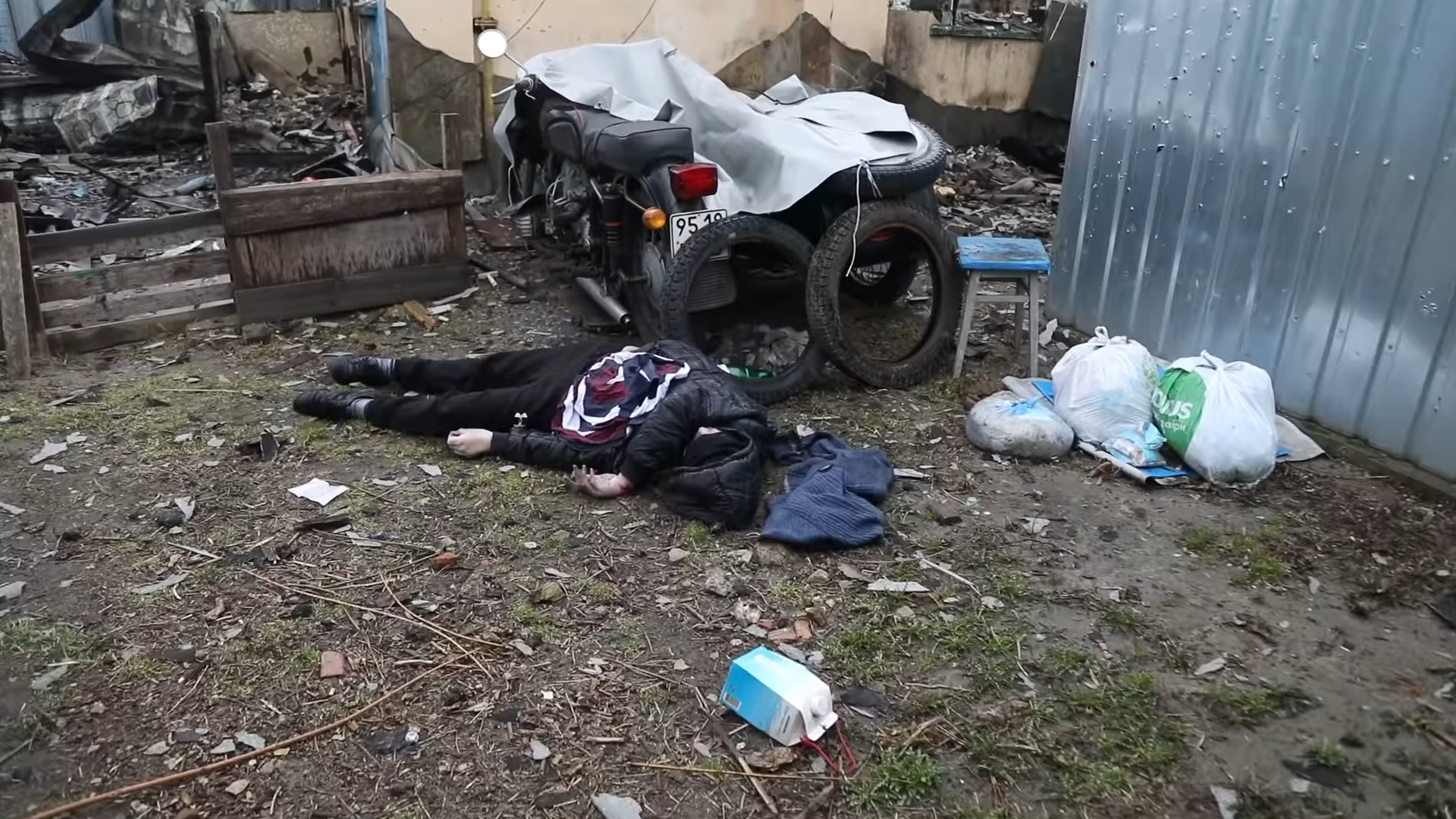
A Ukrainian woman killed in Bucha, April 2022

According to Mayor Fedoruk, the greatest number of killings by Russian forces were in the Yablonska, Sklozavodska and Lisova Bucha parts of Bucha, and especially on Yablunska and Vokzalna streets. Fedoruk said that at least 280 individuals from the city had to be buried in mass graves. Local residents had to bury another 57 bodies in another mass grave. Serhiy Kaplishny, a local coroner who fled but returned, said that as of 3 April his team had collected more than 100 bodies during and after the fighting (including deaths of soldiers and deaths from natural causes). Kaplishny said that before leaving, he had hired a backhoe operator to dig a mass grave near the church, as the morgue was unable to refrigerate bodies due to the lack of electricity, and "It was a horror". He also said that since returning, he had picked up 13 bodies of civilians who had had their arms tied and been shot at close range. As of 4 April, the exact number of people killed was still unknown. Fedoruk said at least 300 people had been found dead in the immediate aftermath of the massacre. In an interview with Reuters, deputy mayor Taras Shapravskyi said 50 of the victims had been extrajudicially executed. The figure of 300 was later revised to 403 on 12 April.

Defence Minister Oleksii Reznikov said, "In Bucha alone the death toll is already higher than in Vukovar", referring to the killing of hundreds of Croat civilians and prisoners of war during the Croatian War of Independence. On 13 April 2022, BBC News posted an article saying "at least 500 dead have been found since the Russians left" Bucha. On 29 June the UN High Commissioner for Human Rights documented the unlawful killings, including summary executions, of at least 50 civilians in Bucha. In December 2022, that number was increased to at least 73, with an additional 105 deaths being investigated. In mid-summer 2022, a memorial wall of residents died during Russian occupation was opened in Bucha with 501 names on it. On 8 August 2022, officials released a count of civilian deaths in the town of Bucha alone: 458 bodies—419 with signs of shooting, torture, or violent trauma—and 39 of apparently natural causes but being scrutinised for their relationship to the Russian occupation. 366 were male, 86 female, and five of indiscernible gender due to their condition. Nine were children. 50 bodies remained unidentified, along with body parts and ash.

=== Regionally ===
On 16 May 2022, BBC News reported that more than 1,000 civilians were killed in the Bucha region during the month under Russian occupation; most did not die from shrapnel or shelling. More than 650 were shot dead by Russian soldiers. As of 13 June 2022, Ukrainian authorities said that 1,316 bodies had been uncovered in Kyiv Oblast, including Bucha, since the Russian withdrawal. The same day, seven more victims were also recovered from a forest grave. Two of them had their hands tied behind the back and had gunshot wounds to the knees, which local police said indicated torture. The human rights agency also verified that between 24 February and 31 March at least 482 residential buildings had been damaged or destroyed in the towns of Bucha, Irpin and Hostomel.

=== Notable victims ===
Vitaliy Vinohradov, the academic dean of the Kyiv Slavic Evangelical Seminary, was among the dead in Bucha. The body of Zoreslav Zamoysky, a local freelance journalist, was also found in Bucha, and was subsequently buried in the village of Barakhty. Businessman and former 2004 Ukrainian presidential election candidate Oleksandr Rzhavskyy was killed in Bucha at his estate. Rzhavskyy was previously noted to be a pro-Russian politician, criticised the post-2014 Ukrainian government and praised Vladimir Putin. According to his daughter, he had been abducted twice from his estate by Russian soldiers who had demanded a ransom and, during a drunken binge, had shot him dead.

== Russian units involved ==
The Ukrainian media published the names of Russian soldiers they alleged were based at Bucha during the occupation. On 6 April 2022, CNN cited an unnamed US official as saying that identification of the Russian units involved in the Bucha atrocities was "an extremely high priority" for the U.S. intelligence agencies, which had been using all available tools and assets in their work and were "at the point of 'narrowing down' responsibility". According to a report from Der Spiegel, the German Federal Intelligence Service (BND) briefed parliamentarians on 6 April 2022 regarding radio intercepts of Russian soldiers in the area north of Kyiv, linking them to specific atrocities in Bucha. According to the report, the BND provided evidence that an airborne regiment and an army unit were initially responsible for the crimes, and that the Wagner Group later played a leading role in the atrocities. The BND said that the killings were not considered exceptional by the soldiers discussing them, and, according to sources familiar with the intercepts, the atrocities had become a standard element of Russian military activity.

Ukrainian activists said that the 64th Motor Rifle Brigade under the command of Lt. Col. Azatbek Omurbekov, a part of the Eastern Military District's 35th Army, was occupying Bucha when the atrocities took place. Various Ukrainian groups used open-source intelligence to identify the 64th as part of the occupation forces in an effort to track down those responsible. Ukrayinska Pravda, quoting the Ukrainian Intelligence Directorate, said that the 64th was pulled out of the area, with the intention of returning to Ukraine, to the Kharkiv front. In addition, two units of Kadyrovite Chechens, one from the Special Rapid Response Force (SOBR) and a paramilitary riot-control force known as OMON, were involved in the military occupation of Bucha and nearby villages. On 19 May 2022, The New York Times reported that documents recovered where Ukrainian men were executed belonged to the 104th Guards Air Assault Regiment and the 234th Guards Air Assault Regiment. An investigation by the Associated Press revealed that the 76th Guards Air Assault Division was running the Russian occupation headquarters at the 144 Yablunska street from where the cleansing operation of Bucha was coordinated. Ukrainian prosecutors are pursuing the commander, Maj. Gen. Sergei Chubarykin, and his boss, Col. Gen. Alexander Chaiko, for their responsibility for the operation.

== Investigations ==
=== Ukraine ===
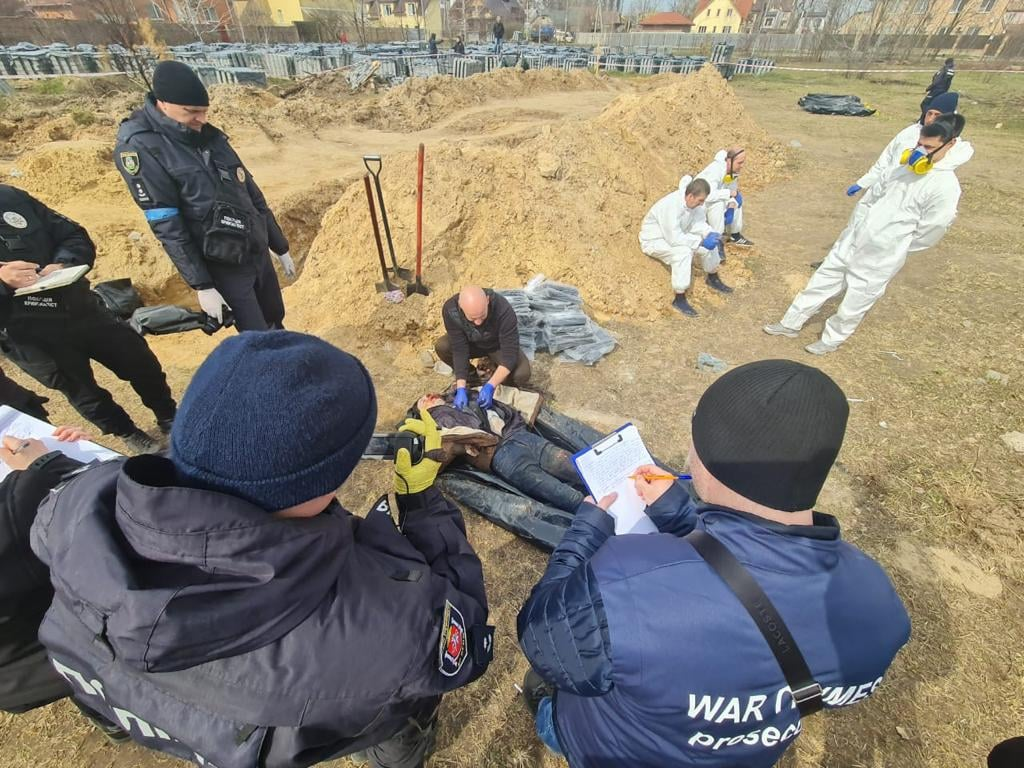
Exhumation of victims of a Bucha mass grave

The foreign ministry requested that the International Criminal Court investigation in Ukraine send investigators to Bucha and other areas of Kyiv Oblast. Foreign Minister Dmytro Kuleba also called on other international groups to collect evidence.

=== Russia ===
Russia requested a special meeting of the United Nations Security Council, of which it is one of five permanent members, to address what it called a "heinous provocation of Ukrainian radicals", the footage of dead bodies in Bucha, which it said was staged. Alexander Bastrykin, head of the Investigative Committee of Russia, ordered an investigation into what he labelled a "Ukrainian provocation", accusing Ukrainian authorities of spreading "deliberately false information" about the actions of the Russian armed forces.

=== Amnesty International ===
On 6 May 2022, Amnesty International published the results of their investigation of the massacre. It concluded that Russian forces were guilty of unlawful attacks and willful killings of civilians in Bucha, Andriivka, Zdvyzhivka and Vorzel. In Bucha alone, 22 different cases of killings by Russian forces were confirmed. Amnesty International called on the International Criminal Court to bring the perpetrators to justice:

All those responsible for war crimes should be held criminally responsible for their actions. Under the doctrine of command responsibility, hierarchal superiors—including commanders and civilian leaders, such as ministers and heads of state—who knew or had reason to know about war crimes committed by their forces, but did not attempt to stop them or punish those responsible, should also be held criminally responsible.

=== Human Rights Watch ===
Human Rights Watch released a report confirming that the evidence leads to the conclusion of summary executions, unlawful killings, enforced disappearances and torture in Bucha perpetrated by Russian forces, which could constitute war crimes and crimes against humanity.

=== The New York Times ===
On 22 December 2022, The New York Times published the results of their investigation of the massacre. The eight-month visual investigation by the paper concluded that the perpetrators of the massacre along Yablunska Street were Russian paratroopers from the 234th Air Assault Regiment (part of 76th Guards Air Assault Division) led by Lt. Col. Artyom Gorodilov.

== Reactions ==
=== Ukraine ===
A speech by President Volodymyr Zelenskyy addressing the massacre

Foreign Minister Dmytro Kuleba described the events as a "deliberate massacre". He said Russia was "worse than ISIS" and that Russian forces were guilty of murder, torture, rape and looting. Kuleba also urged the G7 countries to impose "devastating" additional sanctions.

In an interview with Bild, Mayor of Kyiv Vitali Klitschko said that "what happened in Bucha and other suburbs of Kyiv can only be described as genocide" and accused Russian President Vladimir Putin of war crimes. Ukrainian President Volodymyr Zelenskyy visited the area on 4 April 2022, to see for himself the reported atrocities in Bucha.

Speaking to the United Nations Security Council on 5 April, Zelenskyy said that the massacre was "unfortunately only one example of what the occupiers have been doing on our territory for the past 41 days", and that "Russian tanks had crushed people 'for pleasure'". He called for Russia to be held accountable for the actions of its military, and lose its position on the Security Council.

On 14 April 2022, Verkhovna Rada recognised Russia's actions in Ukraine as genocide, and cited the massacre as an example.

=== International organisations ===
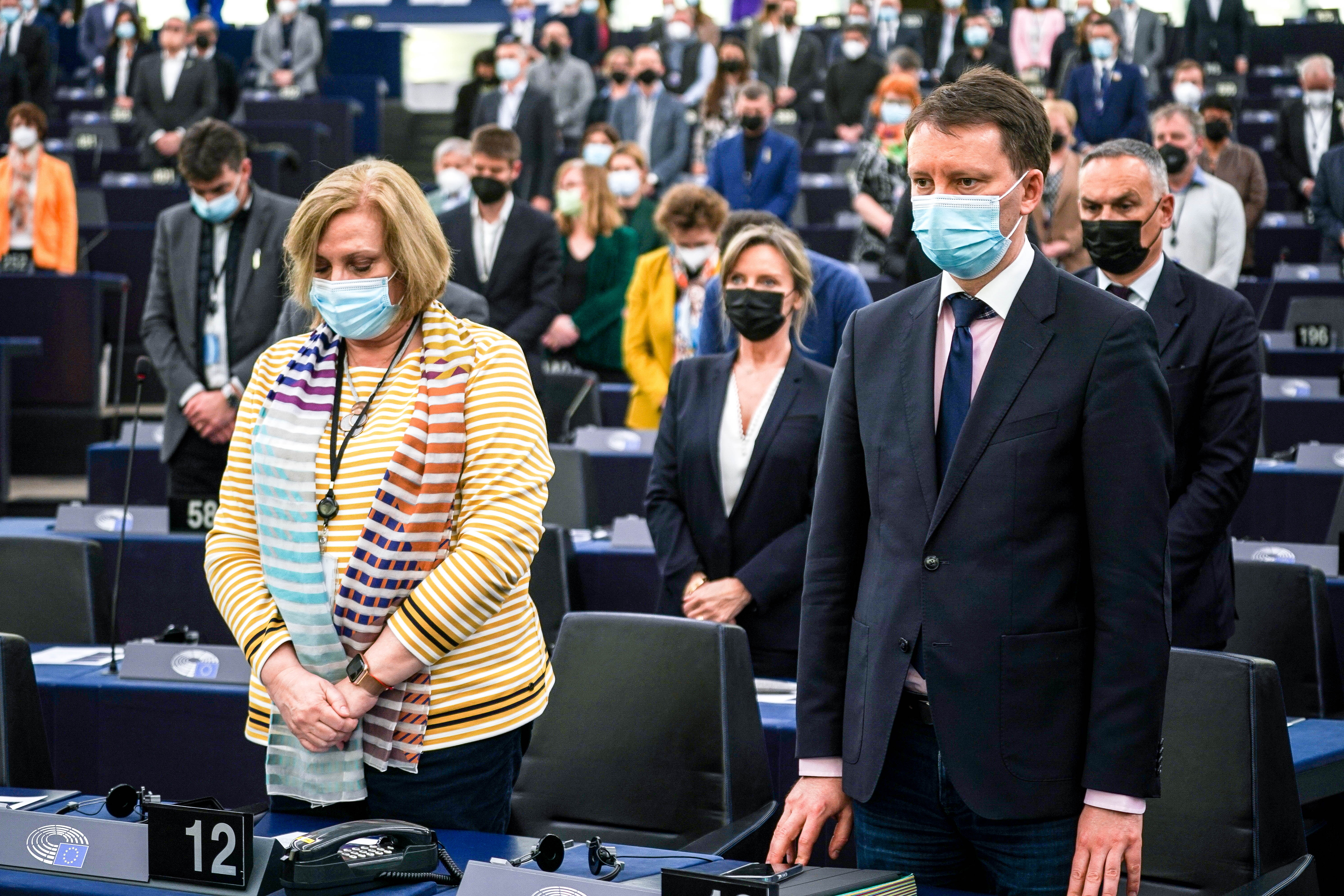
The European Parliament observes a minute of silence for the victims of the Ukraine war, with the Bucha massacre specifically mentioned, 4 April 2022

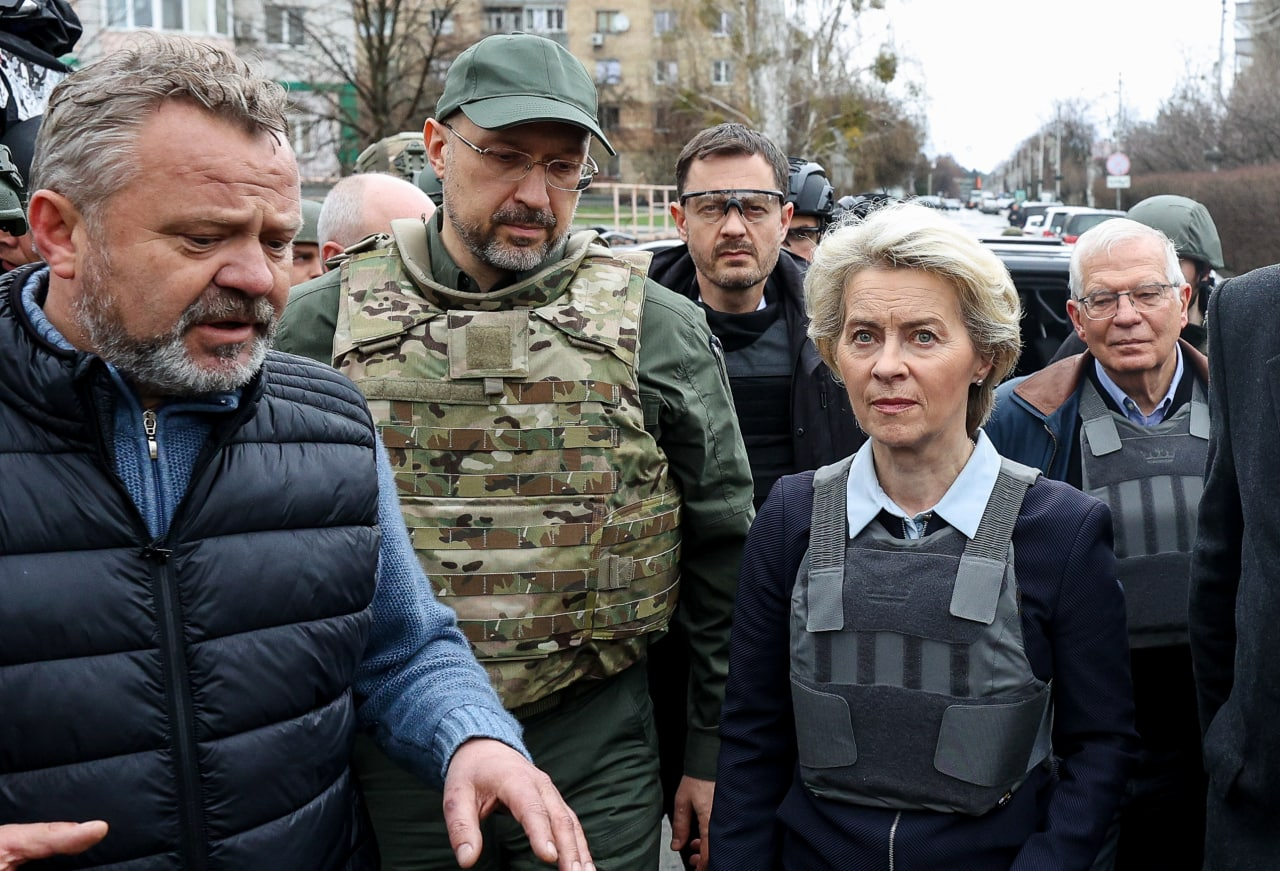
European Union president Ursula von der Leyen and other EU and Ukrainian officials visiting Bucha after the massacre, 8 April 2022

The massacre was condemned by the president of the European Council, Charles Michel, who said he was "shocked by haunting images of atrocities committed by [the] Russian army in Kyiv" and promised the EU would assist Ukraine and human rights groups in collecting evidence for use in international courts. NATO Secretary General Jens Stoltenberg similarly expressed his horror at the targeting of civilians.

United Nations Secretary-General António Guterres expressed his shock at the images and called for an independent investigation that would ensure accountability. The UN Security Council convened on 5 April to discuss the situation, including a video address from President Zelenskyy.

On 7 April, the United States initiated a resolution at the emergency special session of the UN General Assembly to suspend Russia from the Human Rights Council, the UN's leading human rights body. The resolution passed, with 93 countries voting for the proposal, 24 against, and 58 abstaining. Russia is the second country to have its membership rights revoked at the council, after Libya in 2011, and the only permanent member of the Security Council to have its rights revoked.

Foreign ministers from the G7 issued a joint statement condemning the "atrocities" committed by Russia in Bucha and other parts of Ukraine.

European Commission President Ursula von der Leyen visited Bucha on 8 April, viewing mass graves and describing the massacre as "the cruel face of Putin's army". Von der Leyen later visited Kyiv and met with Zelenskyy, presenting Zelenskyy with paperwork to begin the process of Ukraine's accession to the European Union and offering to fast-track Ukraine's application.

=== Other countries ===
Leaders of neighbouring European countries condemned the attack and called for investigations into the atrocities. Estonian Prime Minister Kaja Kallas compared the images of the event to those of mass killings committed by the Soviet Union and Nazi Germany, and called for details to be gathered and perpetrators brought to court, while Slovak Prime Minister Eduard Heger compared the massacre with the "apocalypse of war in former Yugoslavia". Moldovan President Maia Sandu called the event "crimes against humanity" and declared 4 April 2022 a day of national mourning in memory of all Ukrainians killed in the Russo-Ukrainian war. Amongst Ukraine and Russia's other neighbours, such condemnations were also expressed by political leaders in Finland, Lithuania, Poland, and Turkey.

These events led to numerous European Union members—including Denmark, Estonia, France, Germany, Greece, Italy, Latvia, Lithuania, Portugal, Romania, Slovenia, Spain and Sweden—ordering the expulsion of more than 200 Russian diplomats from their countries. Such expulsions were also effected by Japan.

Several Chinese state media outlets highlighted claims from Russia that Ukraine staged the incident, repeated Russian claims against responsibility, and claimed the United States was responsible for the war. Representatives of China and India to the UN Security Council described the reports as "deeply disturbing" and backed calls for international investigations. In China, such reactions were also echoed at a press briefing by the Ministry of Foreign Affairs, although blame for the incident was not directly attributed to any of the involved actors. This refusal to assign blame was followed by the repetition in Chinese state media of Russian claims disputing the veracity of the events. Putin's ally, Belarusian president Alexander Lukashenko, also called the Bucha massacre a "false flag attack" and a "'psychological operation' orchestrated by British operatives in order to introduce new sanctions against Russia", and purportedly gave Putin documents relating to these allegations. The Cuban state newspaper Granma also claimed that the incident was staged, reporting that the images from Bucha "distort reality and give the world an unreal version of what happened, after the abandonment of Russian troops", while Telesur, owned and operated by the governments of Cuba, Nicaragua and Venezuela, described the massacre as "a fake news story".

U.S. President Joe Biden called for Putin to be tried for war crimes. Biden also stated that he supported additional sanctions on Russia. A similar sentiment was shared by British prime minister Boris Johnson, who said that economic sanctions against Russia and military support for Ukraine would be stepped up as a result.

French President Emmanuel Macron described the actions of the Russian military as amounting to war crimes and that new sanctions were necessary in response. Macron suggested targeting the Russian oil and coal industries. Subsequently, the European Union announced additional sanctions against Russia, including a ban on imports of coal, wood, rubber, cement, fertilisers and other products from Russia. The ban on coal imports was expected to cost Russia €8 billion annually. The additional sanctions also included export bans on high-tech equipment and technology from Europe. In announcing the sanctions, European Commission vice president Josep Borrell stated that they were adopted "following the atrocities committed by Russian armed forces in Bucha".

== Russian response and denial ==
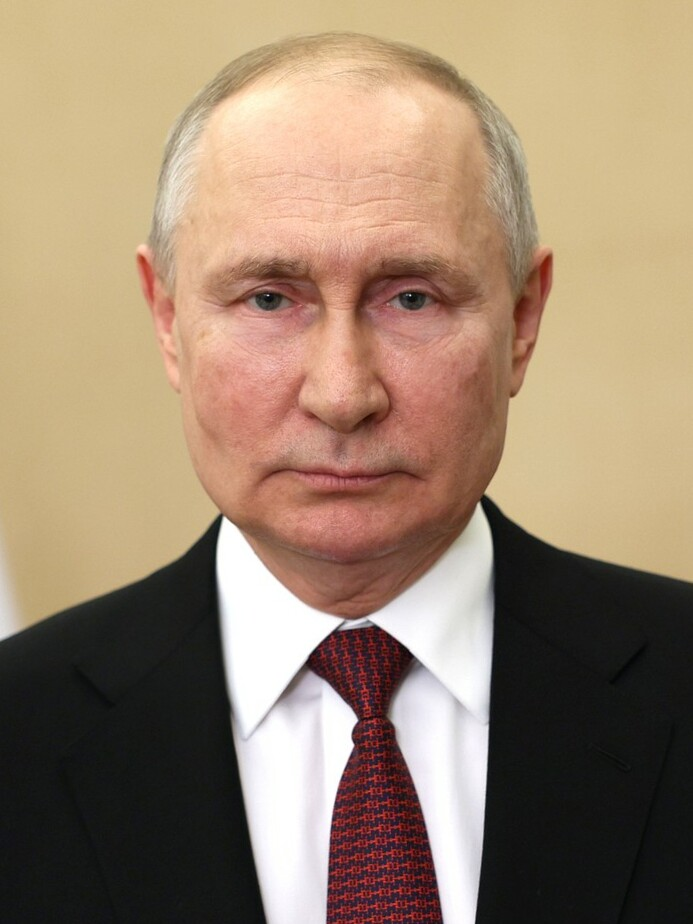
Russian President Vladimir Putin denied that Russian troops were responsible for the massacre of civilians in Bucha.

Russian Foreign Minister Sergey Lavrov called the massacre a "fake attack" used against Russia, claiming it had been staged. He said that Russian forces had left Bucha on 30 March while evidence of killings had emerged, according to him, four days later, following the arrival in Bucha of the Ukrainian security service, and claimed that on 31 March Bucha's Mayor Anatoly Fedoruk had released a video message stating that the Russian army had left the city without mentioning any locals shot in the streets. The Associated Press reported that Mayor Fedoruk did give his account about "dead bodies piling up in Bucha" on 7 March.

On 4 April, at the United Nations, the Russian representative Vasily Nebenzya said that the bodies in the videos were not there before the Russian forces withdrew from Bucha. This was contradicted by satellite images that showed that the bodies were there as early as 19 March; the position of the corpses in the satellite images matched the smartphone photos taken in early April. He said that the Western media "suppressed all objective facts and evidence and disseminated blatant fakes instead" and that the report published by The Guardian proved that the Ukrainian army was responsible for the killings.

External videos
- Satellite imagery analysis published by The New York Times

Russian claims that the bodies had been "staged" by the Ukrainian side after the withdrawal of Russian troops were contradicted by satellite images from mid-March that were provided by Maxar Technologies to The New York Times. The images of Yablonska Street show at least 11 "dark objects of similar size to a human body" appearing between 9 and 11 March. They appeared in precisely the same positions as bodies later filmed by a local council member on 1 April, after Ukrainian forces had reclaimed the city. A video of the same street shows three bodies, near bicycles and abandoned cars, that first appeared between 20 and 21 March according to satellite imagery. The Times concluded, on 4 April, that "many of the civilians were killed more than three weeks ago, when Russia's military was in control of the town" and that the images refute Russian claims of the contrary. BBC News came to the same conclusion. The satellite images also showed the first signs of excavations for a mass grave in Bucha on 10 March. By 31 March, it had been expanded into an "approximately 45-foot-long (14 m) trench in the southwestern section of the area near the church".

The Russian Defence Ministry's Telegram channel reposted a report stating Russian forces had not targeted civilians during the battle. According to the statement, a massacre could not have been covered up by the Russian military, and the mass grave in the city was filled with victims of Ukrainian airstrikes. The ministry said it had analysed a video purporting to show the bodies of dead civilians in Bucha, and said the corpses filmed were moving. This claim was investigated by the BBC's Moscow Department, which concluded there was no evidence the video had been staged. Russia also released a video that, according to the Kremlin, showed a corpse supposedly moving, although this was quickly deemed false after investigations by fact-checking websites determined that it was a corpse reflected in the rearview mirror of a car.

Netherlands-based investigative journalism group Bellingcat favourably cited the BBC's account and further put into question the timeline presented by Russian government sources. In particular, Bellingcat journalist and founder Eliot Higgins noted that both the Russian media outlet TV Zvezda and the secretary of the Bucha City Council Taras Shapravsky reported that Russian forces were still present in Bucha at least as late as 1 April.

Another attempt to depict the incident as a fake aired on the Russian state television channel Russia-24, using a video that the channel claimed showed Ukrainians arranging mannequins in order to "stage" the Bucha massacre. The footage was quickly identified as coming from a television set filmed in Saint Petersburg. Workers for the television show confirmed that the video was from a Russian television show. Similarly, a video showing Ukrainian soldiers pulling dead bodies with cables in Bucha was widely shared by pro-Russian social media, supposedly to prove that the scene was staged. The provenance of the video is the Associated Press; its report explains that the use of cables was due to concern of the dead bodies being possibly booby-trapped. Videos showing Ukrainian forces searching for explosives under the corpses, falsely claiming they were placing the bodies to fake the massacre, were also shared in social media. Adrien Bocquet, a French journalist who applied for Russian citizenship and was given awards by the Kremlin, blamed Ukrainian forces for the massacre. Many of his assertions were proven false by fact-checkers, who showed that he had even photoshopped pictures to support his representation of events, that he had changed his story several times, and that the dates of his trip did not match his narrative.

President Putin and Belarusian President Lukashenko called the mass killing of civilians in Bucha "fake".

Associate professor from Lund University Tomas Sniegon, writing for The Conversation, described Russia's approach to Bucha as similar as the Soviet Union's denial of the Katyn massacre, where Soviet troops covered up the execution of thousands of Poles, insisting the massacre had been done by the Wehrmacht. Comparisons between the two events were also made by The Asahi Shimbun and Prime Minister of Slovenia Janez Janša.

=== Censorship in Russia ===
Russian journalist Ilya Krasilshchik, former publisher of the independent news site Meduza, was charged under Russia's 2022 war censorship laws for condemning the Russian military for the Bucha massacre. In June 2023, he was sentenced in absentia to 8 years in prison.

Russian television presenter and singer Maxim Galkin accused the Russian authorities of hypocrisy and lies regarding war crimes committed by Russian soldiers in Bucha.

On 9 December 2022, a Moscow court sentenced Russian opposition politician Ilya Yashin to eight years and six months imprisonment for his statements about the circumstances of the killings in Bucha, on charges of "spreading false information" about the armed forces. Yashin condemned the killings and said that Russian forces in Ukraine were responsible for the massacre. His punishment was the harshest given under the new laws that criminalise spreading "false" information about the armed forces.

Russian authorities opened a criminal case against Russian-American journalist Masha Gessen on charges of spreading "false information" about the Russian army's actions in Ukraine. Gessen was accused of spreading "false information" after talking about the Bucha massacre during an interview with Russian journalist Yury Dud.

On 6 March 2024, Russian journalist Roman Ivanov was sentenced to 7 years in prison for social media posts about the Bucha massacre and other war crimes of the Russian army. In April 2024, Forbes Russia journalist Sergey Mingazov was arrested for "reposting a publication about the events in Bucha" on Telegram.

On 5 June 2024, the Ostankinsky District Court sentenced Russian streamer Anna Bazhutova to five and a half years in prison on charges of spreading "false information" about the Russian military. Bazhutova made a live stream on Twitch that included testimonies of the massacre and residents back in April 2022.

=== Social media comments ===
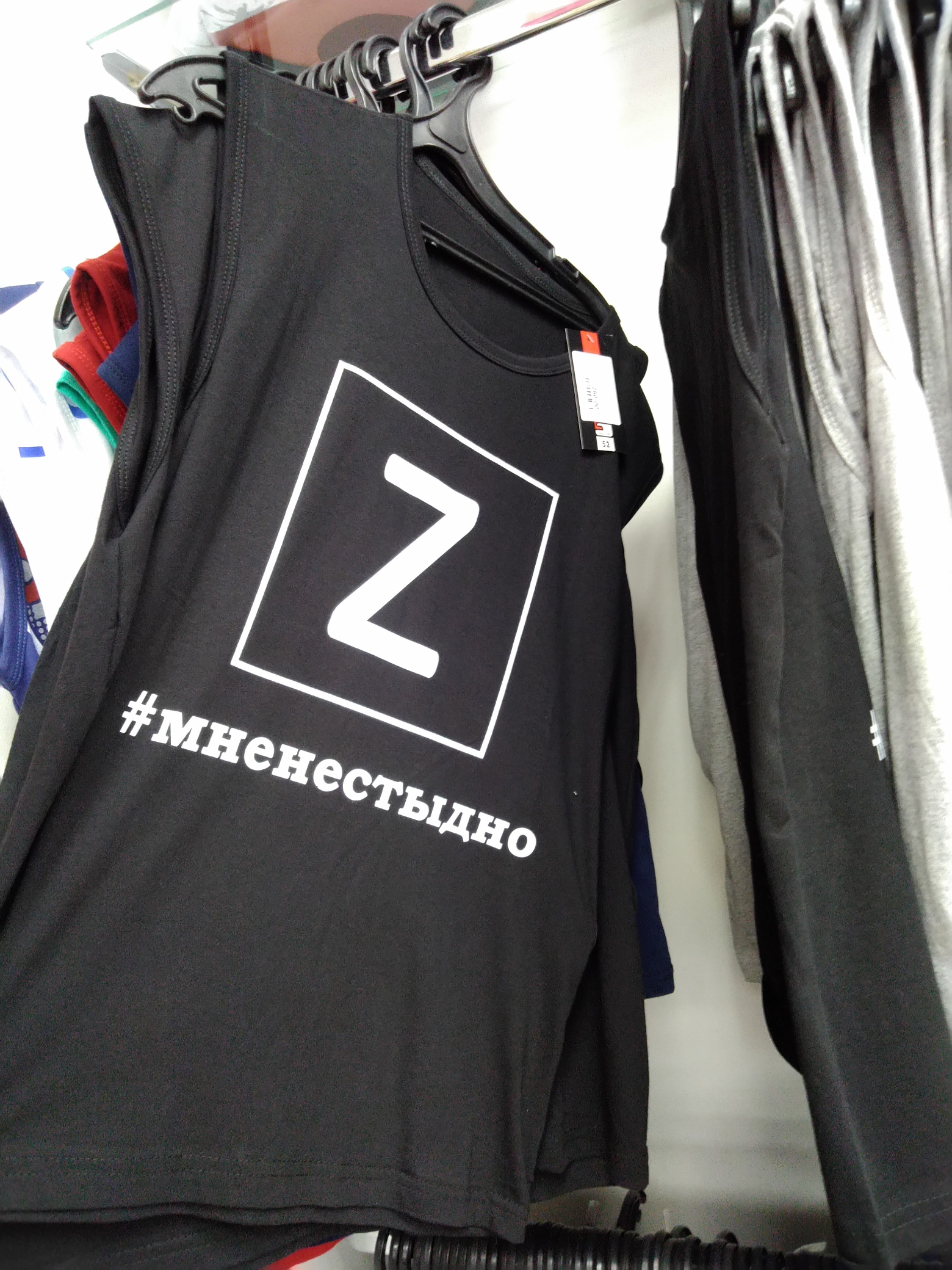
A shirt with a Z-shaped symbol that reads "I'm not ashamed" (Russian: #мненестыдно)

An analysis of three Russian nationalist Telegram channels, with tens of thousands of subscribers responding to the news of the massacre, reported that 144 comments—almost half—of those made within the first 48 hours demanded that Russian forces act even more violently. Many of the comments included ethnically motivated calls for violence against Ukrainians, many of them advocating genocide. According to the study, "messages combined religious references with extreme homophobia, overt racism, calls for violence and descriptions of the Ukrainian other as diseased". Between the time when the news of the massacre broke and late April, the comments in the nationalist Telegram channels became even more extreme in their calls for more sadistic violence from Russian troops, including exhortations to mass rape, prostituting of Ukrainian POWs and mass murder. Popular Odesa-born Russian "activist-journalist", and moderator of one of the channels, Yuliya Vityazeva, compared Ukrainian defenders of Mariupol to "cockroaches" and stated that gassing them was unnecessary since there were "simpler and cheaper" ways to murder them, a type of comment that resembled narratives observed in the run up to the Rwandan genocide.

The Telegram channels have also been used to sell t-shirts with the letters "V" and "Z" and the slogan "Slaughter in Bucha: We Can Do It Again."

== See also ==
- Babi Yar
- Allegations of genocide of Ukrainians in the Russo-Ukrainian war
- Izium mass graves
- List of massacres in Ukraine
- Novye Aldi massacre
- Sexual violence in the Russian invasion of Ukraine (2022–present)
- State terrorism
