= Denis Shishov =

Russian major general (born 1981)

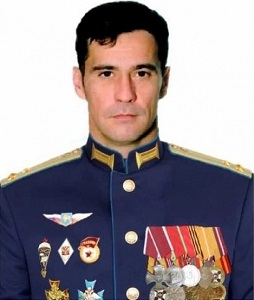
- Born: 1981 (age 44–45); Buryat ASSR, Russian SFSR, Soviet Union
- Education: Ryazan Guards Higher Airborne Command School; Combined Arms Academy of the Armed Forces of the Russian Federation
- Military career
- Allegiance: Russia
- Branch: Russian Airborne Forces
- Service years: 2003–present
- Rank: Major General
- Commands: 76th Guards Air Assault Division; 11th Guards Air Assault Brigade; 104th Guards Air Assault Regiment
- Conflicts: Russo-Ukrainian war; Southern Ukraine offensive
- Awards: Hero of the Russian Federation; Order of Courage (2)

Major General Denis Nikolayevich Shishov (Note: Russian: Денис Николаевич Шишов) (born 1981) is a Russian Airborne Forces officer who has been the commanding officer of the 76th Guards Air Assault Division since April 2022. He was awarded the title Hero of the Russian Federation in February 2022.

== Early life and education ==
Shishov was born to a military family in 1981, in the Buryat Autonomous Soviet Socialist Republic. His father was in the Soviet Airborne Forces and a served in the Soviet–Afghan War. Shishov later lived in Kostroma, where he completed his secondary education in 1998 before entering the Ryazan Guards Higher Airborne Command School that same year. He graduated in 2003 and was commissioned as a lieutenant.

== Military career ==
Between 2003 and 2015 Shishov served in the 104th Guards Air Assault Regiment of the 76th Guards Air Assault Division, and from 2015 to 2017 he was the regiment's commander. At some point he attended and graduated from the Combined Arms Academy of the Armed Forces of the Russian Federation. Promoted to colonel in 2017, he was deputy commander of the 98th Guards Airborne Division until 2020, when he was appointed commander of the 11th Guards Air Assault Brigade.

At the start of the Russian invasion of Ukraine in February 2022, Shishov commanded the 11th Guards Air Assault Brigade during its attack into Kherson Oblast. The brigade landed near Kakhovka along the Dnieper river and was tasked with holding its position until backup arrived. They did this while only having infantry fighting vehicles to defend from Ukrainian armored and artillery attacks. His deputy commander was killed and Shishov was injured in the head during the fighting, on 26 February. Despite this he continued to lead the unit and they successfully fought off seven attacks from the Ukrainian forces. He later was awarded the title Hero of the Russian Federation. In the successful air assault, the 11th Guards Brigade captured the Kakhovka Dam and bridge.

On 18 April 2022 Shishov was made commander of the 76th Guards Air Assault Division. In the fall of 2022, the 76th Guards Division halted the advance of Ukrainian marines in the Beryslav area of Kherson Oblast. On 6 December 2023 he was promoted to major general. In March 2024, Colonel Abdulaziz Shikhabirov was appointed as division commander, but he was reportedly killed in May 2025. Shishov was reportedly again the commander of the 76th division as of June 2025.

== Awards and decorations ==
- Hero of the Russian Federation
- Order of Courage (x2)
- Zhukov Medal
- Suvorov Medal
- Other medals

== Personal life ==
In June 2025, he married Sofia, the daughter of Andrey Turchak, the head of Russia's Altai Republic.

== Notes ==
Military offices
Preceded by Andrey Stesyev	Commander of the 104th Guards Air Assault Regiment; 2015–2017	Succeeded by Vitaly Repin
Preceded by Ruslan Yevkodimov	Commander of the 11th Guards Air Assault Brigade; 2020–2022	Succeeded by Zayan Bayanov
Preceded by Sergey Chubarykin	Commander of the 76th Guards Air Assault Division; 2022–2024	Succeeded by Abdulaziz Shikhabirov
Preceded by Abdulaziz Shikhabirov	Commander of the 76th Guards Air Assault Division; 2025–present	Succeeded by
