= Anna Bazhutova =

Russian streamer and political prisoner

- Анна Бажутова
- Born: c. 1993
- Other name: YokoBovich
- Occupation: Streamer

Anna Bazhutova (Russian: Анна Бажутова; c. 1993), known on Twitch as YokoBovich, is a Russian streamer. Bazhutova was arrested in 2023 and subsequently sentenced to five and a half years in prison for sharing testimonies of the Bucha massacre in Ukraine on her Twitch channel. The Memorial human rights organization has classified her as a political prisoner.

== Detention ==
In April 2022, Bazhutova made a live stream on Twitch that included witnesses to the Bucha massacre, which occurred during the Russian invasion of Ukraine, and residents of the city. In June 2023, pro-war Russian bloggers republished the stream and filed complaints with the police. Two months after the complaint, police searched Buzhutova's home and confiscated her personal electronic devices.

On 5 June 2024, the Ostankinsky District Court found Anna guilty of “spreading false information” about the Russian military and sentenced her to five and a half years in prison. Bazhutova's defense stated that it would appeal the decision. The Memorial human rights organization has classified her as a political prisoner, stating that her case violates the right to freedom of expression and seeks to silence critics of the war in Russia.

== See also ==
- Bucha massacre#Censorship in Russia
