= 104th Guards Air Assault Regiment =

Russian Airborne Troops unit

The 104th Guards Airborne Assault Red Banner, Order of Kutuzov Regiment
- Russian: 104-й гвардейский десантно-штурмовой Краснознамённый, ордена Кутузова полк
- 104th Guards Airborne Assault Regiment shoulder sleeve insignia
- Active: 24 September 1948–present
- Country: Soviet Union (1948–1991); Russia (1991–present)
- Branch: Russian Airborne Forces
- Size: Regiment
- Part of: 76th Guards Air Assault Division
- Garrison/HQ: Cheryokha Pskov Oblast; MUN 32515
- Engagements: First South Ossetia War; Transnistria War; Second Chechen War; War in Donbas; Russian invasion of Ukraine
- Decorations: Order of Red Banner

The 104th Guards Air Assault Regiment is a formation of the Russian Airborne Troops. It is part of the 76th Guards Air Assault Division.

== History ==
The regiment was formed on 24 September 1948 in Valga, Karelian ASSR as the 104th Guards Air-Landing Regiment of the 21st Guards Airborne Division from elements of the 3rd Parachute Battalion of the 346th Guards Air-Landing Regiment. In September 1953, it would convert to a parachute regiment and be renamed the 104th Guards Airborne Regiment. Later, in 1955, the regiment would relocate to Cheryokha, Pskov Oblast and become a part of the 76th Guards Air Assault Division.

Operations

In 1967, the regiment was in the Exercise Dnepr, and in 1970, Exercise Dvina. In 1972, the regiment would conduct exercises beyond the arctic circle, and in 1977, it was fully armed with the BMD-1. Exercise Dvina On February 21st, 1978, it was awarded the Order of the Red Banner. From 1979 to 1989, soldiers of the regiment operated in Afghanistan. On November 26, 1979, it was awarded the pennant of the Minister of Defense of the USSR "For courage and military valor". In 1981, regiment personnel were involved in the large-scale exercise "West-81". In June 1987, General of the Army V.F. Margelov was eternally included in the list of honorary soldiers.

From 1988 to 1993, the regiment was involved in multiple peacekeeping operations across the Caucasus, and was stationed in Yerevan in 1988, Baku from 1988 to 1989, Osh, Fergana in 1990, and Transnistria and South Ossetia from 1992 to 1993. From November 1994 to May 1995, the regiment conducted military operations within Chechnya. For their courage and heroism, hundreds of regiment servicemen were awarded orders and medals, and Guards Colonel Tulin S.Z., Guards Lieutenant Colonel Pyatnitskikh S.I. (posthumously), Guards Major Urazayev I.K. were awarded the title of Hero of Russia. From August 1999 to 2004, the regiment conducted counter-terrorist operations in Chechnya, where famously the 6th Company of the 2nd Battalion fought until the last man at the Battle for Height 776.

In 2014, the regiment was involved in the War in Donbas. In 2022, the regiment participated in the Russian invasion of Ukraine. The regiment has suffered very heavy casualties including at least four battalion commanders. On 7 June 2022, Ukraine's 80th Air Assault Brigade claimed that they had destroyed the regiment in a battle on a highway in the Donbas. The regiment has been accused of participating in the Bucha massacre by Ukrainian prosecutors.

=== Organization (from 2017) ===
- regiment HQ,
- 1st airborne assault battalion,
- 2nd airborne assault battalion,
- parachute assault battalion,
- self-propelled artillery division,
- anti-tank battery,
- anti-tank battery of self-propelled anti-tank guns,
- anti-aircraft battery,
- reconnaissance company,
- engineer-sapper company,
- communications company,
- airborne support company,
- logistics company,
- repair company,
- NBC protection platoon.
