= Vitaly Shishov =

Belarusian activist (1995–2021)

- Виталий Шишов; Віталь Шышоў
- Born: 1995; Rechytsa, Belarus
- Died: c. 3 August 2021 (aged 26); Kyiv, Ukraine
- Citizenship: Belarusian
- Occupation: Activist

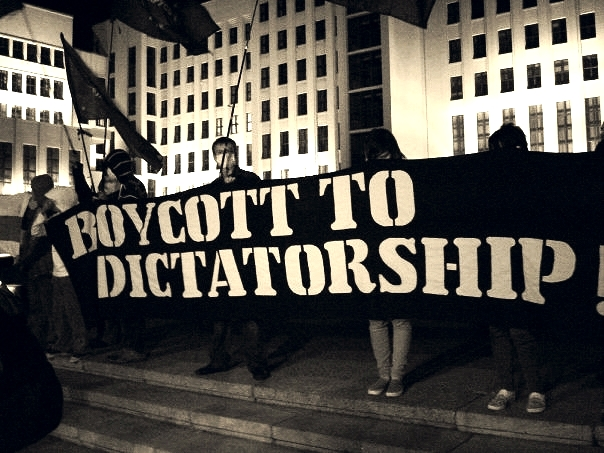
Protests after irregular parliamentary elections in Minsk, Belarus in 2008

Vitaly Vasilyevich Shishov (Russian: Виталий Васильевич Шишов; 1995 – 2/3 August 2021), or Vital Vasilyevich Shyshou (Belarusian: Віталь Васільевіч Шышоў), was a Belarusian political activist and dissident in exile, who disappeared, and was found dead in Ukraine in August 2021. He was the head of the Belarusian House in Ukraine, an organization that helps people to escape repressions following the 2020–2021 Belarusian protests. At the age of 26, Shishov went missing from his home in Kyiv and was found dead, hanging from a tree in a park near the place where he lived. His suspicious and unexpected death has raised public concerns about his possible assassination.

He is believed to have been killed by Belarusian government agents.

== Biography ==
Shishov was from the region of Gomel in Belarus, near the border with Ukraine and Russia.

Following the re-election of president Alexander Lukashenko in August 2020, who has been president of Belarus since 1994, Shishov and his girlfriend Bazhena Zholudzh decided to leave Belarus.

While living in Ukraine, Shishov was aware of the possible dangers to himself from Belarusian government reprisals. He took to photographing the license plates of cars and people who appeared suspicious whom he saw in Kyiv.

== Death ==
On 2 August 2021, Shishov put on his jogging clothes and is believed to have gone on a run.

Later that day, Vitaly was reported missing in Kyiv by his partner. By the next day, he was found hanged in Sviatoshynsky Forest Park, a park near his home. Ukrainian police opened a criminal case into his death and would investigate whether it was a suicide or "premeditative murder meant to look like suicide." The head of Ukrainian police highlighted that his body has been found with abrasions and peeled skin in several places.

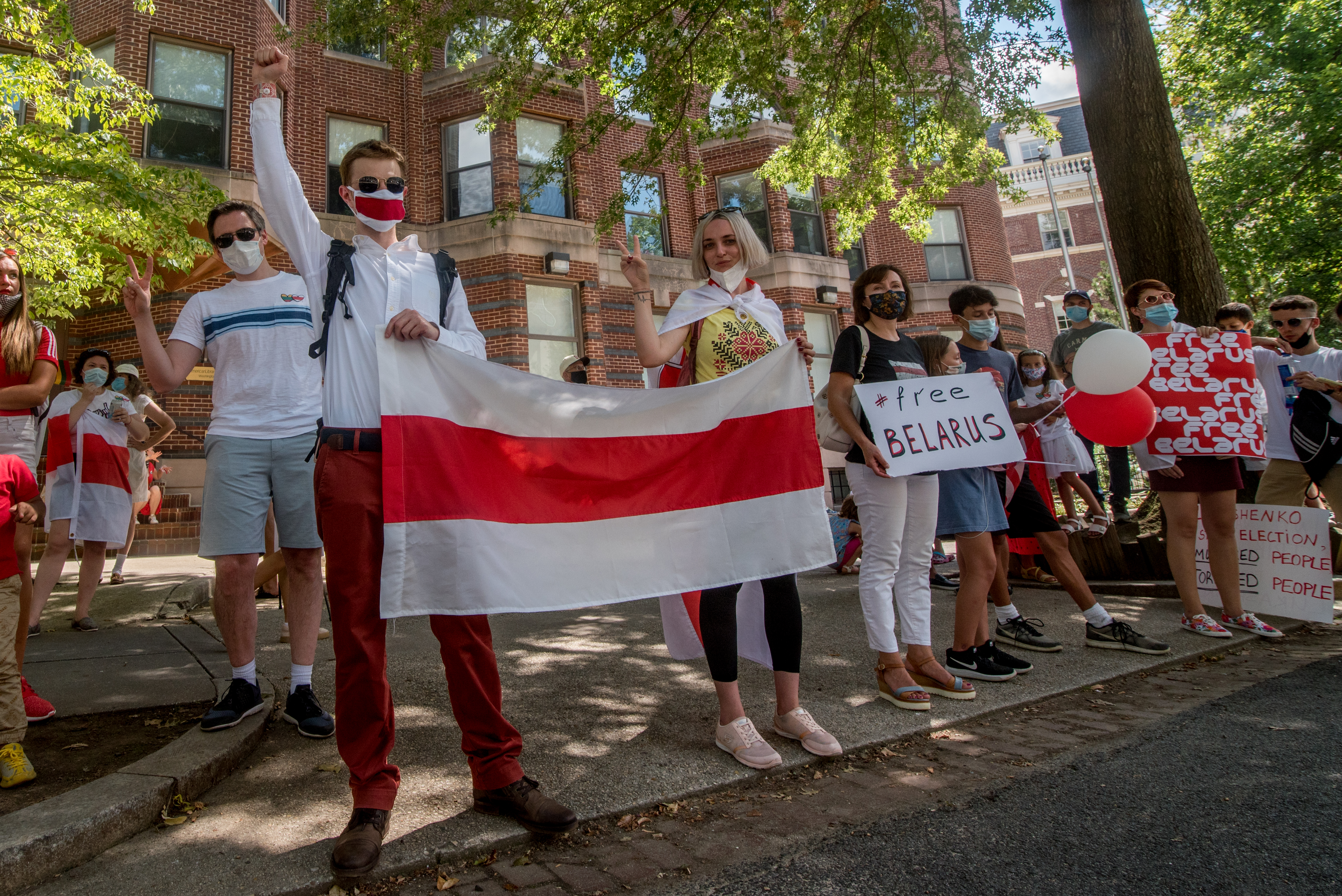
Democracy protest at the Embassy of Belarus, Washington, DC in August 2020

A week prior to his death, Shishov helped organize a rally in Kyiv that marked the 31st anniversary of Belarus's independence from the Soviet Union. Shishov, as well as the Belarusian House in Ukraine (BHU), had received threats. His colleague Yuri Shchuchko stated that Ukrainian security officers and police had privately warned the BHU about threats to activists: "They said we should watch ourselves because a Belarusian KGB [secret police] network was active here." BHU stated that "[they] were warned repeatedly by local sources and our people in Belarus about possible provocations, going as far as kidnapping and assassination. Vitaly reacted to those warnings with stoicism and humour."

A similar lynching incident occurred a year before. In 2020 in Belarus, the 28-year-old democracy activist Nikita Krivtsov was found hanging from a tree in a forest outside Minsk. Shishov was buried on September 26, 2021, in Kyiv.

Following Shishov's death, Volodymyr Zelenskyy, the president of Ukraine, ordered law enforcement agencies to more closely protect Belarusian exiles.

In an 9 August press conference, President Lukashenko denied that Belarusian security services had killed Shishov, calling the activist "a nobody."

== See also ==
- List of solved missing person cases (post-2000)
