= 21st Guards Airborne Division =

Soviet Union military unit

- Active: 1948–1955
- Country: Soviet Union
- Branch: Soviet airborne
- Type: Airborne
- Size: Division
- Part of: 15th Guards Airborne Corps
- Garrison/HQ: Valga
- Decorations: Order of Alexander Nevsky

The 21st Guards Airborne Division was an airborne division of the Soviet airborne from 1948 to 1955. It was based in Valga and was formed from a regiment of the 104th Guards Airborne Division. It was disbanded in 1955, with two regiments being transferred to the 104th Guards Airborne Division and 76th Guards Airborne Division.

== History ==
The division was activated on 15 October 1948 in Valga in Estonia from the 346th Guards Airlanding Regiment of the 104th Guards Airborne Division, inheriting the Order of Alexander Nevsky from the regiment. The division was part of the 15th Guards Airborne Corps. It included the 97th Guards Airborne Regiment, 104th Guards Airlanding Regiment and 1293rd Guards Artillery Regiment. In 1949, the Separate Landing Security Company was disbanded. At some point the 104th Guards Airlanding Regiment became an airborne regiment, having previously been a glider-borne regiment. On 15 November 1953, the division was reorganized. The Separate Communications Company became the Separate Guards Communications Battalion. On the same day, the Separate Medical & Sanitary company became a battalion while the Separate Guards Antitank Artillery Battalion and Separate Guards Reconnaissance Company were disbanded. On 25 April 1955, the division was disbanded. Its 97th Guards Airborne Regiment was transferred to the 104th Guards Airborne Division and its 104th Guards Airborne Regiment was transferred to the 76th Guards Airborne Division.
