= Anatoliy Dimarov =

Ukrainian writer (1922–2014)

Anatoliy Dimarov (born Anatoly Andronikovych Harasyuta on May 17, 1922, in Haratsky, Poltava Oblast – June 29, 2014, Kyiv, Ukraine) was a Ukrainian writer. He was awarded the 1981 Shevchenko Prize in literature for the second volume of the novel Pain & Anger (Volume 1: 1974; Volume 2: 1980).

== Early life ==
Born on May 17, 1922, in the village of Garasky (Garasyuty) in the Shishachchyna region of Poltava region. His father, Andronicus Fedorovich Garasyuta, was married to a priest's daughter and was later declared a Kulak. Mr. Dimarov later said "My path to the world was completely closed to me. And my unfortunate holy mother for the sake of us, two children, gave up her personal life. She went to Myrhorod, found her friends with whom she studied at the gymnasium, and begged them to testify in the Myrhorod court that she had lost her children's metrics and that we were the children of teacher Dimarov, who died. Since then, I became Dimarov, not Garasyuta, - the writer later said. "I couldn't go anywhere, not even to the Komsomol, I was afraid that they would start studying my biography and find out that I was the son of a kulak." As a child, Anatoliy survived the Holodomor in Ukraine in 1932-1933. After graduating from high school in 1940, he was drafted into the army. At the beginning of World War II he fought in the 371st Rifle Regiment of the 130th Rifle Division on the Southwestern Front. Near Mogilev on July 17, 1941, was seriously injured in the year, after treatment he found himself in the occupied territories. He became the commander of a partisan detachment, had several injuries and contusions, and became disabled at a young age. He was awarded orders and medals. In 1944 he came to Lutsk, where he lived for six years. And it was there, as the writer admitted, that the national consciousness awoke in him. "It never occurred to me that I was Ukrainian!"

== Career and Success ==
In the postwar years he worked for the newspaper "Soviet Volyn". In 1949 he published the first collection of short stories "Guests from Volhynia"; later, after graduation, Dimarov will publish a number of collections of short stories. From 1950 to 1951, Anatoly Dimarov studied at the Maxim Gorky Literary Institute in Moscow, later transferred and graduated from the Lviv Pedagogical Institute in 1951-1953. After graduating, he worked as an editor in Ukrainian publishing houses. He worked as an editor in the newspapers "Soviet Ukraine", "Soviet Volyn", worked as editor in chief of the Lviv regional publishing house "Soviet Writer". Dimarov' s first novels appeared in the late 1950s, and in the following years he published a whole galaxy of successful novels, including "His Family" (1956), "Idol" (1961), "And there will be people" (three books, 1964, 1966, 1968) and Pain and Anger (two books, 1974, 1980), etc. For the second volume of "Pain and Anger" Dimarov was awarded the Shevchenko Prize. In his works, the writer was not afraid to depict the times of forced collectivization, the Holodomor of 1932-1933, and mass repression — segments of history that were severely taboo. But the editors and the censors worked skillfully: they crossed out whole paragraphs, cut off the story lines and deleted a few chapters. The novelist's books have been translated into Russian, English, French and many other foreign languages. For 65 years, Anatoliy Dimarov was a member of the Writers' Union of Ukraine, elected a member of the council and a member of the Presidium of the National Union of Writers of Ukraine. His work has been praised for high literary awards and government awards.

=== Republishing ===
Only in 2004 Dimarov managed to republish the novel Pain and Anger in its original form in the Kyiv publishing house Ukraine, and in 2006 in the original version the novel And there will be people in the Kyiv publishing house Phoenix was republished. This is the first complete edition of both novels to return chapters deleted by Russian-Soviet censors.

==== The Mystery of the Black Crow ====
The novel "The Black Crow" is based on a true story from the life of Ukrainian Hryhoriy Nudha, a former Kolyma prisoner with whom Anatoliy Dimarov befriended in Lviv. Anatoly Dimarov recalled that he had been writing the novel for only a month and with "an indescribable feeling of free, unfettered fear of flight." The novel itself was written in the 1960s, but due to various circumstances it was published only in the late 1980s. When Dimarov finished writing the novel The Black Crow in the 1960s, he was convinced that the novel, in which he portrayed the courageous Grigory Nudga in the image of Junior Lieutenant Kalinka, would be published in both Kyiv and Moscow in Russian translation in the magazine. The printing of the novel "Black Crow" has already been approved and typed for publication in the magazine "Fatherland", the author even read the pages, and positive reviews of the manuscript of the novel were written by M. Ignatenko and P. Zagrebelny. However, due to censorship, the novel was never published in the "Fatherland", all that was published is a small excerpt in 1962 in "Literary Ukraine", which was published through the lobbying of Pavel Zagrebelny. For more than twenty years this novel lay on the desk and only after more than twenty years in the drawer, in 1989 in Melbourne the novel "Incombustible Bump", already called "Black Crow", was published in English translated by Yuri Tkach in the collection In Stalin's Shadow (Melbourne, 1989). And only a year after its publication in English, the novel finally appeared in Ukrainian in 1990, when a version of the Australian collection was published by the Kyiv publishing house Dnipro in its own collection In the Shadows of Stalin published in the series Novels and Tales.

== Awards and honours ==
1982- Shevchenko Prize for the Second Part of " Pain and Anger" 2006- Order of Prince Yaroslav the Wise V Degree for "Significant personal contribution to the development of Ukrainian literature, many years of fruitful creative work and active public activity". 2012- Order of Prince Yaroslav the Wise IV Degree for significant personal contribution to the development of national literature, significant creative achievements, many years of fruitful work. Dimarov refused the award, stating "The writer must be in opposition to any government, whatever it may be. And take the government award as an attempt to bribe him. Moreover, I cannot accept this award from the hands of people who are pushing my Ukraine into the abyss" 2012- Order of Christ the Saviour

== Death and Memorial ==
Mr. Dimarov died on 29 June 2014 at Kyiv, Ukraine. He was buried at Kiev's Baikovo Cemetery.

=== Memorial ===
In November 2016, as part of the 83rd anniversary of the Holodomor in Ukraine, the Ukrainian Institute of National Remembrance included his name in the Unbreakable Project as a celebration at the state level of 15 prominent people who went through the terrible years of 1932-1933 and were able to realize themselves.
