= 76th Guards Air Assault Division =

Division of the Russian Airborne Forces

76th Guards Air Assault Division (2006–present) 76th Guards Airborne Division (1946–2006) 76th Guards Rifle Division (1943–1946) 157th Rifle Division (1939–1943)
- Russian: 76-я гвардейская десантно-штурмовая Черниговская Краснознаменная, ордена Суворова дивизия
- Great emblem of the 76th Guards Air Assault Division
- Active: 1 September 1939 – present
- Country: Soviet Union (1939–1991); Russia (1991–present)
- Branch: Russian Airborne Forces
- Type: Airborne forces
- Role: Light Infantry; Airborne Infantry; Airmobile infantry
- Part of: Russian Armed Forces
- Garrison/HQ: Pskov, MUN 07264
- Nickname: Псковские десантники (Pskov Paratroopers)
- Mottos: Мы всюду там, где ждут победу! (We are everywhere where victory is awaited!)
- Anniversaries: 1 September; 2 August (day of the VDV)
- Engagements: World War II; Siege of Odessa; Defense of Sevastopol; Battle of the Kerch Peninsula; Battle of Stalingrad; Battle of Kursk; Battle of the Dnieper; Operation Bagration; Black January; January Events; First Nagorno-Karabakh War; First Chechen War; Second Chechen War; Battle for Height 776; Russo-Georgian War; Battle of Tskhinvali; Russo–Ukrainian War; Annexation of Crimea; War in Donbas; Invasion of Ukraine; 2022 Chornobaivka attacks; Battle of Bucha; 2022 Kherson counteroffensive; 2023 Ukrainian counteroffensive
- Decorations: Guards; Order of the Red Banner; Order of Suvorov
- Battle honours: Chernigov

Commanders
- Current commander: Maj. Gen. Denis Shishov
- Notable commanders: Gen. Vasily Margelov

The 76th Guards Chernigov Red Banner Order of Suvorov Air Assault Division (Russian: 76-я гвардейская десантно-штурмовая Черниговская Краснознаменная, ордена Суворова дивизия; MUN 07264) is a division of the Russian Airborne Forces based in Pskov. The division traces its lineage back to the 76th Guards Rifle Division, formed in March 1943 from the 157th Rifle Division for that division's actions during the Battle of Stalingrad. The division fought in the Battle of Kursk, the Battle of the Dnieper, Operation Bagration, the East Pomeranian Offensive, and the Berlin Offensive. Postwar, it was converted into an airborne division.

The division moved to Pskov, its current base, in 1947. The division was involved in Black January and the January Events in Lithuania. After the Dissolution of the Soviet Union, the division became part of the Russian Airborne Troops. The division became an air assault division in 2006.

The division fought in the First Chechen War, Second Chechen War, the Russo-Georgian War, and Donbas then 2022 Russian invasion of Ukraine, including committing alleged mass murder of civilians in Bucha.

== History ==
=== World War II ===
The 76th Air Assault Division was originally established in 1939 as the 157th Rifle Division. On 1 March 1943 it became the 76th Guards Rifle Division for its actions in the Battle of Stalingrad. Major General Alexander Kirsanov commanded the division. The division fought in the Battle of Kursk, fighting in the northern part of the Kursk Bulge. Until 3 July the division was part of the Bryansk Front in the area of Belyov. On 12 July the division began the crossing of the Oka. By the end of the day the division had captured bridgeheads. The division received thanks from the Supreme Commander (Stalin) for this action.

On 8 September, the division began to advance from the Oryol area to Chernigov. After three days the division had advanced 70 kilometers and reached the village of Tolstoles on 20 September, three kilometers northeast of Chernigov. The division then helped capture the city and advanced to the west. By an order of the Supreme Commander on 21 September the division was thanked and awarded the honorific "Chernigov".

The division then advanced into Belarus. It became part of the 1st Belorussian Front. On 17 July 1944 it began an attack northwest of Kovel. On 21 July the vanguard of the division moved north towards Brest in heavy fighting. On 26 July, troops advancing from the north and south linked up 20 to 25 kilometers west of Brest. German troops in the area were surrounded. For its actions in the capture of Brest, the division was awarded the Order of the Red Banner. On 25 January 1945, the division, as part of the 2nd Belorussian Front, blocked the route out of Toruń, surrounding German forces. In late February, the division attempted to cut the road out of Konitz. German troops were able to escape in the fighting.

On 23 March the division captured Sopot and advanced to the Baltic Sea. By 25 March it had captured Oliwa and was advancing towards Danzig. The division helped captured Danzig on 30 March. The division was moved from Danzig to Germany and on 24 April was concentrated near Kortenhaten, 20 kilometers south of Stettin. On 26 April the division crossed the Rondov canal and broke through the German line. By the end of the day it had captured Pretslavu.

On 2 May, the division captured Güstrow. On 3 May, after advancing 40 kilometers, it captured Karow and Butzow. The forward detachments of the 76th Guards Rifle Division reached the Baltic and on the outskirts of Wismar met with Allied airborne units of the 6th Airborne Division. The division was part of the 114th Rifle Corps of the 70th Army of the 2nd Belorussian Front in May 1945.

=== Cold War ===
On 6 July 1946, it became the 76th Guards Airborne Division in Novgorod, directly subordinated to Airborne headquarters. In April 1947, it moved to Pskov. Future Soviet Airborne Troops commander Vasily Margelov became the division's commander in April 1948. The division became part of the 15th Guards Airborne Corps in October 1948. It was composed of the 234th Guards Air-Landing Regiment, the 237th Guards Airborne Regiment and the 154th Guards Artillery Regiment.

On 18 February 1949 the 234th became an airborne regiment. On 30 April 1955, the 104th Guards Airborne Regiment moved to the division after the 21st Guards Airborne Division was disbanded. On 6 January 1959, the 242nd Separate Military-Transport Aviation Squadron was activated with the division. It included 10 An-2 Colt transports. On 15 August 1960, the 154th Guards Artillery Regiment became the 819th Separate Guards Artillery Battalion. On 27 April 1962, the battalion was upgraded to the 1140th Guards Artillery Regiment.

In 1967, the division participated in Exercise "Dnieper". In March 1970, the division participated in the combined arms exercise "Dvina". During the exercise, the division used the Antonov An-22 for the first time. The division participated in Exercise "Autumn-88". Between 1988 and 1992 the division participated in the suppression of interethnic conflicts in Armenia, Azerbaijan, Georgia, the Baltic region, Transdnistria, North Ossetia, and South Ossetia. In 1991, the 104th and 234th Guards Airborne Regiments were awarded the Ministry of Defense Pennant "For Courage and Valor". Earlier, the division and its artillery regiment had been awarded the pennant. The division took part in the August Coup of 1991, when it was sent to Estonia by the Coup's leaders to take over the Tallinn TV Tower.

=== Russian Airborne Troops ===
The division fought in the First Chechen War during 1994 and 1995. 120 military personnel of the division were killed during the war. For their actions, ten officers of the division received the title Hero of the Russian Federation, two of them posthumously. The division fought in the Second Chechen War between 1999 and 2004.

From 18 August 1999 elements of the division fought in the capture of Karamakhi, Gudermes, Argun, and the blocking of the Vedeno gorge. The 6th Company of the 104th Guards Airborne Regiment blocked the Argun Gorge in March 2000. For their actions, 22 soldiers were awarded the title Hero of the Russian Federation, all but one posthumously. 63 received the Order of Courage posthumously.

On 22 June 2001, the 237th Guards Airborne Regiment was disbanded. After an experimental period, the 104th Guards Airborne Regiment of the 76th Airborne Division in 2002 became the first Russian ground forces regiment that was fully composed of professional soldiers (and not of "srochniki" – the conscripted soldiers aged eighteen). The division became the first to move to the contract manning system in 2004. In 2006, the 76th Airborne Division became an Air Assault Division.

In 2008 the 76th Air Assault Division was involved in the 2008 South Ossetia war, being deployed to South Ossetia and fought in the Battle of Tskhinvali.

Since 27 February 2013, the division has been commanded by Major General Alexey Naumets.

=== Crimea and the war in Donbas ===
In 2014 division units were deplyed in the 2014 Russian annexation of Crimea. On 18 August, the division was awarded the Order of Suvorov by Vladimir Putin for the "successful completion of military missions" and "courage and heroism". On 20 August 2014, two BMD-2s of the 76th Guards Air Assault Division were captured by Ukrainian forces near Lutuhino in the Luhansk region. Ukrainian government officials presented Russian soldiers' IDs and other military documents from the vehicles. Russia's defence ministry denied the claim.

Several members of the division, among whom was the platoon commander Anton Korolenko, died on 19–20 August, under circumstances their families would not reveal. A Pskov newspaper reported that nearly an entire company of paratroopers from the 76th Guards Air Assault Division allegedly was lost during combat as part of the war in Donbas, having 80 dead, though without any conclusive proof.

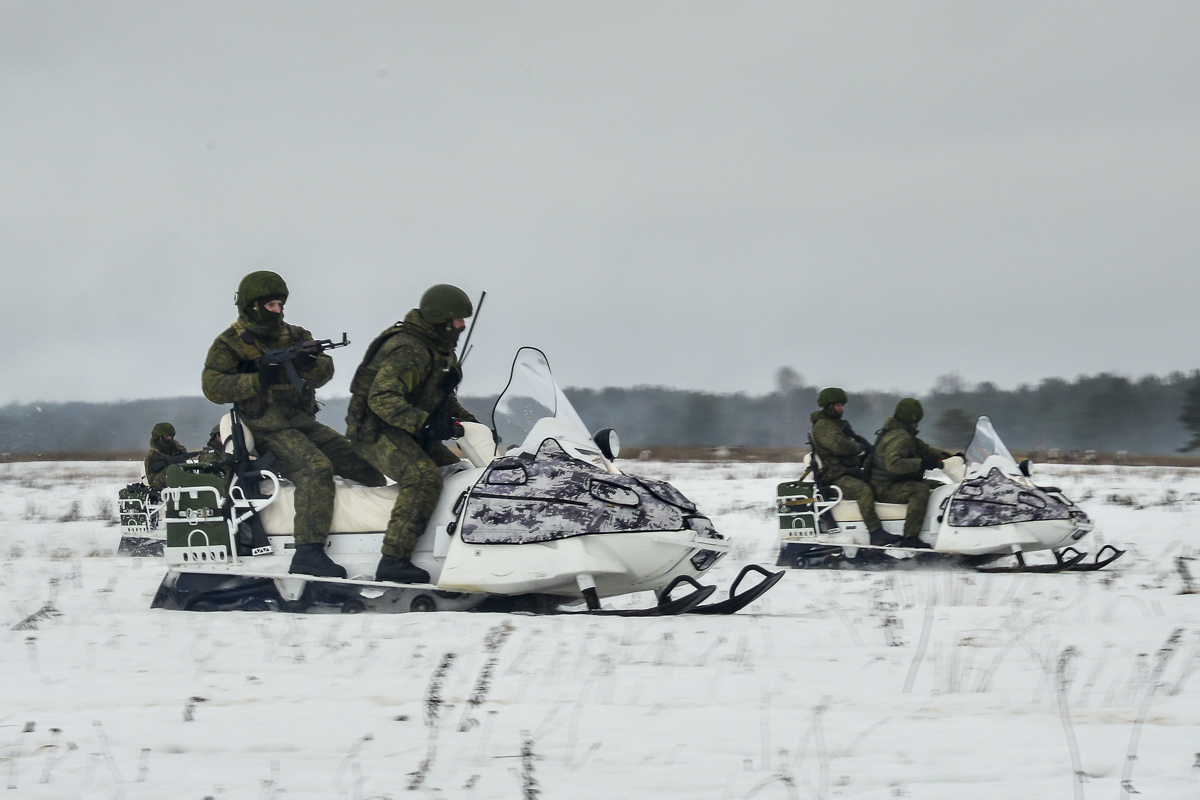
234th Guard Air Assault Regiment during 2019 winter training

76th Guards Air Assault Division's parachute landing in Pskov Oblast (05-09-2019)

In January 2022, elements of the division's 234th Air Assault Regiment and the 124th Tank Battalion were reportedly deployed to Belarus in the prelude to the Russian invasion of Ukraine.

=== 2022 Russian invasion of Ukraine ===
A command post of the 76th Guards Air Assault Division was attacked during the 2022 Chornobaivka attacks of the 2022 Russian invasion of Ukraine on 5 August 2022.

The 76th Guards Airborne Assault Division participated in assaults on Kyiv, Izyum, and Popasna. They were alleged to be responsible of running the cleansing operations during the Bucha massacre arresting, torturing and murdering Ukrainian civilians.

In September 2022 reports emerged from Ukrainian sources claiming the 237th Guards Air Assault Regiment "no longer exists due to either death or injury of all soldiers."

During the fall of 2022 the 76th GAAD fought outside of Beryslav in the Kherson Oblast and stopped the advance of the Ukrainian Marine Corps' 35th Marine Brigade towards the city, inflicting significant losses on the marines, before the Russian military evacuated all land west of the Dnieper river in November. It later fought near Kreminna in the battle of Donbass. In August 2023, it was ordered to reinforce the 58th Combined Arms Army in the Zaporozhye Oblast. The division was involved in defensive operations around Klishchiivka alongside the 98th Guards Airborne Division, and the Storm-Z penal battalion during the 2023 Ukrainian counteroffensive. In late 2025, Ukrainian forces reported that three regiments of the division were engaged in the Pokrovsk offensive.

== Subordinated units and fighting strength ==
The 76th Guards Air Assault Division consists of a division headquarters, three air assault regiments, one tank battalion, an artillery regiment, an anti-aircraft missile regiment, a reconnaissance battalion, and several directly subordinated combat support and combat service support battalions and companies. As of 2021, the 76th Air Assault Division consisted of the following units:

- Division Headquarters (Pskov, Western Military District)
  - 175th Reconnaissance Battalion
  - 124th Tank Battalion (T-72B3)
  - 7th Maintenance Battalion
  - 656th Engineering Battalion
  - 728th Communications Battalion
  - 1682nd Material Support Battalion
  - 3996th Military Hospital (Airmobile)
  - 201st Postal Station
  - Airborne Support Company
  - NBC Defense Company
  - Commandant's Company
- 104th Guards Air Assault Regiment
- 234th Guards Air Assault Regiment
- 237th Guards Air Assault Regiment (reinstated 2018)
- 1140th Guards Artillery Regiment
- 4th Guards Anti-Aircraft Missile Regiment

== Commanders (since 2005) ==
- 2005–2009 Guards Major General Aleksandr Kolpachenko
- 2009–2013 Guards Colonel Igor Vinogradskiy
- 27 February 2013 – February 2018 Guards Major General Aleksey Naumets
- February 2018 – July 2020 Guards Major General Igor Kapliy
- 19 July 2020 – 2022 Guards Major General Sergey Chubarykin
- April 2022 – March 2024 Guards Colonel Denis Shishov
- March 2024 – 5 May 2025 Guards Colonel Abdulaziz Shikhabirov
- June 2025 – present Guards Major General Denis Shishov

== Gallery ==
76th Guards Airborne Division shoulder sleeve insignia (1993–2006)

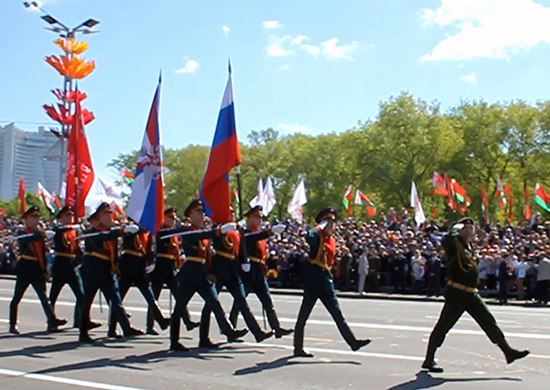
Troops of the division during a parade in Minsk in 2015

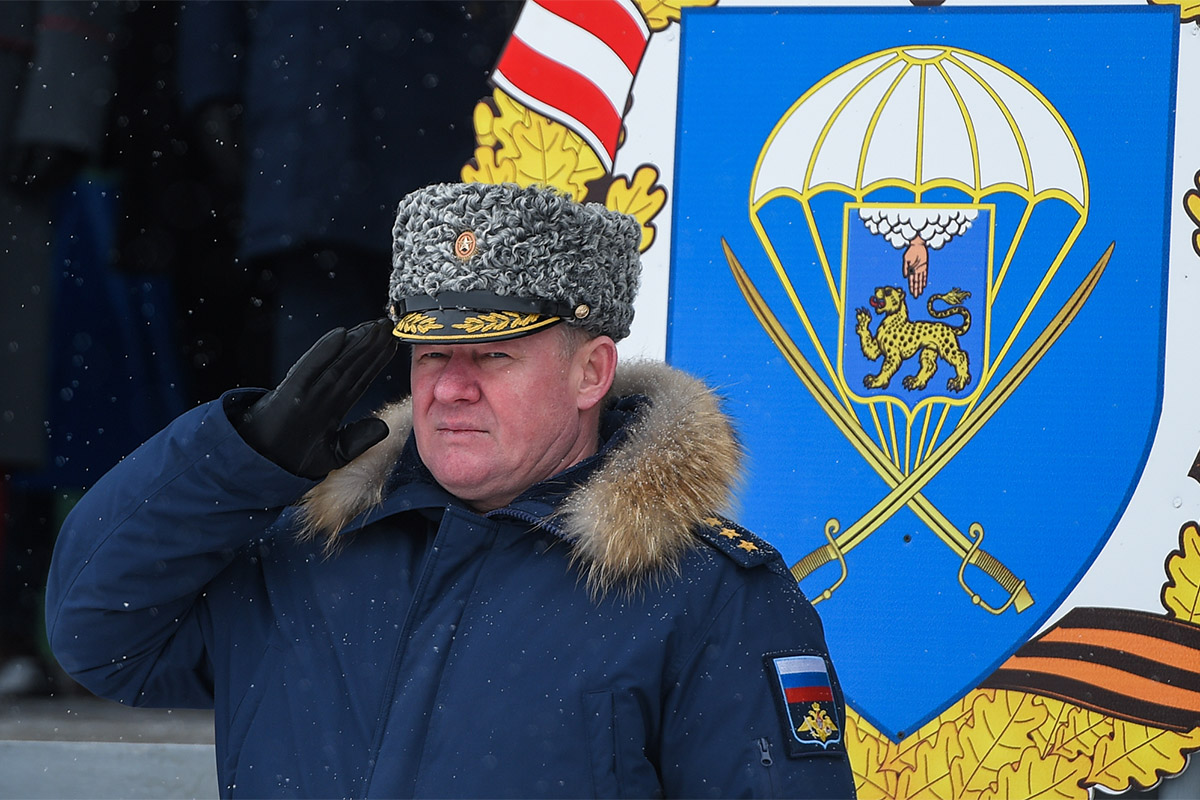
Russian Airborne Forces commander Andrey Serdyukov visiting the division

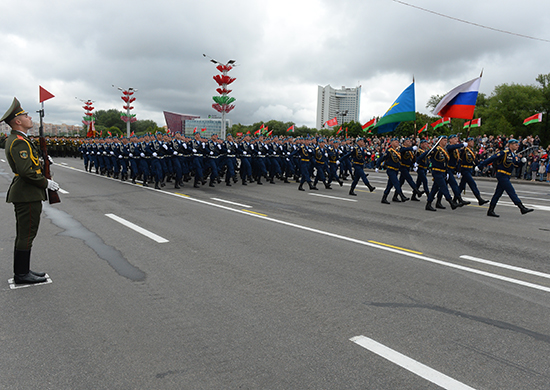
Personnel of the division at the 2018 Minsk Independence Day Parade
