= Sviatoshynsky Forest Park =

Coordinates: 50°26′04″N 30°15′57″E

Sviatoshynsky Forest Park is a forest park located in the region of Kyiv Polissya on the sandy terrace of the Irpin River in Ukraine. It has the status of a park-monument of landscape art.

== Including in the Holosiivskyi National Park ==
According to the Decree of the President of Ukraine No. 446/2014 dated May 1, 2014, the territory of Sviatoshynsky Forest Park was included in the boundaries of Holosiivskyi National Park without being seized from the land user: Sviatoshynsky Forest Park.

== Incident ==
On August 3, 2021, Vitaly Shishov, a well-known public figure in Belarus and Ukraine, was found hanged in a forest park.
