= 234th Guards Air Assault Regiment =

Russian military unit

234th St. Aleksandr Nevsky Guards Black Sea Order of Kutuzov Air Assault Regiment
- Russian: 234-й гвардейский десантно-штурмовой Черноморский ордена Кутузова 3-й степени полк имени Святого Александра Невского
- 234th Guards Air Assault Regiment shoulder sleeve insignia
- Active: 1946–present
- Country: Soviet Union (1946–1991); Russia (1991–present)
- Branch: Russian Airborne Forces
- Size: Regiment
- Part of: 76th Guards Air Assault Division
- Garrison/HQ: Pskov; MUN 74268
- Engagements: Second Chechen War: Russo-Ukrainian war; Annexation of Crimea by the Russian Federation; Russian invasion of Ukraine
- Decorations: Order of Kutuzov

Commanders
- Current commander: Colonel A “Uran” Rokossovsky

The 234th Guards Air Assault Regiment is a formation of the Russian Airborne Forces. It is part of the 76th Guards Air Assault Division.

== History ==
The regiment was formed on 7 June 1946 in Novgorod as the 234th Guards Air-Landing Regiment of the 76th Guards Air Assault Division. In 1947, its garrison was moved to Pskov. In 1949 it was converted into an airborne regiment.

=== Operations ===
In 2014, the regiment was involved in the Annexation of Crimea by the Russian Federation. It fought in the Russian invasion of Ukraine in 2022. The unit has lost several of its senior leadership in the war including Regiment Chief of Staff Lieutenant Colonel Igor Zharov and Regiment Deputy Commander Lieutenant Colonel Aleksey Afonin. In September 2024, a Ukrainian drone strike on a site in Glushkovsky District, Kursk Oblast killed Lieutenant Colonel Alexander Kurin, the commander of the regiment.

=== Bucha massacre ===
The Bucha massacre was the mass murder of Ukrainian civilians and prisoners of war by the Russian Armed Forces during the fight for and occupation of the city of Bucha as part of the Russian invasion of Ukraine, specifically the killing dozens of innocent civilians on Yablunska Street. Photographic and video evidence of the massacre emerged on 1 April 2022 after Russian forces withdrew from the city.

On 22 December 2022, The New York Times published the results of their investigation of the massacre. The eight-month visual investigation by the paper concluded that the perpetrators of the massacre along Yablunska Street were Russian paratroopers from the 234th Air Assault Regiment (part of 76th Guards Air Assault Division) led by Col. Rokossovsky.

=== Organization (from 2017) ===
- Regiment HQ
- 1st Airborne Assault Battalion
- 2nd Airborne Assault Battalion
- Parachute battalion
- Self-propelled artillery division
- Anti-tank battery
- Anti-tank battery of self-propelled anti-tank guns
- Anti-aircraft battery
- Reconnaissance company
- Engineer-sapper company
- Communications company
- Airborne support company
- Logistics company
- Repair company
- NBC Protection platoon

1,760 personnel, armed with: 108 BMD vehicles (28 BMD-4, 5 BMD-3, and 75 BMD-2), 42 BTR-D, 1 BMD-1R, 7 KShM (6 BMD-1KSh and 1 R-149BMRD), 6 BTR-RD "Robot" (with 9K113 "Konkurs" ATGM), 9 BTR-ZD "Skrezhet" (with ZU-23-2 and MANPADS), 10 1V119 "Rheostat" controllers, 24 2S9 "Nona-S" self-propelled mortars, and 6 2S25 "Sprut-SD" tank destroyers.

== In literature ==
The regiment is referenced in Tom Clancy's novel Red Storm Rising, where it takes part in Operation Polar Glory, the Soviet invasion of Iceland. In the book, the regiment travels hidden in the cargo hold of the merchant ship Yulius Fuchik.
