= Blue beret =

Blue-colored berets and organizations that use them

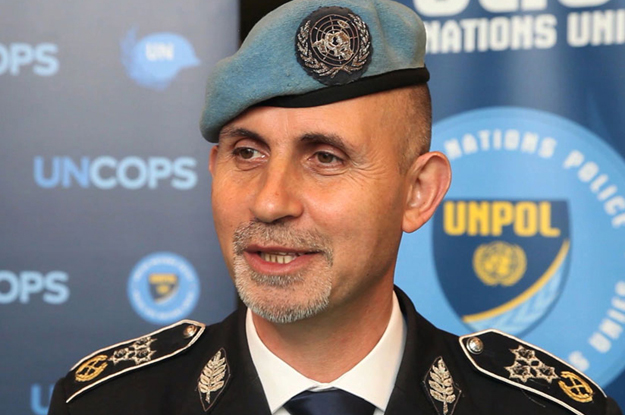
UN blue beret being worn by Luís Carrilho, head of the United Nations Police

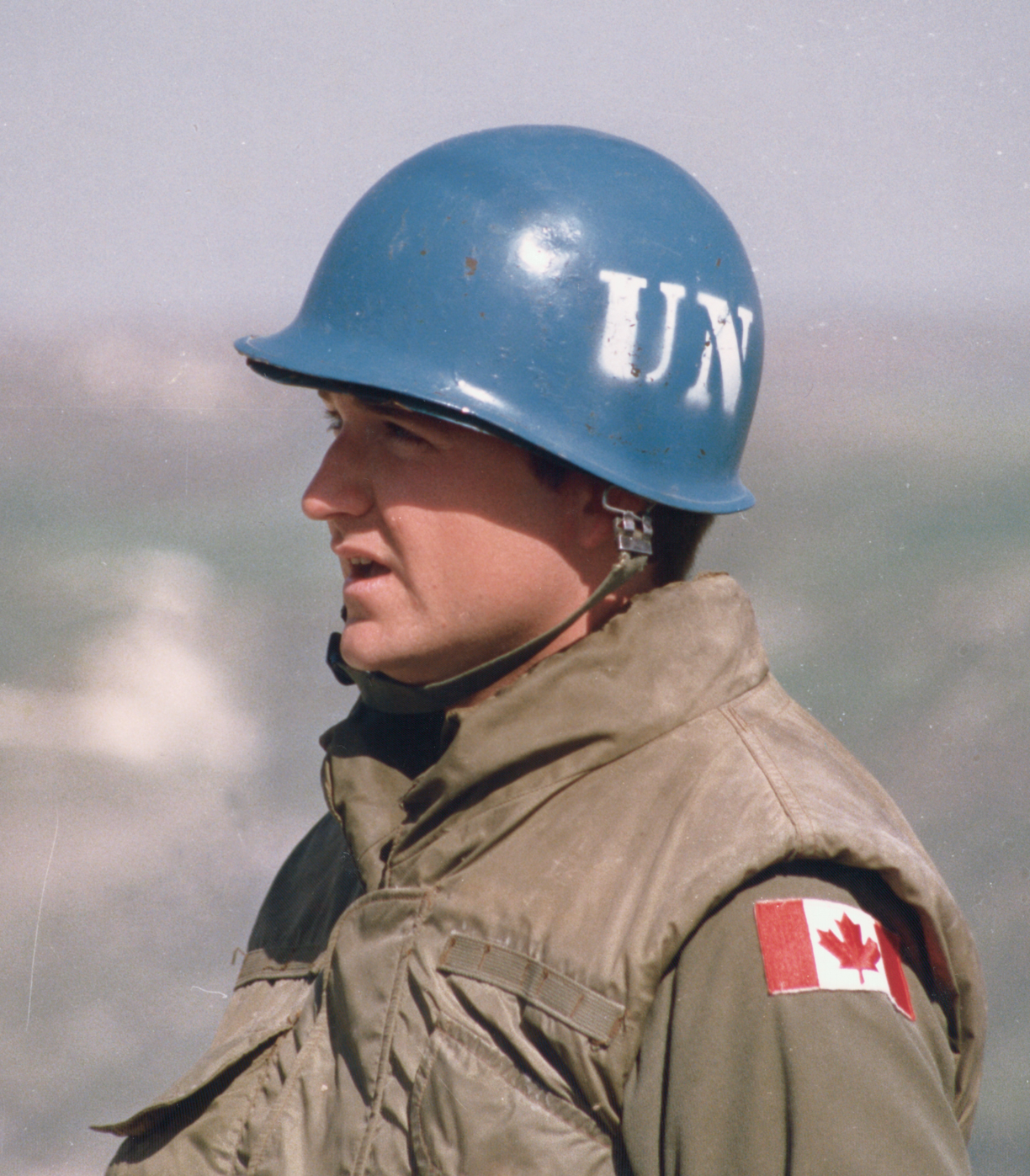
Canadian peacekeeper in 1976 wearing the distinctive UN blue helmet

A blue beret is a blue-colored beret used by various (usually special) military and other organizations. United Nations peacekeepers are often referred to as Blue Berets or Blue Helmets because of their light blue berets or helmets, this includes soldiers, police officers, and civilian personnel. The blue helmet is used as the logo of United Nations Peacekeeping.

== Military forces ==
- Australian Army Aviation, Royal Australian Air Force Airfield Defence Guards
- Belarusian Ground Forces
- Brazilian Army cadets (dark blue) and Brazilian Army Aviation (royal blue)
- Royal Canadian Air Force as well as Canadian Army units including Artillery, Electrical and Mechanical Engineers and Signals (dark blue known as "army blue")
- Finnish Air Force, army aviation and military bands all use a blue beret. UN light blue for certain peacekeeping forces, navy blue for the Finnish Navy
- Greek Presidential Guard (light blue)
- Hellenic Army (dark blue), except for Armour, Special Forces, Army Aviation, and Airmobile troops
- German Air Force Regiment, Naval Force Protection Battalion, Kommando Spezialkräfte Marine, German personnel of the Eurocorps and the I. German/Dutch Corps, various others (navy blue)
- German Army medical personnel (cobalt blue)
- Kazakhstani Airmobile Troops
- Royal Malaysian Navy
- Moldovan Ground Forces
- Royal New Zealand Military Police
- Royal New Zealand Air Force Police
- Pakistan Army Corps Of Engineers
- Polícia Aérea, the Portuguese Air Force security forces
- Portuguese Navy
- Royal Malaysian Air Force PASKAU
- Spanish Royal Guard
- Soviet and Russian Airborne Troops (VDV)
- Turkish Armed Forces personnel who completed the Commando course and are assigned to Commando brigades and Gendarmerie General Command
- United Kingdom Army Air Corps, Royal Air Force
- United Nations Peacekeeping troops
- United States Air Force Security Forces
- United States Air Force Academy upper-class cadets (during training)

== Police forces ==
- Special Purpose Police Unit (Azerbaijan), Internal Troops of Azerbaijan
- Royal Malaysia Police
  - Royal Malaysia Police General Operations Force
  - Royal Malaysia Police Marine Operations Force
- Gendarmery (Serbia), Special Police Units (Serbia), Ministry of Internal Affairs (Serbia)
- Bodyguard Corps of the Public Security Police of Portugal

== Other organizations ==
- National Blue Beret, an activity in the United States Civil Air Patrol program
- Lazarus Union, members who are uniformed members in active duty around the world
- Blue Berets (performers), a performing ensemble whose members are all part of the Russian armed forces
- UNEDU Blue Berets, international humanitarian aid agency
