= 11th Guards Air Assault Brigade =

11th Guards Air Assault Brigade (2015–present) 11th Air Assault Brigade (1998–2015) 11th Airborne Brigade (1990–1998) 11th Air Assault Brigade (1968–1990)
- 11-я гвардейская десантно-штурмовая орденов Суворова и Жукова бригада
- Active: 1968–present
- Country: Soviet Union (to 1991); Russia
- Branch: Russian Airborne Forces
- Type: Air assault
- Size: Brigade
- Garrison/HQ: Ulan-Ude, Buryatia, Russia
- Nicknames: "Black Brigade", "Ghosts", "Black Wolves"
- Patron: St. Elijah the Prophet
- Decorations: Guards; Order of Suvorov; Order of Zhukov

Commanders
- Current commander: Guards Lt. Col. Vitaly Laskov

Insignia
- Sleeve patch

The 11th Guards Air Assault Orders of Suvorov and Zhukov Brigade (Note: Russian: 11-я гвардейская десантно-штурмовая орденов Суворова и Жукова бригада) is an air assault brigade of the Russian Airborne Forces, currently based at Sosnovy Bor near Ulan Ude in Buryatia. The brigade was first formed in 1968 as the 11th Separate Air Assault Brigade and two of its helicopter regiments fought in the Soviet–Afghan War. Its name and designation was changed several times during its history; in 2015 it received the title Guards from President Vladimir Putin.

== History ==
The brigade was formed as the 11th Separate Airborne Brigade on 1 August 1968 in Mogocha. Along with the 13th Separate Airborne Brigade, it was the first of many Soviet air assault brigades formed in the Cold War. It was formed from the 1st Battalion of the 113th Guards Motorized Rifle Regiment of the 38th Guards Motor Rifle Division, which was renamed the 617th Separate Airborne Assault Battalion. The 696th Helicopter Regiment, 656th Separate Communications Company and the 49th Separate Airfield Technical Support company combined to form the 211th Aviation Group. The 618th and 619th Separate Airborne Assault battalions were formed from two battalions of the 52nd Motorized Rifle Division in Nizhneudinsk. The 284th Independent Artillery Battalion was formed in Mogocha during the same month. The 617th, 618th and 619th Separate Airborne Assault Battalions (OVSHB) became air assault battalions (ODSHB) in April 1969. In July 1971, it was renamed the 11th Landing-Assault Brigade (air assault; ODShBr).

Between 1981 and 1987, crews from the brigade's 307th and 329th Helicopter Regiments participated in the Soviet–Afghan War attached to the 280th Separate Helicopter Regiment on a one-year rotational basis. On 8 December 1987, the brigade was awarded the Ministry of Defence pennant "for courage and valor" for its performance during exercises in the Arctic. By a directive of the Soviet defense ministry, the brigade became the 11th Separate Airborne Brigade and its battalions were renumbered as the 1st, 2nd and 3rd Line Paratroop Battalions (PDB) in 1988. In May 1993, the brigade was relocated to Ulan-Ude. The brigade formed the 226th Separate Squadron Military Transport Aviation in December 1994. The 80th Independent Tank Battalion was added to the brigade and the 1st and 2nd Line Paratroop Battalions became the 498th and 499th Separate Airborne Battalions equipped with BMP-2 infantry fighting vehicles in July 1995. The 712th Guards Howitzer Artillery Battalion also became part of the brigade during this period. In February 1996, the 500th Separate Airborne Battalion was formed from the 3rd Line Paratroop Battalion. The 226th Separate Squadron Military Transport Aviation was disbanded in December, and the 80th Independent Tank Battalion in August 1997. On 1 May 1998, the brigade was again renamed the 11th Air Assault Brigade.

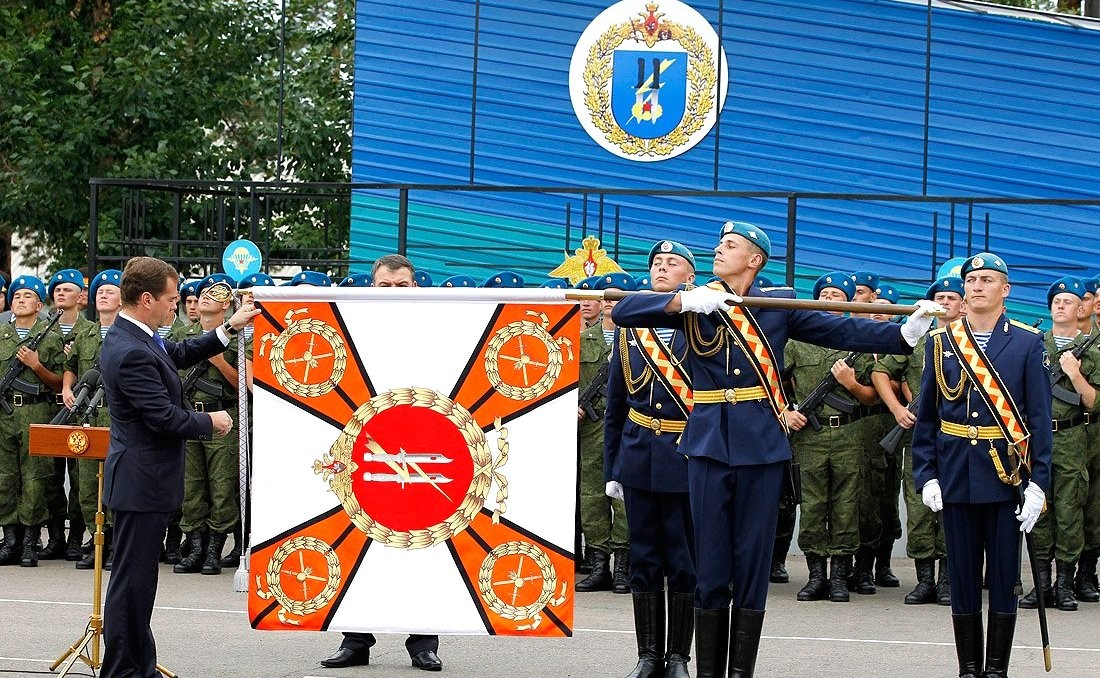
Dmitry Medvedev presents a new flag to soldiers of the 11th Airborne Brigade

The brigade's 500th Separate Airborne Battalion was disbanded in 2006. During the Vostok-2010 exercises, the brigade showed military skill, for which it was awarded the pennant "for military valor" of the Ministry of Defence. During the same year, the brigade became part of the 36th Army. The brigade was presented with a new flag by Dmitry Medvedev on 24 August 2011. The brigade became part of the Russian Airborne Troops in December 2013. On 25 March 2015, the brigade was assigned the title 'Guards'.

In January 2022, elements of the brigade were reportedly deployed to Belarus in the context of the prelude to the Russian invasion of Ukraine. The brigade was then employed in the invasion. A successful air assault by the brigade seized the Kakhovka Dam and bridge on the Dnieper. On March 7, 2022, the Ukrainian military claimed to have killed Lt. Col. Denis Glebov, deputy commander of the brigade.

On October 26, 2023, the brigade was awarded the Order of Suvorov. On September 18, 2024, the unit was awarded the Order of Zhukov.

In March 2025, members of the brigade took part in a raid into Ukrainian-occupied territory in Kursk Oblast by traveling through a 15-kilometer gas pipeline and emerging behind Ukrainian lines. This is operation has been credited by the general Apti Alaudinov for having role in the rapid fall of Ukrainian defenses around Sudzha.

== Structure ==
=== Current ===
The Russian air assault brigade currently consists of:

- Brigade Headquarters
- Airborne Battalion
- 1st Air Assault Battalion
- 2nd Air Assault Battalion
- Howitzer Artillery Battalion (122mm D-30)
- Anti-Aircraft Missile-Artillery Battery
- Anti-Tank Missile Battery
- Reconnaissance Battalion
- Special Purpose Company
- Rifle Company (Snipers)
- Control Company
- Engineering Company
- Landing Support Company
- NBC Defense Platoon
- Maintenance Company
- Material Support Company
- Medical Company
- Commandant's Platoon
- Tank Company
- Buryat Battalion

=== Historical ===
Battalions were renumbered in 1996, and from 1996 to 2006 the brigade included the 498th, 499th, and 500th Battalions. The 500th Battalion was disbanded in 2006.

- 498th Separate Airborne Battalion
- 499th Separate Airborne Battalion

== Commanders ==
- Colonel Yuriy Ivanovich Duk (1968 — 1972)
- Major General Valentin Aleksandrovich Shmelyov (1972 — 1979)
- Colonel Ivan Vasilyevich Kolesnikov (1979 — 1983)
- Colonel Albert Grigoryevich Bondar (1983 — 1986)
- Colonel Mukhamed Tuchevich Batyrov (1986 — 1989)
- Colonel Anatoliy Petrovich Kachanov (1989 — 1991)
- Colonel Vyacheslav Nikolaevich Borisov (1991 — 1995)
- Colonel Vasiliy Mikhailovich Malyk (1995 — 1998)
- Colonel Vladimir Evgenyevich Voronkov (1998 — 2000)
- Colonel Nikolai Nikolaevich Gordeyev (2000 — 2002)
- Colonel Andrey Evgenyevich Khoptyar (2002 — 2005)
- Colonel Vitaliy Aleksandrovich Bronyuk (2005 — 2012)
- Guards Colonel Mikhail Nikolaevich Ugolyov (2012 — 2013)
- Colonel Oleg Mityaev (2013 — 2015)
- Guards Colonel Ruslan Leontyevich Evkodimov (2015 — 2020)
- Guards Colonel Denis Shishov (2020 — 2022)
- Guards Colonel Zayan Aleksandrovich Bayanov (c. 2023 – 2024)
- Guards Lieutenant Colonel Vitaly Aleksandrovich Laskov (2024 – present)
