= Sosnovy Bor (garrison) =

Coordinates: 51°51′5″N 107°53′47″E

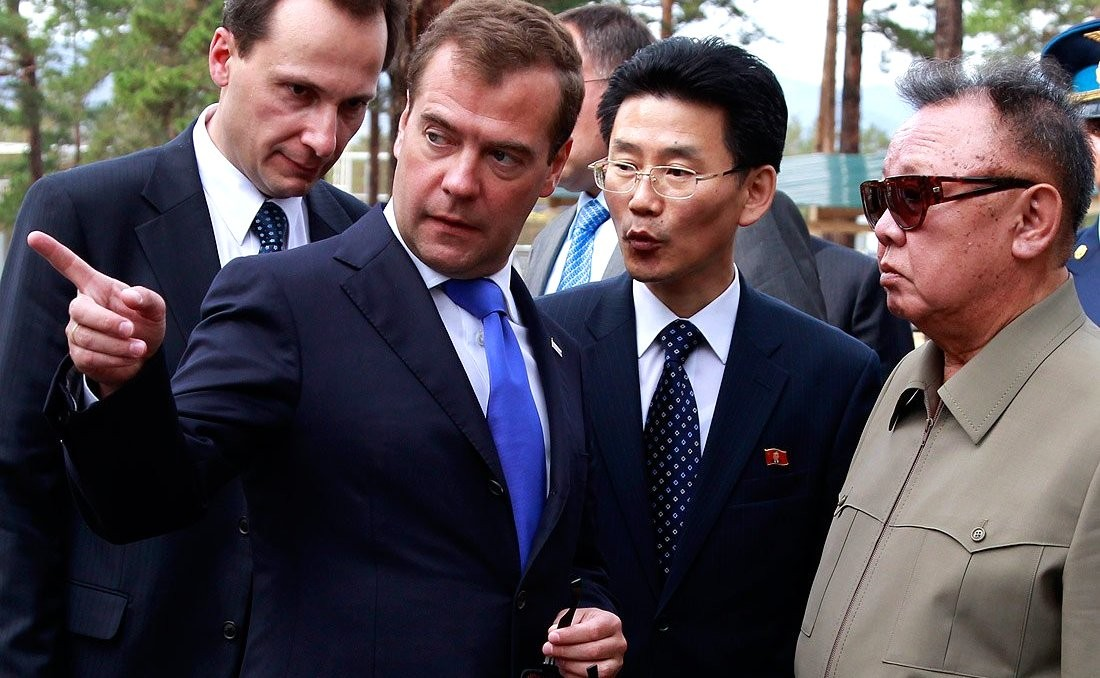
Kim Jong-il with Russian president Dmitry Medvedev in the Sosnovy-Bor Military garrison, Buriatya on 24 August 2011

Sosnovy Bor (Russian: Сосно́вый Бор means "Pine Forest") is a Russian Airborne Troops garrison in Buryatia, Russia, located about 20km east of Ulan Ude, Buryatia's capital. The compound was used for the meeting of President Dmitry Medvedev and North Korean leader Kim Jong-il in August 2011.

It appears to be the garrison of the 11th Guards Airborne Brigade of the Russian Airborne Troops.
