= Buryat Battalion =

- Бурятский Батальон
- Active: 2024–present (allegedly)
- Country: Russia North Korea
- Branch: 11th Guards Air Assault Brigade, Airborne Troops
- Type: Battalion
- Size: Battalion
- Engagements: Russian invasion of Ukraine

Commanders
- Current commander: Unknown

The Buryat Battalion is a battalion that supposedly serves within the Russian army, allegedly consisting of soldiers from North Korea tasked to take part in the Russian invasion of Ukraine. The battalion is allegedly part of the 11th Guards Air Assault Brigade.

On October 19, 2024, U.S. Secretary of Defense Lloyd Austin stated that he could not confirm reports of North Korean troops being sent to Russia for potential deployment in Ukraine. However, subsequent statements from the U.S. State Department in November 2024 confirmed the presence of over 10,000 North Korean soldiers in western Russia and eastern Ukraine, engaging in combat operations alongside Russian soldiers.

The battalion is reportedly involved in combat activities around the settlements of Sudzha and Kursk. However, there have been instances of desertion among the North Korean soldiers assigned to this unit. In October 2024, reports emerged that 18 North Korean servicemen attempted to escape from their positions in Russia's Kursk Oblast.
