= Blue Berets (performers) =

Russian Military Musicians

Blue Berets Голубые береты
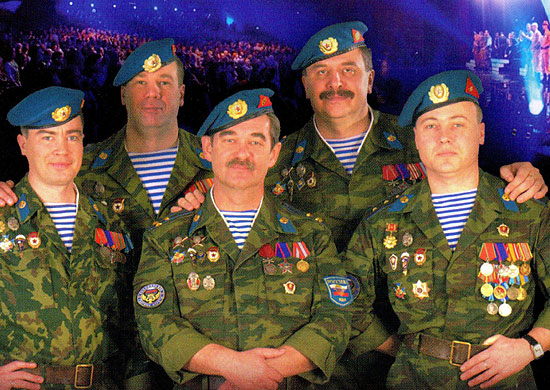

Background information
- Origin: Moscow, Russia
- Years active: 1985–present
- Past members: Sergey Yarovoy; Oleg Gontsov; Sergei Isakov

Blue Berets (Russian: Голубые береты) is a musical group, part of the Russian Federation Ministry of Defence as part of the Song and Dance Ensemble of the Russian Airborne Forces (VDV).

== History ==
In August 1985, the ensemble was formed in the storeroom of 2nd Company of the 1st Battalion of the 350th Guards Airborne Regiment of the 103rd Separate Guards Airborne Brigade. It was founded by Sergey Isakov, Igor Ivanchenko and company foreman Oleg Gontsov. In November they were joined by Sergey Yarovoy. The first concert took place in Afghanistan, on the evening of 19 November 1985 for the 350th Guards Airborne Regiment.

From then to February 1987, the band performed for many parts of the Soviet forces in the Republic of Afghanistan, the Soviet Embassy, sales office, offices of the Afghan Interior Ministry and the KGB, and the Polytechnic Institute of Kabul.

In 1988 - the ensemble was situated near Moscow in a military camp of the 171st Airborne Brigade separate communication (now 38th Guards Communications Brigade) in the village Bear Lakes, while remaining amateur.

It is the only ensemble in the Armed Forces of Russia, where all participants are Honored Artists of the Russian Federation.

== Members ==
The head of the ensemble was Komsomol Committee secretary regiment captain Sergey Yarovoy The other members were Company Sergeant 350th RAP Ensign Oleg Gontsov, squad leader Sergeant Sergei Isakov, Mechanic - driver Private Igor Ivanchenko and soldier Tarikh Lyssov.
