= 83rd Guards Air Assault Brigade =

Russian Airborne Forces formation

83rd Guards Order of Suvorov Air Assault Brigade 83rd Air Assault Brigade (1998–2015) 83rd Airborne Brigade (1990–1998) 83rd Air Assault Brigade (1986–1990)
- 83-я гвардейская десантно-штурмовая ордена Суворова бригада
- Active: 1986–present
- Country: Soviet Union (1986–1991); Russia (1991–)
- Branch: Russian Airborne Forces
- Type: Airborne forces
- Role: Light Infantry; Airborne Infantry; Airmobile infantry
- Size: Brigade
- Garrison/HQ: Ussuriysk
- Patron: St. Elijah the Prophet
- Mottos: Честь дороже жизни! (Honour over life)
- March: "We Need One Victory (Our 10th Parachute Battalion)"
- Anniversaries: 29 November
- Engagements: Russo-Ukrainian War; Battle of Bakhmut; 2023 Ukrainian counteroffensive; 2024 Kharkiv offensive; 2025 Belgorod Oblast incursion
- Decorations: Guards; Order of Suvorov

Commanders
- Current commander: Guards Colonel Aleksandr Shipov

The 83rd Guards Order of Suvorov Air Assault Brigade (Note: Russian: 83-я гвардейская десантно-штурмовая ордена Суворова бригада) is an airborne brigade of the Russian Airborne Forces, first formed in 1986. It is currently based in Ussuriysk, in the Russian Far East.

== History ==
=== Soviet era ===
The brigade traces its history back to the formation of the 65th Separate Air Assault Battalion in Białogard from the 126th Separate Guards Reconnaissance Battalion of the 6th Guards Motor Rifle Division in November 1985, part of the Northern Group of Forces. Between May and November 1986, the battalion was expanded to form the 83rd Separate Air Assault Brigade under the command of Colonel V.M. Sinitsyn. The brigade participated in the "Druzhba-86" exercises of Warsaw Pact troops. In 1988, after Soviet Ministry of Defense inspections, the brigade had the best results out of the Northern Group of Forces. The brigade won a Krasnaya Zvezda contest involving a 10 kilometer forced march in 1989. On 18 May 1990, the brigade was subordinated directly to the commander of the VDV and was reorganized as the 83rd Separate Airborne Brigade. The brigade was transferred to Ussuriysk in the Far Eastern Military District during July.

=== Russian Airborne Troops ===
On 1 February 1996, the brigade was detached from the Russian Airborne Troops and subordinated to the Far Eastern Military District. In a 2002 exercise, the brigade successfully cooperated with Naval Infantry at Cape Klerk southwest of Vladivostok, earning it compliments from the Minister of Defence Sergei Ivanov. From 22 June 2004, the brigade participated in the exercise "Mobilnost-2004". In fall 2006, the brigade was given the banner of the Military Council. On 1 December 2013, the brigade was transferred to the Russian Airborne Troops. It was awarded Guards status on 25 March 2015.

==== Deployment in Ukraine ====
In 2022, the brigade reportedly took part in the Russian invasion of Ukraine. According to Ukrainian state media, its deputy commander, Lieutenant Colonel Vitaliy Slabtsov, was killed in action during the invasion.

In July 2022 the website of the National Resistance Center of Ukraine reported that it had received large amounts of information from a source within the brigade. The NRC published personal data such as passports and certificates, as well as some military documents, including classified data like organization charts, personnel lists, phone numbers, and addresses.

On May 21, 2022, VDV Major Vladimir Chilin, who previously served in Syria, was killed in Ukraine and buried in Ryazan. He was reportedly the deputy commander of a battalion in the 83rd Air Assault Brigade.

In July 2023, the brigade was awarded the Order of Suvorov.

In June 2024 the brigade took part in the 2024 Kharkiv offensive. David Axe, a military correspondent for Forbes, cited a Ukrainian correspondent when he reported that the brigade had to withdraw from the frontline after sustaining too many casualties in the battle of Vovchansk. However, this was later proved to be false by the Institute for the Study of War who assessed that the brigade was still operating in Vovchansk.

In July 2024, the brigade commander, Guards Colonel Artyom Gorodilov, was arrested after the Investigative Committee of the Russian Federation found out that he and other officers set up a scheme in which servicemen of the brigade wounded each other to collect compensation from the government. The amount of illegally obtained funds was estimated at around 200 million rubles.

== Composition ==
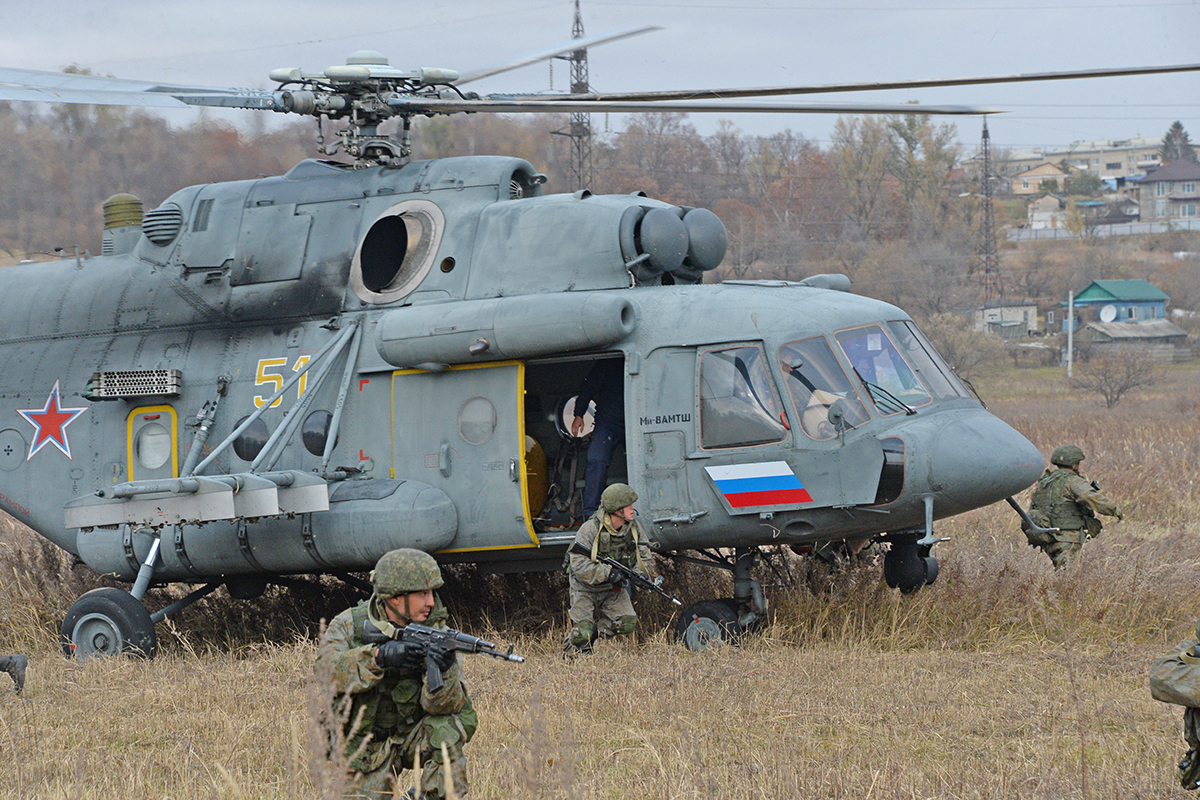
Paratroopers of the 83rd Guards Air Assault Brigade during an exercise in Ussuriysk, 2017.

In 1996, the brigade was composed of the following units.

- 598th Airborne Battalion
- 635th Airborne Battalion
- 654th Airborne Battalion
- 9th Guards Artillery Battalion
- "Tigers" drone detachment

The structure of the brigade has been unclear; it has incorporated a tank battalion in the past.
