= 37th Separate Airborne Brigade =

37th Separate Air Assault Brigade (Oct 1979–1 Jun 1990) 37th Separate Airborne Brigade (1 Jun 1990–1994)
- Active: 1979–1994
- Country: Soviet Union (1979–1992); Russia (1992–1994)
- Branch: Soviet Ground Forces; Soviet Airborne Forces; Russian Airborne Forces
- Type: Airborne infantry
- Size: Brigade
- Garrison/HQ: Chernyakhovsk

The 37th Separate Airborne Brigade was an airborne brigade of the Soviet and later Russian Airborne Forces. It was based in Chernyakhovsk, prior to being disbanded in 1994.

== History ==
The 37th Separate Air Assault Brigade was formed in October 1979 in Chernyakhovsk in the Baltic Military District. It was composed of three airborne battalions, an air assault battalion, an artillery battalion and an antiaircraft artillery battalion. The brigade was transferred to the Soviet airborne on 1 June 1990 and redesignated as an airborne brigade. Its air assault battalion was disbanded and its antiaircraft artillery battalion became a battery. In 1994, the brigade was disbanded.
