= 13th Separate Air Assault Brigade =

Soviet and Russian Airborne Troops unit (1968–96)

13th Separate Air Assault Brigade (Jul 1971–Jun 1990) 13th Separate Airborne Brigade
- Active: 1968–1996
- Country: Soviet Union (1968–1992); Russia (1992–1996)
- Branch: Soviet Army; Russian Airborne Troops
- Type: Air Assault/Airborne
- Size: Brigade
- Garrison/HQ: Magdagachi, Amur Oblast

The 13th Separate Airborne Brigade was an airborne brigade of the Soviet and Russian Airborne Troops between 1968 and 1996.

== History ==
The 13th Separate Airborne Brigade was activated in August 1968 in Magdagachi, part of the Far Eastern Military District. It was composed of the 620th, 621st and 622nd Separate Air Assault Battalions, as well as a separate artillery battalion and the 332nd Aviation Group. In July 1971, the brigade was renamed the 13th Separate Air Assault Brigade. The 332nd Aviation Group was broken up into the 394th and 398th Separate Helicopter Regiments on 1 September 1977. On the same day, the artillery battalion was disbanded and replaced by an anti-aircraft artillery battery and an artillery battery. In 1988, the brigade participated in a large exercise on Iturup. Both helicopter regiments were detached in early 1988 and were subordinated directly to the Far Eastern Military District.

On 1 June 1990, the brigade was transferred to the Soviet airborne and renamed the 13th Separate Airborne Brigade. In December 1995, it again became part of the Far Eastern Military District. It was disbanded in 1996.
