= 38th Guards Communications Brigade =

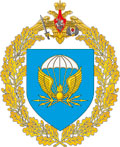
- Active: 1997–present
- Country: Russia (1997–present)
- Branch: Russian Airborne Forces
- Role: Signals Communication
- Garrison/HQ: Moscow
- Nickname: Pokazuha
- Motto: "Reliability always!"
- Engagements: Insurgency in the North Caucasus; Kosovo War

Commanders
- Current commander: Colonel Viktor Babikov
- Notable commanders: A.G. Taratuto

The 38th Guards Communications Brigade is a signals brigade in the Russian Airborne Forces. It is currently located near Bear Lake, Moscow.

On February 1, 1997, the 171st separate communications brigade was reorganized into the 38th separate communications regiment. The Brigade was scattered across Bosnia and Herzegovina as well as Kosovo. The Brigade Also had action in counter terror operations in the north Caucasus. By 2015 the Regiment was turned into a brigade and given the honorary name "Guards". At the moment, it consists of a command battalion and a few communications battalions. some of the tasks currently being performed by the 38th Guards Communications Brigade are establishing communications in military field conditions during exercises, landing aircraft with groups of paratroopers and establishing navigation of aviation equipment.

== Commanders ==
- Major Sidorenko Nikolai Klimentievich (1947–1948)
- Lieutenant Colonel Sinelnikov David Ruvimovich (1948–1950)
- Lieutenant Colonel Gorbunov Ivan Zakharovich (1950–1953)
- Lieutenant Colonel Popov Mikhail Sergeevich (1953–1965)
- Lieutenant Colonel Denisov Nikolay Vasilyevich (1965–1970)
- Major Khudoklinov Viktor Pavlovich (1970–1972)
- Lieutenant Colonel Malakhov Arkady Viktorovich (1972–1977)
- Lieutenant Colonel Gorshenev Vladimir Vasilyevich (1977–1982)
- Colonel Korotkov Yuri Mikhailovich (1982–1987)
- Colonel Usachev Sergey Alekseevich (1987–1994)
- Colonel Tomin Oleg Nikolaevich (1994–1997)
- Lieutenant colonel Isaev Nikolai Nikolaevich (1997–1999)
- Colonel Sineshchekov Valery Nikolaevich (1999–2002)
- Colonel Roman Kutuzov (2002–2008)
- Colonel Grechkov Alexander Vladimirovich (2010–2014)
- Guards Colonel Hamburg Alexey Alexandrovich (2014–2021)
- Guards Colonel Babikov Viktor Mikhailovich (since 2021)
