= Russian Airborne Forces =

Russian Armed Forces airborne combat arm

- Воздушно-десантные войска России; Vozdushno-desantnye voyska Rossii
- Middle emblem of the Russian Airborne Forces
- Founded: 7 May 1992
- Country: Russia
- Branch: Russian Armed Forces
- Type: Airborne forces
- Role: Light infantry; Airborne infantry; Airmobile infantry; Mechanized infantry
- Size: 60,000 (post-expansion 2022)
- Nicknames: Blue Berets, Winged Infantry, Troops of Uncle Vasya, Angels of Death
- Mottos: Никто, кроме нас! (Nobody, but us!)
- Color of Beret: Ultramarine
- Anniversaries: Paratroopers' Day (2 August)
- Engagements: First Chechen War; War in Dagestan; Second Chechen War; Incident at Pristina airport; Russo-Georgian War; Annexation of Crimea by the Russian Federation; Operation Grand Dawn (allegedly); 2022 Kazakh unrest; Russo-Ukrainian War
- Website: Official website

Commanders
- Supreme Commander-in-Chief: President Vladimir Putin
- Minister of Defense: Andrey Belousov
- Commander: Colonel General Mikhail Teplinsky
- Chief of Staff & First Deputy Commander: Major General Aleksandr Kornev
- Deputy Commander: Major General Nikolai Choban

Insignia
- Flag

- Patch

- Great emblem

- Insignia

The Russian Airborne Forces (Russian: Воздушно-десантные войска России, ВДВ, romanized: Vozdushno-desantnye voyska Rossii, VDV) is the airborne combat arm of the Russian Armed Forces. It is a rapid response force and strategic reserve that is under the President of Russia, reporting directly to the Chief of the General Staff, and is organized into airborne and air assault units. It was formed in 1992 from divisions of the Soviet Airborne Forces that came under Russian control following the dissolution of the Soviet Union.

Troops of the Russian Airborne Forces have traditionally worn a blue beret and blue-striped telnyashka undershirt and are called desant (Russian: Десант), from the French Descente.

The Russian Airborne Forces utilizes a range of specialist airborne warfare vehicles and are fully mechanized. Traditionally they have had a larger complement of heavy weaponry than most contemporary airborne forces.

== Mission ==
According to an order of the Ministry of Defense of the Russian Federation in 1997, the Airborne Forces form the strategic reserve of the Supreme Commander-in-Chief of the Armed Forces, under the direct command of the Chief of the General Staff, and as a rapid response force may be tasked with carrying out operations either independently or within larger army groups alongside units of the Ground Forces. The Airborne Forces can also participate in peacekeeping missions under the mandate of the United Nations (UN) or the Collective Security Treaty Organization (CSTO).

The Airborne Forces are organized into three types of units, consisting of Airborne, Air Assault, and Mountain Air Assault. The airborne units can be parachuted into a combat zone, while the air assault units are airlifted there by aircraft or helicopter. Specifically designated mountain units were created after the Airborne Forces were frequently used in conflicts in the North Caucasus region in the immediate post-Soviet years. The structure of the Airborne Forces uses airborne or air assault divisions for the operational level, airborne or air assault brigades for the operational-tactical level, and regiments for the tactical level. This structure can be augmented with the addition of Ground Forces motorized rifle, artillery, aviation, or other units, depending on the situation.

After studying airborne operations during World War II, the Soviet leadership concluded they were largely unsuccessful, with only a few exceptions. They recognized the potential for an airborne force to attack targets behind enemy lines, but the main problems that were identified included a lack of firepower. An effort to resolve this was the introduction of the BMD series of armored vehicles in 1970, which were eventually issued to every regiment of an airborne division. Up to the present, the Russian Airborne Forces are more heavily armed than their Western counterparts, with the usage of armored personnel carriers.

== History ==
=== Founding and reorganization ===
The dissolution of the Soviet Union led to the dividing up of the former Soviet Armed Forces by the newly independent states. The Russian Airborne Forces were established on 7 May 1992 by a decree from the President of the Russian Federation, Boris Yeltsin. He held a meeting with the heads of state of Kazakhstan, Kyrgyzstan, and Uzbekistan to determine the distribution of former Soviet military assets. During 1992 and 1993 many of the airborne units were transferred to the territory of Russia, as only two of the seven Soviet airborne divisions had been located in the former Russian Soviet Federative Socialist Republic. During this process the Russian General Staff wanted to prioritize maintaining control over the strategic assets of the Soviet military, which besides the Strategic Rocket Forces also included the Airborne Forces. There was initially an attempt to keep them under the joint command of the Commonwealth of Independent States (CIS), but the concept of the CIS unified forces fell apart by the summer of 1993, as the independent states took control over the units on their territories.

The Russian Federation kept six of the seven divisions, which as of 1993 included:

- 7th Guards Airborne Division – moved from Lithuania to Novorossiysk.
- 44th Training Airborne Division – moved from Lithuania to Omsk.
- 76th Guards Airborne Division (Pskov Oblast)
- 98th Guards Airborne Division – moved from Ukraine to Ivanovo. Part of it stayed and became the nucleus of the 1st Airmobile Division, Ukrainian Airmobile Forces.
- 104th Guards Airborne Division – moved from Azerbaijan to Ulyanovsk.
- 106th Guards Airborne Division (Tula and Ryazan)

The remaining division, the 103rd Guards Airborne Division, became part of the Belarusian Ground Forces.

Russia also received seven of the sixteen Soviet airborne and air assault brigades, and some additional units, which included:

- 11th Guards Air Assault Brigade (Ulan-Ude)
- 13th Air Assault Brigade (Magdagachi and Zavitinsk)
- 21st Air Assault Brigade (Stavropol)
- 36th Air Assault Brigade (Garbolovo)
- 37th Airborne Brigade (Chernyakhovsk)
- 56th Guards Air Assault Brigade (Kamyshin)
- 83rd Guards Air Assault Brigade (Ussuriysk)
- 345th Guards Airborne Regiment (Gudauta, Abkhazia)
- 196th Communications Regiment (Moscow Oblast)

In the early 1990s the active Russian Airborne Forces had five divisions and eight brigades, and a total strength of 64,300 personnel. Each division had a strength of 6,000 men. The two main training establishments of the VDV were in Ryazan and Omsk: the Ryazan Guards Higher Airborne Command School and the 242nd Training Center of the Airborne Forces, which was formed in Omsk on the basis of the training division.

=== Early developments and wars ===
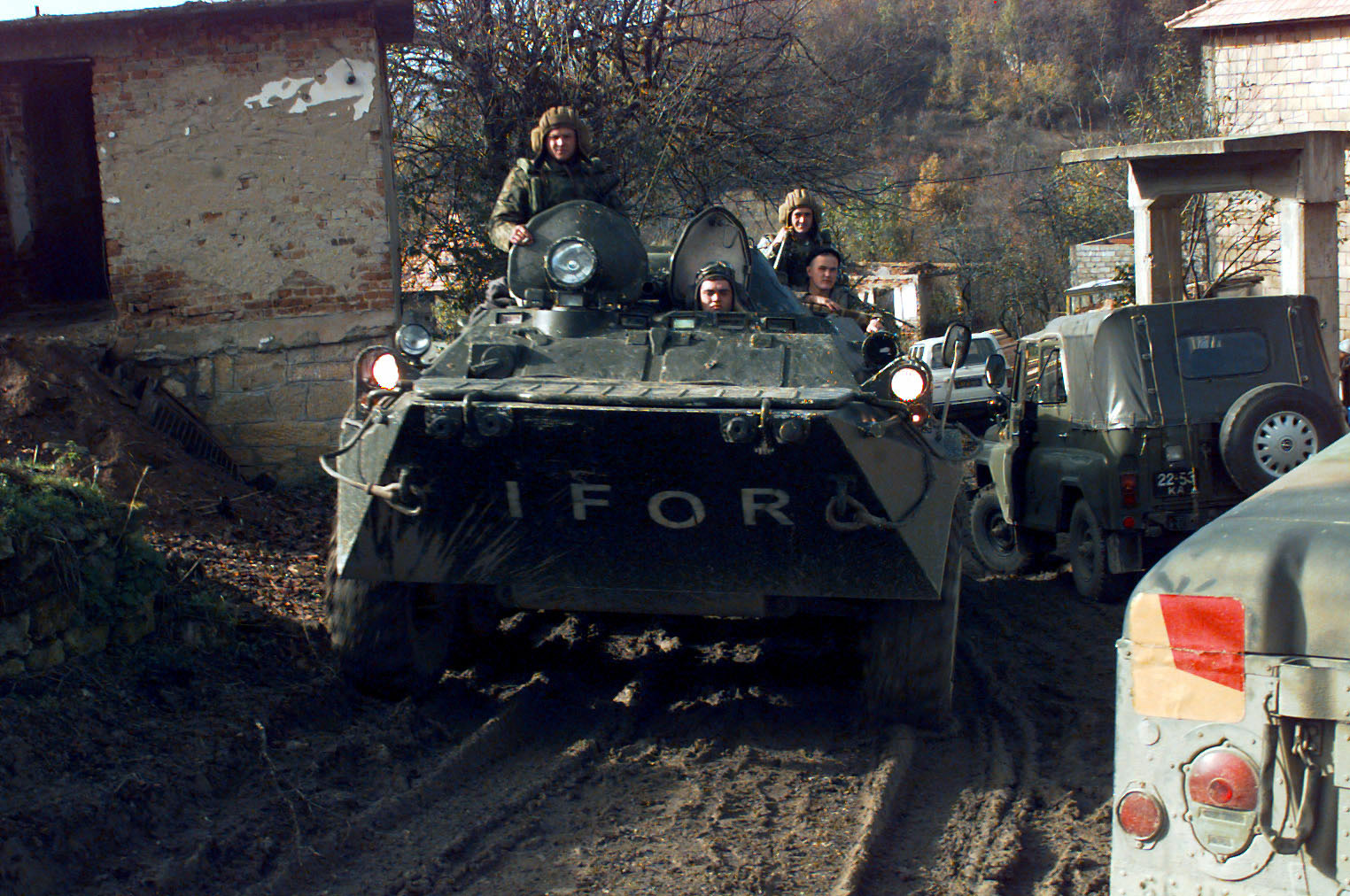
Russian paratroopers on patrol in Bosnia as members of the Implementation Force, 1996

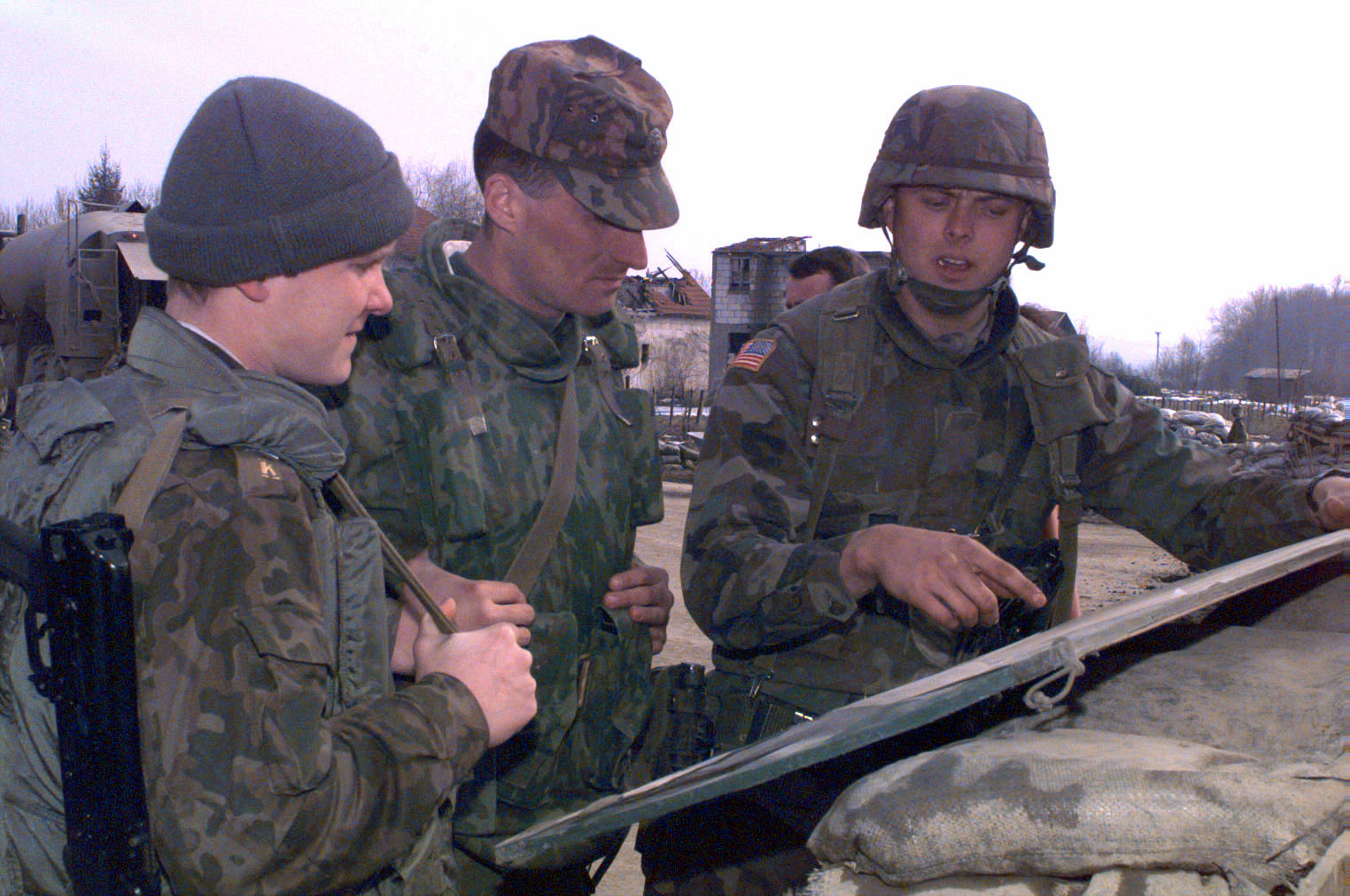
A VDV paratrooper and a US Army soldier in Bosnia, 1996

In 1992, during the fall of Kabul to the mujahadeen, elements of the 106th Guards Airborne Division carried out the successful evacuation of the former Soviet embassy staff from Kabul, Afghanistan, along with the Chinese and Mongolian embassy staffs. A paratrooper of the VDV who was involved in the mission became one of the first recipients of the title Hero of Russia. Several units of the VDV were also used to maintain order in Moldova after the Transnistria War, and the former Soviet forces in that country were commanded by General Alexander Lebed, an airborne officer. Before the withdrawal of the 104th GAD from Azerbaijan in 1993, its members had been involved in skirmishes with the local Azeri population, and some members of another VDV unit joined Armenian militias that fought in the First Nagorno-Karabakh War. One airborne battalion in Georgia fought off an attack by local nationalists during the Georgian Civil War, and other airborne units were involved in helping maintain ceasefires during and after the Georgian-Ossetian and Georgian-Abkhazian wars between 1992 and 1993.

In the early 1990s, General Pavel Grachev, an Airborne Forces general who served as the first Russian Defence Minister from 1992 to 1996, planned for the VDV to form the core of the planned Mobile Forces. This was announced in Krasnaya Zvezda, the Ministry of Defence's daily newspaper, in July 1992. From December 1993, the Mobile Forces were to consist of an Immediate Reaction Force that could be deployed in 4-10 hours, and a Rapid Response Force that could be deployed in three days. It was expected that the VDV, which Grachev saw as the reliable core of the Russian military, would provide 60 percent of these forces. However, the Mobile Forces plan was never enacted. The number of formations available for the force was far less than anticipated, since much of the Airborne Forces had been 'nationalised' by the republics their units had been previously based in, and other arms of service, such as the GRU and Military Transport Aviation, who were to provide the airlift component, were adamantly opposed to ceding control of their forces.

The end of the Cold War brought up questions about the continued role and purpose of the Airborne Forces. With the possibility of large airborne operations unlikely (the VDV had not carried out a parachute assault since World War II), there were proposals to disband it or absorb its units into other service branches. As a strategic reserve, the VDV was also outside the control of military district commanders. It did provide a rapid response force that could quickly be deployed to conflict zones by aircraft faster than regular Ground Forces units. Another role of the VDV in the 1990s was also peacekeeping. In 1992 the 554th Separate Russian Battalion was formed from the 137th Guards Airborne Regiment and underwent training in Ryazan before being deployed to eastern Croatia as a peacekeeping unit with the UN mission during the Croatian War of Independence. It became the first Russian unit created for peacekeeping operations and consisted entirely of contract soldiers rather than conscripts. A new VDV formation was also established in 1994, the 45th Spetsnaz Regiment.

The Airborne Forces took part in the First Chechen War from December 1994 to August 1996. The joint army groups that carried out the ground campaign in the Battle of Grozny at the start of the war had elements of the 76th, 98th, 104th, and 106th GAD. They and the other Russian forces took significant casualties in the urban combat. One of the groups was commanded by the VDV general Nikolai Staskov, who was nearly killed by a grenade during the fighting in Grozny. The Battle of Vedeno, in late May and early June 1995, saw an airborne assault that was deployed by helicopter, and resulted in the capture of positions held by Chechen militants. In August 1999 a group of rebels led by the Chechen commander Shamil Basayev attempted to invade neighboring Dagestan, but Interior Ministry troops supported by the Ministry of Defense, with VDV units being the first to arrive, repelled the attack. The Second Chechen War from September 1999 to August 2000 also involved the VDV and was much more successful than the first war. On this occasion, all of the airborne troops involved were part their own army group.

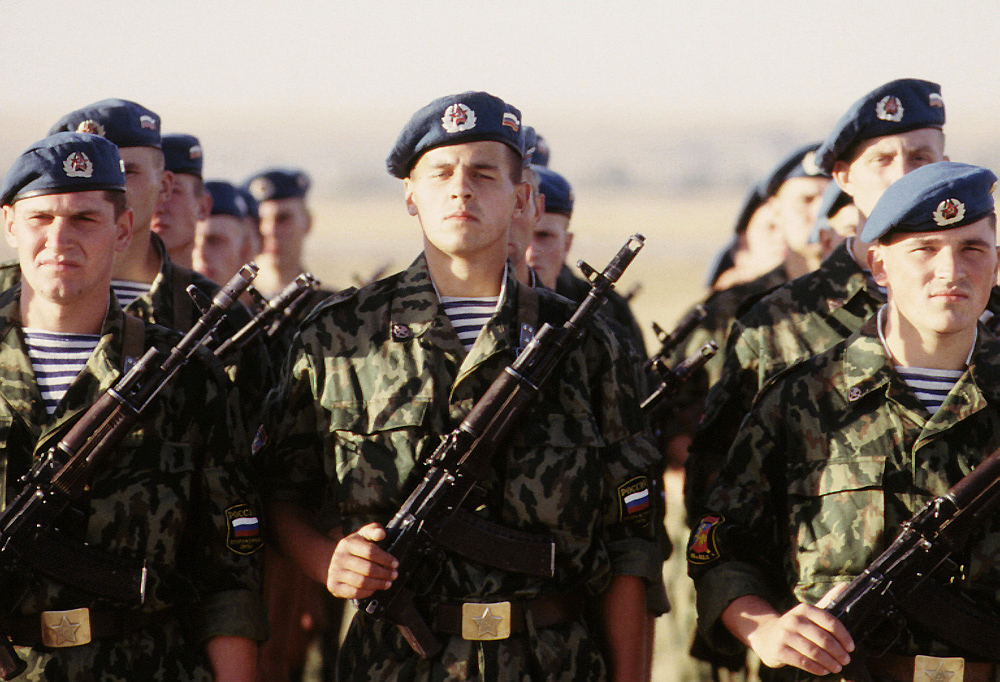
Paratroopers of the 106th Guards Airborne Division in Kazakhstan, 1999

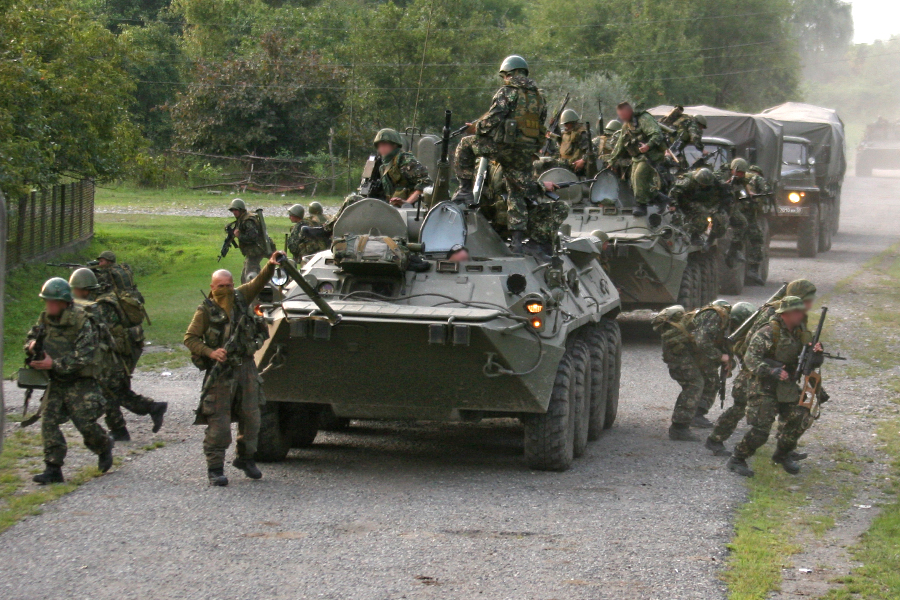
VDV spetsnaz in Georgia during the Russo-Georgian War, 2008

At the end of the Bosnian War in late 1995 the United States wanted Russia to participate in the NATO Implementation Force (IFOR) that was deployed to ensure that the Dayton Accord was followed. The 1st Separate Airborne Brigade was established for this purpose, from units of the 76th and 98th GAD, and arrived in Bosnia in January 1996, to be part of Multi-National Division North. The Russian brigade, led by Colonel Alexander Lentsov, was under the tactical control of William L. Nash, U.S. 1st Armored Division commander, and the operational control of NATO supreme commander George Joulwan through a Russian general, Leonty Shevtsov, his deputy for Russian forces. Russian and American soldiers worked alongside each other in the first joint operation between Russia and the countries of NATO since World War II. The brigade participate in the NATO mission, which became the Stabilization Force (SFOR), until 2003.

Although during Pavel Grachev's tenure as Minister of Defense the Russian armed forces had been reduced by 1.1 million troops, these changes initially had no effect on the VDV. But in December 1995 he ordered two airborne divisions and four air assault brigades to be put under the command of military districts, and when Grachev was replaced by Igor Rodionov in 1996, a Ground Forces officer, he continued to reduce the size of the VDV. In the end the decision was made to reduce the VDV to about one-third of its strength at the time. After Rodionov's reforms, as of 1997, the Airborne Forces headquarters had under its command four divisions, while all of the brigades were either reorganized into smaller units or transferred to the command of the Ground Forces. The four divisions that remained were the 7th, 76th, 98th, and 106th. In 1998 the 104th Division was reorganized as the 31st Guards Air Assault Brigade. The 76th Division was converted into an air assault from an airborne division in 1998, and the 7th Division also was made an air assault division in 2006, in addition to getting a "mountain" designation.

Several brigades were disbanded: the 13th, 36th, and 37th Brigades in 1996 and the 21st and 56th Brigades in 1997. The remaining brigades – 11th, 31st, 83rd – were transferred to the command of the Ground Forces from 1996 until 2013. In 2009 the 56th Brigade was restored. The reforms in the second half of the 1990s brought the total strength of the VDV from 64,300 to 48,500, and by the late 2000s it was down to 35,000. However, Georgy Shpak, who was the commander of the Russian Airborne Forces from 1996 to 2003, prevented the Chief of the General Staff, Anatoly Kvashnin, from making the VDV part of the Ground Forces. One of his successors, Valery Yevtukhovich, the commander from 2007 to 2009, was forced to retire early over his disagreement with the Chief at that time, Nikolai Makarov, about the Airborne Forces.

During the Russo-Georgian War in 2008, two regiments of the 76th GAAD and one from the 98th GAD were involved. The 76th was rapidly deployed into Georgia's South Ossetia region ahead of the Russian main force, the 58th Army of the Ground Forces, along with the 45th Spetsnaz Regiment. Elements of the 7th Division entered Abkhazia. Despite some problems with their equipment, the VDV achieved its objectives.

=== Post-2008 reform ===
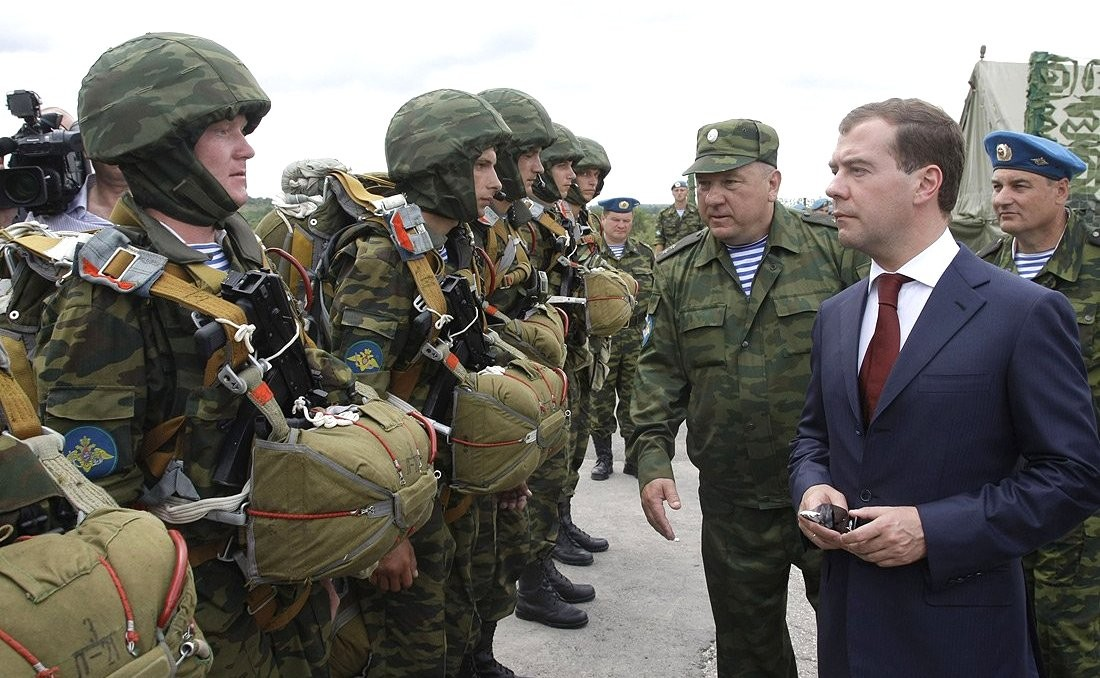
President Dmitry Medvedev and General Shamanov inspecting the 7th Guards Mountain Air Assault Division, 2009

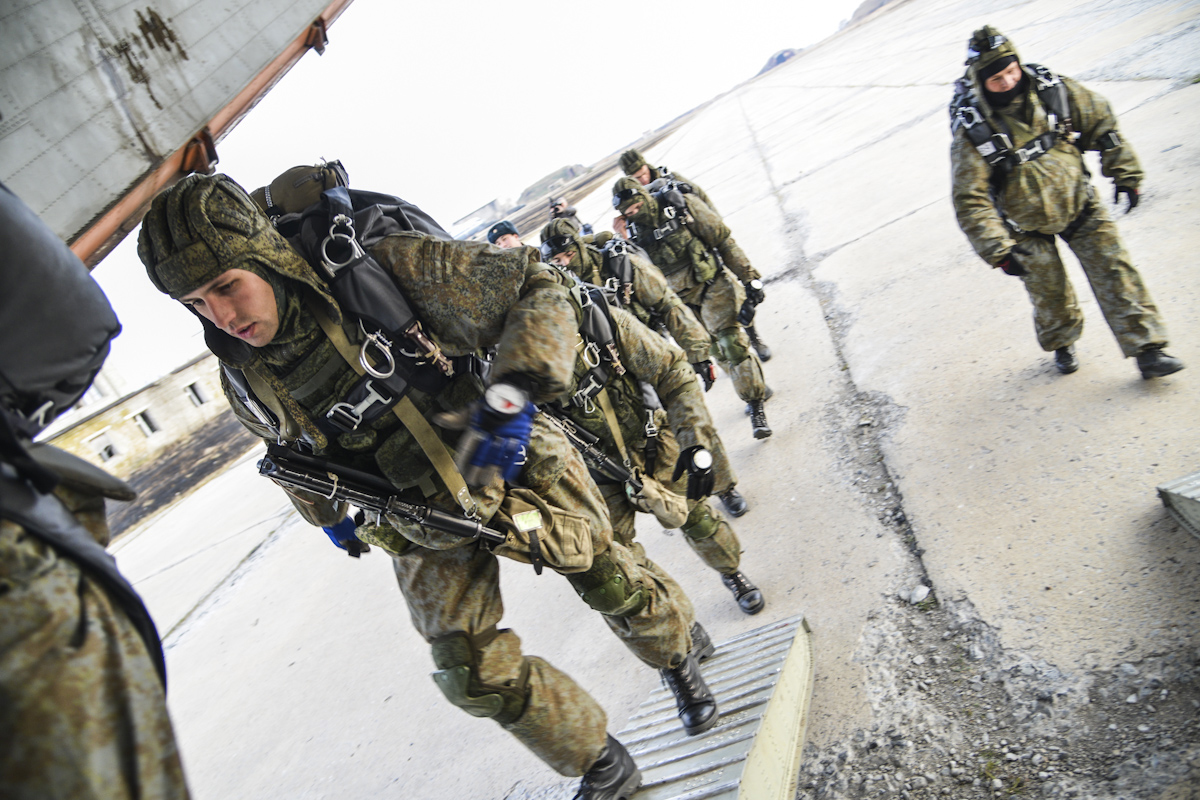
Boarding an Il-76 during an exercise of the 83rd Separate Guards Air Assault Brigade in 2017

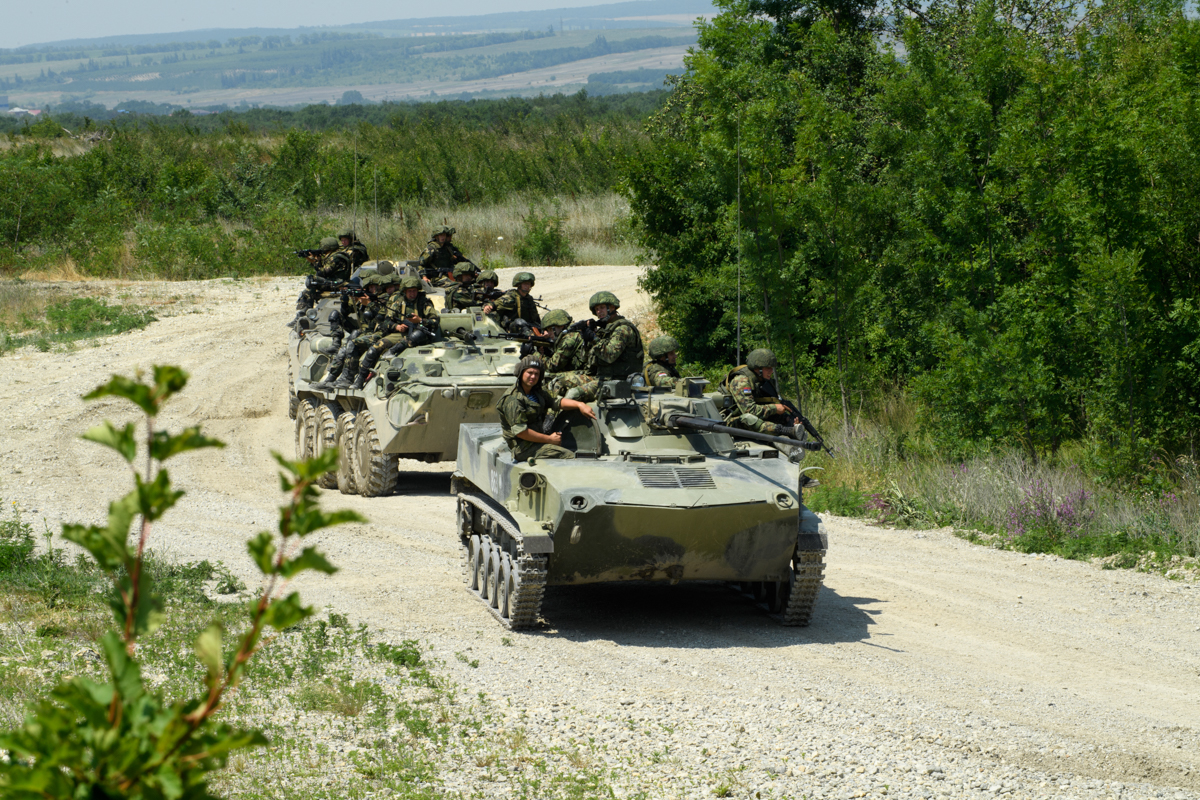
Paratroopers on BMD-2 vehicles at the Slavic Brotherhood 2018 exercise

In May 2009 Lieutenant General Vladimir Shamanov became the commander of the VDV. He was a veteran of the Soviet–Afghan War and had overseen the successful second Chechen campaign. Under the 2008 reform programme, the four existing two-regiment divisions should have been transformed into 7–8 air-assault brigades. However, once General Shamanov became commander of the Airborne Forces, it was decided to keep the original structure. The divisions were strengthened, becoming four independent airborne/air-assault brigades, one for each military district. In 2010, the VDV deputy commander, Major General Alexander Lentsov, said that the service would remain a separate combat arm, but there was a possibility that it would become part of the Special Operations Forces after 2016.

In October 2013 it was reported that the three airborne brigades under military district control (apparently the 11th and 83rd (Ulan-Ude and Ussuriysk) in the Eastern Military District and the 56th at Kamyshin in the Southern Military District) would be returned to VDV command. The process was completed by July 2015. In October 2013, Commander of the VDV Vladimir Shamanov announced that a new air assault brigade would be formed in Voronezh in 2016 with the number of the 345th Guards Airborne Regiment. The establishment of the brigade was postponed to 2017–18, according to a June 2015 announcement. It was announced in July 2015 that plans called for the 31st Airborne Brigade to be expanded into the 104th Guards Airborne Division by 2023, and for an additional airborne regiment to be attached to each division.

In the mid-2010s, the Russian Airborne Forces consisted of four divisions and six brigades, including:

- 7th Guards Mountain Air Assault Division
- 76th Guards Air Assault Division
- 98th Guards Airborne Division
- 106th Guards Airborne Division
- 11th Guards Air Assault Brigade
- 31st Guards Air Assault Brigade
- 56th Guards Air Assault Brigade
- 83rd Guards Air Assault Brigade
- 45th Guards Spetsnaz Brigade
- 38th Guards Communications Brigade

By 2021 the total personnel of the VDV was 45,000.

Elements of the 76th Guards Air Assault Division's 104th Guards Air Assault Regiment allegedly participated in the war in Donbas. These units allegedly were used as spearhead forces during the August 2014 DPR and LPR counteroffensive. During the August 2014 counteroffensive, battalion tactical groups of the 7th Guards Airborne Division's 247th Guards Air Assault Regiment, the 98th Guards Airborne Division's 331st Guards Airborne Regiment, the 106th Guards Airborne Division's 137th Guards Airborne Regiment, and the 31st Guards Air Assault Brigade allegedly were sent into Ukraine. Reconnaissance teams from the 45th Guards Spetznaz Brigade and the 106th's 173rd Guards Separate Reconnaissance Company were previously deployed to Ukraine alongside Ground Forces units.

In February 2016, it was reported that an airborne battalion would be permanently deployed to Dzhankoy, Crimea, in 2017–18, and upgraded to a regiment in 2020. In May 2017, Shamanov announced that the battalion would be formed at Feodosiya by 1 December 2017 as part of the 7th Guards Mountain Air Assault Division, and would be expanded into the 97th Air Assault Regiment with three battalions by late 2019. Since the 2014 annexation, the status of Crimea is under dispute between Russia and Ukraine; Ukraine and the majority of the international community considers Crimea an integral part of Ukraine, while Russia considers Crimea to be an integral part of Russia.

In August 2016, Russian paratroopers placed 1st place in the Airborne Platoon competition during the International Army Games in Russia, defeating teams from China, Iran, Belarus, and Kazakhstan.

On 4 October 2016, Colonel General Andrey Serdyukov was appointed commander of the Russian Airborne Forces, replacing Shamanov, who became chief of the Duma Committee on Defense.

State tests of a new Bakhcha-U-PDS parachute platform for the BMD-4M and BTR-MDM vehicles were completed in May 2018. Deliveries of new 'heavy drop' systems PBS-950U and PBS-955 began in 2020. In 2019, two battalion sets of BMD-4M airborne combat vehicles and BTR-MDM Rakushka armored personnel carriers, more than 200 units of various automotive equipment, including special armored vehicles, army snowmobiles, four-wheelers and buggies and more than 9,000 parachute systems D-10 and "Arbalet-2" were delivered to the troops.

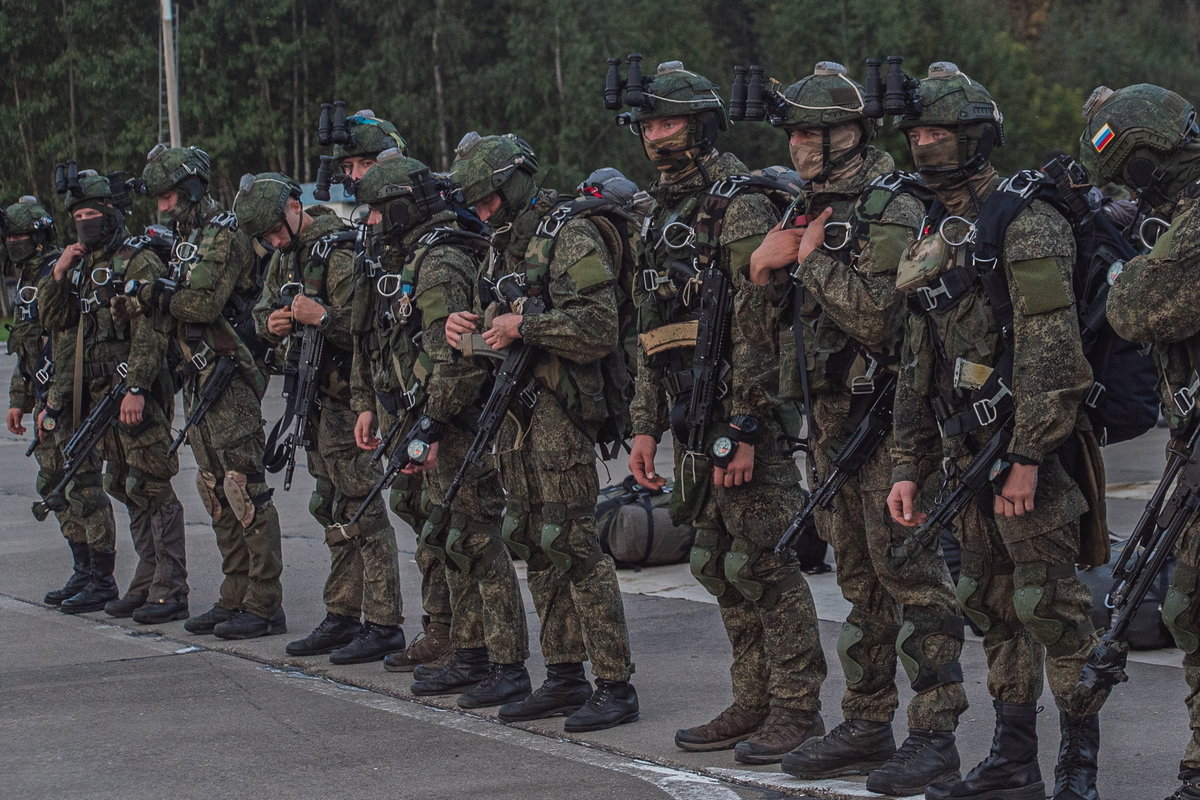
Paratroopers of the 45th Guards Spetsnaz Brigade during the Zapad 2021 exercise

In April 2020, military personnel from the Russian Airborne Forces, performed the world's first HALO paradrop from the lower border of the Arctic stratosphere. The Russian commando group used "next-generation special-purpose parachute system", military-tested oxygen equipment, navigation devices, special equipment, and uniforms. This was the first high-altitude landing in the Arctic latitudes over 10 km in the history of Russian aviation.

As part of its mission in the Arctic region, the aircrew provided landing of airborne units from altitudes of between 10 and 1.8 kilometres, as well as landing of cargo with a total weight of about 18 tons. After conducting practical combat training, the Il-76 aircrews landed at the Nagurskoe airfield in the northern part of the island of Franz Josef Land. The high-altitude landing was dedicated to the 75th anniversary of victory in the Great Patriotic war of 1941–1945, and the 90th anniversary of the formation of the Airborne troops.

In 2020, the VDV continued to modernize and re-equip its command posts, started to receive the Stayer high-altitude parachute system which enable airdrops from up to 10 km altitude, and completed receiving special-purpose controllable parachute systems.

Two air assault regiments were set up in Pskov and Crimea as part of air assault divisions in 2021. The Russian Defense Ministry also accepted the Zavet-D artillery fire control vehicle for the Airborne Forces. In 2021–2022, the Airborne Forces received about 30,000 sets of landing equipment and parachute systems. Sergey Shoigu claimed in September 2023 that VDV have received more than 2,000 hardware units and 5,500 landing means and also a new airborne regiment formed since the beginning of the year. The Russian Ministry of Defense said on 1 January 2024 that the VDV received during the past year over 2,500 units of weapons, military and special equipment, including more than 780 samples of "newest and contemporary ones". Among the newest samples were T-90M tanks and BMD-4M IFVs as well as BTR-MDM "Rakushka" and BTR-82A APCs. It was also reported on 3 January that 20 military units were created in 2023, including the Ulyanovsk air assault division. About 16,000 landing means were also reportedly delivered and 1,000 more in the first quarter of 2024.

=== Russian invasion of Ukraine ===
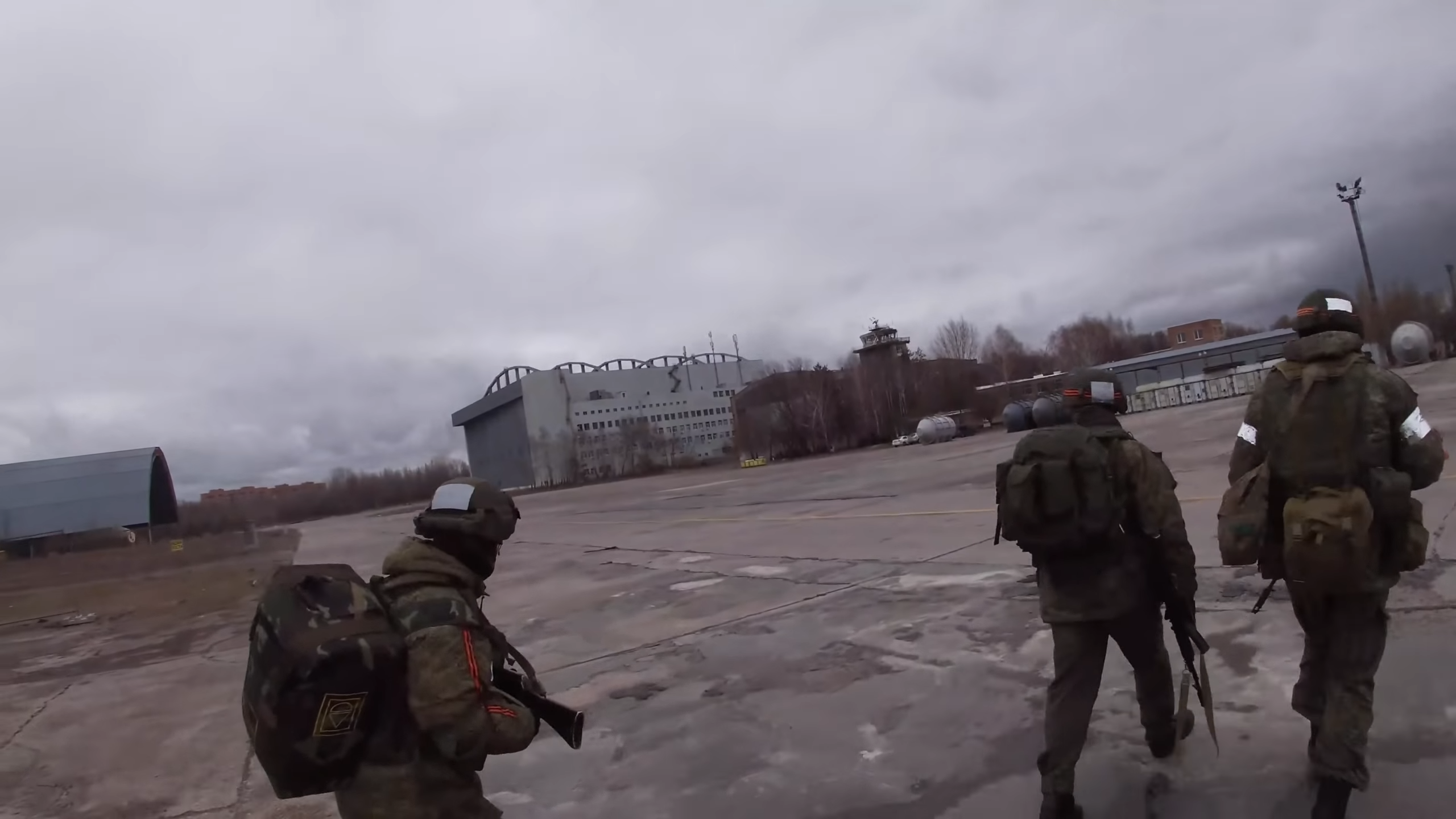
VDV Airborne troops at Hostomel Airport during the Battle of Antonov Airport

VDV Airborne troops attacking a Ukrainian drone during the Battle of the Svatove–Kreminna line

The VDV participated heavily in the Russian invasion of Ukraine. In the opening hours of the invasion the VDV attempted to secure key airports and support assaults around Ukraine. These paratroopers were recognizable by the orange-and-black Saint George ribbons decorating their helmets and arms. Three air assault operations were carried out: in the northern direction, the Hostomel Airport northwest of Kyiv, and in the southern direction, Antonov Bridge over the Dneiper river east of Kherson, and the Kakhovka Dam and Bridge. Of the three, the latter two operations were successful in capturing their objective.

The VDV attempted to paradrop and transport troops with Mi-8 and Mi-17 helicopters and take the Hostomel Airport in northern Kyiv, in order to use the airport to airlift more troops and heavy equipment to take Kyiv as a form of forward "air bridge" that would enable rapid deployment of Russian forces far in advance of the Russian land front, in an action that became known as the Battle of Antonov Airport. The VDV troops had initial success on the first day against the Ukrainian National Guard, but then engaged the 4th Rapid Reaction Brigade, which with the help of the Ukrainian Air Force encircled the unsupported VDV troops and recaptured the airport, with the Russians escaping to nearby woods. The next day battle resumed, and the VDV again attempted to land troops at the airport. Deploying around 200 helicopters and with support from the Ground Forces arriving from the north (Belarus and Chernobyl), they finally broke through the Ukrainian defenses and established Russian control over the airport. In the end, however, the Ukrainians claimed that the airport became too damaged from the battle to be used as an airstrip.

Forty kilometers south of Kyiv in Vasylkiv, VDV paratroopers also dropped in an attempt to secure the Vasylkiv Air Base. Without any support from air or ground forces, the VDV troops in Vasylkiv were eventually encircled and were unsuccessful in achieving their objectives, giving victory in the Battle of Vasylkiv to the Ukrainians. On February 27, VDV troops with BMD-2s and BTR-Ds were seen advancing south of Hostomel in Bucha. The VDV and Ground Forces' units were hit on the same day by Bayraktar air strikes. The Ukrainian government claimed that "more than 100 units of enemy equipment were destroyed”. On the following weeks the VDV served as mechanized infantry and light infantry during the Kyiv offensive, with the 76th Guards Division and other VDV units traveling overland.

In the southern Ukraine campaign, the 7th Guards Division and 11th Guards Brigade launched the successful capture of the Antonov Bridge and the Kakhovka Dam and bridge in Kherson Oblast. During the Battle of Kharkiv, VDV paratroopers landed in Kharkiv on March 2 in an attempt to capture the contested city. They attempted a raid on a local military hospital but were repelled by local Ukrainian forces. In the fall of 2022, units of the 76th Guards Division were transferred from fighting in the battle of Donbass to fight the Kherson counteroffensive, where they stopped the advance of Ukrainian marines from the 35th Marine Brigade. According to the UK Ministry of Defence in June 2023, Russia was redeploying regular military units to the Bakhmut sector following withdrawal of Wagner forces. These included elements of the 76th and 106th VDV divisions and two additional brigades. The MoD added that the VDV was much degraded from its pre-invasion "elite" status.

As of August 2022, according to Colonel General Mikhail Teplinsky, over 5,000 VDV paratroopers have been decorated for distinguished service during operations in Ukraine, and 17 of them became Heroes of the Russian Federation. In August 2025, he said that over 100,000 decorations have been awarded to VDV servicemen, and 99 have become Heroes of the Russian Federation. Two divisions, two brigades and one regiment participated in restoring control over Kursk Oblast, and later entered Ukraine's Sumy Oblast, while the 98th Guards Division took part in finishing the battle of Chasiv Yar, and the 7th Guards Division was fighting in the Zaporozhye Oblast.

==== Analysis of losses ====
On 3 March 2022, it was reported that Major General Andrei Sukhovetsky of the VDV's 7th Guards Mountain Air Assault Division, who was the appointed deputy commander of the 41st Combined Arms Army, was killed in action in Ukraine. His death is attributed to sniper fire either near Mariupol (which was besieged by Russian forces) or Hostomel during the Kyiv offensive. Ukrainian sources said he was killed on 2 March and his death was first confirmed on VKontakte by "Combat Brotherhood", a Russian veterans group, and later by President Vladimir Putin. The VDV suffered similar losses in Bucha and Irpin with poor command and control being cited. The VDV also joined the assault on the city of Mykolaiv during the Battle of Mykolaiv, but were pushed back by a Ukrainian counter-offensive.

On 18 March it was reported that Colonel Sergei Sukharev along with deputy Major Sergei Krylov of the 331st Guards Airborne Regiment had been killed during fighting in Mariupol.

In late April, Bellingcat journalist Christo Grozev claimed that he "personally checked" and that Russia had lost "almost 90% of its best paratroopers" in the first echelon of the invasion. Many helicopters were shot down by Ukrainian defenses, and the paratroopers were stranded without armored vehicles or air support. In early May, the UK MoD stated that the VDV units and other elite forces had suffered high losses and that it would "probably take years for Russia to reconstitute these forces."

On 19 June 2022, it was reported by Odesa military-civilian spokesperson Serhiy Bratchuk that Putin had sacked Serdyukov for his doomed bid to take Hostomel airfield, which few of the invading soldiers survived. This was confirmed by Russian media reports. He was replaced by Colonel General Mikhail Teplinsky.

According to BBC News Russian and the Mediazona news website, 1,937 VDV deaths had been documented by the end of August 2023, which included 340 officers, accounting for 6% of the 31,665 Russian fatalities who had been identified by name, and 8% of those who could identified by both name and service branch.

UK intelligence estimate that around 30,000 paratroop forces were deployed to Ukraine in 2022 and that 50% of those have been killed or wounded by summer 2023. A Russian General in August 2023 stated that 3,500 wounded paratroopers had refused to leave the front for treatment and 5,000 had returned to the front after treatment.

As of 8 May 2025, at least 401 BMD-2, 171 BMD-4M, 105 BTR-D, and 12 unknown BTR-D/BMD-2 have been lost in the invasion.

==== Wartime expansion ====
Despite claims of 'devastating' and 'crippling' losses, the VDV expanded during the war. After the invasion it was announced that the Airborne Forces would create two new divisions. Teplinsky announced on August 2, 2023 that the VDV is expanding the 31st Air Assault Brigade into the 104th Guards Air Assault Division. The 299th and 119th Parachute Regiments were also reestablished, expanding two other divisions from two to three regiments.

Also reported was the creation of a new 52nd Artillery Brigade, the first unit of its type in the VDV, and the 44th Air Assault Division, created on the basis of the 111th and 387th Motor Rifle Regiments of the 1st Army Corps of the Donetsk People's Republic. The 44th Air Assault Division recalls the number of the Soviet-era 44th Training Airborne Division, but being from newly-formed motor rifle regiments, it was described as being an air assault unit "in name only" by military analysts.

== Structure ==
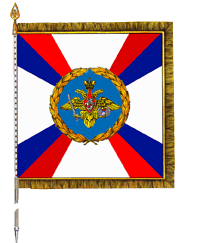
Banner of the Airborne Forces Commander.

The Airborne Forces Command answers to the General Staff of the Armed Forces of the Russian Federation and is responsible for the organization, development, training of the VDV, as well as the planning and implementation of operations involving VDV units. The Command includes the following senior officials, and the titles and the number of the deputy commanders have changed over the years, but as of June 2023 they include:

- Commander Airborne Forces – Colonel-General Mikhail Teplinsky
- Chief of Staff and First Deputy Commander Airborne Forces – Major-General Aleksandr Kornev
- Deputy Commander Airborne Forces for Peacekeeping Operations and Collective Rapid Reaction Forces – Lieutenant-General Andrei Kholzakov
- Deputy Commander Airborne Forces – Major-General Nikolai Choban
- Deputy Commander Airborne Forces for Airborne Training – Major-General Alexander Vyaznikov
- Deputy Commander Airborne Forces for Armaments – Major-General Alexei Ragozin
- Deputy Commander Airborne Forces for Combat Training – Major-General Sergei Volyk
- Deputy Commander Airborne Forces for Military-Political Work – Major-General Viktor Kupshichin
- Deputy Commander Airborne Forces for Material-Technical Support - Major-General Nariman Timergazin
- Deputy Commander Airborne Forces for Construction and Quartering – Major-General Leonid Shevchenko

=== Organization ===
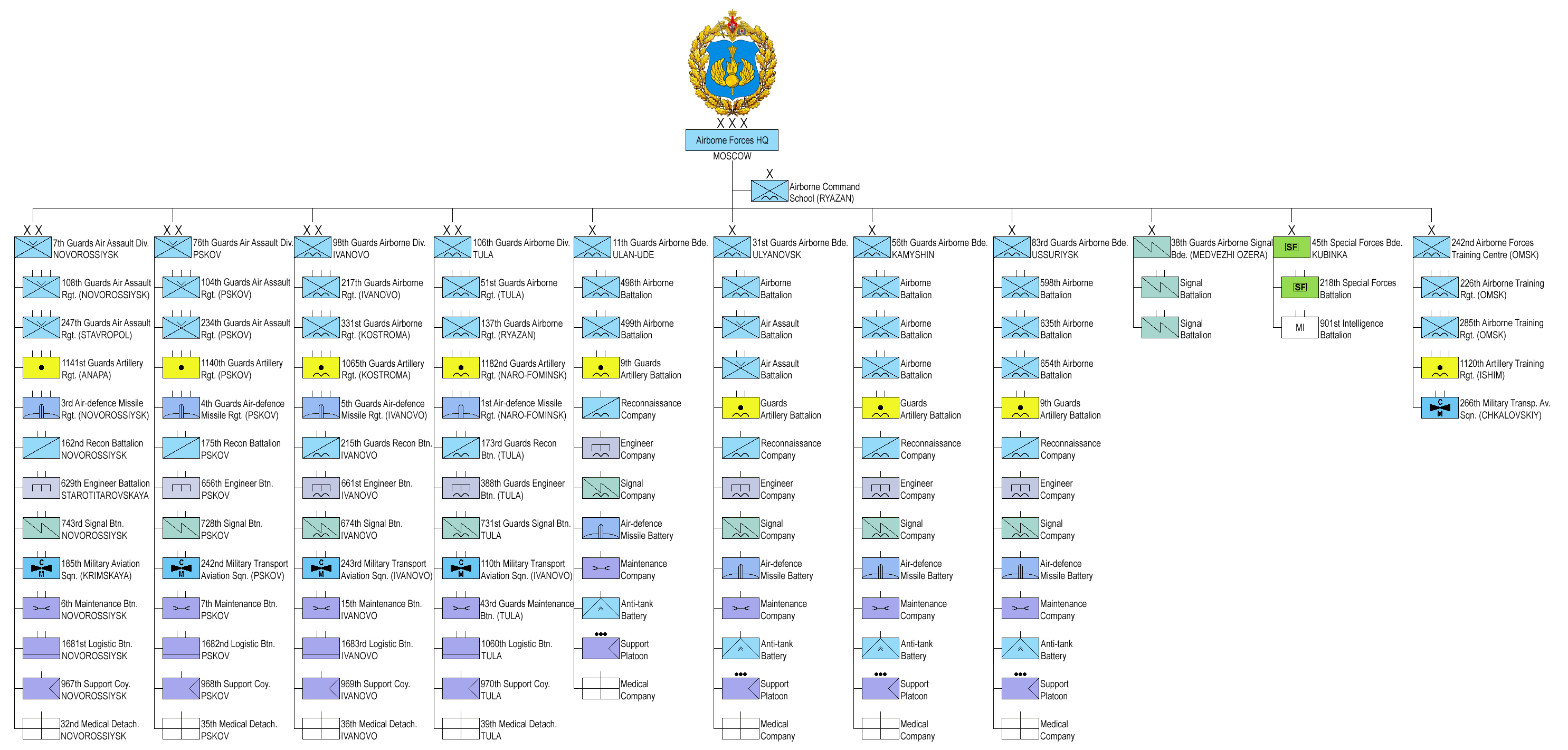
The structure of the Russian Airborne Forces (pre-2022)

The Air Landing Forces combine Parachute Landing (парашютно-десантные) and Landing Assault (десантно-штурмовые) units. The difference between the two is that while both were airborne qualified and mechanised with BMD, BTR-D, 2S9 Nona, the parachute landing units are lighter (only quarter mechanised) and play the role of entry element, while landing assault units were fully mechanised and were intended to develop the breach opened by the parachute landing forces.

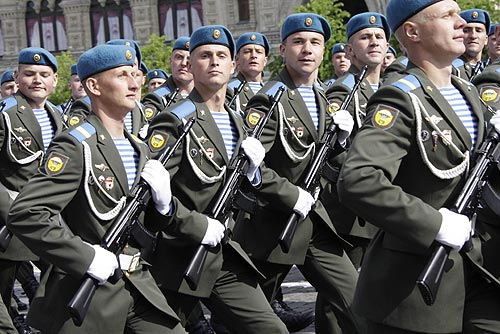
Paratroopers at the 2008 Moscow Victory Day Parade

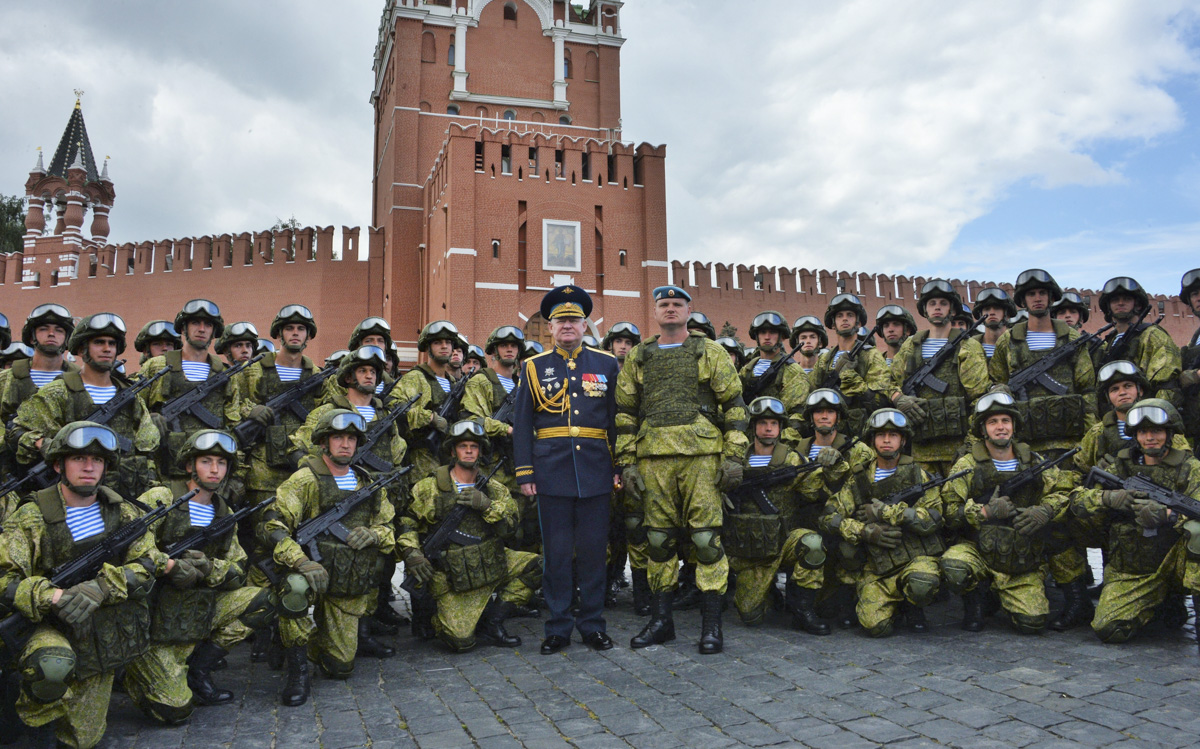
Airborne Forces commander Andrey Serdyukov in front of Spasskaya Bashnya on Paratroopers' Day in 2020

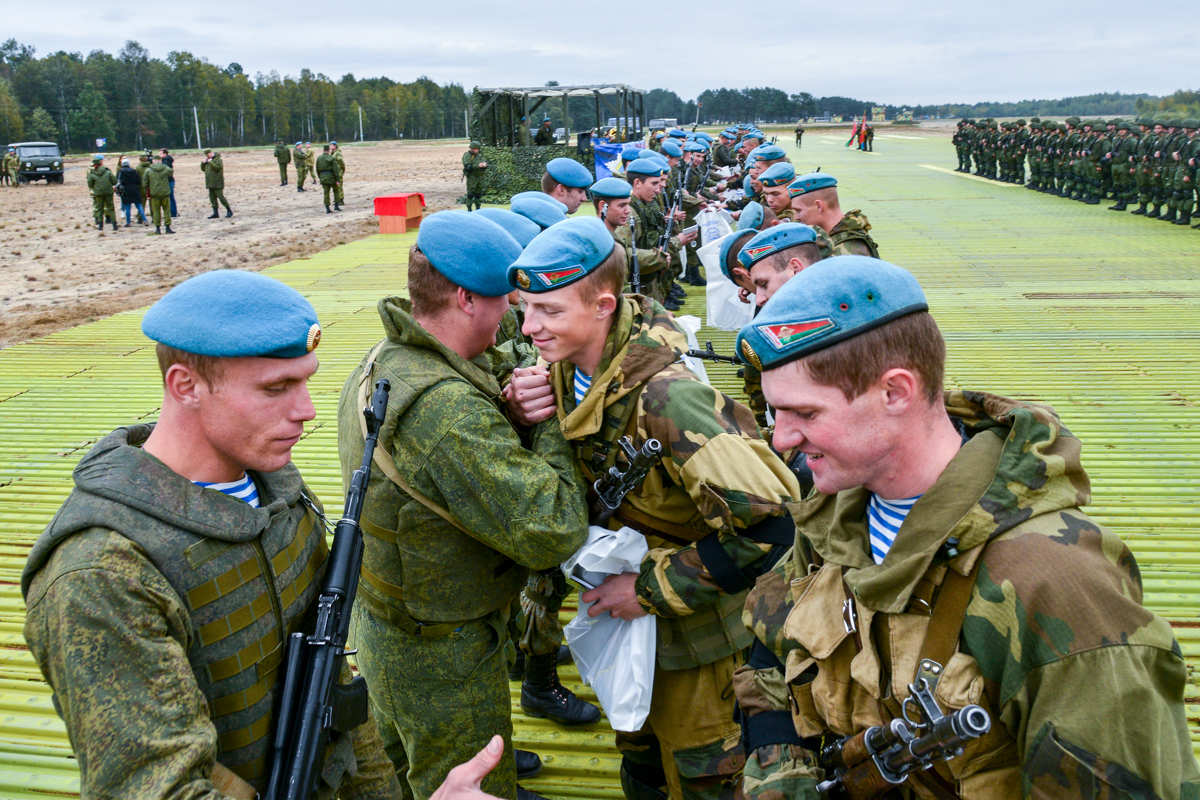
The VDV has a close working relationship with the Belarusian 38th Guards Air Assault Brigade

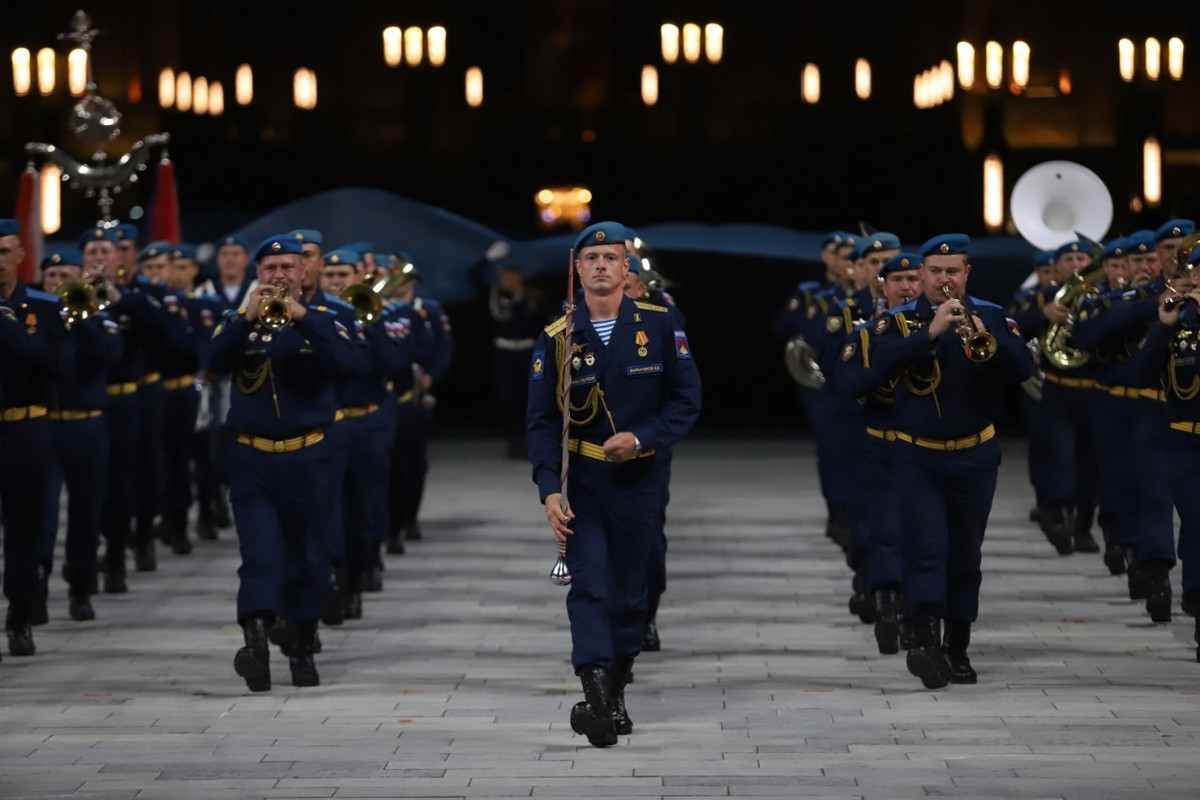
The combined band

Composition of the Russian Airborne Forces 2024
Airborne Forces Command		Moscow	Commander Col. Gen. Mikhail Teplinsky
38th Guards Command and Control Brigade	54164	Shchyolkovo, Moscow Oblast	
150th Repair and Overhaul Battalion		Orekhovo-Zuyevo, Moscow Oblast	
Ryazan Guards Higher Airborne Command School		Ryazan, Ryazan Oblast	
Ulyanovsk Guards Suvorov Military School		Ulyanovsk, Ulyanovsk Oblast	
242nd Training Centre		Omsk, Omsk Oblast	
Omsk Cadet Corps		Omsk, Omsk Oblast	
309th Center for Specialized Parachute Training		Ryazan, Ryazan Oblast	
7th Guards Mountain Air Assault Division: 56th Guards Air Assault Regiment; 108th Guards Kuban Cossack Air Assault Regiment; 247th Guards Air Assault Regiment; 1141st Guards Artillery Regiment; 3rd Guards Anti-Aircraft Missile Regiment	61756: unknown; 42091; 54801; 40515; 94021	Novorossiysk, Krasnodar Krai: Feodosia, Crimea; Novorossiysk, Krasnodar Krai; Stavropol, Krasnodar Krai; Anapa, Krasnodar Krai; Novorossiysk, Krasnodar Krai	
44th Air Assault Division: 111th Motorized Rifle Regiment; 387th Motorized Rifle Regiment		Zaporozhye Oblast	
76th Guards Air Assault Division: 104th Guards Air Assault Regiment; 234th Guards Air Assault Regiment; 237th Guards Air Assault Regiment; 1140th Guards Artillery Regiment; 4th Guards Anti-Aircraft Missile Regiment	07264: 32515; 74268; 12865; 45377; unknown	Pskov, Pskov Oblast: Cheryokha, Pskov Oblast; Pskov, Pskov Oblast; Pskov, Pskov Oblast; Pskov, Pskov Oblast; unknown	
98th Guards Airborne Division: 217th Guards Airborne Regiment; 299th Guards Airborne Regiment; 331st Guards Airborne Regiment; 1065th Guards Artillery Regiment; 5th Guards Anti-Aircraft Missile Regiment	65451: 62295; unknown; 71211; 62297; unknown	Ivanovo, Ivanovo Oblast: Ivanovo, Ivanovo Oblast; unknown; Kostroma, Kostroma Oblast; Kostroma, Kostroma Oblast; Ivanovo, Ivanovo Oblast	
104th Guards Airborne Division: 328th Guards Airborne Regiment; 337th Guards Airborne Regiment; 345th Guards Airborne Regiment; 2nd Anti-Aircraft Missile Regiment; 1180th Artillery Regiment	73612: 01011; 51854; 33702; 55256; 02364	Ulyanovsk, Ulyanovsk Oblast	
106th Guards Airborne Division: 51st Guards Airborne Regiment; 119th Guards Airborne Regiment; 137th Guards Airborne Regiment; 1182nd Guards Artillery Regiment; 1st Guards Anti-Aircraft Missile Regiment	55599: 33842; unknown; 41450; 93723; 71298	Tula, Tula Oblast: Tula, Tula Oblast; unknown; Ryazan, Ryazan Oblast; Naro-Fominsk, Moscow Oblast; Naro-Fominsk, Moscow Oblast	
11th Guards Airborne Brigade	32364	Ulan-Ude, Buryatia	
45th Guards Spetsnaz Brigade	28337	Kubinka, Moscow Oblast	
52nd Guards Artillery Brigade			
83rd Guards Airborne Brigade	71289	Ussuriysk, Primorsky Krai	
91st Mobile Material-Technical Support Brigade		Tula Oblast	

== Armament and equipment ==
Personal firearms and crew served weapons include:

- AK-74M (including upgraded variants with the KM-AK Obves modernization kit) and AKS-74 assault rifles, and AKS-74U special purpose and self-defence carbine (5.45×39mm)
- AK-12 assault rifles (5.45×39mm)
- RPK-74, light weight machinegun (5.45×39mm), now largely withdrawn from service and replaced by the PKM/PKP
- PKM, general purpose machinegun (7.62×54mmR)
- 6P41 "Pecheneg" (PKP) general purpose machine gun (7.62×54mmR), currently replacing the PKM as the general purpose machine gun throughout the Russian Armed Forces
- Dragunov SVDS, sniper rifle (7.62×54mmR)
- Dragunov SVU, modified SVD in bullpup configuration and its variants are in limited use
- SV-98, main sniper rifle (7.62×54mmR)
- ASVK-M Kord-M anti-materiel sniper rifle (12.7×108mm)
- VSS Vintorez, silenced sniper rifle (9×39mm)
- AS Val, special assault rifle
- MP-443 Grach, semi-automatic pistol (9×19mm Parabellum)
- Makarov, semi-automatic pistol (9×18mm Makarov)
- Glock 17, semi-automatic pistol (9x19 Parabellum)
- GP-25, GP-30 and GP-34, under-barrel 40 mm grenade launchers for fragmentation and gas grenades
- AGS-17 Plamya (Flame), 30 mm automatic grenade launcher
- RPO-A Shmel (Bumblebee), infantry rocket flamethrower, currently replacing the older RPO Rys (Lynx)
- RPG-7D anti-tank rocket launcher, or more modern systems such as the RPG-22 and RPG-26
- 2B14 Podnos 82 mm mortar or the 120 mm 2S12 Sani on UAZ vehicles
- 9K38 Igla man-portable SAM system, or the more modern 9K338 Igla-S
- 9K333 Verba man-portable SAM system, currently entering service
- 9K111 Fagot, 9K115 Metis and 9M133 Kornet man-portable anti-tank systems
- MTS-566 sniper rifle

The VDV are fully equipped with Barmitsa and Ratnik infantry combat suits as of 2018. Andromeda-D, Barnaul-T and Dozor automated control systems, AS-1 snowmobiles, four wheelers, a specially-created uniform for hot climates and Nanuk Arctic gear, reconnaissance-control and planning modules and the REX-1 counter-unmanned aerial vehicle rifle-like, man-portable jammer developed by Kalashnikov Group subsidiary ZALA Aero Group are also being introduced into service. Portable versions of the Garmony air defence radar, modernized reconnaissance and artillery fire control posts and Aistyonok and Sobolyatnik radars are being supplied to the VDV. The Russian Airborne Forces have also received new special-purpose controlled wing-type parachutes. VDV servicemen performing tasks in Ukraine received VKPO 3.0 all-season field uniform kits in 2023. The automatic cargo parachute system Junker-DG-250 passed acceptance trials and began to be supplied in November 2023. VDV also reportedly use the Lesochek EW system.

=== Armoured vehicles ===
There are over 1,800 armored fighting vehicles, mostly BMD-1 (since 1969), of which all but around 100 are in storage, and at least several hundred BMD-2 (since 1985). There are over 100 BMD-3 (1990) that were partially upgraded to BMD-4 level. All of them are amphibious, moving at around 10 km/h in water. The BMD-4 is capable of full, continuous fire while in deep water, unlike any other vehicle with such heavy weaponry (100 mm gun and 30 mm auto cannon). However, some units (such as those who served on peacekeeping duties in the Balkans) are known to have used BTR armored personnel carriers rather than BMD's. T-72B3 tanks supplied to the Russian Airborne Forces in 2018 have been upgraded and are equipped with Andromeda automatic control system and some of them with top-attack defence screens. As of 2021, the Russian Airborne Forces have 150 T-72B3 and 10 T-72B3 mod. 2016. T-90M tanks are also attached to VDV units as of August 2023.

There is a turret-less variant of the BMD-1, the BTR-D, which is used as troop carrier and serves as the basis for specialised versions such as anti-tank, command and signals. The BTR-D will be partially replaced by the new multi-purpose APC BTR-MD "Rakushka" that will also come in several different versions. Approximately 280 vehicles in all BTR-D configurations are in service. As part of the 2011 state defence order (GOZ), 10 BMD-4M and 10 "Rakushka's" have been ordered, but according to the VDV's CinC General Colonel Shamanov, Kurganmashzavod did not give a guarantee it would produce them.

The Russian Defense Ministry adopted the BMD-4M in April 2016. The first production batch of the new armored vehicles BMD-4M and BTR-MDM "Shell" in the amount of 24 units (12 each) transferred to the Russian Airborne Forces in 2015. The VDV equipped the first regiment with BMD-4Ms and BTR-MDMs in 2016. In 2017, they received two battalion sets of BMD-4M combat airborne vehicles and BTR-MDM APCs, over 80 Rys’ and UAZ Pickup armored automobiles.

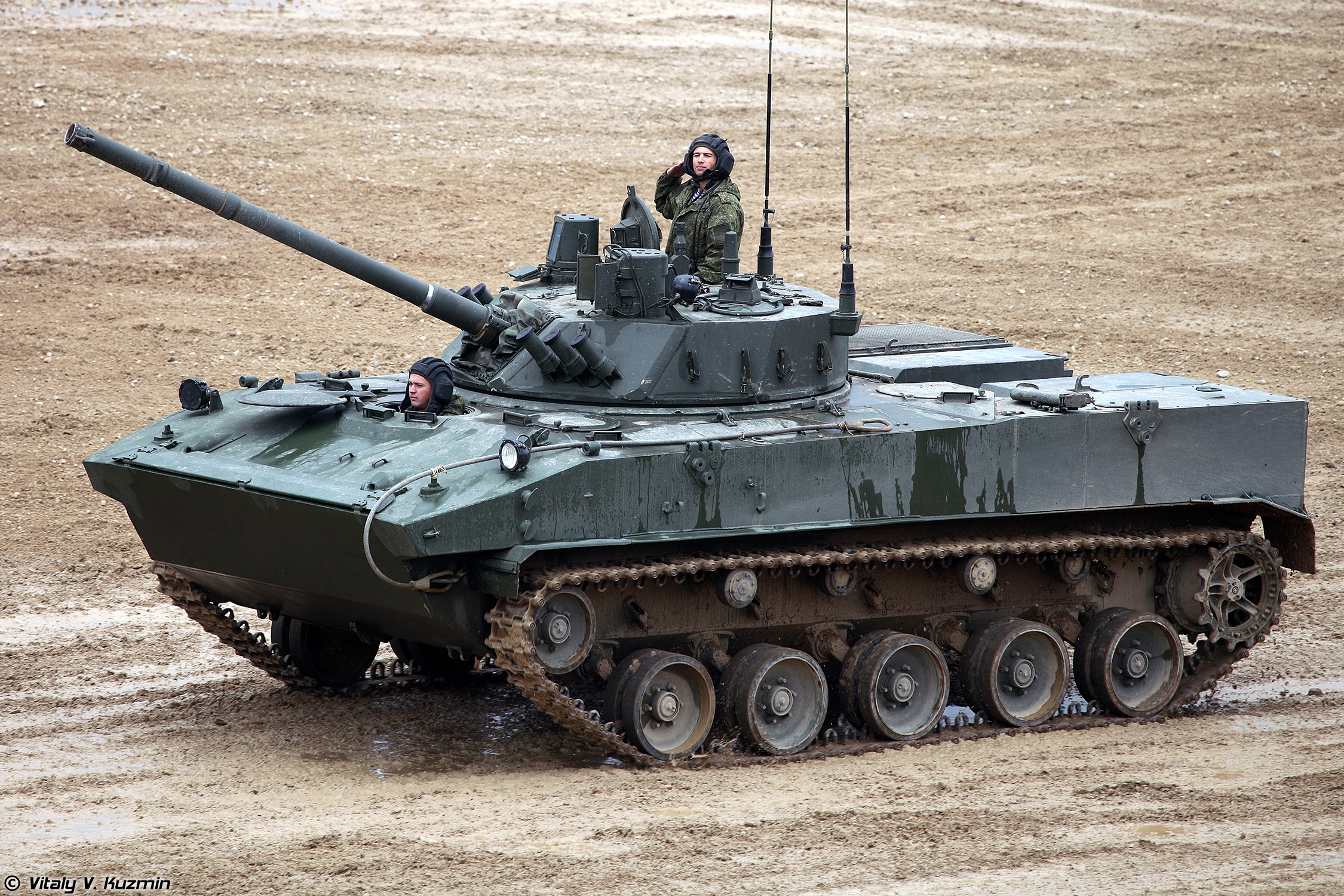
The BMD-4M

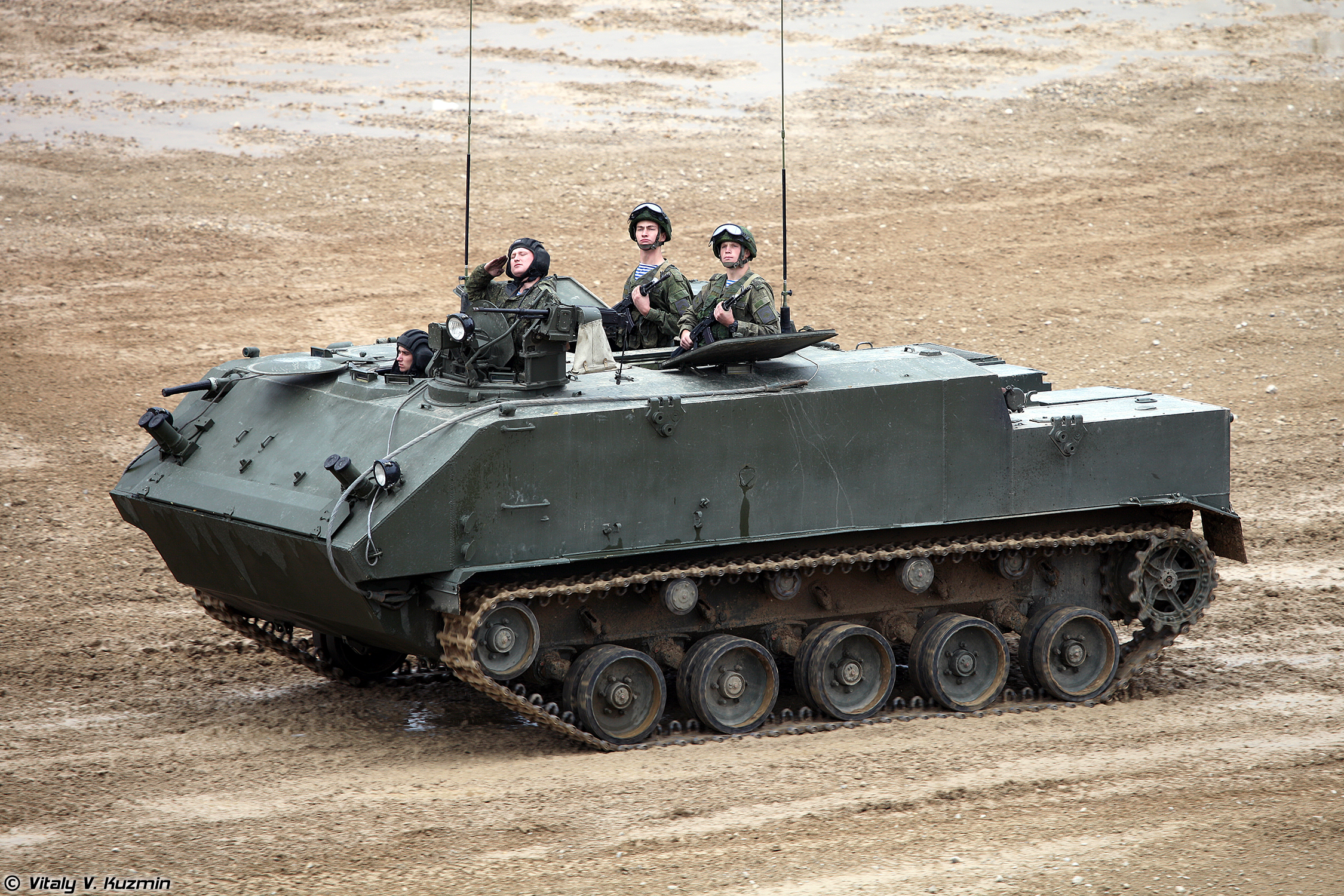
The BTR-MDM "Shell"

Russian airborne brigade-level units have received SPM-2 GAZ-233036 Tigr armored cars. They have ordered Kamaz Typhoon armored infantry transports, following modifications to meet the demands of the airborne troops and accepted them for supply in August 2021. The Russian Airborne Forces have received about 100 Tigr and Rys special armored vehicles, 200 Snegohod A-1 snow-going and AM-1 all-terrain vehicles, UAZ Patriot light motor vehicles, Toros 4x4 armored vehicles and Kamaz trucks that can be air-dropped.

The VDV currently receives Berkyt protected snowmobiles for personnel transportation and fire support in arctic conditions. Infauna and Leer-2 EW systems alongside Aileron-3SV UAVs and P-230T command vehicles are also received. The RKhM-6 chemical reconnaissance vehicle based on the BTR-80 armored personnel carrier, the BTR-D airborne assault armored personnel carrier with a ZU-23 anti-aircraft gun and the R-149MA1 and the R-142DA command and staff vehicles were demonstrated in August 2021. The Sarmat-2 light tactical buggy participated in the Zapad-2021 drill.

=== Artillery ===
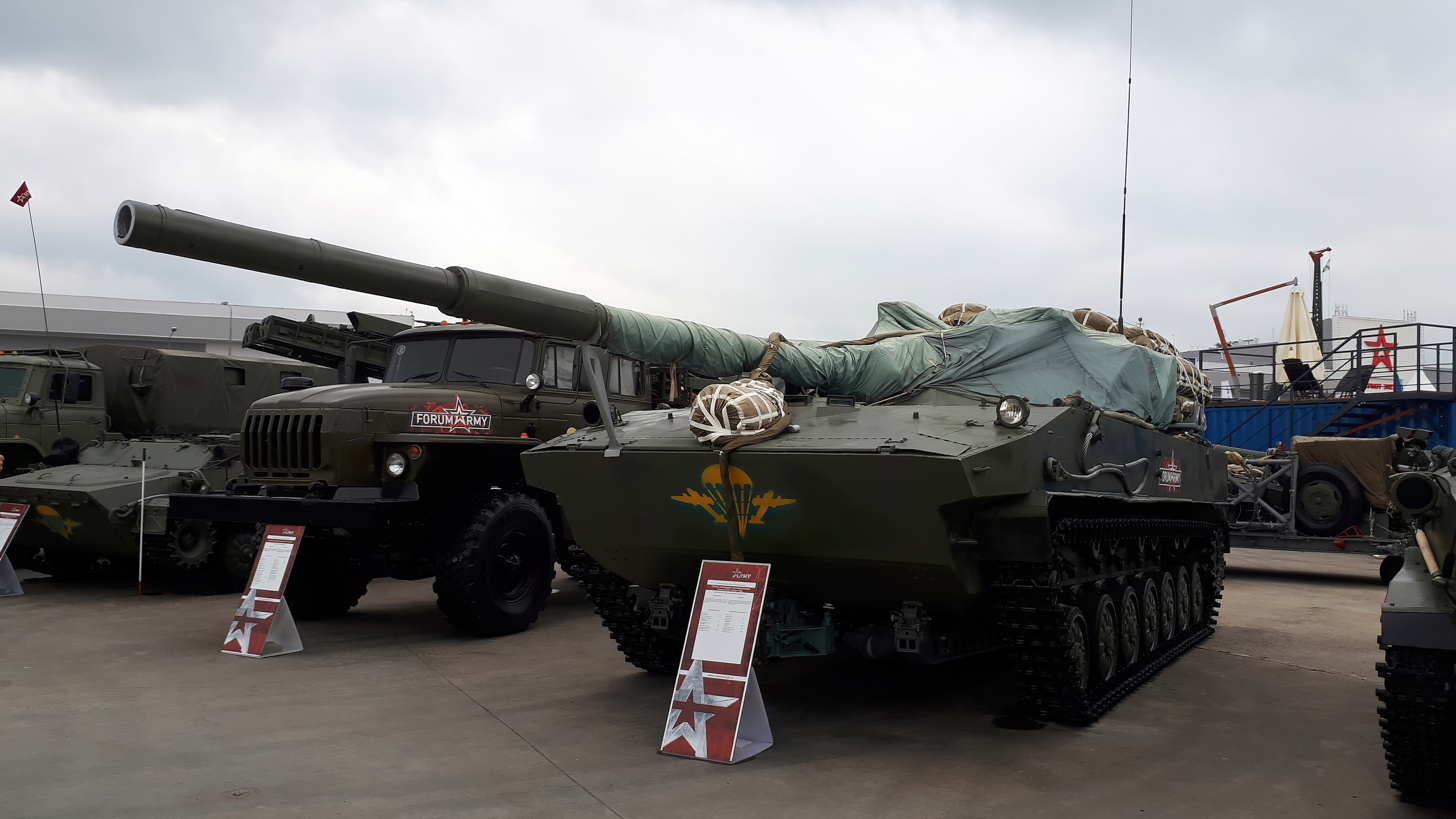
"Sprut-SD" tank/howitzer for airborne forces (equipped with parachutes)

The airborne self-propelled artillery guns ASU-57 and ASU-85 have been withdrawn. They had light armour and limited anti-tank capability, but provided invaluable fire support for paratroopers behind enemy lines (the caliber of the gun in mm is the number next to the ASU designation).

Also withdrawn were the multiple rocket launch systems RPU-14 (8U38) of 140 mm and the BM-21V "Grad-V" (9P125) of 122 mm on GAZ-66, as well as the 85 mm gun SD-44.

Today the VDV operates the following systems:

- 2S9 Nona and modernized 2S9M 120 mm self-propelled gun-mortar. Currently being replaced by the 2B23 Nona-M1 120 mm towed mortar and 2S31 Vena 120 mm self-propelled gun-mortar/2S12A modernized 120 mm self-propelled mortar
- 2S25 Sprut-SD 125 mm self-propelled artillery/anti-tank gun based on BMD-3 hull
- D-30 (2A18) 122 mm howitzer and anti-tank weapon, towed by truck, not amphibious, able to make 360 degree turns as it is deployed on a tripod
- ZU-23-2 23 mm air-defence gun, is either mounted on the BTR-D, or can be towed by a jeep or truck as it has wheels. Since 2011, some ZU-23s are being replaced by the Strela-10M3/MN and since 2016 by the newest versions of the Buk missile system.
- TOS-1A 220 mm self-propelled 24-barrel thermobaric/incendiary unguided rocket launcher since 2022.
- 2S36 Zauralets-D – future 120 mm self-propelled gun-howitzer based on the BMD-4
- 2S37 – future 152 mm self-propelled gun-howitzer based on the BMD-4

The VDV is equipped with numerous types of airborne capable trucks and jeeps, for example the Ural-4320, the GAZ-66V and the GAZ-2975 "Tigr" for transporting cargo, specialist crews and equipment (e.g. mortars, ammunitions), but not infantry (all fighting paratroopers are transported in armoured vehicles). Currently, the GAZ-66 is being replaced by the KamAZ-43501.

=== UAVs ===
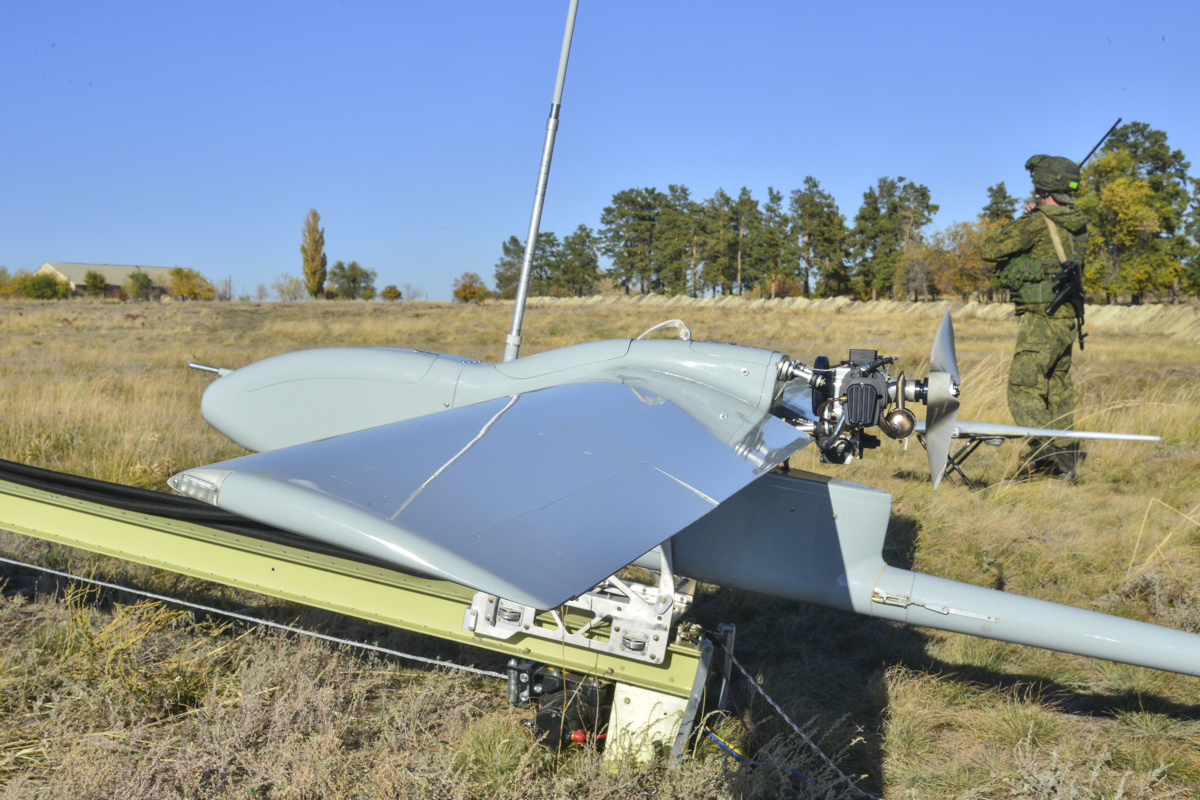
A Granat-4 UAV of the 56th Guards Air Assault Brigade

- Compact recon complex "Iskatel" (The Seeker) with 2 UAVs
- UAV complex Orlan-10
- UAV complex Granat
- UAV complex Takhion
- Kamikaze FPV drone Boomerang
- ZALA Lancet kamikaze drone
- Albatross M5 reconnaissance drone

=== UGVs ===
- Hortenzia, Shanghai and Lyagushka UGVs

== Ranks and rank insignia ==
Officer ranks

Rank group	General / flag officers				Senior officers			Junior officers
Russian Airborne Forces
Russian Airborne Forces	Генера́л а́рмии Generál ármii	Генера́л-полко́вник; Generál-polkóvnik	Генера́л-лейтена́нт; Generál-leytenánt	Генера́л-майо́р; Generál-mayór	Полко́вник; Polkóvnik	Подполко́вник; Podpolkóvnik	Майо́р; Majór	Kапита́н; Kapitán	Старший лейтена́нт Stárshiy leytenánt	Лейтенант; Leytenant	Mла́дший лейтена́нт Mládshiy leytenánt

Other ranks

Rank group	Under-officers		NCOs				Enlisted
Russian Airborne Forces
Russian Airborne Forces	Ста́рший пра́порщик Stárshiy práporshchik	Пра́порщик; Práporshchyk	Старшина́ Starshyná	Ста́рший сержа́нт Stárshiy serzhánt	Сержа́нт; Serzhánt	Мла́дший сержа́нт Mládshiy serzhánt	Ефре́йтор; Efréĭtor	Рядово́й; Ryadovóy

== Commanders of the Russian Airborne Forces ==
The flag of the Commander of the Airborne Forces

Name	Rank	Period of command
Yevgeny Podkolzin	Colonel general	7 May 1992 – 4 December 1996
Georgy Shpak	Colonel general	4 December 1996 – 8 September 2003
Alexander Kolmakov	Colonel general	8 September 2003 – 19 November 2007
Valery Yevtukhovich	Colonel general	19 November 2007 – 6 May 2009
Nikolai Ignatov	Lieutenant general	6 – 24 May 2009
Vladimir Shamanov	Colonel general	26 May 2009 – 4 October 2016
Andrey Serdyukov	Colonel general	4 October 2016 – 16 June 2022
Mikhail Teplinsky	Colonel general	16 June 2022 – present

== Traditions ==
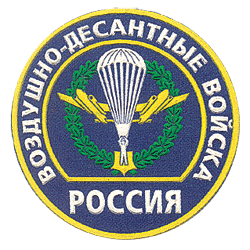
The older sleeve ensign of the Russian Airborne Forces

The former sleeve badge of the Russian Airborne Forces

=== Symbols ===
- Nickname(s): Blue Berets, Winged Infantry
- Patron: Saint Elijah the Prophet
- Motto(s): Никто, кроме нас! (Nobody, but us!)
- Beret Color: Sky Blue

As late as 1999 many members of the Airborne Forces still wore the old patch of the Soviet VDV on their uniform, either by itself or along with the Russian Armed Forces patch, which had been issued in 1994.

=== Paratroopers' Day celebrations ===
Russian airborne troops had their own holiday during the Soviet era, which continues to be celebrated on 2 August. Their most emblematic mark of distinction is a blue beret. VDV soldiers are often called "blue berets". Each year, current and former paratroopers, often in an inebriated state, celebrate by meeting up and wandering city streets and parks. The day is notorious for two common sights: paratroopers frolicking in fountains and picking fights with hapless passers-by. On Airborne Forces Day in many Russian cities, it is customary to turn off the fountains and hold veteran reunions near those fountains.

=== Bands ===
The Combined Military Band of the Airborne Forces is an integral part of all the solemn events of the Airborne Forces. Every year, the band's personnel take part in the Victory Parade on Red Square, as well as the opening ceremony of the International Army Games. In the ranks of the combined band were musicians of the military bands of the airborne and assault formations of the Airborne Forces. There were six other military bands in the airborne forces.

The Song and Dance Ensemble of the Airborne Forces is the theatrical troupe of the VDV. It began its creative activity in 1937, as the Red Army Song and Dance Ensemble of the Kiev Military District, numbering only 18 people. On 3 May 1945, three days after the signing of the German armistice, the ensemble gave a concert on the steps of the destroyed Reichstag.

During the Cold War, the unit was known as the Song and Dance Ensemble of the Group of Soviet Forces in Germany. During this time, it had participated in concerts in the cities of East Germany, Czechoslovakia, and Poland. It gained its current status in 1994. The Song and Dance Ensemble also contains the Blue Berets musical group.

== Gallery ==
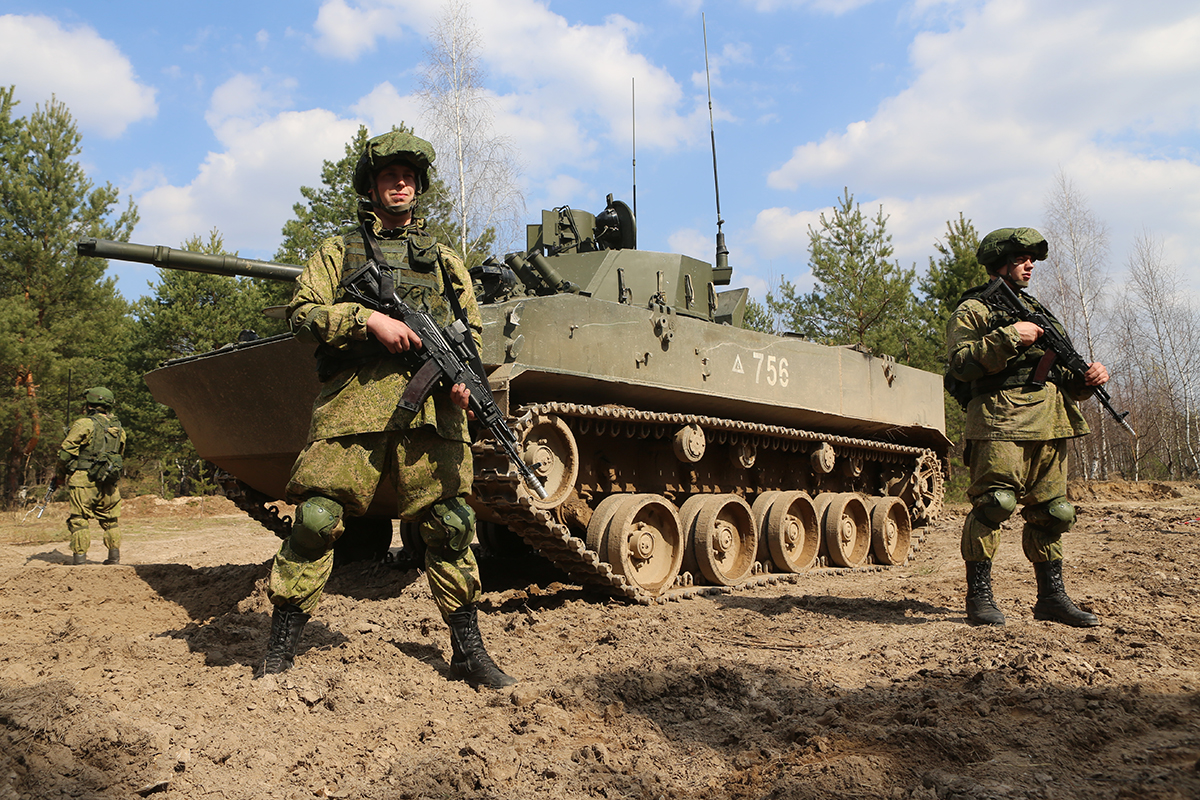
The 137th Guards Airborne Regiment troops in front of the BMD-4M vehicle.

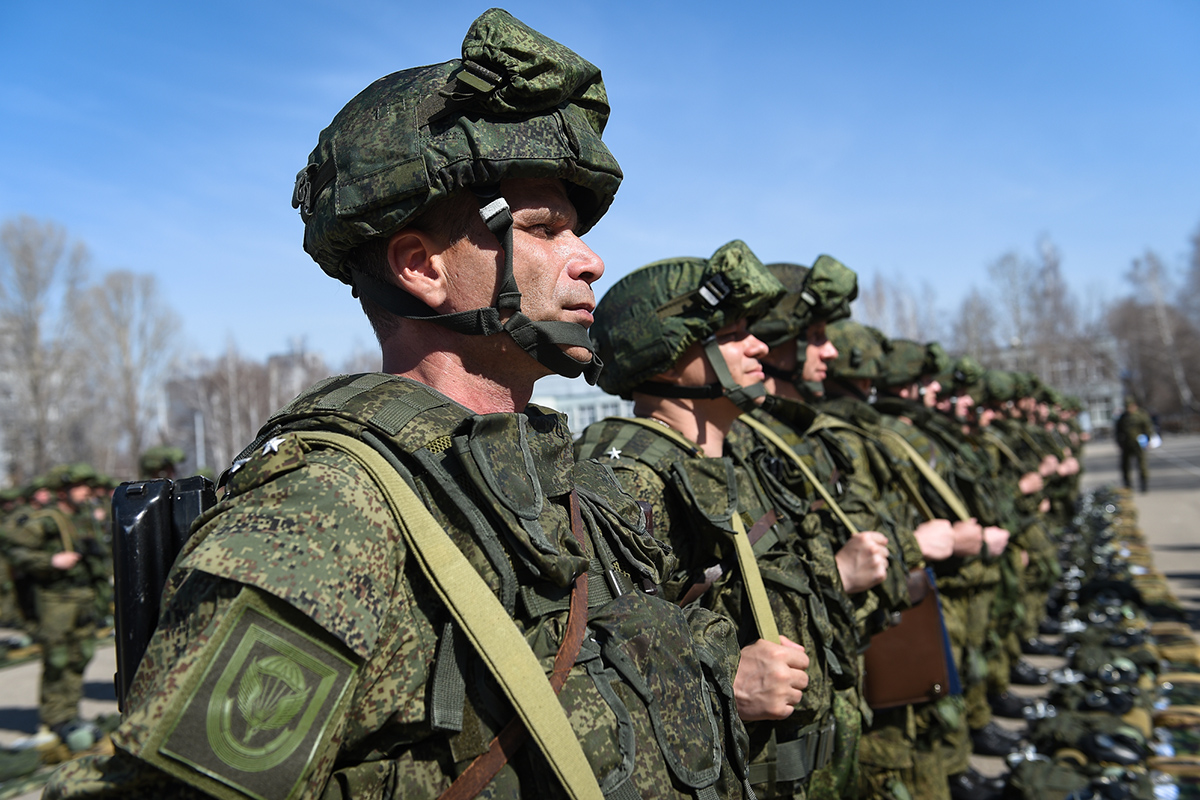
The 31st Guards Air Assault Brigade during inspection.

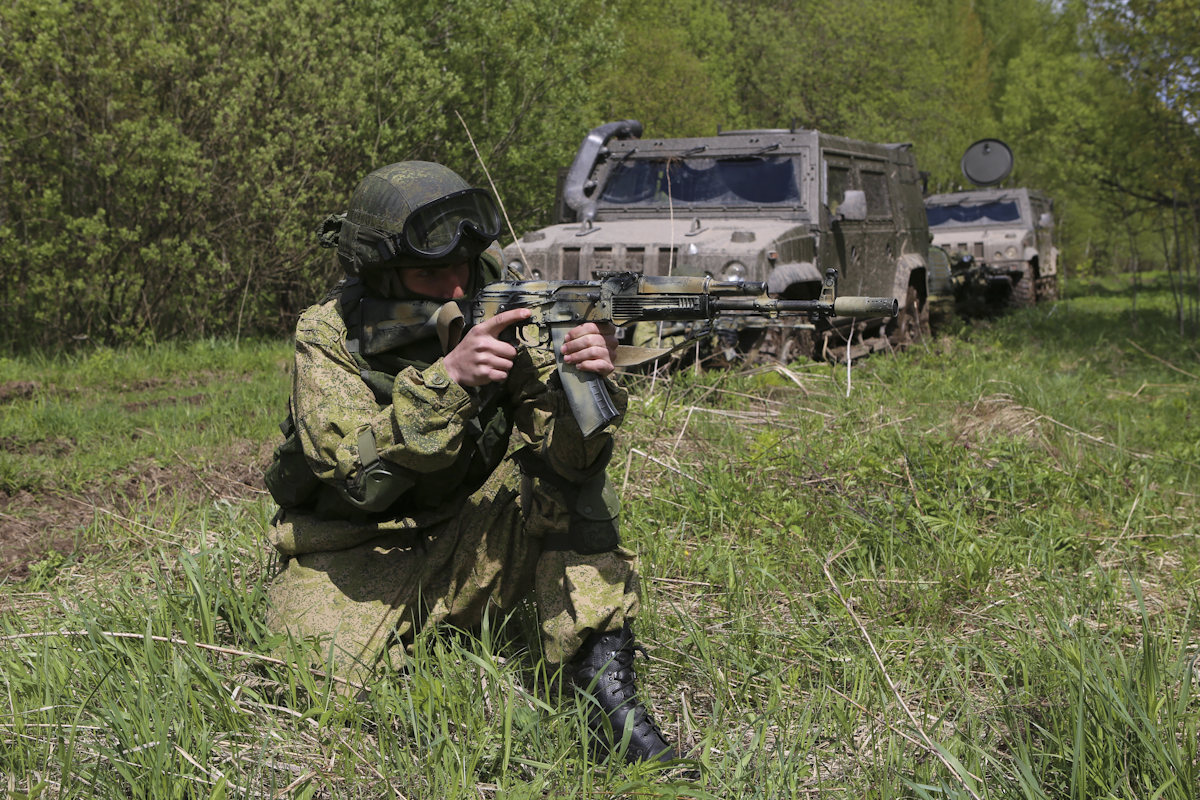
Scout of the 106th Guards Airborne Division

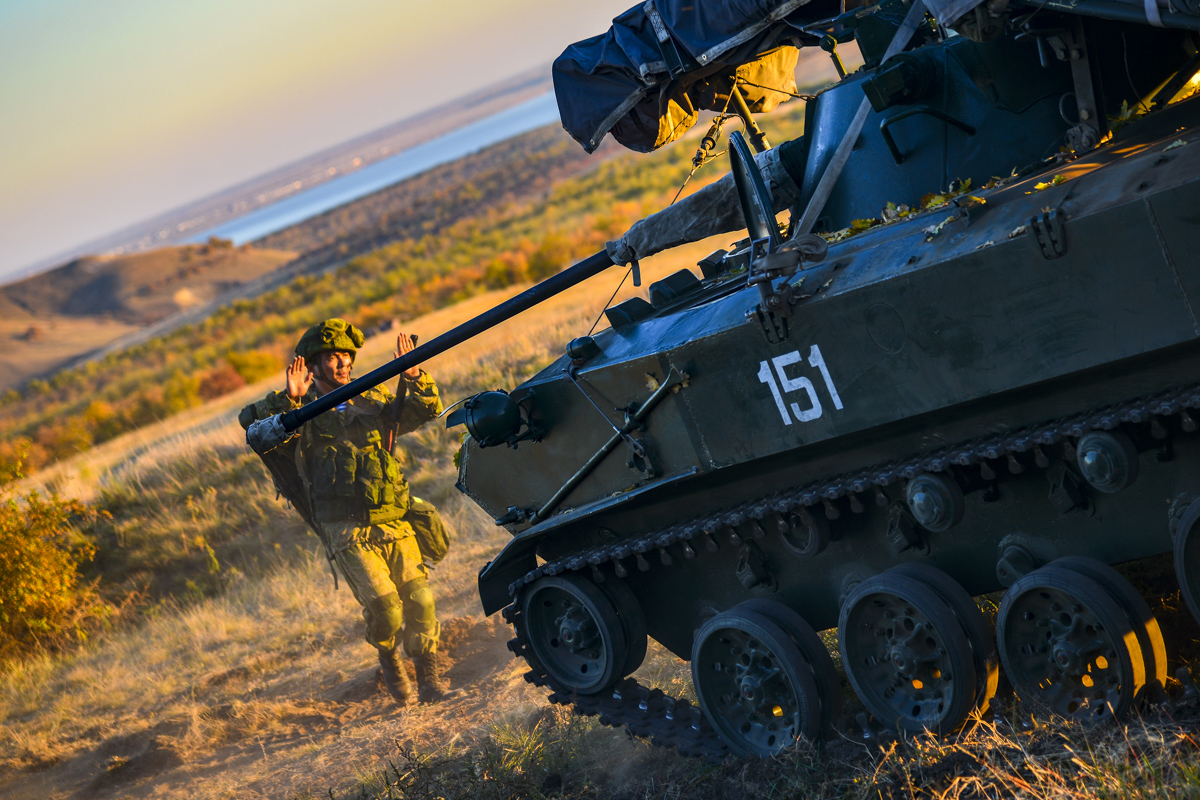
Final check of the 56th Guards Air Assault Regiment

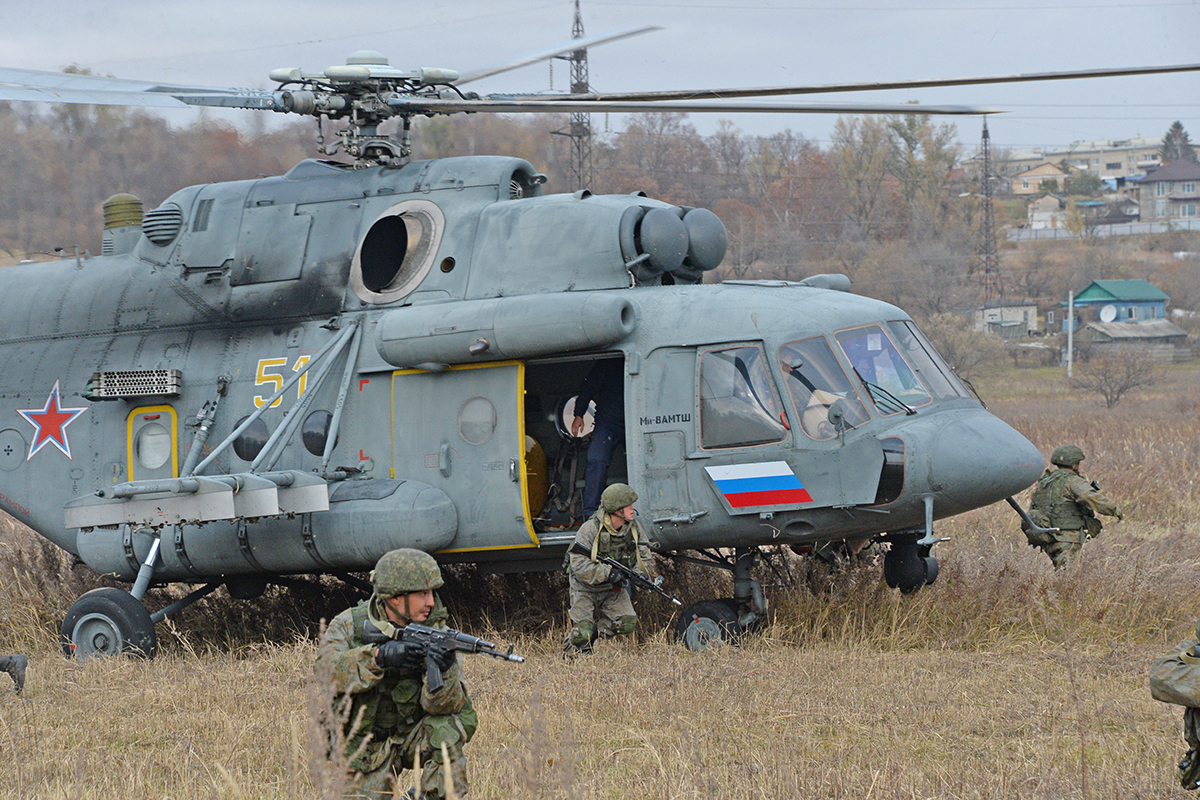
Paratroopers of the 83rd Guards Air Assault Brigade during an exercise.

== See also ==
- Special Operations Forces (Russia)
- Ukrainian Air Assault Forces
- List of Russian military bases

== Sources ==
- Elfving, Jörgen (April 2021). "An Assessment of the Russian Airborne Troops and Their Role on Tomorrow's Battlefield" (PDF). Jamestown Foundation.
- McNab, Chris (2019). The Great Bear at War: The Russian and Soviet Army, 1917-present. Osprey Publishing. ISBN 978-1-4728-3652-6.
- Thornton, Rod (2011). Organizational Change in the Russian Airborne Forces: The Lessons of the Georgian Conflict. Carlisle, PA: Strategic Studies Institute, U.S. Army War College. ISBN 978-1-58487-519-2.
- Zaloga, Steven J. (1995). Inside the Blue Berets: A Combat History of Soviet and Russian Airborne Forces, 1930–1995. Presidio Press. ISBN 978-0-89141-399-8.
