= 44th Army =

44th Army may refer to:

- Forty-Fourth Army (Japan), Imperial Japanese Army
- 44th Army (Soviet Union)

== See also ==
- List of armies by number
- 44th Division (disambiguation)
- 44th Brigade (disambiguation)
- 44th Regiment (disambiguation)
- 44th Squadron (disambiguation)
- 44th (disambiguation)
