= XXXXIV Corps =

XXXXIV Corps, XLIV Corps, or 44th Corps may refer to:

- XXXXIV Army Corps (Wehrmacht), Germany
- 44th Army Corps (Russian Empire)
- 44th Army Corps (Russian Federation)
- 44th Rifle Corps, Soviet Union
- 44th (Longton) Lancashire Rifle Volunteer Corps, United Kingdom
- 44th Yorkshire West Riding Rifle Volunteer Corps, United Kingdom

== See also ==
- List of military corps by number
- 44th Army (disambiguation)
- 44th Brigade (disambiguation)
- 44th Division (disambiguation)
- 44th Regiment (disambiguation)
- 44th Squadron (disambiguation)
- 44th (disambiguation)
