= Yury Em =

Russian politician (born 1953)

- Юрий Эм
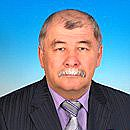

Member of the State Duma
- In office 2014 – 6 April 2016

Deputy Chairman of the Government of Stavropol Krai - Head of the Office of the Government of Stavropol Krai
- In office May 2012 – 2014

Member of the State Duma
- In office December 2011 – May 2012

Deputy Chairman of the Government of the Chechen Republic
- In office 2000–2002

Personal details
- Born: Yury Pavlovich Em; 12 September 1953 Kurgan, Molotov Oblast, Russian SFSR, Soviet Union
- Party: Independent
- Education: Alma-Ata Higher Combined Arms Command School; Frunze Military Academy
- Awards: Hero of the Russian Federation; Order of Military Merit; Order of the Red Star; Order "For Service to the Homeland in the Armed Forces of the USSR" Third Class; Order "For Personal Courage"; Medal of Zhukov (twice); Medal "For Distinction in Military Service"; Medal "For Impeccable Service" First, Second and Third Classes

Military service
- Branch/service: Soviet Airborne Forces; Russian Airborne Forces
- Years of service: 1975—2011
- Rank: Major General
- Commands: 247th Guards Air Assault Regiment; 21st Independent Air Assault Brigade
- Battles/wars: Soviet–Afghan War; Nagorno-Karabakh conflict South Ossetia war War in Abkhazia; First Chechen War; War in Dagestan; Second Chechen War

Yury Pavlovich Em (Russian: Юрий Павлович Эм; born 12 September 1953) is a Russian politician and retired army officer. He held the rank of major general and sat as a member of the State Duma between 2011 and 2012, and between 2014 and 2016 during its sixth convocation.

Em had served as Deputy Chairman of the Government of Stavropol Krai and as Head of the Office of the Government of Stavropol Krai between 2012 and 2013, during his absence from the Duma. He also had been the Deputy Chairman of the Government of the Chechen Republic from 2000 to 2002.

An army veteran, Em served in various wars, such as the Soviet-Afghan war, the Nagorno-Karabakh conflict, the South Osseita war, the War in Abkhazia, the War in Dagestan, and the Chechen Wars. He was awarded the title of Hero of the Russian Federation in 2000.

== Biography ==
=== Family and early service ===
Yury Em was born on 12 September 1953 in Kurgan, now in Cherdynsky District, Perm Krai, to a family of exiled settlers. He is of Korean descent. His father, Dyun Wo Em, was a military pilot, and a recipient of the Order of the Red Banner, and his mother was of Volga German descent. He graduated from high school in 1971.

Em joined the Soviet Army in 1971. In 1975, he graduated from the Alma-Ata Higher Combined Arms Command School, excelling as an athlete and being drafted into the Soviet Airborne Forces. He served in Osh. From to 1980 to 1982 he served in the Soviet–Afghan War as part of the Soviet forces deployed there, where he was chief of staff of a parachute battalion. He received awards for heroism in combat, although he was expected to be nominated for the title of Hero of the Soviet Union.

=== Commands ===
At the end of his service in Afghanistan, Em served in the Leningrad Military District in 1985, then he was sent to study at the Frunze Military Academy, from which he graduated in 1988. He was appointed deputy commander of the 21st Independent Air Assault Brigade, and after several years he became its commander. He participated in the Nagorno-Karabakh conflict, South Ossetia war, the War in Abkhazia, and the First Chechen War from 1994 to 1996.

In 1998, the brigade was reduced, becoming the 247th Guards Air Assault Regiment of the 7th Guards Airborne Division. Em commanded the regiment during the War in Dagestan in 1999, seeing action at the Battle for Donkey's Ear Height, and entering villages in Tandinsky district. Between October 1999 and January 2000, Em and the regiment fought in the Second Chechen War. He oversaw the capture of a number of settlements and strategically important sites, and the deployment of troops. He was concussed during an ambush but did not leave the battlefield, continuing to lead his troops until the end of the battle. On 6 May 2000, by the Decree of the President of Russia, for courage and heroism manifested during the counter-terrorist operation in the North Caucasus, Colonel Em was awarded the title of Hero of the Russian Federation with the award of the gold star medal.

Colonel Em remained serving in the Russian Army. By the end of 2000, he became deputy chairman of the Government of the Chechen Republic. In 2002, he became the chief federal inspector of the Southern Federal District. In 2004, he was deputy military commissar of Kaluga Oblast, and in 2005 he has become the military commissar of Ulyanovsk Oblast. In January 2007, Em was promoted to major general. On 21 February 2008, he was appointed military commissar of Stavropol Krai, replacing Vitaly Tartarenko, who resigned.

=== Political life ===
In December 2011, Em became a member of the State Duma. In May 2012, he left the Duma to become the Deputy Chairman of the Government of Stavropol Krai - Head of the Office of the Government of the Stavropol Territory. The mandate was passed on to Olga Kazakova. In October 2013, he was dismissed as deputy chairman of the regional government, and in 2014 again received the mandate of a State Duma deputy, following Andrey Murga's departure from the Duma.

On 31 March 2016, the Constitutional Court of Russia declared the transfer of the mandate to Em unconstitutional, given that he had previously abandoned the mandate to take up a public service role. On 6 April 2016, Em voluntarily abandoned the mandate. The mandate was then passed on to former skater Elena Berezhnaya.

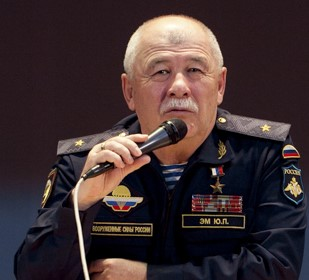
Em in December 2017

== Family ==
Em's son, Aleksandr, served in the Russian Armed Forces from 1994 to 2001. Like his father he saw action in the Second Chechen War, and was awarded the Order of Courage and the Medal "For Courage". Since 2016, he has been the Deputy Mayor of the city of Nevinnomyssk in Stavropol Krai.

== Awards ==
On July 17, 2009, in honor of Hero of Russia Yuri Em, the vessel OM-401 of the Ulyanovsk River Port was renamed Hero Yuri Em.

In 2015, the vessel Hero Yuri Em served as a filming location for the feature film From the Bottom to the Summit.
