= 44th Airborne Division =

44th Airborne Division may refer to:

- 44th Airborne Division (People's Republic of China)
- 44th Airborne Division (India)
- 44th Air Assault Division, Russia
- 44th Training Airborne Division, Soviet Union

== See also ==
- 44th Division (disambiguation)
