= 44th =

44th is the ordinal form of the number 44. 44th or Forty-fourth may also refer to:

- A fraction, 1/44, equal to one of 44 equal parts

== Geography ==
- 44th meridian east, a line of longitude
- 44th meridian west, a line of longitude
- 44th parallel north, a circle of latitude
- 44th parallel south, a circle of latitude

== Military ==
- 44th Army
- 44th Brigade (disambiguation)
- 44th Division (disambiguation)
- 44th Regiment (disambiguation)
- 44th Squadron (disambiguation)

== Other ==
- 44th Amendment
- 44th century
- 44th century BC

== See also ==
- 44 (disambiguation)
