= Mikhail Zusko =

Russian general

- Born: Mikhail Stephanovich Zsko; 24 May 1972 (age 54); Volyn, Ukraine
- Military career
- Allegiance: Soviet Union; Russia
- Branch: Soviet Army; Russian Ground Forces
- Service years: 1990–present
- Unit: 58th Combined Arms Army
- Conflicts: Russo-Ukrainian War; Russian invasion of Ukraine

Mikhail Stephanovich Zusko is a Russian general.

== Pre Ukraine career ==
Mikhail Zusko has been involved in numerous positions before the Russian Invasion of Ukraine. Although he is known as an Army General Officer, he was very known to have immense experience due to his service in the first Chechan War.

Zusko's career prior to 2007 is unknown, though he reportedly gained combat experience in the First Chechen War. He would go on to serve as deputy commander of the 11th Separate Air Assault Brigade from 2007 to 2011. Eventually he went to become the Commander of the 34th Motorized Rifle Brigade of the 49th CAA from 2011 to 2014.

== Post Ukraine career ==
Ukraine's GUR reported that Zusko commanded the 1st Army Corps for several months in 2014. Zusko then served as Deputy Commander of the 49th CAA from 2015 to July 2019, when he took command of the army—a rare direct elevation from deputy commander to commander of the same CAA. Zusko took command of the 58th CAA in August 2020.

In December 2022, Mikhail Zusko was added to the UK's sanctions list along with 15 other generals. His sanctions are due to "money laundering." That same day, the Cayman Islands put sanctions on him. In February 2023, Zusko was added to the EU sanctions list.

In March 2022, Zusko was arrested due to "failing during the special operation". However, according to media outlets Zusko continued to serve as a Russian Commander for the Russian Forces in Ukraine for the Western Grouping of forces.

Military offices
Preceded by Sergey Ryzhkov	Commander of the 58th Combined Arms Army; 2016–2017	Succeeded by Ivan Popov
