= Viktor Astapov =

Russian military officer

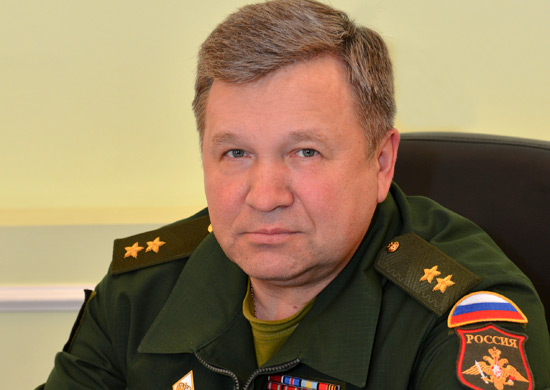
- Native name: Виктор Борисович Астапов
- Born: 9 December 1962 (age 63); Tikhoretsk, Krasnodar Krai, Russian SFSR, USSR
- Allegiance: Soviet Union (to 1991); Russia
- Branch: Russian Airborne Forces; Russian Navy
- Service years: 1981–present
- Rank: Lieutenant General
- Commands: 7th Guards Mountain Air Assault Division; 49th Combined Arms Army
- Awards: Order of Courage; Order "For Service to the Homeland in the Armed Forces of the USSR" Third Class; Order of Military Merit

Viktor Borisovich Astapov (Russian: Виктор Борисович Астапов; born 9 December 1962) is an officer of the Russian Armed Forces. He currently holds the rank of Lieutenant General, and since 2019 has served as a deputy commander in chief of the Russian Navy.

Astapov entered the military after studying at the Ryazan Guards Higher Airborne Command School, serving in a regimental reconnaissance company of the Soviet Airborne Forces. Rising through the ranks, he saw service during the First Nagorno-Karabakh War, subsequently becoming commander of a paratrooper battalion after the breakup of the Soviet Union. He saw action in the First and Second Chechen Wars as deputy commander of the 21st Airborne Brigade, and later as commander of the 51st Guards Airborne Regiment. By the mid-2000s, he was the commander of the 7th Guards Mountain Air Assault Division, and after studies at the Military Academy of the General Staff, became chief of staff and first deputy commander of the Siberian Military District.

Astapov went on to serve in senior staff positions in the Southern and Western Military Districts, rising to the rank of lieutenant-general, before becoming a deputy commander of the navy, with responsibility for the coastal troops. Over his career, he has received a number of awards, including the Order of Courage, the Order "For Service to the Homeland in the Armed Forces of the USSR" Third Class, and the Order of Military Merit.

== Early life and service ==
Astapov was born on 9 December 1962 in Tikhoretsk, Krasnodar Krai, then part of the Russian SFSR, in the USSR. Inspired by the 1971 film Officers, Astapov decided on a career in the military and settled on the Soviet Airborne Forces. After failing to gain entry to the Ryazan Guards Higher Airborne Command School on his first attempt, Astapov spent a year studying physics at Rostov State University, before succeeding in applying to the Ryazan Airborne School. He graduated in 1985 and went to serve in a regimental reconnaissance company of the Soviet Airborne Forces based in Tula. The following year he was appointed commander of the company and went with them to Baku, where he was posted during the First Nagorno-Karabakh War. He subsequently received the Order "For Service to the Homeland in the Armed Forces of the USSR" Third Class for his service in policing the rising tensions. On his return to Russia, he was appointed chief of staff of a paratrooper battalion of the 106th Guards Airborne Division, becoming its commander two and a half years later.

== Commands and Chechen operations ==
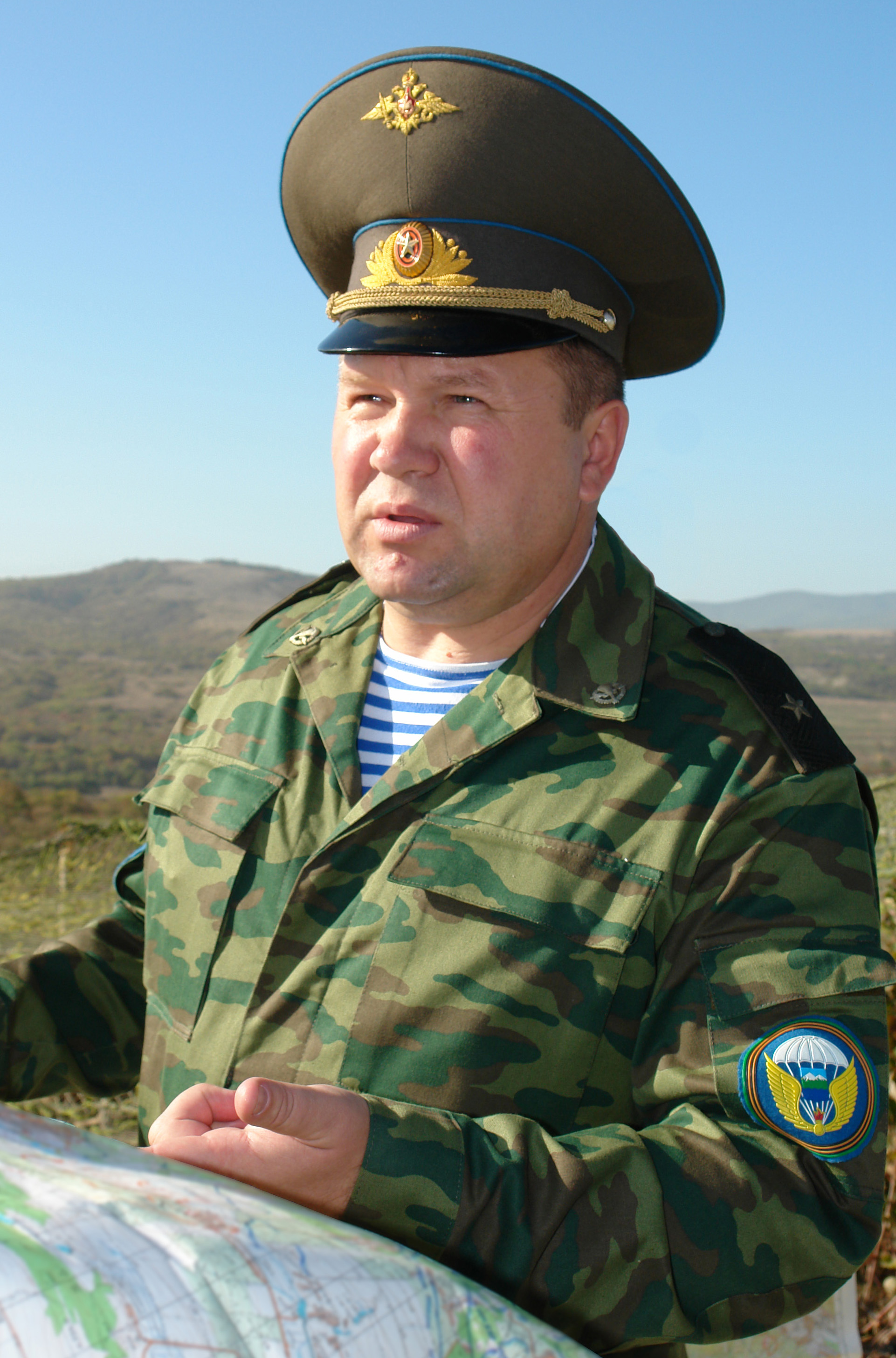
Astapov in 2006, while commander of the 7th Guards Mountain Air Assault Division

Astapov then carried out studies at the Frunze Military Academy, graduating in 1996 and becoming deputy commander of the 21st Airborne Brigade, which was seconded to Chechnya during the First and Second Chechen Wars. In 1999 he was given command of the 51st Guards Airborne Regiment, and took charge of the regiment's withdrawal from Chechnya. Despite continuing attacks on withdrawing Russian forces, Astapov brought off the withdrawal with minimal losses and was awarded the Order of Courage and the Medal "For Distinction in Military Service", first and second classes. He then became the commander of the 7th Guards Mountain Air Assault Division between 2005 and 2007. He graduated from the Military Academy of the General Staff of the Armed Forces in 2009 and was then appointed to the post of chief of staff and first deputy commander of an army of the Siberian Military District.

== Senior staff appointments ==
From January 2011 Astapov served as chief of staff and deputy commander of the 49th Combined Arms Army of the Southern Military District, and in May 2012 became commander of the 49th Combined Arms Army. As army commander, he was also head of the Stavropol Territorial Garrison. From December 2013 to April 2014, he was deputy commander of the Southern Military District, being promoted from general-major to general-lieutenant on 24 February 2014. On 21 June 2014, he was appointed chief of staff and first deputy commander of the Western Military District. As chief of staff of the Western Military District, Astapov was heavily involved in planning and carrying out the Zapad 2017 exercises. On 1 August 2018, while serving as acting commander of the Western Military District, Astapov met with a Japanese military delegation in Saint Petersburg, led by Defence Minister Itsunori Onodera.

In February 2019 Astapov was moved from the position of chief of staff of the Western Military District to the post of a deputy commander of the navy, with responsibility for the coastal troops. It was noted at the time that Astapov had experience from participating in the Russian military intervention in the Syrian Civil War. His replacement as chief of staff of the Western Military District was Lieutenant-General Aleksei Zavizon.

== Awards and personal life ==
Over his career, Astapov has been awarded the Order of Courage, the Order "For Service to the Homeland in the Armed Forces of the USSR" Third Class, and the Order of Military Merit, as well as a number of medals. He is married, with a son.

Military offices
Preceded by Oleg Makarevich	Deputy Commander-in-Chief of the Russian Navy for Ground and Coastal Forces; Commander of the Coastal Forces of the Navy; 2019–present	Incumbent
Preceded by Andrey Kartapolov	Commander of the Western Military District; Acting; 2018	Succeeded by Aleksandr Zhuravlyov
Preceded by Andrey Kartapolov	Commander of the Western Military District; Acting; 2016–2017	Succeeded by Andrey Kartapolov
Preceded by Andrey Kartapolov	Chief of Staff and First Deputy Commander of the Western Military District; 2014–2018	Succeeded by Aleksey Zavizon
Preceded by Andrey Serdyukov	Deputy Commander of the Southern Military District; 2013–2014	Succeeded by Andrey Gurulyov
Preceded by Sergey Kuralenko	Commander of the 49th Combined Arms Army; 2012–2013	Succeeded by Sergey Sevryukov
Preceded by Nikolai Ignatov	Commander of the 7th Guards Mountain Air Assault Division; 2005–2007	Succeeded by Vladimir Kochetkov
