= X44 =

X44 or X-44 may refer to:

- Agent X44, 2007 Star Cinema film starring Vhong Navarro as Agent X44 with Mariel Rodriguez in her film debut
- Lockheed Martin X-44 MANTA (Multi-Axis No-Tail Aircraft), a conceptual aircraft design by Lockheed Martin that has been studied by NASA and the U.S. Air Force
- Lockheed Martin X-44 (UAV), an unmanned aerial vehicle by Lockheed Martin, unrelated to the X-44 MANTA
- Team X44, an Extreme E electric offroad rally racing team founded by Lewis Hamilton

== See also ==
- X4 (disambiguation)
- 44 (disambiguation)
- X (disambiguation)
