= 34th Separate Guards Mountain Motor Rifle Brigade =

Russian Ground Forces formation

34th Guards Mountain Motor Rifle Brigade
- 34-я гвардейская мотострелковая бригада (горная)
- Brigade insignia
- Active: 2006–present
- Country: Russia
- Branch: Russian Ground Forces
- Type: Mechanized infantry
- Role: Mountain warfare
- Size: Brigade
- Part of: 49th Combined Arms Army
- Garrison/HQ: Storozhevaya
- Engagements: Russo-Georgian War; Russo-Ukrainian War
- Decorations: Guards

Commanders
- Current commander: Colonel Smirnov Andrei Valerievich

The 34th Guards Mountain Motor Rifle Brigade (Russian: 34-я отдельная гвардейская мотострелковая бригада (горная), 34 омсбр(г); Military Unit Number 01485) is a mountain warfare formation of the Russian Ground Forces. It is part of the 49th Combined Arms Army, Southern Military District. It is stationed in the village of Storozhevaya-2, Zelenchuksky District, Karachay-Cherkessia. It was created on 30 June 2006. It belongs to the Mountain Troops, whose task is to fight in mountainous areas. In 2014, it was reported that the brigade trained military mountaineers and had pack units on horses of local breeds.

The brigade took part in the Russian invasion of Ukraine. It was present in Ukraine by April 2022. As part of Armed Forces of Ukraine offensive operations in the Kherson area in late July 2022, its headquarters was claimed to be destroyed by forces of the Ukrainian Operational Command South.

On 5 December 2024 the brigade was awarded the "Guards" status.

== Organization ==
The brigade includes the following units:

- Brigade Headquarters
- 1001st Separate Motor Rifle Battalion (Mountain)
- 1021st Separate Motor Rifle Battalion (Mountain)
- 1199th Separate Motor Rifle Battalion (Mountain)
- 491st Separate Howitzer Self-Propelled Artillery Battalion
- Signals Battalion
- Anti-Aircraft Missile and Artillery Battalion
- Electronic-Warfare Company
- Engineering-Sapper Company
- Repair Company
- Logistics Company
- Medical Company
