= Ivan Popov =

Ivan Popov is the name of:

- Ivan Popov (cyclist) (1951–2014), Bulgarian Olympic cyclist
- Ivan Popov (wrestler), Australian wrestler
- Ivan Popov (general) who died during St. Nedelya Church assault
- Ivan Popov (major general) (born 1975), Russian army commander
- Ivan Popov (diplomat), see Tripartite Pact
- Ivan Popov (governor), see List of governors of Chernigov Governorate
- Ivan Popov (chess player), Russian chess grandmaster
- Ivan Popov (revolutionary), Bulgarian revolutionary
- Ivan Evseyevich Popov (1797–1879) a Russian Orthodox missionary priest
- Ivan Nikolaevich Popov (1878-after 1912), Russian deputy in 3rd Imperial Duma
- Ivan Popov (spy) (1910–1980), Serbian spy who work for MI6 during World War II
- Ivan Popov (photographer), Yakut artist and photographer
