= Kurgan, Perm Krai =

Kurgan Курган
- Settlement
- Location within Perm Krai Location within Russia
- Coordinates: 60°09′N 56°08′E
- Country: Russia
- Region: Perm Krai
- District: Cherdynsky District
- Time zone: UTC+5:00

Kurgan (Russian: Курган) is a rural locality (a settlement) and the administrative center of Ust-Urolskoye Rural Settlement, Cherdynsky District, Perm Krai, Russia. The population was 505 as of 2010. There are 9 streets.

== Geography ==
Kurgan is located 127 km southwest of Cherdyn (the district's administrative centre) by road. Shishigino is the nearest rural locality.
