= 227th Artillery Brigade (Russia) =

227th Tallinn Order of Suvorov Red Banner Artillery Brigade
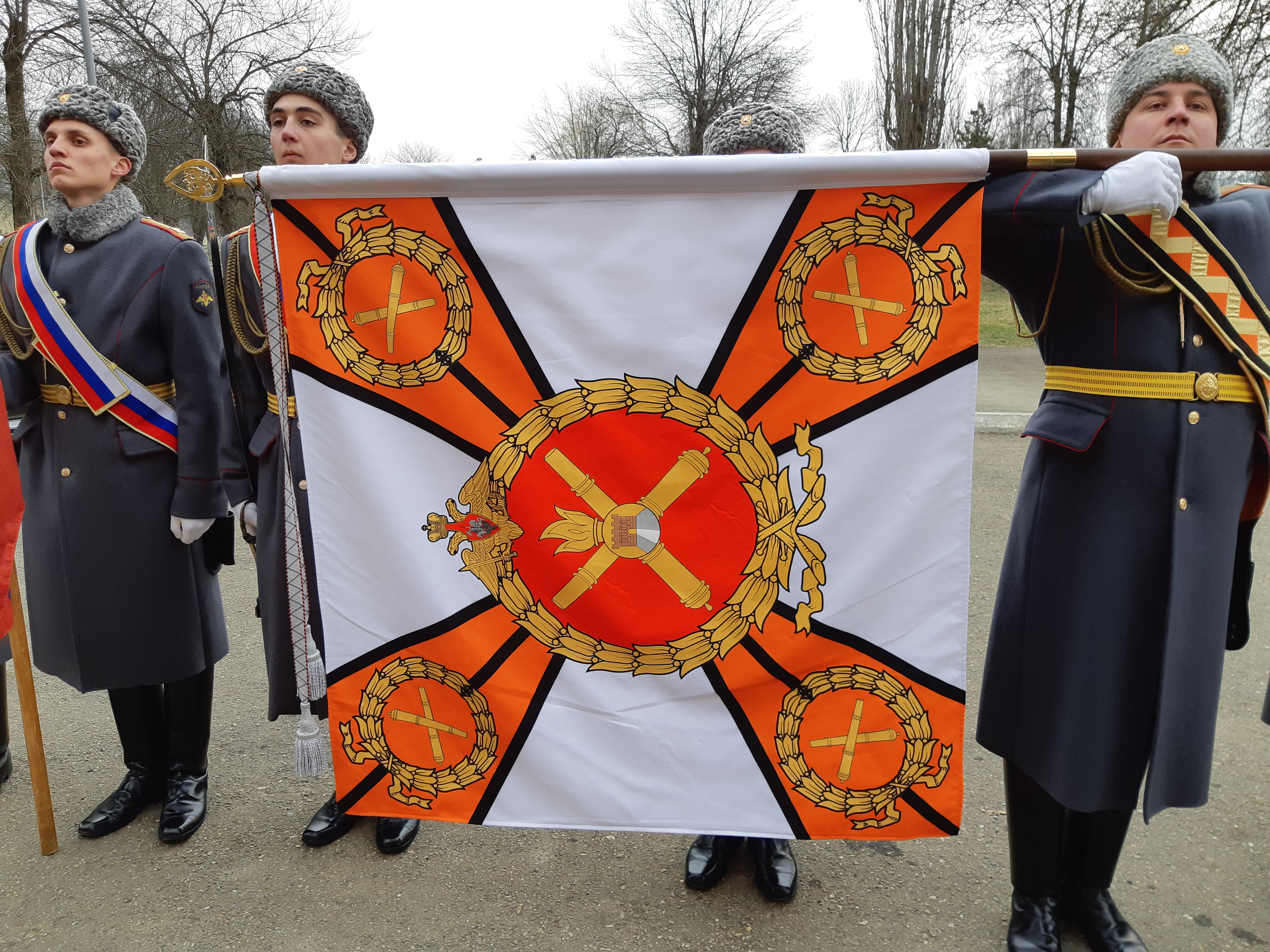
- Active: 2017–present
- Country: Russia
- Branch: Russian Ground Forces
- Type: Artillery
- Size: Brigade
- Part of: 49th Combined Arms Army
- Garrison/HQ: Krasnooktyabrsky, Adygea
- Engagements: Russian invasion of Ukraine
- Decorations: Order of Suvorov; Order of Red Banner
- Battle honours: Tallinn

Commanders
- Current commander: Colonel Aleksei Repin

The 227th Tallinn Order of Suvorov Red Banner Artillery Brigade is a formation of the Russian Ground Forces. It is part of the 49th Combined Arms Army. Its military unit number is 21797.

The brigade was formed in 2017 on the basis of the 943th Rocket Artillery Regiment. The brigade is equipped with the Msta-B howitzer and the BM-27 Uragan. The unit has participated in the Russian invasion of Ukraine and has suffered the loss of many senior staff including the brigade commander, Lieutenant Colonel Vyacheslav Savinov in March 2022.
