= Ivan Zakharkin =

Soviet general (1889–1944)

Иван Григорьевич Захаркин Ivan Grigorevich Zakharkin
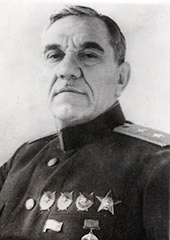
- Born: January 27, 1889; Shatsky District, Tambov Governorate, Russian Empire
- Died: October 15, 1944 (aged 55); Odessa, Soviet Union
- Military career
- Allegiance: Russian Empire (1910–1918); Soviet Union (1918–1944)
- Service years: 1910–1944
- Rank: Colonel general
- Commands: 10th Army; 43rd Army; 49th Army; Odessa Military District
- Conflicts: World War II; Battle of Moscow; Battle of Kursk
- Awards: Order of the Red Banner (4); Order of Suvorov, 2nd class; Order of the Red Star

Ivan Grigorevich Zakharkin (Russian: Ива́н Григо́рьевич Заха́ркин) (January 27, 1889 – October 15, 1944) was a Soviet colonel general in the Red Army during World War II, commander of the 49th Army during the Battle of Moscow.

== Early life ==
Zakharkin was the son of a poor peasant and was a worker until joining the army in 1910.

== World War I ==
During World War I, Zakharkin was a noncommissioned officer. He managed to graduate from an ensign training school, and advanced to second lieutenant. He was deployed on the South-Western Front as a junior officer.

== The Russian Revolution and Civil War ==
He volunteered in the Red Army in May 1918 and fought on the southern front against the White Army. There, he debuted as a commander with a battalion and at some point an entire regiment. But later that year, he was wounded and stayed away from the front.

== Inter-war period ==
He graduated from the Military Academy of the Workers’ and Peasants’ Red Army in 1921 and from the Military Political Academy in 1930. From 1937 to 1941, he was chief of staff of the Moscow Military District and later became deputy commander.

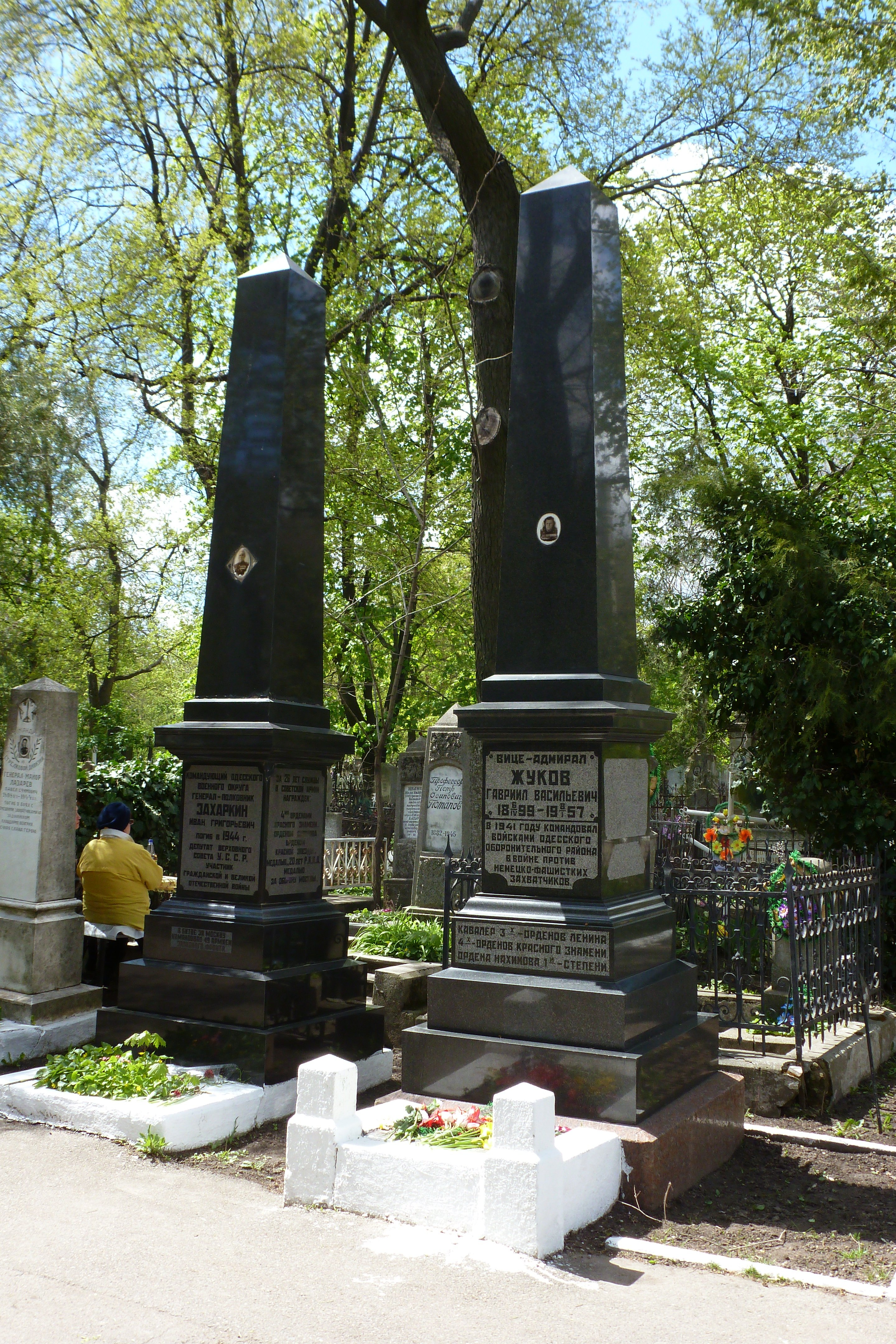
The tombstones of General-Colonel Ivan Zakharkin and Vice-Admiral Gavriil Zhukov. 2nd Christian Cemetery in Odessa, Ukraine

== World War II ==
In 1939, he commanded the 10th Army during the Polish campaign. As of 1941, he was deputy commander of the Central and Byelorussian fronts and he commanded the 49th Army of the Soviet Union, playing a key role early on during the Battle of Moscow in late 1941. There, he was placed by Zhukov in Kaluga as part of the Mozhaisk Defence Line, which contributed greatly in slowing down the German advance toward Moscow. They were able to stop the XIII Army Corps near Serphukov and by mid-December, they were able to launch a counteroffensive. During the Soviet counterattack in early 1942, he led his troops in Tula, Kaluga, and Rzhev. During the Rzhev-Vyazma operation, the 49th Army liberated the city of Yukhnov and by 20 April had reached the Ugra river. In March 1943, the army under the command of Zakharkin participated in the Rzhev-Vyazma offensive (1943), advancing in the direction of the Spas-Demensk. On 18 September 1943 Zakharkin was promoted to colonel general. On 23 March he was appointed commander of the Odessa Military District. He died in a car crash on 15 October 1944 and was buried in Odessa.
