= 49th Combined Arms Army =

Russian Ground Forces formation

49th Army
- 49-я армия
- Great emblem of the 49th Combined Arms Army
- Active: 6 August 1941 – 1945; 1992–1994; 2010–present
- Country: Soviet Union/Russian Federation
- Branch: Soviet Army/Russian Ground Forces
- Size: Field army
- Part of: Southern Military District
- Garrison/HQ: Stavropol (current)

Commanders
- Current commander: Lieutenant general Mikhail Kosobokov
- Notable commanders: Ivan Zakharkin; Ivan Grishin

The 49th Combined Arms Army (Russian: 49-я общевойсковая армия) is a combined arms (field) army (CAA) of the Russian Ground Forces, formed in 2010 and headquartered in Stavropol. Military Unit в/ч 35181.

Part of the Southern Military District, the army traces its heritage back to the Soviet Red Army's 49th Army, formed in 1941 after the German invasion of the Soviet Union in World War II. The 49th Army served through the entire war and was disbanded postwar in the summer of 1945.

== History ==
=== Red Army ===
On 6 August 1941, a Stavka directive ordered the formation of the 49th Army. One day later the army was formed as part of the Reserve Front, based on the 35th Rifle Corps, commanded by Lieutenant General Ivan Zakharkin. The army initially comprised 194th Mountain Rifle Division, 220th, 248th, 298th Rifle Divisions, the 4th People's Militia Division, 396th Corps Artillery Regiment, and other units. By 17 August 1941 the army was deployed in the rear of the Western Front, concentrated in the Dorogobuzh area with the task of manning the reserve defensive line of the front. On 1 October, the army was transferred to the direct subordination of Stavka and renamed the "49th Reserve Army," but was moved back to the Reserve Front on 7 October.

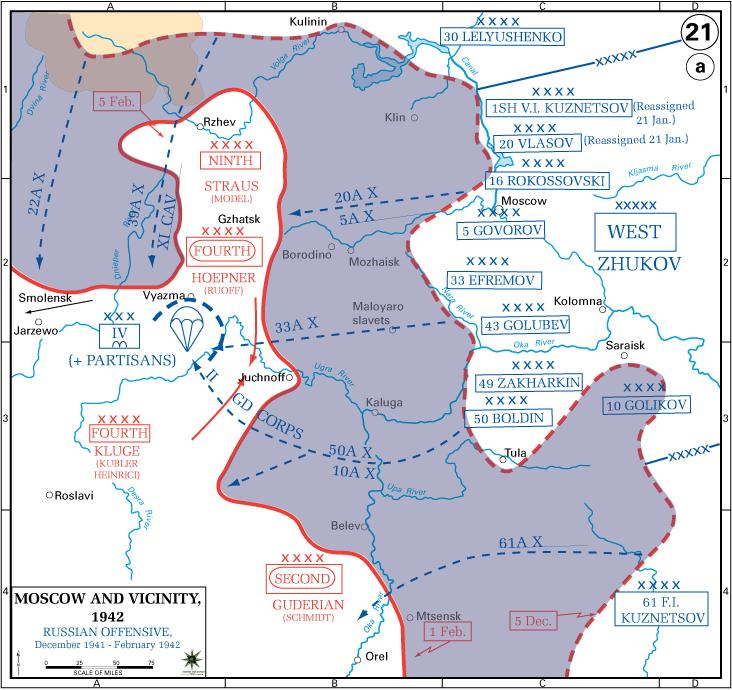
The Rzhev salient, between 1941 and 1942

On 12 October 1941, the 49th Army was placed on the Mozhaisk defense line in the Kaluga area, after giving up its sector to the 32nd Army. The Mozhaisk line was credited for slowing down the German approach toward Moscow. A day later, the army was transferred to the Western Front and saw its first combat in the Mozhaisk-Maloyaroslavets Defensive Operation, which lasted until 30 October. In fierce fighting from 14 to 20 November, the 49th Army was able to weaken the advancing German XIII Army Corps, finally stopping it in early December on the line west of Serpukhov and Sukhodol, 20 kilometers southeast of Aleksin. During the Soviet counteroffensive at Moscow, the army fought in the Tula Offensive between 6 and 16 December, and the Kaluga Offensive between 17 December and 5 January 1942.

On 8 January, the 49th Army began fighting in the Rzhev-Vyazma Strategic Offensive, which aimed to eliminate the heavily fortified Rzhev salient, which threatened Moscow. On 5 March, troops of the army recaptured Yukhnov, and by 20 April reached the Ugra and the Ressa Rivers, both west of Yukhnov. The 49th Army held the same positions until March 1943. Between 2 and 31 March 1943, the army fought in the Rzhev–Vyazma Offensive, which attempted to stop Operation Büffel, the German phased withdrawal from the Rzhev salient. In June, Lieutenant General Ivan Grishin, who would command the army until the end of the war, took command.

From 7 August to 2 October, the 49th Army participated in the Smolensk Operation, advancing towards Spas-Demensk, Stodolishche, and Khislavichi in its first phase, the Spas-Demensk Offensive. Operating in conjunction with the 33rd Army, the army recaptured Spas-Demensk on 13 August. Overcoming fierce German resistance, the army reached the line of Tsirkovschina and Zimtsy. Resuming the attack in the Yelnia-Dorogobuzh Offensive on 28 August, the army advanced through the forests south of Yelnya and crossed the Desna River and the Sozh River. On 28 September the army recaptured Mstsislaw, and in early October reached the Pronya River in the Drybin Raion, 35 kilometers north of Chavusy, where it went on the defensive.

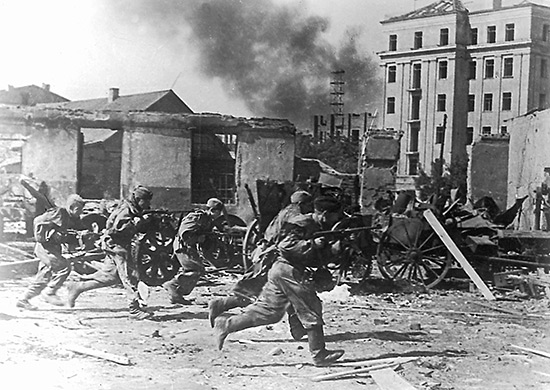
49th Army troops during the liberation of Mogilev, 28 June 1944

From 24 April 1944 to the end of the war, the 49th Army was subordinated to the 2nd Belorussian Front. From late June, the army fought in Operation Bagration, the Soviet strategic offensive in Belorussia and eastern Poland. During the Mogilev Offensive from 23 to 28 June, the 49th broke through German lines, crossed the Basya River, the Rasta River, and the Dnieper before storming Mogilev alongside the 50th Army on 28 June. Subsequently, the army fought in the Minsk Offensive between 29 June and 4 July. At the beginning of the second half of July, the army was regrouped southwest of Navahrudak. During the Belostock Offensive between 5 and 27 July, the 49th Army helped break stubborn German resistance between Grodno and Svislach. On 24 July, the army captured Sokółka, and by the end of 27 July reached the area north and west of the city. During August and early September the army fought in the Lublin–Brest Offensive, and by 15 September reached the Narew in the Łomża area, where it transitioned to defense.

From 13 January to 25 April 1945, the 49th Army fought in the East Prussian Offensive. Between 10 February and 4 April, it participated in the East Pomeranian Offensive. The army captured Czersk on 21 February and Berent on 8 March. The army continued its advance towards Danzig, which was taken on 30 March alongside the 2nd Shock Army, the 65th Army, and the 70th Army. The army's last operation was the Berlin Offensive, from 16 April to 8 May, during which it advanced in the main shock group of the front. At the end of the war, the 49th Army reached the Elbe in the Ludwigslust area, where it met troops of the British Second Army. It ended the war as part of the 2nd Belorussian Front, with the 42nd Rifle Division being among its units. The army became part of the Group of Soviet Occupation Forces in Germany when it was formed on 9 June, with headquarters at Wittenburg. Between July and August 1945, the army was relocated to Gorky Oblast and disbanded there in August. Its headquarters was used to form the headquarters of the Gorky Military District.

=== Russian Ground Forces ===
In 1990, there were three army corps in the North Caucasus Military District. Among them was the 12th Army Corps at Krasnodar, commanding the 9th Motor Rifle Division. 12th Army Corps had been formed by redesignation of 12th Rifle Corps in 1957. In May 1992, the 12th Army Corps became the 49th Army. 49th Army was then later redesignated 67th Army Corps on 1 October 1994.

After the 2008 Russian military reforms, 49CAA was formed in 2010 as part of the Southern Military District, headquartered at Stavropol. Its headquarters was established in the former Stavropol Institute of Communications of the Strategic Rocket Forces. Major General Sergey Kuralenko was appointed commander by a decree of January 9, 2011, with Major General Viktor Astapov as first deputy commander.

According to warfare.ru, 49CAA (listed at Stavropol/Maikop) had under control in late 2011 the 4th Guards and 7th Military Bases (South Ossetia and Abkhazia) and the 8th (former Taman Guards Motor Rifle Division), 33rd and 34th separate Mountain Motor Rifle Brigades (Borzoi, Chechnya, Maikop, and Storozhevaya-2), as well as the 66th Communications Brigade. In May 2012, Army deputy commander Viktor Astapov became the commander of the 49th Army. On 30 December 2013, Army deputy commander Major General Sergey Sevryukov became commander of the 49th Army.

As of 2015, milkavkaz identified the following as part of the army:

- Headquarters, Military Unit Number (MUN) 35181 (Stavropol)
- 205th Separate Cossack Motor Rifle Brigade, MUN 74814 (Budyonnovsk)
- 34th Separate Motor Rifle (Mountain) Brigade, MUN 01485 (Storozhevaya-2, Zelenchuksky District, Karachay-Cherkessia)
- 1st Guards Rocket Brigade, MUN 31853 (Molkino, Krasnodar Krai; equipped with Iskander-M)
- 227th Artillery Brigade, MUN 21797 (Krasnooktyabrsky)
- 66th Headquarters Brigade, MUN 41600 (Stavropol)
- 90th Anti-Aircraft Rocket Brigade, MUN 54821 (Afipsky; equipped with Buk-M2)
- 99th Separate Material and Technical Support Brigade, MUN 72153 (Maykop)
- 19th Separate Spetsnaz Company (Stavropol) (82760)
- 32nd Engineer-Sapper Regiment, MUN 23094 (Afipsky)
- 17th NBC Protection Regiment (Krasnodar Krai)
- 95th Separate Electronic Warfare Battalion (Mozdok)
- 7th Military Base (Abkhazia, Russian-occupied Georgia)

In 2023 49 CAA was identified with:

- 205th Separate Cossack Motor Rifle Brigade (в/ч 74814)
- 34th Separate Motor Rifle (Mountain) Brigade (в/ч 01485)
- 7th Military Base (в/ч 09332)
- 227th Artillery Brigade (в/ч 13714)
- 1st Missile Brigade (в/ч 31853)
- 90th Anti-Aircraft Rocket Brigade (в/ч 54821)

==== Involvement in Russian invasion of Ukraine ====
According to David Axe of Forbes, as of July 2022, the 49th Combined Arms Army was the main Russian force in the Kherson region in southern Ukraine, and consisted of as many as 10,000 troops.

It was claimed on 25 March 2022 by Oleksiy Arestovych that the commander of the 49th Combined Arms Army, Yakov Rezantsev, was killed during a series of Ukrainian strikes on the Kherson International Airport. However, as of February 2023, Rezantsev was listed as alive in a Ukrainian war criminals database.

As of June 2023, Colonel Sergey Vasilyevich Leonov was the acting army commander.

It is reported that a deputy commander of the unit, Major General Valery Plokhotnyuk, died at the 2026 Moscow bombing at the Balzi Rossi restaurant.

== Commanders ==
=== World War II ===
During World War II, the 49th Army was commanded by the following officers:

- Lieutenant General Ivan Zakharkin (August 1941 – June 1943)
- Lieutenant General (promoted to Colonel General March 1945) Ivan Grishin (June 1943 – June 1945)

=== 21st Century ===
Since 2010, the 49CAA has had the following commanders:

- Major General Sergey Kuralenko (January 2011 – May 2012)
- Major General Viktor Astapov (May 2012 – December 2013)
- Major General Sergey Sevryukov (December 2013 – July 2019)
- Major General Mikhail Zusko (July 2019 – August 2020)
- Lieutenant General Yakov Rezantsev (August 2020 – June 2023)
- Colonel Sergey Leonov (2023; acting)
- Lieutenant General Mikhail Kosobokov (2023 – present)
