= 44th Division (Imperial Japanese Army) =

- Active: 1944 - 1945
- Country: Empire of Japan
- Branch: Imperial Japanese Army
- Type: Infantry
- Size: 14000
- Garrison/HQ: Osaka
- Nickname(s): Orange Division
- Engagements: none

The 44th Division (第44師団, Dai-yonjūyon Shidan) was an infantry division of the Imperial Japanese Army. Its call sign was the Orange Division (橘兵団, Tachibana Heidan).

The 44th Division was organized on 4 April 1944, simultaneously with the 81st and 86th divisions as a defiant action against popular Japanese Tetraphobia superstition. The nucleus was the headquarters of the 4th Division. Originally the 44th Division was assigned to the Central District Army.

In March 1945, the 44th Division was sent to Takahagi, Ibaraki, arriving 8 April 1945. The division was re-subordinated to the 51st Army 18 April 1945 and assigned to the role of the mobile reserve. The surrender of Japan on 15 August 1945 had happened before the 44th Division could engage with the enemy.

Colonel Hiroshi Muraoka (村岡弘大佐, Muraoka Hiroshi Taisa) served as chief of staff for the 44th Division from 6 April 1944 until the end of the war.

== Defense map ==
Japanese infantry and armored units in Home Islands, 15 August 1945
