= 7th Guards Mountain Air Assault Division =

Russian Airborne Troops formation

7th Guards Mountain Air Assault Division (1 Dec 2006 – present) 7th Guards Airborne Division (Sep 1948 – 1 Dec 2006)
- Russian: 7-я гвардейская десантно-штурмовая (горная) Краснознамённая орденов Суворова и Кутузова дивизия
- Great emblem of the 7th Guards Mountain Air Assault Division
- Active: 1942–1945 (1st formation); 1948–present (2nd formation)
- Country: Soviet Union (1942–1991); Russia (1991–present)
- Branch: Russian Airborne Forces
- Part of: Russian Armed Forces
- Garrison/HQ: Novorossiysk
- Mottos: Мужество, отвага, честь! (Courage, valor, honor!)
- Engagements: World War II; Hungarian Revolution of 1956; Operation Danube; Black January; First Chechen War; Second Chechen War; War of Dagestan; Russo-Ukrainian War; War in Donbas; Invasion of Ukraine; Southern Ukraine offensive; Battle of Kherson; Battle of Mykolaiv; 2023 Ukrainian Counteroffensive
- Decorations: Guards; Order of the Red Banner; Order of Suvorov; Order of Kutuzov

Commanders
- Current commander: Unknown
- Notable commanders: Maj. Gen. Dmitry Drychkin; Maj. Gen. Andrei Sukhovetsky †

The 7th Guards Mountain Red Banner, Orders of Suvorov and Kutuzov Air Assault Division is the only elite guards (other than Spetsnaz VDV) division of the Russian Airborne Forces (VDV) (Military Unit Number 61756) responsible for mountain warfare and jungle warfare.

The 7th Guards Airborne Division was formed in September 1948 based on 322nd Guards Rifle Regiment which fought in Eastern Europe in World War II. In October 1948 the division was relocated to Kaunas, Lithuania. During the Cold War period, the division served in the suppression of the Hungarian and Czech revolutions. In August 1993, the division was relocated to Novorossisk, Russia. It took part in various counter-insurgency operations in the Caucasus region. On 1 December 2006 it was renamed as 7th Guards Mountain Air Assault Division.

In 2014 the division's 247th Guards Air Assault Regiment took part in the war in Donbas in Ukraine.

Since February 2022 the division has been heavily engaged in the invasion of Ukraine. It successfully captured the Antonov Bridge in Kherson Oblast during an air assault, but was pushed back from its attempt to capture Mykolaiv.

== History ==
There were two separately formed 7th Guards Airborne Divisions in the Red Army and Soviet Ground Forces/Soviet Airborne Troops. The first division was formed during the Second World War at Ramenskoye in December 1942. It fought at Demyansk, Voronezh, Korsun, on the Dnieper River, and at Targul Frumos and Budapest. It ended the war with 4th Guards Army of the 3rd Ukrainian Front in May 1945. As part of a postwar military reorganization, this division was retitled the 115th Guards Rifle Division in June 1945. The second formation of the 7th Guards Airborne Division was started in September 1948 based on 322nd Guards Rifle Regiment.

External images
- Generals Reinhart and Drichkin
- 50th Anniversary Memorial

=== First formation (1942–1945) ===
The first formation of the division was formed during the Second World War at Ramenskoye in December 1942. It fought at Demyansk, Voronezh, Korsun, on the Dnieper River, and at Targul Frumos and Budapest. It gained the honorific "Cherkassy." (Poirer and Connor, p76)

On May 8, 1945, the divisional commander, Major General Dmitrii Aristarkhovich Drichkin, set up his headquarters in the village of Erlauf, Austria, some 60 miles west of Vienna and 50 miles east of Linz. Anxious to meet the Allies, he sent out scouts. At midnight, he met Major General Stanley Eric Reinhart, commander of the U.S. 65th Infantry Division. For the duration of their presence on the Danube river, both commanders continued to cooperate in an unusually effective manner.

Twenty years later, public affairs officer Captain John J. Pullen described their first cordial encounter for the National Observer. For the 50th anniversary, Erlauf erected a Soviet-sponsored memorial. It features a local girl, linking arms with a GI on her right, and a Soviet soldier on her left. To this day, an enlarged photo and a small exhibit mark the spot where this historic encounter took place: A life-size Major General Reinhart, smiling at General Drichkin, as they compare their watches one minute past midnight, on 9 May 1945, the moment the unconditional surrender of Germany became effective.

As part of a postwar military reorganization at the end of June 1945, the first formation of the 7th Guards Airborne Division was retitled as the 115th Guards Rifle Division. The 22nd Guards Tank Division was activated on 4 June 1957 in Novomoskovsk (Cherkasskoye), Dnepropetrovsk Oblast, from the 115th Guards Rifle Division.

=== Second formation (1948–present) ===
The baptism of fire of the second formation division's predecessor regiment took place in 1945, fighting around Lake Balaton (Hungary) under the 37th Guards Rifle Corps, 9th Guards Army, 3rd Ukrainian Front. On 26 April 1945, the 322nd Guards Rifle Regiment of the 103rd Guards Rifle Division was awarded the Order of Kutuzov, second class, for exemplary performance. In commemoration, the division's official day is 26 April, by an order of the Defense Minister of the USSR.

At the end of the war, the 322nd Guards Rifle Regiment was in the city of Třeboň, Czechoslovakia. During the war, the regiment was thanked on six occasions by Stalin, the Supreme Commander. In all 2,065 of its soldiers, sergeants and officers were decorated for valor and heroism by the Soviet Union.

The 7th Guards Airborne Division (second formation) was established on 15 October 1948 on the basis of the 322nd Guards Air Landing Regiment of the 103rd Guards Airborne Division at Polotsk in the Belorussian Military District, becoming part of the 8th Guards Airborne Corps. The division was relocated to the cities of Kaunas and Marijampolė, Lithuanian SSR. Personnel from these bases took part in actions against Lithuanian partisans.

Units in this premier division of airborne troops have mastered the landing of Antonov An-8, An-12, An-22, and Il-76 aircraft, tested a number of new parachute systems (D-5 and D-6), all generations of BMD, and 2S9 Nona artillery systems.

In 1956, the division was involved in "Operation Whirlwind", the suppression of the Hungarian revolution. On 3 November 1956, the 108th Parachute Regiment landed at the Tököl airbase in Il-12 and Li-2 aircraft, capturing and disabling six antiaircraft batteries, then positioning themselves to defend the base. On 4 November 1956 the regimental staff, together with fighters from the 119th Parachute Regiment, entered the city of Budapest and took part in street fighting until the city was secured on 7 November.

In 1968, the division participated in Operation Danube to suppress the Prague Spring uprising. The 108th Regiment distinguished itself in the most dangerous and difficult missions, for which about two hundred of its personnel received high government awards.

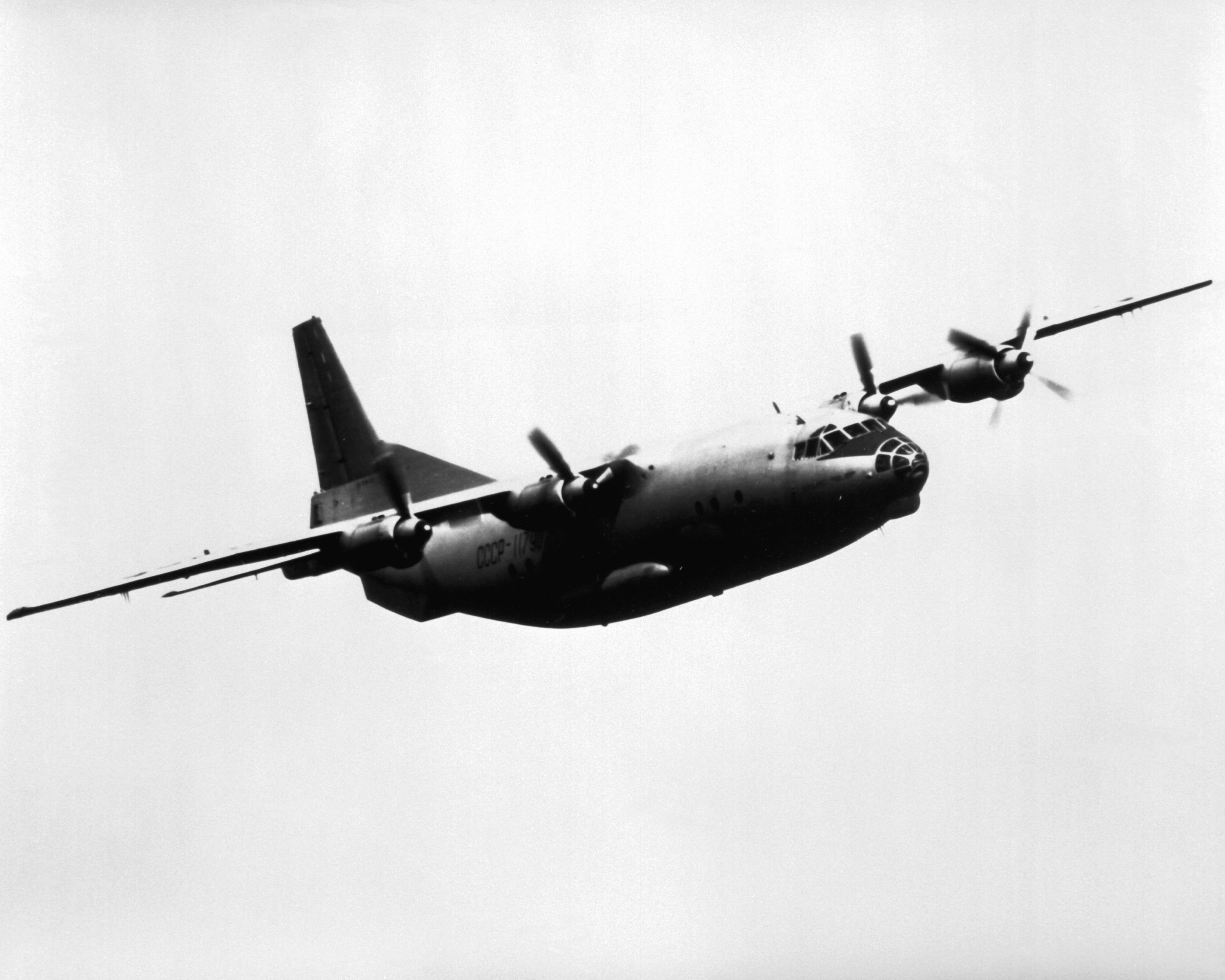
An-12 Soviet military-transport plane

On 23 June 1969, troops of the 108th Airborne Regiment were tasked to fly from Kaunas to Ryazan, where they were to demonstrate their vehicle assault landing skills to the Minister of Defence of the USSR, Andrei Grechko. The group of three An-12 aircraft took off early in the morning, reaching a cruising altitude of 3,000 metres (9,800 ft). Approaching the city of Kaluga, a plane carrying the staff of a company and battalion command (91 officers and men) collided with an Ilyushin Il-14 passenger plane that was at 3000 meters without clearance, with the loss of all aboard.

The division was involved in many major exercises and maneuvers, such as "Shield-76", "Neman", "West-81" (Exercise Zapad-81), "West-84" and "Watch-86", in the latter three exercises dropping airborne combat vehicles with crews, and receiving the Minister of Defence of the USSR Pennant "for courage and military prowess" during West-81.

In 1971 and 1972, the division was awarded the Red Banner of the Airborne Troops. On 4 May 1985, for success in military training and in connection with the 40th anniversary of the Victory in World War II, the division was awarded the Order of the Red Banner.

In 1988–1989, elements of the division took part in the Black January events in Baku.

==== In Russian Armed Forces ====
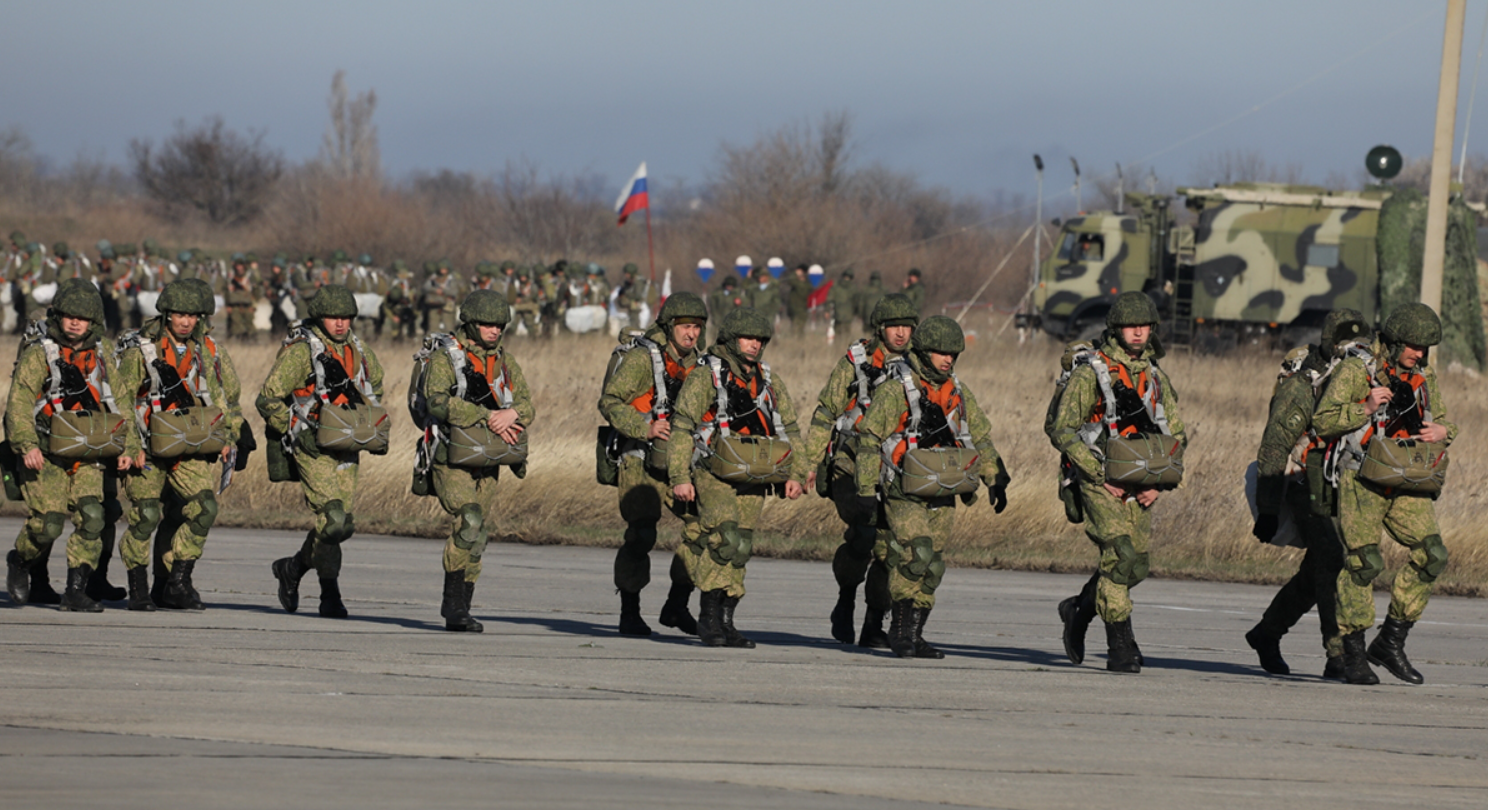
Paratroopers of the 7th Guards Air Assault Division. Russia

In 1993–1996, personnel from the 108th Regiment served on peacekeeping missions in Abkhazia to deal with the aftermath of the War in Abkhazia of 1992–1993.

At some point after 1990 the division was given the 'Mountain' designation.

Between January 1995 and April 2004, the 108th Regiment fought in the North Caucasian region, notably in the August 1999 battle for the "Donkey's Ear" heights in Dagestan. In 1997, the division's 97th Guards Airborne Regiment was disbanded.

In August 2014 the division's 247th Guards Air Assault Regiment fought in the Battle of Ilovaisk during the war in Donbas, Ukraine. The division was subsequently awarded the Order of Suvorov in May 2015.

In December 2016, Vladimir Shamanov announced that a separate battalion of the division's 97th Air Assault Regiment would be formed in Dzhankoy, with the rest of the regiment reformed from the battalion in the future. The regiment was reported forming in 2021 in Novostepove Crimea. In the same year, it was announced that the 56th Guards Air Assault Brigade would also be re-deployed to Crimea where it would reform as a regiment and perhaps further augment the strength of the 7th Division. This plan to integrate the regiment into the 7th division was reportedly later confirmed by the Russian defence ministry. In that same month, and in the context of the Russia-Ukraine crisis, the 247th Regiment of the division was also reported to have been forward deployed in Crimea.

In the initial stages of the invasion of Ukraine, on 24 February 2022, a successful air assault by the 7th Guards Division seized the Antonov Bridge east of Kherson. The division pushed towards the city and beyond it. By 2 March 2022, the entire division and some attached Ground Forces units were raiding and cordoning off Mykolaiv. However, the division was unable to take control of the city and suffered significant casualties from Ukrainian counterattacks.

== Equipment ==
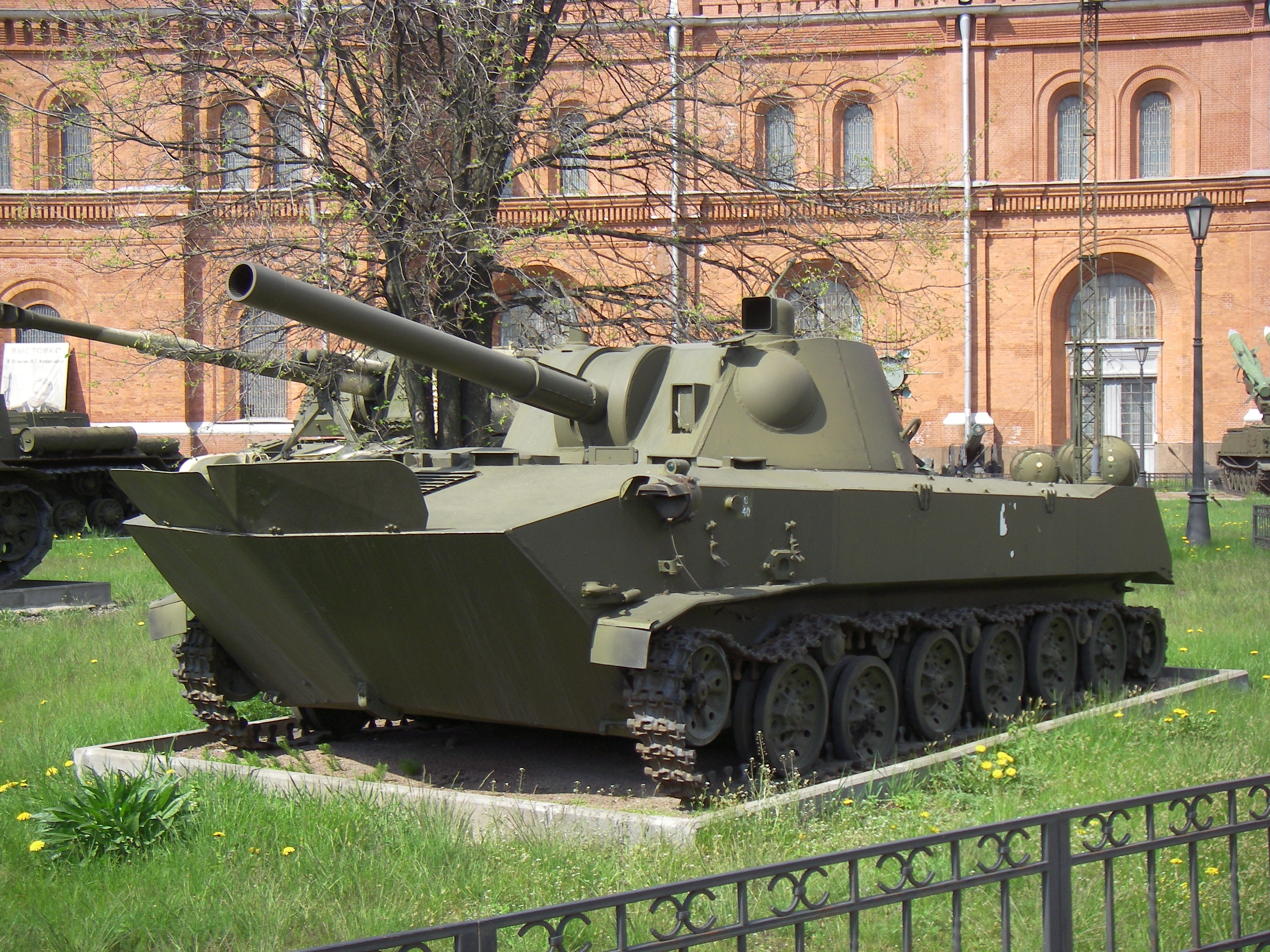
2S9 Nona self-propelled artillery vehicle

The division's equipment includes the BMD-1, BMD-2 and BTR-D vehicles, with the anti-aircraft BTR-ZD and anti-tank BTR-RD "Robot" variants of the BTR-D. The BTR-RD was equipped with the 9М111 "Bassoon" anti-tank rocket systems (capable of firing twelve 9М111 "Bassoon" or 9М113 "Competition" anti-tank guided missiles at a time). Artillery vehicles include the 2S9 "Nona" 120 mm self-propelled artillery vehicle and the 1В119 reconnaissance and fire-control vehicle.

== Commanders ==
- Guards Major General Dmitrii Aristarkhovich Drychkin (1943–1945);
- Guards Major General Gregory Fedoseevich Polishchuk (1945–1952);
- Guards Colonel Georgy Golofastov (1952–1955);
- Guards Major General Alexei Pavlovich Rudakov (1955–1956);
- Guards Colonel Peter Fëdorovich Antipov (1956–1958);
- Guards Colonel Ivan Makarovich Dudura (1958–1961);
- Guards Major General Peter Vasilevich Chaplygin (1961–1963);
- Guards Major General Dmitry Grigorevich Shkrudiev (1963–1966);
- Guards Major General Lev Nikolaevich Gorelov (1966–1970);
- Guards Major General Oleg Fyodorovich Kuleshov (1970–1973);
- Guards Major General Nikolai Vasilevich Kalinin (1973–1975);
- Guards Major General Vladimir Stepanovich Kraev (1975–1978);
- Guards Major General Vladislav Aleksyeevich Achalov (1978–1982);
- Guards Colonel Yurantin Vasilyevich Yarygin (1982–1984);
- Guards Major General Vladimir Mihailovich Toporov (1984–1987);
- Guards Major General Aleksey Aleksyeevich Sigutkin (1987–1990);
- Guards Major General Valery Frantsovich Hatskevich (1990–1992);
- Guards Major General Grigory Andryeevich Kalabuhov (1992–1994);
- Guards Major General Igor Vilevich Solonin (1994–1997);
- Guards Major General Yuri Mihaĭlovich Krivoshyeev (1997–2002);
- Guards Major General Nikolai Ivanovich Ignatov (2002–2005);
- Guards Major General Viktor Borisovich Astapov (2005–2007);
- Guards Colonel Vladimir Anatolyevich Kochetkov (2008–2010);
- Guards Major General Aleksandr Yurevich Vyaznikov (2010–2012);
- Guards Major General Valery Nikolayevich Solodchuk (2012–2014);
- Major General Roman Aleksandrovich Breus (2014–2019);
- Guards Major General Andrei Aleksandrovich Sukhovetsky (2019–2021);
- Guards Major General Aleksandr Kornev (2021–2025)

== Division units ==
- Division HQ (Military Unit Number 61756)
  - 3rd Anti-aircraft Missile Regiment (94021)
  - 6th Maintenance and Recovery Battalion
  - 162nd Intelligence Battalion (54377)
  - 185th Military Transport Aviation Squadron (Krymsk, Krasnodar Krai)
  - 286th Courier Station Mail Service
  - 629th Engineer-Sapper Battalion (96404)
  - 743rd Guards Signal Battalion (96527)
  - 967th Landing Support Company
  - 1681st Material Support Battalion (Anapa)
  - 3995th Military Hospital (airmobile)
- 97th Air Assault Regiment (with 171st Separate Air Assault Battalion of the Regiment deployed in Crimea) (status of the 97th Air Assault Regiment unclear in 2022)
- 56th Guards Air Assault Regiment (located in Feodosia, Crimea and integrated into the division effective in December 2021)
- 108th Guards Airborne Regiment (Novorossiysk) (42091).
- 247th Guards Air Assault Regiment (Stavropol; reported forward deployed to Crimea as of December 2021) (54801)
- 387th Motor Rifle Regiment (Tula) (tbd); Subordinated to the 7th at least from July - October 2023, core of the newly forming 44th Air Assault Division
- 1141st Guards Artillery Regiment (Anapa) (40515)

== Gallery ==
7th Guards Airborne Division shoulder sleeve insignia (1993–2006)

7th Guards Airborne Division shoulder sleeve patch
