= 81st Division (Imperial Japanese Army) =

- 第81師団
- Active: 1944 - 1945
- Country: Empire of Japan
- Allegiance: 36th army
- Branch: Imperial Japanese Army
- Type: Infantry
- Garrison/HQ: Utsunomiya
- Nickname: Nō Division
- Engagements: none

The 81st Division (第81師団, Dai-hachijūichi Shidan) was an infantry division in the Imperial Japanese Army. Its call sign was the Nō Division (納兵団, Nō Heidan). It was created 4 April 1944 in Utsunomiya, simultaneously with the 44th and 86th divisions. It was a triangular division. The men of the division were drafted through Utsunomiya mobilization district, although the divisional backbone was the 51st division headquarters.

== Action ==
The 81st division was assigned to the 36th army 21 July 1944. Because the troops were engaged in farming for self-sustenance, and of the pronunciation of the divisional call sign, the 81st division was also jokingly called "Agricultural division". The division spent the time until the surrender of Japan 15 August 1945 building fortifications around Yūki, Ibaraki and did not engage in actual combat.

Japanese infantry and armored units in Home Islands, 15 August 1945

== References and further reading ==
- List of Japanese Infantry Divisions
- Madej, W. Victor. Japanese Armed Forces Order of Battle, 1937-1945 [2 vols] Allentown, PA: 1981

This article incorporates material from the article 第81師団 (日本軍) in the Japanese Wikipedia, retrieved on 20 June 2016.
