= 387th Motor Rifle Regiment =

Russian Military Unit

- 387-й мотострелковый полк
- Active: October 2022 – present
- Country: Russia
- Branch: Russian Airborne Forces
- Size: Regiment
- Part of: 44th Air Assault Division (2023); 7th Guards Mountain Air Assault Division (2023-Present)
- Engagements: Russian invasion of Ukraine: Dnieper campaign; 2023 Ukrainian counteroffensive

The 387th Motor Rifle Regiment (Russian: 387-й мотострелковый полк; Military Unit Number 11180) is a tactical formation of the Russian Airborne Forces. The regiment was formed in October 2022 during the partial mobilization in Russia. It was originally placed under command of the newly formed 44th Air Assault Division, but by July 2023, it was transferred to the 7th Guards Mountain Air Assault Division.

== History ==
The first known deployment of the regiment was on the East Bank of the Dnieper River in early March 2023. By June, they had been pushed back to the West bank, where the Deputy Chief of Staff of the regiment, Major Denis Nikolaevich Zharkov was killed.

By August 2023, they were transferred to the Robotyne area, Zaporizhzhia Oblast.

In September 2023, their artillery unit was geolocated in the Verbove area, Zaporizhzhia Oblast.
