= Andrei Sukhovetsky =

Russian general (1974–2022)

Major General Andrei Sukhovetsky
- Андрей Суховецкий
- Sukhovetsky in 2021
- Born: 25 June 1974; Melitopol, Ukrainian SSR, Soviet Union
- Died: 28 February 2022 (aged 47); Donetsk Oblast, Ukraine
- Military career
- Allegiance: Russia
- Branch: Russian Airborne Forces
- Service years: 1995–2022
- Rank: Major general
- Commands: 7th Guards Mountain Air Assault Division
- Conflicts: Russo-Georgian War; Syrian Civil War; Russo-Ukrainian War; Annexation of Crimea; Russian invasion of Ukraine †

Andrei Aleksandrovich Sukhovetsky (Russian: Андрей Александрович Суховецкий; 25 June 1974 – 28 February 2022) was a Russian Airborne Forces major general (one-star rank). He was killed in action during the Russian invasion of Ukraine. Sukhovetsky's last assignment was as deputy commander of the 41st Combined Arms Army, a Russian Ground Forces command participating in the invasion of Ukraine. Conflicting reports of the place of his death have arisen, though his death itself is regarded as confirmed.

== Biography ==
Sukhovetsky was born on 25 June 1974. He graduated from the Ryazan Guards Higher Airborne Command School in 1995, and initially served as a platoon commander before gradually rising in the ranks. The Independent described him as a "respected paratrooper". He served in military operations in the North Caucasus, including in Chechnya, and fought in Abkhazia during the Russo-Georgian War of 2008. In the following year, he graduated from the Combined Arms Academy.

Sukhovetsky was decorated for his role in the annexation of Crimea by the Russian Federation in 2014 and subsequently also participated in the Russian military intervention in the Syrian civil war. In 2018, he graduated from the Military Academy of the General Staff of the Armed Forces of Russia. From 2019 to 2021, Sukhovetsky headed the 7th Guards Mountain Air Assault Division. Promoted to major general, Sukhovetsky was appointed deputy commander of the 41st Combined Arms Army in October 2021. In this role, he fought in the Russian invasion of Ukraine. He also was a Spetsnaz commander. Sukhovetsky was a highly decorated soldier, having been awarded 14 medals.

=== Death ===
Sukhovetsky was killed in combat in Ukraine on 28 February 2022. According to Ukrainian sources, he was shot by a sniper, either in the city of Hostomel or when landing at Hostomel Airport. According to one report, he had ventured to the front of the stalled Russian Kyiv convoy. In contrast, another report claimed that he died near Mariupol, which was besieged by Russian forces at the time; however, the 41st Army operated near Chernihiv, far from the Mariupol area.

His death was first reported by Andrei Terekhov, a retired Russian intelligence officer, on Twitter on 1 March. It was also reported by Sergey Chipilev, a former colleague of his in the airborne forces, on the VKontakte social networking service on 2 March, though he deleted his account the next day. Vladimir Myshkin, an official of the Combat Brotherhood, a Russian veterans group, confirmed on 3 March that he and others had heard of the death. President Vladimir Putin later mentioned in a speech that he had been killed. Military historian Jack McCall notes that Sukhovetsky is the second Russian general to have been killed as a direct result of combat with Ukrainian combatants since the death of General Nikolai F. Vatutin in 1944.

== See also ==
- List of Russian generals killed during the Russian invasion of Ukraine
