= 86th Division (Imperial Japanese Army) =

- 第86師団
- Active: 1944 - 1945
- Country: Empire of Japan
- Branch: Imperial Japanese Army
- Type: Infantry
- Nickname: Pile division
- Engagements: none

The 86th Division (第86師団, Dai-hachijūroku Shidan) was an infantry division in the Imperial Japanese Army. Its call sign was the Pile Division (積兵団, Seki Heidan). It was created 4 April 1944 in Kurume, simultaneously with the 44th and 81st divisions. It was a triangular division. The divisional backbone was the 56th division headquarters.

== Action ==
The 86th division was assigned to the Western District Army upon formation, and garrisoned Miyakonojō. It was transferred to 57th army and tasked with the coastal defense of Shibushi, Kagoshima a year later, 8 April 1945. Because Operation Downfall was never implemented, the 86th division has spent time until surrender of Japan 15 August 1945 fortifying positions without seeing an actual combat.

Japanese infantry and armored units in Home Islands, 15 August 1945

== References and further reading ==
- List of Japanese Infantry Divisions
- Madej, W. Victor. Japanese Armed Forces Order of Battle, 1937-1945 [2 vols] Allentown, PA: 1981

This article incorporates material from the article 第86師団 (日本軍) in the Japanese Wikipedia, retrieved on 21 June 2016.
