= Fifty-First Army (Japan) =

Japanese Fifty-First Army
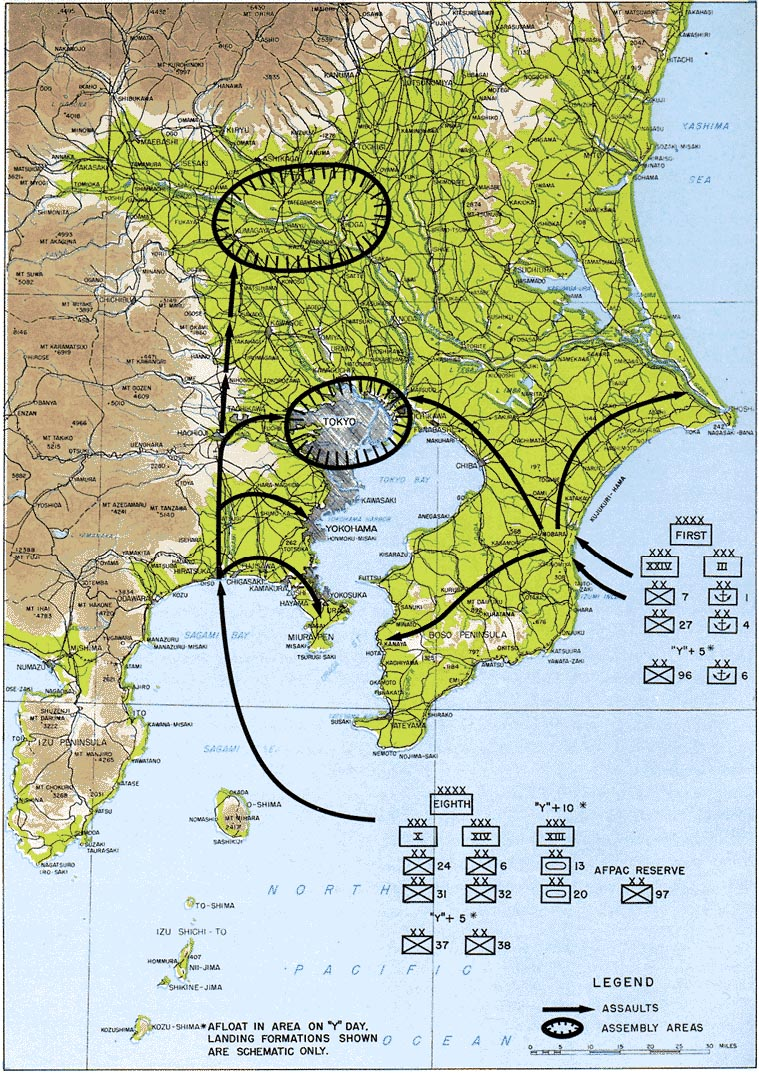
- Landing Map for Operation Downfall
- Active: April 18, 1945 – August 15, 1945
- Country: Empire of Japan
- Branch: Imperial Japanese Army
- Type: Infantry
- Role: Corps
- Garrison/HQ: Tsuchiura, Ibaraki
- Nickname(s): Ken (建, Build)
- Engagements: Operation Downfall

The Japanese 51st Army (第51軍, Dai-gojyūichi gun) was an army of the Imperial Japanese Army during World War II.

== History ==
The Japanese 51st Army was formed on April 8, 1945, under the Japanese Twelfth Area Army as part of the last desperate defense effort by the Empire of Japan to deter possible landings of Allied forces in central Honshū during Operation Downfall. The Japanese 51st Army was based in Tsuchiura, Ibaraki Prefecture and was thus intended to guard the northern beachhead to Tokyo and the Kantō region. It consisted mostly of poorly trained reservists, conscripted students and Volunteer Fighting Corps home guard militia. The Japanese 51st Army was demobilized at the surrender of Japan on August 15, 1945, without having seen combat.

== List of Commanders ==
	Name	From	To
Commanding officer	Lieutenant General Kengoro Noda	8 April 1945	15 August 1945
Chief of Staff	Major General Yoshio Sakai	6 April 1945	1 September 1945
