= 247th Guards Air Assault Regiment =

Russian Airborne Troops unit

247th Guards Air Assault Regiment (2013–present) 247th Air Assault Regiment (1998–2013) 21st Airborne Brigade (1 Jun 1990–1 May 1998) 21st Air Assault Brigade (19 Feb 1973–1 Jun 1990)
- Russian: 247-й гвардейский десантно-штурмовой Кавказский казачий полк
- 247th Guards Air Assault Regiment shoulder sleeve insignia
- Active: 1973–present
- Country: Soviet Union (1973–1991); Russia (1991–present)
- Branch: Russian Airborne Forces
- Size: 1,500 troops
- Part of: 7th Guards Mountain Air Assault Division
- Garrison/HQ: Stavropol; MUN 54801
- Nickname: Caucasian Cossacks
- Engagements: First Chechen War; War of Dagestan; Second Chechen War; Russo-Georgian War; War in Donbas • Battle of Ilovaisk; Russian invasion of Ukraine
- Battle honours: Guards

Commanders
- Current commander: Colonel Roman Yuvakayev
- Notable commanders: Colonel Yury Em

The 247th Guards Air Assault Regiment (Russian: 247-й гвардейский десантно-штурмовой Кавказский казачий полк) is a regiment of the Russian Airborne Troops, currently part of the 7th Guards Mountain Air Assault Division. It was first formed in 1973 as the 21st Air Assault Brigade and was transferred to the Soviet Airborne Troops in 1990, becoming the 21st Airborne Brigade. The brigade was renamed the 247th Air Assault Regiment in 1998. In 1998, it also gained the title 'Caucasian Cossack', although it is not all composed of Cossacks. In 2013 it became a Guards regiment. The unit fought in the First Chechen War, the War of Dagestan, the Second Chechen War, the Russo-Georgian War, the War in Donbas, and the Russian invasion of Ukraine.

== History ==
=== Soviet Union ===
The regiment was first formed on 19 February 1973 as the 21st Air Assault Brigade in Kutaisi, part of the Transcaucasus Military District. It included personnel from the 337th Guards Airborne Regiment. The brigade was initially composed of the 802nd, 803rd, and 804th Air Assault Battalions. Along with the 11th and 13th Separate Airborne Brigades, the brigade served as a test unit for the Soviet airmobile concept. In 1973, the brigade participated in the exercise "Snowy Pass" (Russian: Снежный перевал). The brigade conducted advanced tactical exercises under the supervision of the Chief of the General Staff in 1974.

In September 1977, the brigade's 1059th Artillery Battalion was disbanded and replaced by an artillery battery and an anti-aircraft battery. Around the same time, the brigade's 1171st Aviation Group became the 325th Transport-Combat and 395th Combat Helicopter Regiments.

The brigade participated in the "West-81" exercises in 1981. It was involved in the exercise "Caucasus-85". Elements of the brigade participated in the cleanup operations after the Chernobyl disaster in 1986. The brigade participated in exercise "Caucasus-87" in the following year. Its 292nd and 325th Helicopter Regiments were detached in 1988. In 1989, the brigade received a Red Banner from the Transcaucasus Military District Military Council. The brigade air-assaulted Yerevan Airport in July 1989 after it was occupied by armed Armenians. On 12 July, it landed at Leninakan to assist in rescue after the 1988 Armenian earthquake. In 1990, it received the Minister of Defense's Pennant "For Courage and Valor". On 1 June 1990, it was transferred to the Soviet airborne and renamed as the 21st Airborne Brigade.

=== Russia ===
In 1992, the brigade relocated to Stavropol. In 1994, the brigade received the honorific "Stavropol Cossack". From 11 December 1994 to November 1996, the brigade fought in the First Chechen War. Colonel Yury Em became brigade commander in 1995. On 1 May 1998, it was renamed the 247th Air Assault Regiment and became part of the 7th Guards Airborne Division. On 12 September, it received the title "Caucasian Cossack", despite not being all composed of Cossacks.

From August 1999, the regiment fought in the War of Dagestan. It fought in the Battle for Donkey's Ear Height. From October 1999 to January 2000, the regiment fought in the Second Chechen War. The regiment fought in the battles for Shelkovskaya, Gudermes, Shali, and Argun. On 25 November 1999, the regiment captured Novogroznensky, reportedly killing more than 50 Chechen militants. Regimental commander Em received the title Hero of the Russian Federation for his leadership.

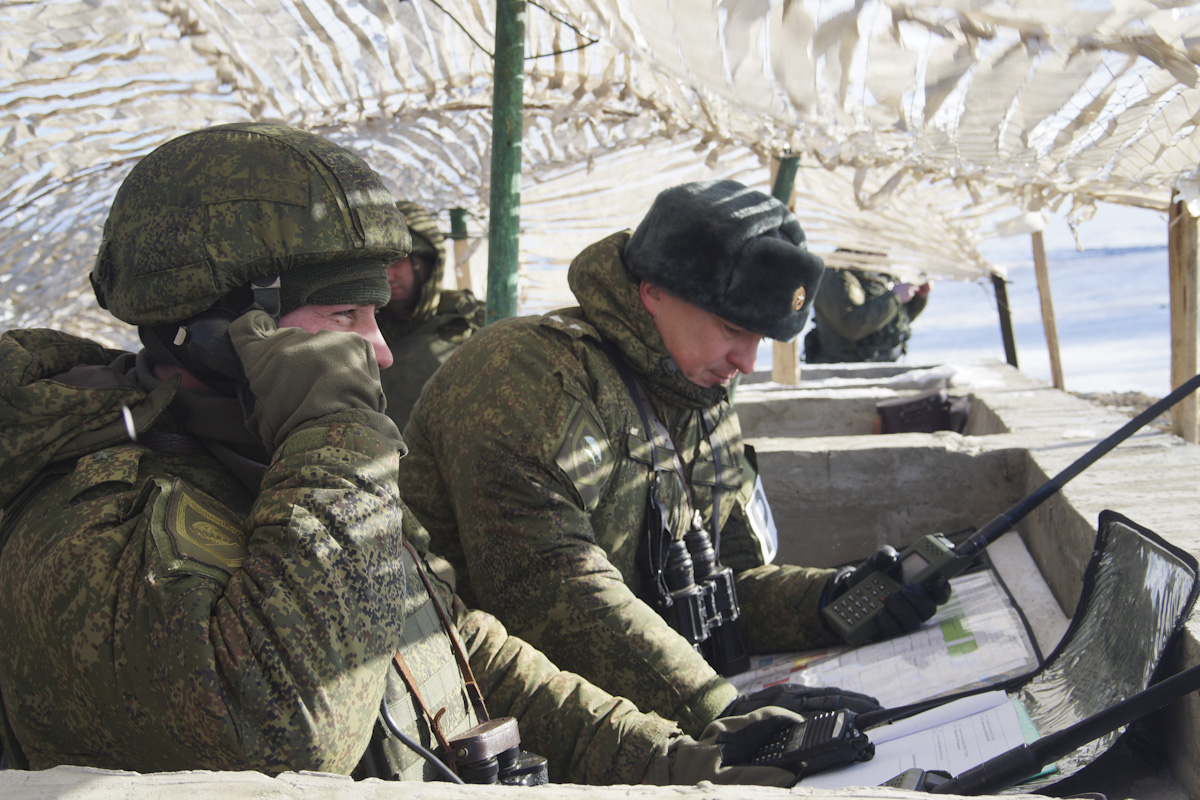
Soldiers of the regiment during a tactical exercise in Stavropol Krai, 2018

Colonel Alexey Naumets became the regiment's commander on 2 June 2007. In 2008, the regiment invaded Georgia with the rest of the division. It fought in the Battle of Kodori Gorge. The regiment was granted the title 'Guards' on 3 June 2013. The regiment contributed a battalion tactical group to participate in the August 2014 Russian military intervention in the war in Donbas. A group took part in the battle of Ilovaisk, where a column of regiments' fighting vehicles was photographed by regiment's soldier in front of destroyed R-149BMR command vehicle of the Ukrainian 121st Signal Brigade. In March 2015, the regiment opened its museum in Stavropol.

In the context of the Russia-Ukraine crisis, as of December 2021, the regiment was deployed in Crimea. It took part in the Russian invasion of Ukraine and its commander Guard Colonel Konstantin Zizevsky was killed in action in February 2022. According to Pavel Filatyev, a former soldier of the 56th Guards Air Assault Regiment, the 247th Regiment was among the Russian military units that entered Kherson on 1 March 2022. An ammunition depot and a command post of the 247th Guards Air Assault Regiment was destroyed by Ukrainian forces on 22 August 2022 during the 2022 Chornobaivka attacks.

The Regiment took part the Southern Military District's efforts to hold Staromaiorske during the 2023 Ukrainian counteroffensive. Ukrainian forces advanced through the grey-zone villages around Staromaiorske and Urozhaine but suffered severe losses and were stopped well before reaching the first main Russian defensive line. In September 2023 the regiment was deployed at the southern theatre around the village of Verbove, where its commander Vasily Popov was killed in action. In October 2023, the regiment operated in the Orikhiv direction.

== Composition ==
Structure in 2017

- Command,
- 1st airborne assault battalion,
- 2nd airborne assault battalion,
- 1st parachute assault battalion,
- self-propelled artillery division,
- anti-tank battery,
- anti-aircraft battery,
- reconnaissance company,
- engineer and sapper company,
- communications company,
- airborne support company,
- logistics company,
- repair company,
- medical company,
- NBC protection platoon,
- artillery chief's command platoon,
- commandant's platoon.

1,760 personnel, armed with: 108 units BMD-2, 42 units BTR-D, 1 unit BMD-1R, 7 units KShM (6 units BMD-1, 1 unit R-149BMRD), 6 units BTR-RD "Robot" (with ATGM 9K113 Konkurs), 9 units BTR-ZD "Skrezhet" (with ZU-23-2 and MANPADS), 8 units 1V119] "Rheostat", 18 units. 2S9 "Nona-S".

== Commanders ==
Parachute landing of the 247th Airborne Regiment at the Okhchi-Oba landing site in Crimea with the task of capturing a simulated enemy airfield, March 19, 2021.

The following officers commanded the 21st Air Assault Brigade, the 21st Airborne Brigade, the 247th Air Assault Regiment, and the 247th Guards Air Assault Regiment:

- Colonel Viktor Fyodorovich Pugachev (1973–1975)
- Colonel Viktor Musiyenko (1975–1980)
- Colonel Nikolai Pletnev (1980–1983)
- Colonel Albert Bondar (1983–1984)
- Colonel Ivan Kolesnikov (1984–1986)
- Colonel Vitaly Zababurin (1986–1989)
- Colonel Valentin Vasilyevich Marin (1989–1995)
- Colonel Yury Em (1995–2001)
- Colonel Alexander Yevgenyevich Medvedev (2001–2003)
- Colonel Alexei Ragozin (2003–2007)
- Colonel Alexei Naumets (2007–2009)
- Colonel Dmitry Ovcharov (2009–April 2011)
- Colonel Alexander Valitov (April 2011–2013)
- Colonel Sergei Maximov (2013)
- Colonel Roman Yuvakayev (? – ?)
- Colonel Konstantin Zizevsky (2020 – February 26, 2022), killed during the 2022 Russian invasion of Ukraine.
- Colonel Pyotr Popov (? – August/September 2023)
- Colonel Vasily Popov (August/September 2023 – September 10, 2023), killed during the 2022 Russian invasion of Ukraine

== Distinguished soldiers ==
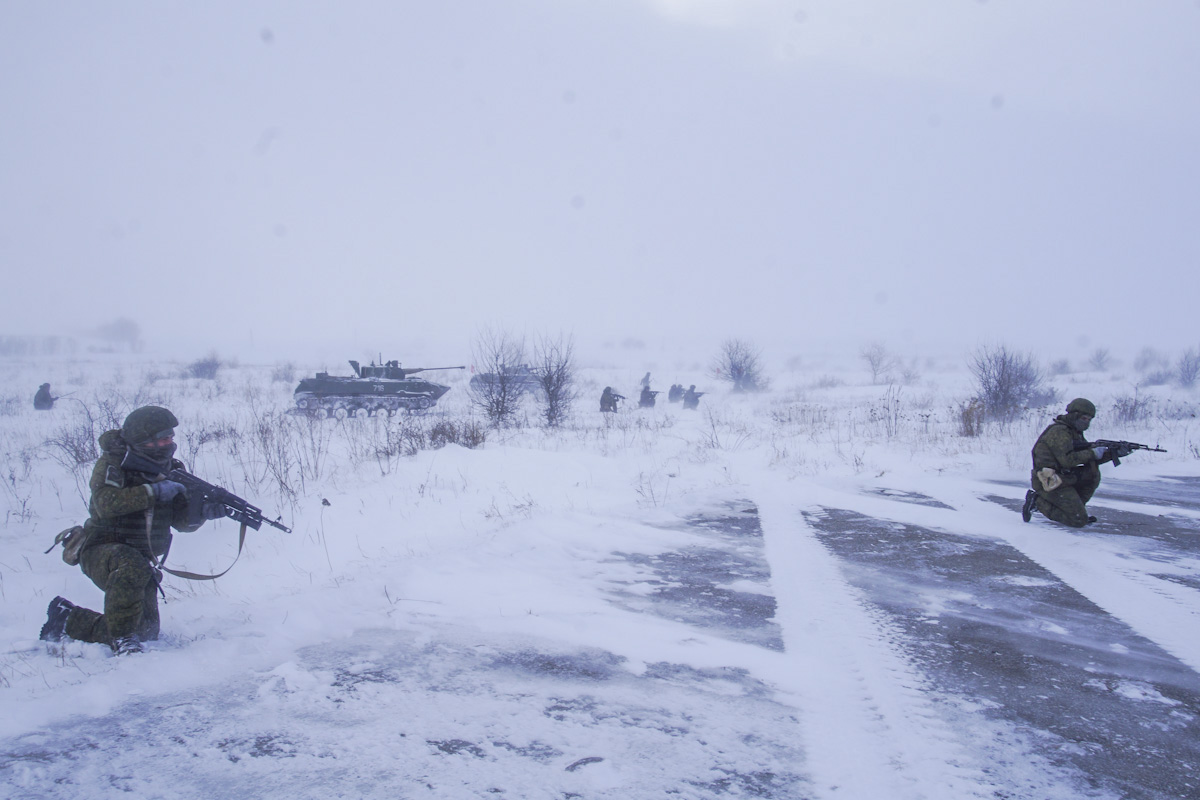
Tactical exercise of the 247th Guards Airborne Regiment on January 17, 2018.

Over 45 years, more than 2.5 thousand servicemen of the formation have been awarded orders and medals. Including the title Hero of the Russian Federation awarded to:

- Senior Lieutenant Vorozhanin, Oleg Viktorovich (posthumously);
- Lieutenant Dumchikov, Aleksandr Pavlovich;
- Captain Khomenko, Igor Vladimirovich (posthumously);
- Private Lancev, Mikhail Vasilyevich;
- Captain Lisitsky, Dmitry Mikhailovich;
- Captain Minenkov, Mikhail Anatolyevich;
- Colonel Nuzhny, Vasily Dmitrievich (posthumously);
- Captain Pegishev, Aleksandr Igorevich;
- Senior Sergeant Chumak, Yuri Alekseevich (posthumously);
- Colonel Em, Yuri Pavlovich;
- Senior Lieutenant Gadzimagomedov, Nurmagomed Engelsovich (posthumously);
- Senior Lieutenant Zorin, Denis Igorevich (posthumously);
- Colonel Sukuev, Vitaly Vladimirovich (posthumously);
- Lieutenant Skakunovsky, Denis Olegovich.

== Sources ==
- Feskov, V.I.; Golikov, V.I.; Kalashnikov, K.A.; Slugin, S.A. (2013). Вооруженные силы СССР после Второй Мировой войны: от Красной Армии к Советской [The Armed Forces of the USSR after World War II: From the Red Army to the Soviet: Part 1 Land Forces] (in Russian). Tomsk: Scientific and Technical Literature Publishing. ISBN 9785895035306.
- Seely, Robert (2001). Russo-Chechen Conflict, 1800-2000: A Deadly Embrace. New York: Frank Cass. ISBN 9780714649924.
