= Andrey Murga =

Russian politician

- Андрей Мурга
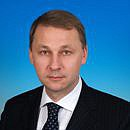

Deputy Chairman of the Government of Stavropol Krai
- In office 27 September 2013 – 19 March 2018

Member of the State Duma
- In office 21 September 2011 – 27 September 2013

Personal details
- Born: Andrey Yuryevich Murga; 7 October 1969; Stavropol, Soviet Union
- Political party: United Russia

Andrey Yuryevich Murga (Russian: Андрей Юрьевич Мурга; born 7 October 1969), is a Russian politician who had served as the Deputy Chairman of the Government of Stavropol Krai from 2013 to 2018. He also served as a member of the State Duma from 2011 to 2013.

On 7 June 2019, Murga was put on an international wanted list in over a fraud case. He is currently hiding from the investigation.

== Biography ==
Andrey Murga was born in Stavropol on 7 October 1969. He graduated from secondary school No. 23. From 1987 to 1991 he studied at the Stavropol Higher Aviation School of Pilots and Navigators. From 1991 to 1992, he served in the Soviet and then Russian Armed Forces. In 1992, after serving in the armed forces, he returned to Stavropol.

In 1993, Murga opened his own company Nord-Service. In 2000, he was trained under the presidential program “Preparation of personnel for the national economy” with a specialisation as “manager”. In December 2006, he defended his thesis on economics. In 2007, he was elected a member of the Duma of Stavropol Krai. On 4 March 2010, he became head of the Chamber of Commerce and Industry of Stavropol Krai.

In December 2011, Murga was elected a deputy of the State Duma, and was a member of the United Russia faction. He took office on 21 December.

In March 2012, at an extraordinary conference, members of the Chamber of Commerce and Industry of the Stavropol Krai, elected Deputy Minister of Economic Development Yevgeny Bondarenko as chairman, but Murga succeeded in taking legal action through the courts to reclaim the position on 25 August.

On 27 September 2013, Murga became the Deputy Chairman of the Government of the Stavropol Krai. He left office voluntarily on 19 March 2018. On 7 June 2019, he was put on an international wanted list in the fraud case, and is currently in hiding from the investigation.

== Family ==
Murga is married, and has four children. According to the newspaper Otkrytaya Gazeta, his wife runs the restaurant Veranda Italiana and the consulting company Eliseevskaya.
