= Ivan Popov (photographer) =

Yakut artist, ethnographer and photographer (1874–1945)

- Иван Попов
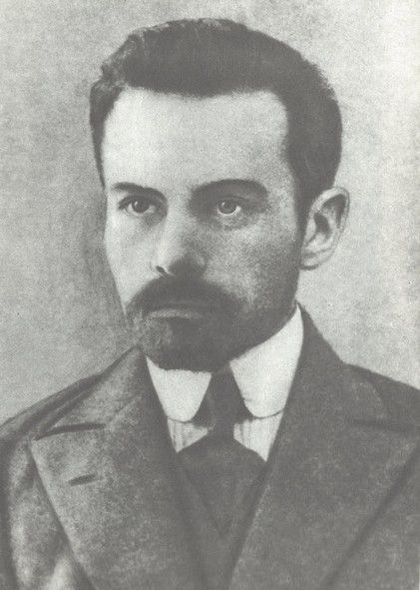
- Born: 1874; Ytyk-Kyuyol, Yakutsk Oblast, Russian Empire
- Died: 1945 (aged 70–71)
- Occupations: Artist; teacher; ethnographer; photographer; iconographer
- Children: 1

Ivan Vasilievich Popov (Russian: Иван Васильевич Попов; 1874–1945) was a Yakut and Soviet artist, teacher, ethnographic photographer and iconographer, often called the first professional Yakut painter by his contemporaries.

== Biography ==
Popov was born in 1874 in the selo of Ytyk-Kyuyol, Yakutsk Oblast (present-day Sakha Republic). His ancestors had arrived in Yakutia in the late 18th century from central Russian provinces. His grandfather, Archpriest Dimitrian Popov, was an influential figure in Yakutian Christianity who also collected local vocabulary that later aided the exiled linguist Eduard Pekarsky in compiling the first Yakut-Russian dictionary. After studying at the Yakutsk Theological Seminary, Popov trained in icon painting in St. Petersburg and later studied painting under Aleksandr Makovsky. He opened Yakutsk's first icon-painting and artistic workshop and painted the iconostasis of the Tattinsky Nikolaevskaya Church (1911–1912).

Between approximately 1910 and 1914, Popov conducted ethnographic expeditions across Yakutia and Buryatia for the ethnographic department of the Alexander III Museum (now the Russian Ethnographic Museum) and the Kunstkamera. There he photographed landscapes, everyday life, and local people in traditional dress; sketched household items; and collected silver, furs, pottery, toys, and shamanic costume elements. In 1914, he sent five crates containing 1,226 Yakut artifacts to ethnographic museums in Berlin, Hamburg, Leipzig, and Frankfurt. Using a compact German camera, he shot in black-and-white and printed postcards of Yakutian views through the Moscow firm Scherer, Nabholz & Co. In 1914, Popov ceased photographing and his later years remain poorly documented. Popov is also known to have recorded Yakut oral history and folklore.

During World War II Popov worked as a meteorologist and died in 1945, reportedly from exhaustion and malnutrition.

== Legacy ==
In 2024, on the 150th anniversary of his birth, an exhibition was held at the Art Museum of the Republic of Sakha in Yakutsk, where officials called him the "Yakut Leonardo." His life and expeditions inspired the 2024 Yakut film Don't Bury Me Without Ivan (Не хороните меня без Ивана). His son Ivan also became an artist.
