= 44 =

44 may refer to:

- 44 (number), the natural number following 43 and preceding 45
- one of the years 44 BC, AD 44, 1944, 2044

== Military ==
- 44M Tas, a Hungarian medium/heavy tank design of World War II
- 44M Tas Rohamlöveg, a Hungarian tank destroyer design of World War II, derived from the 44M Tas tank
- 44th Regiment of Foot a British Infantry Regiment(East Essex).

== Other uses ==
- "Forty-Four", a blues standard
- Forty-Fours, a group of islands in the Chatham Archipelago
- Forty Four, Arkansas, an unincorporated community in Izard County, Arkansas
- 44 (film), a 2026 Azerbaijani war drama film
- 44 (album), a 2020 quadruple album by Joel Plaskett
- "44", a song by Bad Gyal featuring Rema from Warm Up
- "Forty Four", a song by Karma to Burn from Appalachian Incantation
- .44 caliber, a family of firearms and firearm cartridges
  - .44 Special, a revolver cartridge
  - .44 Magnum, a large revolver cartridge evolved from the .44 special
- 44 Nysa, a main-belt asteroid
- DAF 44, a small family car
- The international calling code for United Kingdom
- Barack Obama, the 44th President of the United States

== See also ==
- 44th (disambiguation)
