= Ivan Nikolaevich Popov =

Russian politician (1878-?)

Ivan Popov Russian: Иван Попов
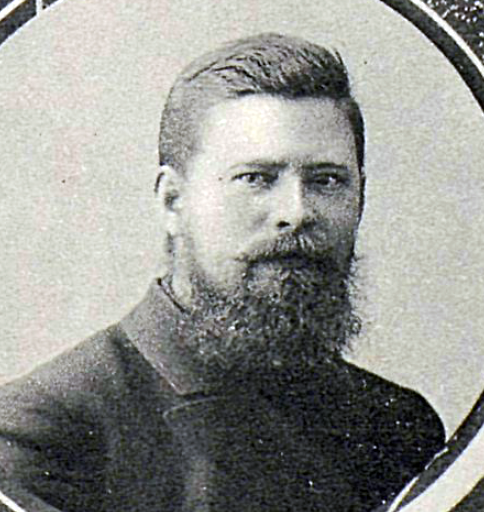
- photo of 1910

Deputy of the Third Imperial Duma
- In office 1 November 1907 – 9 June 1912
- Monarch: Nicholas II

Personal details
- Born: Ivan Nikolaevich Popov; 1878 Vologda Governorate, Russian Empire
- Died: after 1912
- Party: Moderate-right faction

Ivan Nikolaevich Popov (known in Duma as Popov 4th, Russian: Ива́н Никола́евич Попо́в; 1878, Nikolsky Uyezd, Vologda Governorate — after 1912) was a peasant, merchant and deputy of the Third Imperial Duma from the Vologda Governorate between 1907 and 1912. He was elected as non-partisan, but in Duma he adjoined the Moderate-right faction; later he left the faction and became non-partisan again. He was a member of the commercial and industrial commission, as well as the commission on resettlement (see Stolypin reform).

== Literature ==
- Попов Иван Николаевич (in Russian) // Государственная дума Российской империи: 1906—1917 / Б. Ю. Иванов, А. А. Комзолова, И. С. Ряховская. — Москва: РОССПЭН, 2008. — P. 483. — 735 p. — ISBN 978-5-8243-1031-3.
- Попов (in Russian) // Члены Государственной думы (портреты и биографии): Четвертый созыв, 1912—1917 г. / сост. М. М. Боиович. — Москва: Тип. Т-ва И. Д. Сытина, 1913. — P. 38. — LXIV, 454, [2] p.
