= Storozhevaya =

Storozhevaya Сторожевая
- Settlement
- Location within Perm Krai Location within Russia
- Coordinates: 60°26′N 57°18′E
- Country: Russia
- Region: Perm Krai
- District: Krasnovishersky District
- Time zone: UTC+5:00

Storozhevaya (Russian: Сторожевая) is a rural locality (a settlement) in Krasnovishersky District, Perm Krai, Russia. The population was 20 as of 2010.

== Geography ==
Storozhevaya is located 15 km northeast of Krasnovishersk (the district's administrative centre) by road. Visherogorsk is the nearest rural locality.
