= Shishigino =

Shishigino Шишигино
- Village
- Location within Perm Krai Location within Russia
- Coordinates: 60°12′N 56°09′E
- Country: Russia
- Region: Perm Krai
- District: Cherdynsky District
- Time zone: UTC+5:00

Shishigino (Russian: Шишигино) is a rural locality (a village) in Cherdynsky District, Perm Krai, Russia.

== Population ==
The population was 28 as of 2010. There are 3 streets.

== Geography ==
Shishigino is located 134 km southwest of Cherdyn (the district's administrative centre) by road. Pechinki is the nearest rural locality.
