= 44th Division =

44th Division may refer to:

== Infantry divisions ==
- 44th Reserve Division (German Empire)
- 44th Infantry Division (Wehrmacht), Germany, World War II
- 44th Infantry Division "Cremona", Kingdom of Italy
- 44th Division (Imperial Japanese Army)
- 44th Infantry Division (Poland)
- 44th Infantry Division (Russian Empire)
- 44th Guards Rifle Division, Soviet Union
- 44th Rifle Division, Soviet Union
- 44th Division (Spain)
- 44th (Home Counties) Division, United Kingdom
- 44th Infantry Division (United States)

== Airborne divisions ==
- 44th Airborne Division (PRC)
- 44th Airborne Division (India), British Indian Army, World War II
- 44th Air Assault Division, Russia
- 44th Training Airborne Division, Soviet Union

== Armoured divisions ==
- 44th Armoured Division (India)
- 44th Tank Training Division, Soviet Union

== Aviation divisions ==
- 44th Air Division, United States Air Force
- 44th Aviation Division, Yugoslav Air Force

== See also ==
- List of military divisions by number
- 44th Brigade (disambiguation)
- 44th Regiment (disambiguation)
- 44th Squadron (disambiguation)
