= 44th Brigade =

44th Brigade may refer to:

== India ==
- 44th (Ferozepore) Brigade in the First World War
- 44th Indian Infantry Brigade in the Second World War

== Soviet Union ==
- 44th Guards Cannon Artillery Brigade
- 44th Guards Tank Brigade

== Ukraine ==
- 44th Artillery Brigade (Ukraine)
- 44th Mechanized Brigade (Ukraine)

== United Kingdom ==
- 44th Anti-Aircraft Brigade (United Kingdom)
- 44th Infantry Brigade (United Kingdom)
- 44th Parachute Brigade (United Kingdom)
- 44th (Howitzer) Brigade Royal Field Artillery
- 44th (South African) Brigade, Royal Garrison Artillery in the First World War

== United States ==
- 44th Infantry Brigade Combat Team
- 44th Medical Brigade

== See also ==
- 44th Division (disambiguation)
- 44th Regiment (disambiguation)
- 44th Squadron (disambiguation)
