= 44 Squadron =

44 Squadron or 44th Squadron may refer to:

- No. 44 Squadron (Finland), a unit of the Finnish Air Force
- 44 Squadron SAAF, a unit of the South African Air Force
- No. 44 Squadron RAF, a unit of the United Kingdom Royal Air Force
- 44th Air Refueling Squadron (United States)
- 44th Bombardment Squadron (United States)
- 44th Fighter Squadron (United States)
- 44th Observation Squadron (United States)
- 44th Troop Carrier Squadron (United States)

== See also ==
- 44th Division (disambiguation)
- 44th Brigade (disambiguation)
