= 44th Regiment =

44th Regiment may refer to:

== British Army ==
- 44th (East Essex) Regiment of Foot
  - Essex Regiment, amalgamation of the 44th and the 56th (West Essex) Regiment of Foot
  - 3rd East Anglian Regiment (16th/44th Foot), formed from the Essex regiment
  - Royal Anglian Regiment formed from the 3rD East Anglian Regiment. The 3rd battalion is known as the "3rd (16th/44th Foot) Battalion"
- 44th Searchlight Regiment
- 44th Royal Tank Regiment

== British Indian Army ==
- 44th Merwara Infantry

== United States ==
- 44th Infantry Regiment (United States)
- 44th Air Defense Artillery Regiment

=== American Civil War regiments ===
==== Union ====
- 44th Illinois Volunteer Infantry Regiment
- 44th Indiana Infantry Regiment
- 44th Iowa Volunteer Infantry Regiment
- 44th New York Volunteer Infantry Regiment
- 44th Ohio Infantry
- 44th Wisconsin Volunteer Infantry Regiment
- 44th United States Colored Infantry

==== Confederate States ====
- 44th Alabama Infantry Regiment
- 44th Arkansas Infantry (Mounted)
- 44th Georgia Volunteer Infantry
- 44th North Carolina Infantry
- 44th Tennessee Infantry Regiment
- 44th Virginia Infantry

== South Africa ==
- 44 Parachute Regiment (South Africa)
- 44 Parachute Anti-Aircraft Regiment

== See also ==
- 44th Brigade (disambiguation)
- 44th Division (disambiguation)
