= 44th Air Assault Division =

Russian Airborne Troops formation

- Russian: 44-я десантно-штурмовая дивизия
- Active: 2023–present
- Country: Russia
- Branch: Russian Airborne Forces
- Engagements: Russo-Ukrainian War; Southern Ukraine offensive

The 44th Air Assault Division (Russian: 44-я десантно-штурмовая дивизия) is a Russian Airborne Forces air assault division formed in 2023.

== History ==
The 44th Air Assault Division was speculated to be one of the two new airborne divisions announced by the Russian defense minister Sergey Shoigu in September 2023. The 44th had previously been the 44th Training Airborne Division of the Soviet Airborne Forces, which in 1987 was made into the modern day 242nd Training Center of the Russian Airborne Forces.

Unlike the 104th, which was formed on the basis of the existing 31st Guards Air Assault Brigade, the 44th Division was put together from two Donetsk People's Republic motorized infantry regiments – the 111th and the 387th Motor Rifle Regiments. Both had been formed from mobilized reservists, and so the 44th Air Assault Division was described by one analyst as air assault "in name only and not in function," being more comparable to a reserve or territorial division. However, it did receive some officers who were graduates of the Ryazan Guards Higher Airborne Command School.
