= 36th Cavalry =

36th Cavalry may refer to:

- 36th Cavalry Division, Soviet Union
- 36th Jacob's Horse, British India
- 36th Texas Cavalry Regiment, Confederate States Army
- 36th Virginia Cavalry Battalion, Confederate States Army

== See also ==
- 36th Division (disambiguation)
- 36th Brigade (disambiguation)
- 36th Regiment (disambiguation)
- 36th (disambiguation)
