= 36th Army =

36th Army may refer to:

- Thirty-Sixth Army (Japan)
- 36th Guards Combined Arms Army, Russia
- 36th Army (Soviet Union)

== See also ==
- List of armies by number
- XXXVI Corps (disambiguation)
- 36th Division (disambiguation)
- 36th Brigade (disambiguation)
- 36th Regiment (disambiguation)
- 36th Battalion (disambiguation)
- 36th Squadron (disambiguation)
- 36th (disambiguation)
