= XXXVI Corps =

36 Corps, 36th Corps, Thirty Sixth Corps, or XXXVI Corps may refer to:

== United Kingdom ==
- 36th (Paddington Rifles) Middlesex Rifle Volunteer Corps
- 36th Staffordshire Rifle Volunteer Corps
- 36th (Rotherham) Yorkshire West Riding Rifle Volunteer Corps

== Other countries ==
- 36th Army Corps (France)
- XXXVI Mountain Corps, Wehrmacht, Germany
- 36th Army Corps (Russian Empire)
- XXXVI Corps (United States)

== See also ==
- List of military corps by number
- 36th Army (disambiguation)
- 36th Battalion (disambiguation)
- 36th Brigade (disambiguation)
- 36th Division (disambiguation)
- 36th Regiment (disambiguation)
- 36th Squadron (disambiguation)
- 36th (disambiguation)
