= 36th =

36th is the ordinal form of the number 36. 36th or Thirty-sixth may also refer to:

- A fraction, 1/36, equal to one of 36 equal parts

== Geography ==
- 36th meridian east, a line of longitude
- 36th meridian west, a line of longitude
- 36th parallel north, a circle of latitude
- 36th parallel south, a circle of latitude
- 36th Street (disambiguation)

== Military ==
- 36th Army (disambiguation)
- 36th Battalion (disambiguation)
- 36th Brigade (disambiguation)
- 36th Division (disambiguation)
- 36th Regiment (disambiguation)
- 36th Squadron (disambiguation)

== Other ==
- Thirty-sixth Amendment
- 36th century
- 36th century BC

== See also ==
- 36 (disambiguation)
