= 36 =

36 may refer to:

- 36 (number), the natural number following 35 and preceding 37
- 36 BC
- AD 36
- 1936
- 2036
- Hungary's international calling code

== Science ==
- Krypton, a noble gas in the periodic table
- 36 Atalante, an asteroid in the asteroid belt

== Arts and entertainment ==
- 36 (TV series), an American sports documentary show
- "36", a 2002 song by System of a Down from Steal This Album!
- 36 Quai des Orfèvres (film), a 2004 French crime film
- "Thirty Six", a song by Karma to Burn from the album Almost Heathen, 2001

== See also ==
- 36th (disambiguation)
