= 36th Division =

36th Division or 36th Infantry Division may refer to:

== Infantry divisions ==
- 36th Division (German Empire)
- 36th Reserve Division, German Empire
- 36th Infantry Division (Wehrmacht)
- 36th Waffen Grenadier Division of the SS, Germany
- 36th Infantry Division "Forlì", Italy
- 36th Division (Imperial Japanese Army)
- 36th Infantry Division (Poland)
- 36th Infantry Division (Russian Empire)
- 36th Infantry Division (South Korea)
- 36th Guards Motor Rifle Division, Soviet Union, earlier the 36th Guards Mechanized Division
- 36th Motor Rifle Division, Soviet Union
- 36th Rifle Division, Soviet Union
- 36th Guards Rifle Division, Soviet Union
- 36th Division (Spain)
- 36th (Ulster) Division, British Army, World War I
- 36th Infantry Division (United Kingdom), World War II
- 36th Infantry Division (United States)
- 36th Division (Yugoslav Partisans)

== Cavalry divisions ==
- 36th Division (National Revolutionary Army), Republic of China
- 36th Cavalry Division, Soviet Union

== Armoured divisions ==
- 36th Division (Israel)
- 36th Tank Division (Soviet Union), with 17th Mechanized Corps, June 1941

== Aviation divisions ==
- 36th Bomber Division, People's Republic of China
- 36th Bomber Aviation Division, Soviet Union
- 36th Air Division, United States

== See also ==
- List of military divisions by number
- 36th Army (disambiguation)
- XXXVI Corps (disambiguation)
- 36th Brigade (disambiguation)
- 36th Regiment (disambiguation)
- 36th Battalion (disambiguation)
- 36th Squadron (disambiguation)
