= 36th Motor Rifle Division =

Motor rifle division of the Soviet military

- Active: 1966–1990
- Country: Soviet Union
- Branch: Soviet Army
- Type: Motorized infantry
- Garrison/HQ: Artemivsk

The 36th Motor Rifle Division was a motorized infantry division of the Soviet Army between 1966 and 1990. Based in Artemivsk, it was absorbed by the 254th Motor Rifle Division in 1990.

== History ==
The division was activated on 20 June 1966 in Artemivsk, Donetsk Oblast, part of the Kiev Military District. In 1972, the division's Chemical Defence Company was renamed the 19th Separate Chemical Defence Battalion. In April 1982, the division became part of the 64th Army Corps. In July 1989, the corps was disbanded and the 36th became part of the Kiev Military District again. During the Cold War, the division was maintained at 15% strength. In January 1990, the division was disbanded and was absorbed by the 254th Motor Rifle Division, arriving from Hungary.

== Composition ==
The division included the following units in 1988.

- 103rd Motor Rifle Regiment
- 142nd Motor Rifle Regiment
- 143rd Motor Rifle Regiment
- 35th Tank Regiment
- Artillery Regiment
- Anti-Aircraft Missile Regiment
- Separate Missile Battalion
- Separate Anti-Tank Artillery Battalion
- Separate Reconnaissance Battalion
- Separate Engineer-Sapper Battalion
- 1179th Separate Communications Battalion
- 19th Separate Chemical Defence Battalion
- Separate Equipment Maintenance and Recovery Battalion
- 199th Separate Medical Company
- Separate Material Supply Battalion
