= New York British Volunteers =

The New York British Volunteers was a short-lived regiment in the Union Army during the American Civil War. The unit began recruiting in New York City shortly after the outbreak of the war, and managed to draw several hundred recruits. The regiment was staffed by former members of the British Army, many of whom were veterans of the Crimean War. In a hurry to field as many units as possible, the State of New York transferred the men of the New York British Volunteers to another understrength regiment, the Washington Volunteers. This new formation was designated the 36th New York Infantry. A number of the former officers of New York British Volunteers subsequently resigned, while a number of the rank and file are reported to have deserted.

== See also ==
- List of New York Civil War units
- New York Volunteers
