= 36th Battalion =

36th Battalion or 36th Infantry Battalion may refer to:

- 36th Battalion (Australia): an Australian infantry battalion that served during World War I and after;
- 36th Battalion, CEF: a Canadian infantry battalion that served during World War I;
- 36th Battalion (New Zealand): a New Zealand infantry battalion that served during World War II;
- 36th Virginia Cavalry Battalion: a unit of the Confederate States Army during the American Civil War;
- Iraqi 36th Commando Battalion: a current Iraqi Army unit;
- 36th Battalion, Northumberland Fusiliers: a British Army unit;
- 36th Peel Battalion: a Canadian infantry regiment that existed 1866–1936.

== See also ==
- 36th Division (disambiguation)
- 36th Brigade (disambiguation)
- 36th Regiment (disambiguation)
- 36th Squadron (disambiguation)
