= Leap year starting on Tuesday =

A leap year starting on Tuesday is any year with 366 days (i.e. it includes 29 February) that begins on Tuesday, 1 January, and ends on Wednesday, 31 December. Its dominical letters hence are FE. The most recent year of such kind was 2008, and the next one will be 2036 in the Gregorian calendar or, likewise 2020 and 2048 in the obsolete Julian calendar.

Any leap year that starts on Tuesday has only one Friday the 13th; the only one in this leap year occurs in June. Common years starting on Wednesday share this characteristic.

== Calendars ==
Calendar for any leap year starting on Tuesday,
presented as common in many English-speaking areas

	January
Su	Mo	Tu	We	Th	Fr	Sa
		1	2	3	4	5
6	7	8	9	10	11	12
13	14	15	16	17	18	19
20	21	22	23	24	25	26
27	28	29	30	31

	February
Su	Mo	Tu	We	Th	Fr	Sa
					1	2
3	4	5	6	7	8	9
10	11	12	13	14	15	16
17	18	19	20	21	22	23
24	25	26	27	28	29

	March
Su	Mo	Tu	We	Th	Fr	Sa
						1
2	3	4	5	6	7	8
9	10	11	12	13	14	15
16	17	18	19	20	21	22
23	24	25	26	27	28	29
30	31

	April
Su	Mo	Tu	We	Th	Fr	Sa
		1	2	3	4	5
6	7	8	9	10	11	12
13	14	15	16	17	18	19
20	21	22	23	24	25	26
27	28	29	30

	May
Su	Mo	Tu	We	Th	Fr	Sa
				1	2	3
4	5	6	7	8	9	10
11	12	13	14	15	16	17
18	19	20	21	22	23	24
25	26	27	28	29	30	31

	June
Su	Mo	Tu	We	Th	Fr	Sa
1	2	3	4	5	6	7
8	9	10	11	12	13	14
15	16	17	18	19	20	21
22	23	24	25	26	27	28
29	30

	July
Su	Mo	Tu	We	Th	Fr	Sa
		1	2	3	4	5
6	7	8	9	10	11	12
13	14	15	16	17	18	19
20	21	22	23	24	25	26
27	28	29	30	31

	August
Su	Mo	Tu	We	Th	Fr	Sa
					1	2
3	4	5	6	7	8	9
10	11	12	13	14	15	16
17	18	19	20	21	22	23
24	25	26	27	28	29	30
31

	September
Su	Mo	Tu	We	Th	Fr	Sa
	1	2	3	4	5	6
7	8	9	10	11	12	13
14	15	16	17	18	19	20
21	22	23	24	25	26	27
28	29	30

	October
Su	Mo	Tu	We	Th	Fr	Sa
			1	2	3	4
5	6	7	8	9	10	11
12	13	14	15	16	17	18
19	20	21	22	23	24	25
26	27	28	29	30	31

	November
Su	Mo	Tu	We	Th	Fr	Sa
						1
2	3	4	5	6	7	8
9	10	11	12	13	14	15
16	17	18	19	20	21	22
23	24	25	26	27	28	29
30

	December
Su	Mo	Tu	We	Th	Fr	Sa
	1	2	3	4	5	6
7	8	9	10	11	12	13
14	15	16	17	18	19	20
21	22	23	24	25	26	27
28	29	30	31

ISO 8601-conformant calendar with week numbers for
any leap year starting on Tuesday (dominical letter FE)

	January
Wk	Mo	Tu	We	Th	Fr	Sa	Su
01		01	02	03	04	05	06
02	07	08	09	10	11	12	13
03	14	15	16	17	18	19	20
04	21	22	23	24	25	26	27
05	28	29	30	31

	February
Wk	Mo	Tu	We	Th	Fr	Sa	Su
05					01	02	03
06	04	05	06	07	08	09	10
07	11	12	13	14	15	16	17
08	18	19	20	21	22	23	24
09	25	26	27	28	29

	March
Wk	Mo	Tu	We	Th	Fr	Sa	Su
09						01	02
10	03	04	05	06	07	08	09
11	10	11	12	13	14	15	16
12	17	18	19	20	21	22	23
13	24	25	26	27	28	29	30
14	31

	April
Wk	Mo	Tu	We	Th	Fr	Sa	Su
14		01	02	03	04	05	06
15	07	08	09	10	11	12	13
16	14	15	16	17	18	19	20
17	21	22	23	24	25	26	27
18	28	29	30

	May
Wk	Mo	Tu	We	Th	Fr	Sa	Su
18				01	02	03	04
19	05	06	07	08	09	10	11
20	12	13	14	15	16	17	18
21	19	20	21	22	23	24	25
22	26	27	28	29	30	31

	June
Wk	Mo	Tu	We	Th	Fr	Sa	Su
22							01
23	02	03	04	05	06	07	08
24	09	10	11	12	13	14	15
25	16	17	18	19	20	21	22
26	23	24	25	26	27	28	29
27	30

	July
Wk	Mo	Tu	We	Th	Fr	Sa	Su
27		01	02	03	04	05	06
28	07	08	09	10	11	12	13
29	14	15	16	17	18	19	20
30	21	22	23	24	25	26	27
31	28	29	30	31

	August
Wk	Mo	Tu	We	Th	Fr	Sa	Su
31					01	02	03
32	04	05	06	07	08	09	10
33	11	12	13	14	15	16	17
34	18	19	20	21	22	23	24
35	25	26	27	28	29	30	31

	September
Wk	Mo	Tu	We	Th	Fr	Sa	Su
36	01	02	03	04	05	06	07
37	08	09	10	11	12	13	14
38	15	16	17	18	19	20	21
39	22	23	24	25	26	27	28
40	29	30

	October
Wk	Mo	Tu	We	Th	Fr	Sa	Su
40			01	02	03	04	05
41	06	07	08	09	10	11	12
42	13	14	15	16	17	18	19
43	20	21	22	23	24	25	26
44	27	28	29	30	31

	November
Wk	Mo	Tu	We	Th	Fr	Sa	Su
44						01	02
45	03	04	05	06	07	08	09
46	10	11	12	13	14	15	16
47	17	18	19	20	21	22	23
48	24	25	26	27	28	29	30

	December
Wk	Mo	Tu	We	Th	Fr	Sa	Su
49	01	02	03	04	05	06	07
50	08	09	10	11	12	13	14
51	15	16	17	18	19	20	21
52	22	23	24	25	26	27	28
01	29	30	31

== Applicable years ==
=== Gregorian Calendar ===
Leap years that begin on Tuesday, along with those starting on Wednesday, occur at a rate of approximately 14.43% (14 out of 97) of all total leap years in a 400-year cycle of the Gregorian calendar. Thus, their overall occurrence is 3.5% (14 out of 400).

Gregorian leap years starting on Tuesday
Decade	1st	2nd	3rd	4th	5th	6th	7th	8th	9th	10th
17th century	1608			1636			1664			1692
18th century	1704			1732			1760		1788	
19th century			1828			1856			1884	
20th century			1924			1952			1980	
21st century	2008			2036			2064			2092
22nd century	2104			2132			2160		2188	
23rd century			2228			2256			2284	
24th century			2324			2352			2380	
25th century	2408			2436			2464			2492
26th century	2504			2532		2560			2588	

400-year cycle
0–99	8	36	64	92
100–199	104	132	160	188
200–299	228	256	284	
300–399	324	352	380	

=== Julian Calendar ===
Like all leap year types, the one starting with 1 January on a Tuesday occurs exactly once in a 28-year cycle in the Julian calendar, i.e. in 3.57% of years. As the Julian calendar repeats after 28 years that means it will also repeat after 700 years, i.e. 25 cycles. The year's position in the cycle is given by the formula ((year + 8) mod 28) + 1).

Julian leap years starting on Tuesday
Decade	1st	2nd	3rd	4th	5th	6th	7th	8th	9th	10th
14th century	1320			1348		1376				
15th century	1404			1432		1460			1488	
16th century		1516			1544			1572		1600
17th century			1628			1656			1684	
18th century		1712		1740			1768			1796
19th century			1824			1852		1880		
20th century	1908			1936			1964			1992
21st century		2020			2048			2076		
22nd century	2104			2132		2160			2188	

== Holidays ==
=== International ===
- Valentine's Day falls on a Thursday
- The leap day (February 29) falls on a Friday
- World Day for Grandparents and the Elderly falls on July 27
- Halloween falls on a Friday
- Christmas Day falls on a Thursday

=== Roman Catholic Solemnities ===
- Epiphany falls on a Sunday
- Candlemas falls on a Saturday
- Saint Joseph's Day falls on a Wednesday
- The Annunciation of Jesus falls on a Tuesday
- The Nativity of John the Baptist falls on a Tuesday
- The Solemnity of Saints Peter and Paul falls on a Sunday
- The Transfiguration of Jesus falls on a Wednesday
- The Assumption of Mary falls on a Friday
- The Exaltation of the Holy Cross falls on a Sunday
- All Saints' Day falls on a Saturday
- All Souls' Day falls on a Sunday
- The Feast of Christ the King falls on November 23 (or on October 26 in versions of the calendar between 1925 and 1962)
- The First Sunday of Advent falls on November 30
- The Immaculate Conception falls on a Monday
- Gaudete Sunday falls on December 14
- Rorate Sunday falls on December 21

=== Australia and New Zealand ===
- Australia Day falls on a Saturday
- Waitangi Day falls on a Wednesday
- Daylight saving ends on April 6
- ANZAC Day falls on a Friday
- Mother's Day falls on May 11
- Father's Day falls on its latest possible date, September 7
- Daylight saving begins on September 28 in New Zealand and October 5 in Australia

=== British Isles ===
- Saint David's Day falls on a Saturday
- Mother's Day falls on March 2, March 9, March 16, March 23 or March 30
- Saint Patrick's Day falls on a Monday
- Daylight saving begins on March 30
- Saint George's Day falls on a Wednesday
- Father's Day falls on its earliest possible date, June 15
- Orangeman's Day falls on a Saturday
- Daylight saving ends on October 26
- Guy Fawkes Night falls on a Wednesday
- Saint Andrew's Day falls on a Sunday

=== Canada ===
- Daylight saving begins on March 9
- Mother's Day falls on May 11
- Victoria Day falls on May 19
- Father's Day falls on its earliest possible date, June 15
- Canada Day falls on a Tuesday
- Labour Day falls on its earliest possible date, September 1
- Thanksgiving Day falls on October 13
- Daylight saving ends on November 2

=== Denmark ===
- The Constitution Day falls on a Thursday

=== Germany ===
- The reunification falls on a Friday

=== United States ===
- Martin Luther King Jr. Day falls on its latest possible date, January 21. This is the only type of leap year where Columbus Day and Martin Luther King Jr. Day are 15 weeks apart. They are 14 weeks apart in all other leap years. This is also the only type of leap year where Thanksgiving and Martin Luther King Jr. Day are 60 days apart. They are 53 days apart in all other leap years
- President's Day falls on February 18
- Daylight saving begins on March 9
- Mother's Day falls on May 11
- Memorial Day falls on May 26
- Father's Day falls on its earliest possible date, June 15. This is the only type of leap year where Martin Luther King Jr. Day and Father’s Day are 146 days apart. They are 153 days apart in all other leap years
- Juneteenth falls on a Thursday
- Independence Day falls on a Friday
- Labor Day falls on its earliest possible date, September 1. This is the only type of leap year where Martin Luther King Jr. Day and Labor Day are 32 weeks apart. They are 33 weeks apart in all other leap years
- Grandparents' Day falls on its earliest possible date, September 7. This is the only type of leap year where Martin Luther King Jr. Day and Grandparent’s Day are 230 days apart. They are 237 days apart in all other leap years.
- Columbus Day falls on October 13
- Daylight saving ends on November 2
- Election Day falls on November 4
- Thanksgiving Day falls on November 27
