= 36th Brigade =

36th Brigade or 36th Infantry Brigade may refer to:

== Canada ==
- 36 Canadian Brigade Group of the Canadian Army

== India ==
- 36th Indian Brigade of the British Indian Army in the First World War
- 36th Indian Infantry Brigade of the British Indian Army in the Second World War

== Italy ==
- 36th Air Brigade (Italy)

== Kazakhstan ==
- 36th Air Assault Brigade (Kazakhstan)

== Russia ==
- 36th Separate Air Assault Brigade
- 36th Separate Guards Motor Rifle Brigade

== Soviet Union ==
- 36th Separate Air Assault Brigade

== Ukraine ==
- 36th Marine Brigade of the Ukrainian Naval Infantry
- 36th Road Restoration Brigade (Ukraine)
- 36th Separate Coastal Defense Brigade

== United Kingdom ==
- 36th Infantry Brigade (United Kingdom)
- 36th (Scottish) Anti-Aircraft Brigade
- 36th Tank Brigade (United Kingdom)
- 36th Brigade Royal Field Artillery

== United States ==
- 36th Airborne Brigade (United States)
- 36th Combat Aviation Brigade
- 36th Division Sustainment Brigade
- 36th Engineer Brigade (United States)

== See also ==
- XXXVI Corps (disambiguation)
- 36th Division (disambiguation)
- 36th Regiment (disambiguation)
- 36th Battalion (disambiguation)
- 36 Squadron (disambiguation)
