= 36 Signal Regiment =

36 Signal Regiment may refer to:

- 36 (Eastern) Signal Regiment, of the British Territorial Army
- 36 Signal Regiment (Canada), of the Canadian Forces Primary Reserve
