= 2036 =

Calendar year

2036 in various calendars
- Gregorian calendar: 2036; MMXXXVI
- Ab urbe condita: 2789
- Armenian calendar: 1485; ԹՎ ՌՆՁԵ
- Assyrian calendar: 6786
- Baháʼí calendar: 192–193
- Balinese saka calendar: 1957–1958
- Bengali calendar: 1442–1443
- Berber calendar: 2986
- British Regnal year: N/A
- Buddhist calendar: 2580
- Burmese calendar: 1398
- Byzantine calendar: 7544–7545
- Chinese calendar: 乙卯年 (Wood Rabbit); 4733 or 4526 — to — 丙辰年 (Fire Dragon); 4734 or 4527
- Coptic calendar: 1752–1753
- Discordian calendar: 3202
- Ethiopian calendar: 2028–2029
- Hebrew calendar: 5796–5797
- Hindu calendars
- Vikram Samvat: 2092–2093
- Shaka Samvat: 1957–1958
- Kali Yuga: 5136–5137
- Holocene calendar: 12036
- Igbo calendar: 1036–1037
- Iranian calendar: 1414–1415
- Islamic calendar: 1457–1458
- Japanese calendar: Reiwa 18 (令和１８年)
- Javanese calendar: 1969–1970
- Juche calendar: 125
- Julian calendar: Gregorian minus 13 days
- Korean calendar: 4369
- Minguo calendar: ROC 125 民國125年
- Nanakshahi calendar: 568
- Thai solar calendar: 2579
- Tibetan calendar: ཤིང་མོ་ཡོས་ལོ་ (female Wood-Hare); 2162 or 1781 or 1009 — to — མེ་ཕོ་འབྲུག་ལོ་ (male Fire-Dragon); 2163 or 1782 or 1010
- Unix time: 2082758400 – 2114380799

2036 (MMXXXVI) will be a leap year starting on Tuesday of the Gregorian calendar, the 2036th year of the Common Era (CE) and Anno Domini (AD) designations, the 36th year of the 3rd millennium and the 21st century, and the 7th year of the 2030s decade.

== Predicted and scheduled events ==
=== June ===
- June 15 – Arkansas will celebrate 200 years of statehood.

=== Date unknown ===
- The United States military's lease on the island of Diego Garcia, part of the British Indian Ocean Territory, will expire if it is not renewed.
- The 2036 Summer Olympics will be held.
- One of the METI messages Cosmic Call 2 sent from the 70-meter Eupatoria Planetary Radar in 2003 arrives at its destination, the Gliese 49 system.
