= 36th Separate Air Assault Brigade =

36th Air Assault Brigade (Oct 1979 – 1 Jun 1990) 36th Airborne Brigade
- Active: 1979–1996
- Country: Soviet Union (1979–1992); Russia (1992–1997)
- Branch: Soviet Army (1979–1990) Soviet airborne (1990–1992) Russian Airborne Troops (1992–1997)
- Type: Airborne
- Size: Brigade
- Garrison/HQ: Garbolovo

The 36th Airborne Brigade was an airborne brigade of the Russian Airborne Troops, disbanded in 1997. It was originally formed in 1979 as the 36th Separate Air Assault Brigade.

== History ==
The 36th Separate Air Assault Brigade was formed in October 1979 in Garbolovo, Leningrad Oblast (Leningrad Military District). It was composed of three airborne battalions, an air assault battalion, an artillery battalion and an antiaircraft artillery battalion. On 1 June 1990, the brigade was transferred to the Soviet Airborne Troops and was renamed the 36th Separate Airborne Brigade after its air assault battalion was disbanded. On 24 September 1996, it was ordered that the brigade be disbanded. The process was completed on 1 February 1997.
