= 36th Intelligence Squadron =

36th Intelligence Squadron
- Active: 1942–1946; 1990-Present
- Country: United States
- Branch: United States Air Force
- Engagements: Southwest Pacific Theater
- Decorations: Air Force Meritorious Unit Award; Air Force Outstanding Unit Award with Combat "V" Device; Air Force Outstanding Unit Award; Air Force Organizational Excellence Award; Philippine Presidential Unit Citation

Insignia
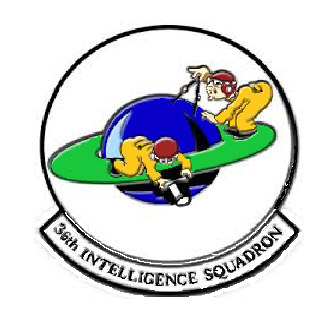
- 36th Intelligence Squadron emblem

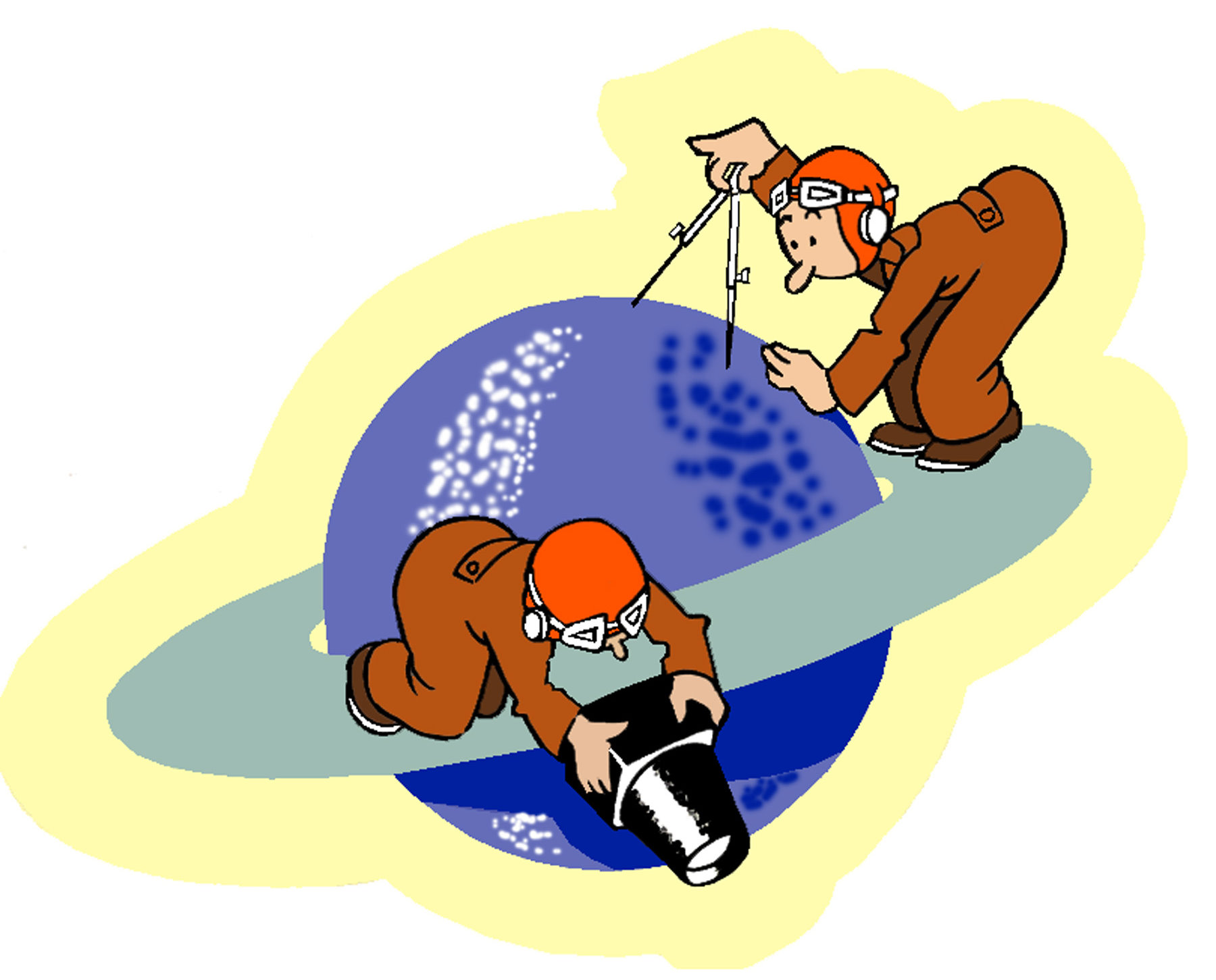
- 36th Photographic Mapping Squadron emblem (approved 7 March 1944)

The 36th Intelligence Squadron is an active non-flying squadron, of the United States Air Force. It is assigned to the Air Force Targeting Center at Langley Air Force Base, Virginia, where it has been stationed since 1990. The squadron has earned the Air Force Meritorious Unit Award, the Air Force Outstanding Unit Award, and the Air Force Organizational Excellence Award while stationed at Langley.

During World War II the squadron served in the Pacific as the 36th Photographic Reconnaissance Squadron The squadron earned the Philippine Presidential Unit Citation for its combat operations during the Liberation of the Philippines in 1944–1945.

== History ==
=== World War II ===
The squadron was first activated in the summer of 1942 as the 28th Observation Squadron, one of the squadrons of the 73d Observation Group at Godman Field, Kentucky, where it was equipped with the Bell P-39 Airacobra. The squadron engaged in training activities including the Tennessee maneuvers of 1943.

During World War II, the squadron operated primarily in the Southwest Pacific Theater, providing aerial reconnaissance and intelligence information over a wide area of the theater in numerous campaigns. In 1945, it performed reconnaissance missions over Formosa as well as the Philippines. The squadron earned the Philippine Presidential Unit Citation for its combat operations during the Liberation of the Philippines in 1944–1945. Following the Japanese surrender the squadron moved to Japan, briefly serving as part of the occupation forces, but returned to the Philippines at the end of 1945 and was inactivated in 1946.

=== Intelligence ===
The squadron was reactivated as an intelligence unit supporting Tactical Air Command (TAC) in 1990. When Air Combat Command replaced TAC in 1992, the 36th was transferred along with its parent group. In February 2008, it was reassigned to the Air Combat Command Targeting and Intelligence Group. Although much of its history remains classified, it has won numerous awards for its performance.

== Lineage ==
- Constituted as the 28th Observation Squadron on 1 July 1942

Activated on 17 July 1942
Redesignated: 28th Reconnaissance Squadron (Fighter) on 2 April 1943
Redesignated: 28th Tactical Reconnaissance Squadron on 11 August 1943
Redesignated: 36th Photographic Mapping Squadron on 9 October 1943
Redesignated: 36th Photographic Reconnaissance Squadron on 29 March 1944
Inactivated on 20 February 1946

- Redesignated 36th Tactical Intelligence Squadron and activated on 1 September 1990

Redesignated 36th Air Intelligence Squadron on 1 November 1991
Redesignated 36th Intelligence Squadron on 1 October 1993

=== Assignments ===
- 73d Observation (later Reconnaissance; Tactical Reconnaissance) Group, 17 July 1942
- 76th Tactical Reconnaissance Group, 9 October 1943 (attached to 73d Tactical Reconnaissance Group)
- 74th Tactical Reconnaissance Group, 21 October 1943 (attached to 73d Tactical Reconnaissance Group to 3 November 1943)
- I (later III) Tactical Air Division, 29 March 1944
- Far East Air Forces, November 1944
- Thirteenth Air Force, 2 December 1944
- Fifth Air Force, 7 December 1944
- 6th Photographic (later Reconnaissance) Group, 23 December 1944
- Seventh Air Force, 20 October 1945
- V Fighter Command, 29 November 1945
- Far East Air Forces (later Pacific Air Command, US Army), 3 December 1945 – 20 February 1946
- 480th Tactical Intelligence Group (later 480th Air Intelligence Group, 480th Intelligence Group), 1 September 1990
- Air Combat Command Targeting and Intelligence Group (later Air Force Targeting Center), 2 June 2008 – present

=== Stations ===
- Godman Field, Kentucky, 17 July 1942
- Camp Campbell Army Airfield, Kentucky, 25 June 1943
- Muskogee Army Air Field Oklahoma, to April-31 October 1944
- Hollandia Airfield Complex, Netherlands East Indies, 15 December 1944
- Mokmer Airfield, Biak, Netherlands East Indies, 26 December 1944
- Clark Field, Luzon, Philippines, c. 28 April – 26 July 1945
- Motobu Airfield, Okinawa, 4 August 1945 (air echelon remained at Clark Field to September 1945)
- Chofu Airport, Japan, October 1945
- Fort William McKinley, Luzon, Philippines, December 1945 – 20 February 1946
- Langley AFB, Virginia, 1 September 1990 – Present

=== Aircraft ===
Attack and Bomber Aircraft

- Douglas A-20 Havoc and DB-7, 1942–1944
- Lockheed A-29 Hudson during period 1942 – 1944
- North American B-25 Mitchell, 1943–1944
- Lockheed B-34 Ventura, during period 1942 – 1944

Fighter Aircraft

- Lockheed P-38 Lightning (F-5), 1944, 1945.
- Bell P-39 Airacobra: 1942–1943, 1943, 1943–1944
- Republic P-43 Lancer during period 1942 – 1944
- North American P-51 Mustang during period 1942 – 1944

Observation and Liaison Aircraft

- Stinson L-1 Vigilant, during period 1942 – 1944
- Taylorcraft L-2, during period 1942 – 1944
- Piper L-4 Cub, during period 1942 – 1944
- North American O-47, during period 1942 – 1944
- Curtiss O-52 Owl, during period 1942 – 1944

=== Awards and campaigns ===
Award streamer	Award	Dates	Notes
	Air Force Meritorious Unit Award	1 June 2004 – 31 May 2006	36th Intelligence Squadron
	Air Force Meritorious Unit Award	1 June 2006 – 31 May 2007	36th Intelligence Squadron
	Air Force Outstanding Unit Award w/Combat "V" Device	1 June 2002 – 31 May 2003	36th Intelligence Squadron
	Air Force Outstanding Unit Award	1 September 1990 – 31 December 1991	36th Tactical Intelligence Squadron (later 36th Air Intelligence Squadron)
	Air Force Outstanding Unit Award	1 January 1992 – 30 September 1993	36th Air Intelligence Squadron
	Air Force Organizational Excellence Award	1 October 1993 – 30 September 1995	36th Intelligence Squadron
	Philippine Republic Presidential Unit Citation	17 October 1944 – 4 July 1945	36th Photographic Reconnaissance Squadron

Manual campaign table

Campaign Streamer	Campaign	Dates	Notes
	American Theater		28th Observation Squadron (later 36th Photographic Mapping Squadron)
	New Guinea		36th Photographic Reconnaissance Squadron
	Western Pacific		36th Photographic Reconnaissance Squadron
	Luzon		36th Photographic Reconnaissance Squadron
	Southern Philippines		36th Photographic Reconnaissance Squadron
	China Offensive		36th Photographic Reconnaissance Squadron
