= 36th New York Infantry Regiment =

- Active: June 17, 1861 – July 15, 1863
- Country: United States
- Allegiance: Union
- Branch: Infantry
- Size: 792 (July 1, 1861); 620 (October 1, 1862); 370 (July 1, 1863)
- Part of: Army of the Potomac
- Nickname: Washington Volunteers
- Equipment: Austrian Lorenz Model 1854
- Engagements: Siege of Yorktown; Battle of Williamsburg; Battle of Seven Pines; Seven Days Battles; Battle of Antietam; Battle of Fredericksburg; Second Battle of Fredericksburg; New York Draft Riots

The 36th New York Infantry Regiment, nicknamed the "Washington Volunteers" was an infantry regiment that served in the Union army during the American Civil War.

The members of the regiment consisted of Irishmen and British New Yorkers, who were from the New York British Volunteers, a unit that was transferred to the 36th, whose officers were mainly made up of veterans from the Crimean War.

The regiment participated in several important battles of the Eastern Theater, such as Seven Pines, Malvern Hill, Fredericksburg, and Chancellorsville. The regiment was also deployed to combat the New York Draft Riots.

== Organization ==
The regiment was mustered into service on June 17, 1861, for a term of three-years service.

The companies of the regiment were principally recruited and raised from the counties of:

- A – Buffalo County – Captain Eliha J. Faxon
- B – Newburgh – Captain James A. Raney
- C – New York City – Captain William H. Bennett
- D – New York City – Captain J. Towndsend Daniel
- E – New York City – Captain William H. Bennett
- F – New York City – Captain Gustavus Dupins
- G – New York City – Captain Israel G. Atwood
- H – New York City – Captain Captain John Mason
- I – Brooklyn County and New York City – Captain Walter Darwent
- K – New York City – Captain Jason J. Walsh

== Service ==
=== Early Service ===
Once the regiment was mustered, it left the state on July 12, before proceeding to Washington D.C., where it was initially bivouacked at Meridian Hill, before it was sent to Brightwood, to be assigned to Couch's Brigade of the Army of the Potomac, and performed fatigue duty at Fort Massachusetts, remaining there until March 13, 1862, until they were sent to the Virginia Peninsula, to participate in McClellan's Peninsula Campaign.

=== The Peninsula Campaign ===
The regiment embarked at Fort Monroe on March 26, 1862, before it participated in the Siege of Yorktown, Lee's Mill. At the Battle of Seven Pines, the regiment lost 12 men killed, 29 wounded and 4 missing, with several officers being either killed or wounded.

The regiment proceeded to participate in the Seven Days Battles, fighting at Oak Grove, Savage's Station, White Oak Swamp, and Malvern Hill, where the regiment charged, and captured 65 prisoners, including the colors of the 14th North Carolina. During the battle, it lost over 20 men killed, including two officers, and 83 wounded, 36 missing.

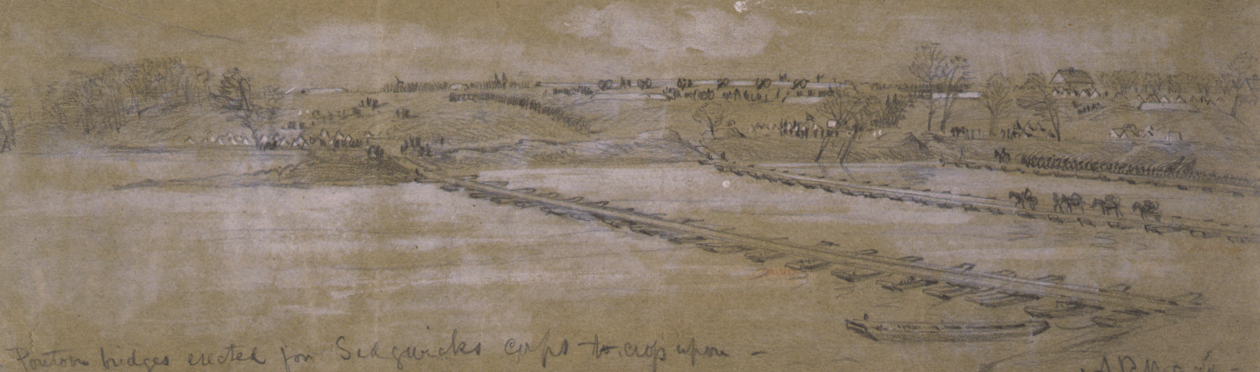
Pontoon bridges erected for Sedgwick's corps to cross upon, Alfred R. Waud, artist

=== Campaigns in Virginia ===
After the failure of the Peninsula Campaign, the regiment was transported to Centreville, where it participated in the Battle of Antietam, but was in reserve, and wasn't engaged for the rest of the battle. After the conclusion of the campaign, the regiment remained garrisoned in Maryland until October 29, 1862, when it marched to Falmouth, Virginia, and participated in the Battle of Fredericksburg, The regiment's losses were minimal, with only 1 man killed, alongside 2 officers wounded.

After the battle, the regiment participated in Burnside's abortive Mud March, before it was stationed at Falmouth again, until April 27, when it participated in the Chancellorsville Campaign, and fought in the Second Battle of Fredericksburg, and at Salem Church.

On June 14, the regiment was ordered to be mustered out, but before they were mustered out, the regiment was sent to New York City to combat the New York Draft Riots, where during that period, it lost only one enlisted man killed, Private William Joyce.

The regiment was mustered out of service on July 15, 1863, men whose terms weren't expired or new recruits were transferred to the 65th New York.

== Organizational affiliations, battle honors, detailed service, armaments ==
=== Organizational affiliations ===
During its service, the regiment was assigned to various larger formations, such as:

- Attached to Couch's Brigade, Division of the Potomac, to October. 1861.
- Couch's Brigade, Buell's Division, Army of the Potomac, to March, 1862.
- 1st Brigade, 1st Division, 4th Army Corps, Army of the Potomac, to September, 1862.
- 2nd Brigade, 3rd Division, 6th Army Corps, to June, 1863.

=== List of battles ===
The official list of battles the regiment bore a part of:

- Siege of Yorktown
- Battle of Williamsburg
- Battle of Fair Oaks
- Battle of Oak Grove
- Battle of Savage's Station
- Battle of White Oak Swamp
- Battle of Malvern Hill
- Battle of Antietam (In reserve)
- Battle of Fredericksburg
- Second Battle of Fredericksburg
- Battle of Salem Church
- New York Draft Riots

=== Detailed service ===
The Bolded are campaigns.

==== 1861 ====
- Organized at New York City and mustered in June 17, 1861.
- Left State for Washington, D. C., July 12.

==== 1862 ====
- Duty at Kalorma Heights and Camp Brightwood, Defences of Washington, D. C., till March, 1862.
- Moved to the Peninsula, Va., March 28.
- Siege of Yorktown April 5 – May 4.
- Battle of Williamsburg May 5.
- Reconnaissance to Bottom's Bridge May 20–23, and to White Oak Swamp May 25–28.
- Battle of Seven Pines or Fair Oaks May 31 – June 1.
- Seven days before Richmond June 25 – July 1.
- Oak Grove near Seven Pines June 25.
- Savage Station June 29.
- White Oak Swamp June 30.
- Malvern Hill July 1.
- At Harrison's Landing till August 16.
- Moved to Fortress Monroe, thence to Centreville August 16–27.
- **Maryland Campaign September 6–22.**
- Battle of Antietam September 16–17.
- Duty in Maryland till October 29
- Movement to Falmouth October and November.
- Battle of Fredericksburg, VA., December 12–15

==== 1863 ====
- "Mud March" January 20–24, 1863.
- At Falmouth till April.
- **Chancellorsville Campaign April 27 – May 6.**
- Operations at Franklin's Crossing April 29 – May 1.
- Maryes Heights, Fredericksburg, May 3.
- Salem Heights May 3–4.
- Banks' Ford May 4.
- Deep Run Ravine June 5–13.
- Ordered home for muster out.
- Three years men transferred to 65th Regiment, New York Infantry.
- Duty in New York during draft riots July 13–15.
- Mustered out July 15, 1863, expiration of term.

== Casualties ==
The regiment lost 1 officer and 36 men killed or mortally wounded, including 4 officers and 26 men by disease, for a total of 67 aggregate.

== Commanders ==
- Col. Charles H. Innes – (discharged on July 6, 1862, due to ill health)
- Col. William Brown – (Mustered out on July 15, 1863)

== See also ==
- List of New York Civil War regiments
- New York in the American Civil War

== Sources ==
- Dyer, Frederick H. (1908). A Compendium of the War of the Rebellion. Des Moines, IA: Dyer Pub. Co.
