= Soviet Army =

Land warfare branch of the Soviet Armed Forces (1946–1992)

Soviet Ground Forces
- Советские сухопутные войска
- Founded: 25 February 1946
- Disbanded: 14 February 1992
- Country: Soviet Union (1946–1991); CIS (1991–1992)
- Type: Army
- Role: Land warfare
- Size: 3,668,075 active (1991), peak 14,332,483 in 1945; 4,129,506 reserve (1991), peak 17,383,291 in 1945
- Part of: Soviet Armed Forces
- Nickname: "Red Army"
- Mottos: За нашу Советскую Родину! Za nashu Sovetskuyu Rodinu! "For our Soviet Motherland!"
- Equipment: About 55,000 tanks (1991); Over 70,000 armored personnel carriers; 24,000 infantry fighting vehicles; 33,000 towed artillery pieces; 9,000 self-propelled howitzers
- Engagements: See list: Eastern European anti-Communist insurgencies; Korean War; East German uprising of 1953; Hungarian Revolution of 1956; Cuban Missile Crisis; Vietnam War; Warsaw Pact invasion of Czechoslovakia; War of Attrition; Angolan Civil War; Ogaden War; Ethiopian Civil War; Soviet–Afghan War; Black January; January Events; 1991 Soviet coup d'état attempt

Commanders
- Notable commanders: Georgy Zhukov

The Soviet Ground Forces (Russian: Советские сухопутные войска, romanized: Sovetskiye sukhoputnye voyska) also known as the Soviet Army was the land warfare service branch of the Soviet Armed Forces from 1946 to 1992. It was preceded by the Red Army.

After the Soviet Union ceased to exist in December 1991, the Ground Forces remained under the command of the Commonwealth of Independent States until it was formally abolished on 14 February 1992. The Soviet Ground Forces were principally succeeded by the Russian Ground Forces in Russian territory. Outside of Russia, many units and formations were taken over by the post-Soviet states; some were withdrawn to Russia, and some dissolved amid conflict, notably in the Caucasus.

In Soviet military parlance the term armiya (army) referred to the combined land and air components of the Soviet Armed Forces, encompassing the Ground Forces as well as the Strategic Rocket Forces, the Air Defence Forces, and the Air Forces.

== After World War II ==
At the end of World War II the Red Army had over 500 rifle divisions and about a tenth that number of tank formations. Their war experience gave the Soviets such faith in tank forces that the infantry force was cut significantly (500 to roughly 175 divisions). A total of 130 rifle divisions were disbanded in the Groups of Forces in Eastern Europe in summer 1945, as well as 2nd Guards Airborne Division, and by the end of 1946, another 193 rifle divisions ceased to exist. Five or more rifle divisions disbanded contributed to the formation of NKVD convoy divisions, some used for escorting Japanese prisoners of war. The Tank Corps of the late war period were converted to tank divisions.

From 1945 to 1948, the Soviet Armed Forces were reduced from about 11.3 million to about 2.8 million men, a demobilisation controlled first, by increasing the number of military districts to 33, then reduced to 21 in 1946. The personnel strength of the Ground Forces was reduced from 9.8 million to 2.4 million.

The Land Forces Main Command was created for the first time in March 1946. Marshal of the Soviet Union Georgy Zhukov became Chief of the Soviet Ground Forces in March 1946, but was quickly succeeded by Ivan Konev in July 1946. By September 1946, the army decreased from 5 million soldiers to 2.7 million in the Soviet Union and from 2 million to 1.5 million in Europe. Four years later the Main Command was disbanded, an organisational gap that "probably was associated in some manner with the Korean War".

V.I. Feskov et al 2004 wrote:

In 1955, following the renumbering of numerous divisions and various reorganizations, the Ground Forces comprised 65 mechanized, 30 tank, 14 airborne, and approximately 120 rifle divisions. By 1957, these figures had shifted somewhat: there were 47 tank, 11 airborne, and about 180 motor rifle divisions. The transformations of 1965 (and that decade) did not alter the types of divisions but significantly changed their designations and partially modified their organizational and staffing structures. Reductions in the late 1950s and early 1960s slightly lowered these totals (to 45, 10, and 154, respectively), but the 1960s saw an increase—driven in no small part by deteriorating relations with China—resulting in 50 tank, 10 airborne, and approximately 140 motor rifle divisions.

The Main Command was reformed in 1955. From 1957 the rifle divisions were converted to motor rifle divisions (MRDs). MRDs had three motorized rifle regiments and a tank regiment, for a total of ten motor rifle battalions and six tank battalions; tank divisions had the proportions reversed.

On 24 February 1964, the Defense Council of the Soviet Union decided to disband the Ground Forces Main Command, with almost the same wording as in 1950 (the corresponding order of the USSR Minister of Defense on disbandment was signed on 7 March 1964). Its functions were transferred to the General Staff, while the chiefs of the combat arms and specialised forces came under the direct command of the minister of defence. The Main Command was then recreated again in November 1967. Army General Ivan Pavlovsky was appointed Commander-in-Chief of Ground Forces with effect from 5 November 1967.

To establish and secure the USSR's eastern European geopolitical interests, Red Army troops who liberated eastern Europe from Nazi rule in 1945 remained in place to secure pro-Soviet régimes in Eastern Europe. Elsewhere, they may have assisted the NKVD in suppressing anti-Soviet resistance in Western Ukraine (1941–1955) and the Forest Brothers in the three Baltic states. Soviet troops, including the 39th Army, remained at Port Arthur and Dalian on the northeast Chinese coast until 1955. Control was then handed over to the new Chinese communist government.

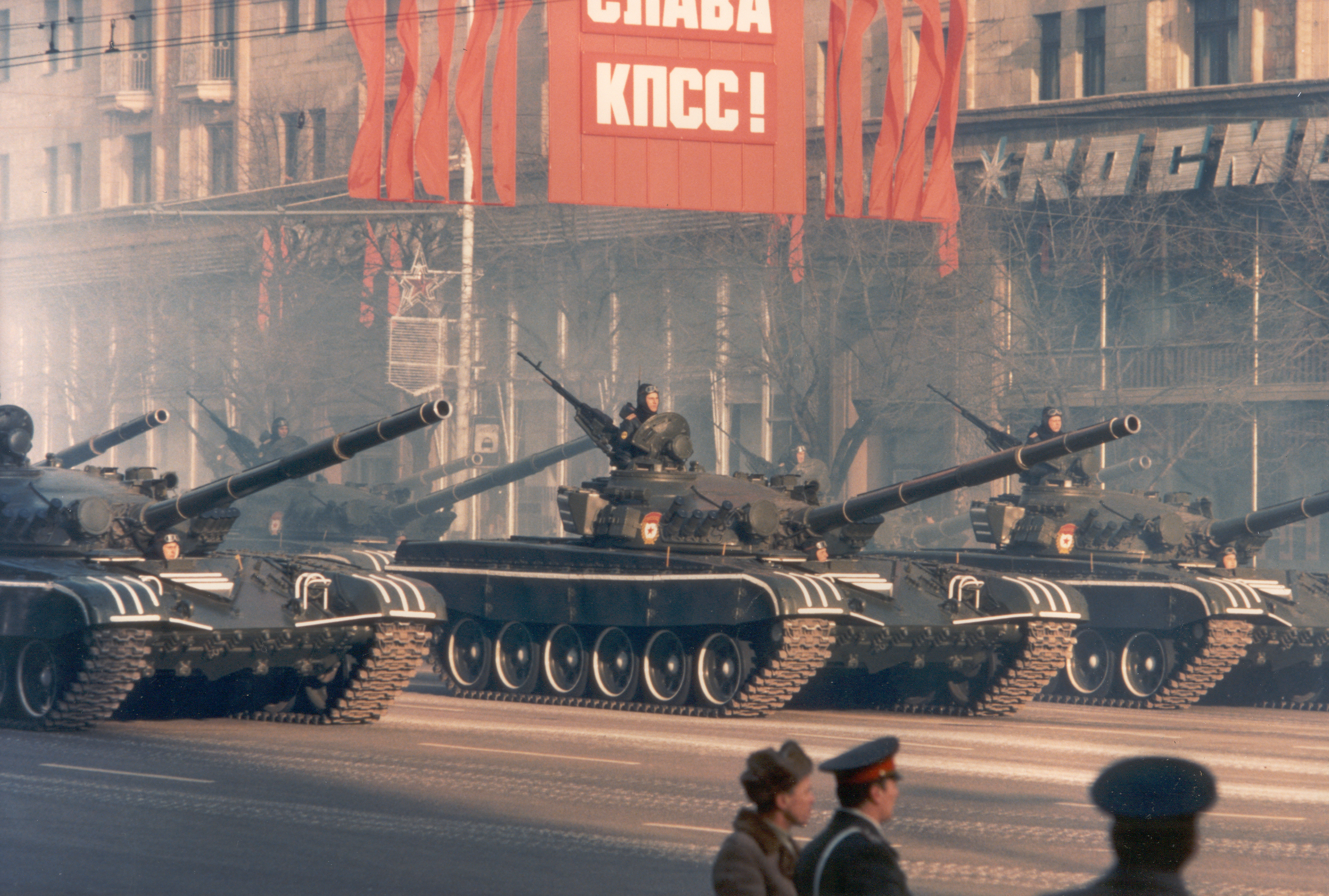
Parade forming part of the celebration of the October Revolution celebration in 1983.

Within the Soviet Union, the troops and formations of the Ground Forces were divided among the military districts. There were 32 of them in 1945. Sixteen districts remained from the mid-1970s to the end of the USSR (see table). Yet, the greatest Soviet Army concentration was in the Group of Soviet Forces in Germany, which suppressed the anti-Soviet Uprising of 1953 in East Germany. East European Groups of Forces were the Northern Group of Forces in Poland, and the Southern Group of Forces in Hungary, which put down the Hungarian Revolution of 1956. In 1958, Soviet troops were withdrawn from Romania. The Central Group of Forces in Czechoslovakia was established after Warsaw Pact intervention against the Prague Spring of 1968. In 1969, in the far east of the Soviet Union, the Sino-Soviet border conflict (1969) prompted establishment of a 16th military district, the Central Asian Military District, at Alma-Ata, Kazakhstan.

== Cold War ==
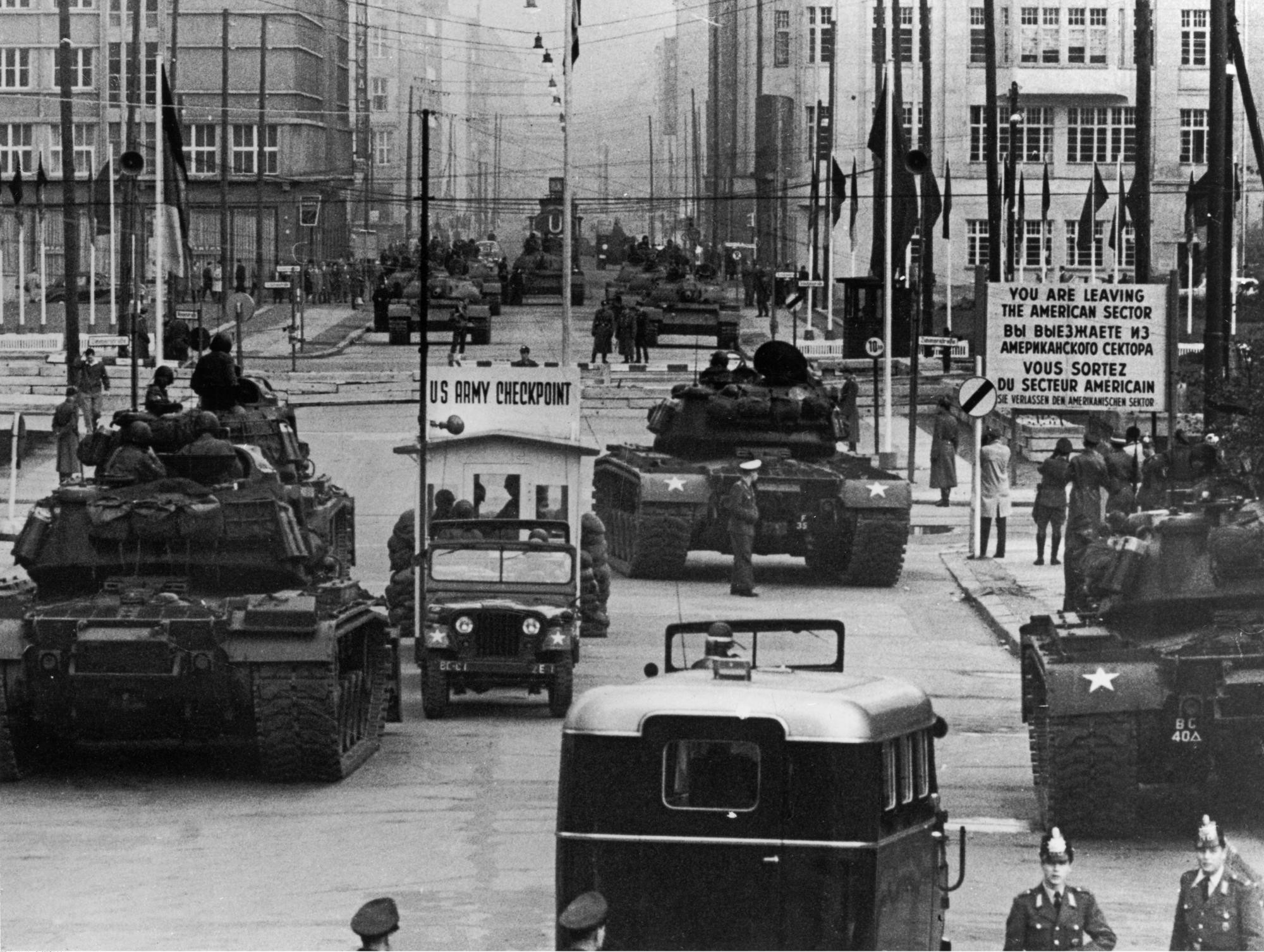
US tanks and Soviet tanks at Checkpoint Charlie, October 1961

From 1947 to 1989, Western intelligence agencies estimated that the Soviet Ground Forces' strength remained c. 2.8 million to c. 5.3 million men. In 1989 the Ground Forces had two million men. To maintain those numbers, Soviet law required a three-year military service obligation from every able man of military age, until 1967, when the Ground Forces reduced it to a two-year draft obligation. By the 1970s, the change to a two-year system seems to have created the hazing practice known as dedovshchina, "rule of the grandfathers", which destroyed the status of most NCOs. Instead the Soviet system relied very heavily on junior officers. Soviet Armed Forces life could be "grim and dangerous": a Western researcher talking to former Soviet officers was told, in effect that this was because they did not "value human life".

By the middle of the 1980s, the Ground Forces contained about 210 divisions. About three-quarters were motor rifle divisions and the remainder tank divisions. There were also a large number of artillery divisions, separate artillery brigades, engineer formations, and other combat support formations. However, only relatively few formations were fully war ready. By 1983, Soviet divisions were divided into either "Ready" or "Not Ready" categories, each with three subcategories. The internal military districts usually contained only one or two fully Ready divisions, with the remainder lower strength formations. The Soviet system anticipated a war preparation period which would bring the strength of the Ground Forces up to about three million.

Soviet planning for most of the Cold War period would have seen Armies of four to five divisions operating in Fronts made up of around four armies (and roughly equivalent to Western Army Groups). On 8 February 1979, the first of the new High Commands, for the Far East, was created at Ulan-Ude in Buryatia under Army General Vasily Petrov. In September 1984, three more were established to control multi-Front operations in Europe (the Western and South-Western Strategic Directions) and at Baku to supervise three southern military districts. Western analysts expected these new headquarters to control multiple Fronts in time of war, and usually a Soviet Navy Fleet.

In 1955, the Soviet Union established the Warsaw Pact with its Eastern European socialist allies, solidifying military coordination between Soviet forces and their socialist counterparts. The Ground Forces created and directed the Eastern European armies in its image for the remainder of the Cold War, shaping them for a potential confrontation with the North Atlantic Treaty Organization (NATO). After 1956, Nikita Khrushchev, General Secretary of the Communist Party, reduced the Ground Forces to build up the Strategic Rocket Forces, emphasizing the armed forces' nuclear capabilities. He removed Marshal Georgy Zhukov from the Politburo in 1957 for opposing these reductions in the Ground Forces. Nonetheless, Soviet forces possessed too few theater-level nuclear weapons to fulfill war-plan requirements until the mid-1980s. The General Staff maintained plans to invade Western Europe whose massive scale was only made publicly available after researchers gained access to Eastern Bloc files following the dissolution of the Soviet Union.

=== Korean War ===
The Red Army advanced into northern Korea in 1945 after the end of World War II, with the intention of aiding in the process of rebuilding the country. Marshals Kirill Meretskov and Terentii Shtykov explained to Joseph Stalin the necessity of Soviet help in building infrastructure and industry in northern Korea. Additionally, the Soviets aided in the creation of the North Korean People's Army and Korean People's Air Force. The Soviets believed it would be strategic to the Soviet Union to support Korea's growth directly. When northern Korea eventually wished to invade South Korea in 1950, Kim Il Sung traveled to Moscow to gain approval from Stalin. It was granted with full support, leading to the full-scale invasion of South Korea on 25 June.

=== Vietnam War ===
The Soviet Union supplied North Vietnam with medical supplies, arms, tanks, planes, helicopters, artillery, anti-aircraft missiles and other military equipment. Soviet crews fired Soviet-made surface-to-air missiles at U.S. F-4 Phantoms, which were shot down over Thanh Hóa in 1965. Over a dozen Soviet soldiers lost their lives in this conflict. Following the dissolution of the Soviet Union in 1991, Russian Federation officials acknowledged that the Soviet Union had stationed up to 3,000 troops in Vietnam during the war.

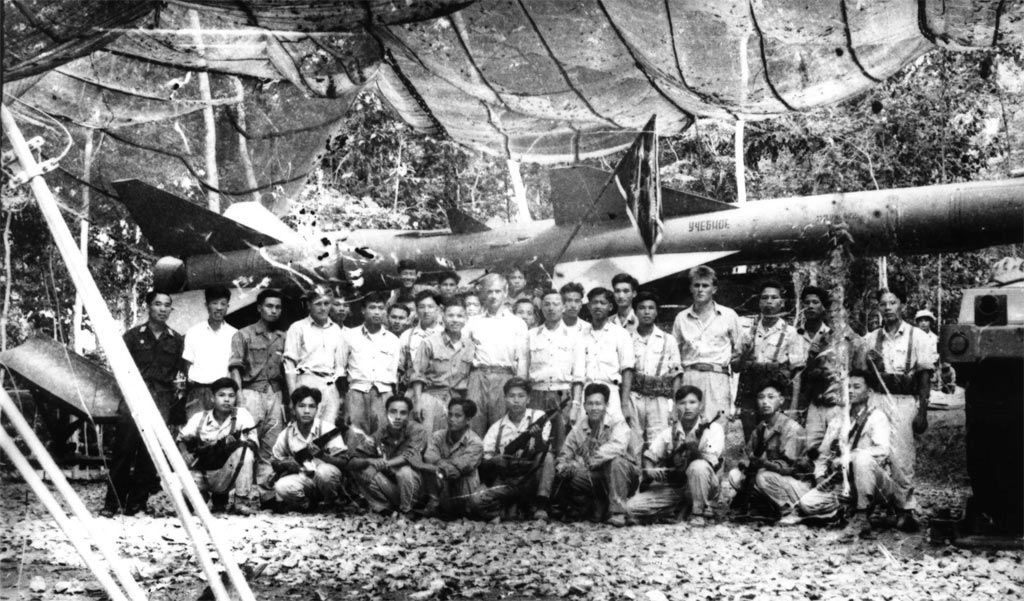
Soviet anti-air instructors and North Vietnamese crewmen in the spring of 1965 at an anti-aircraft training center in Vietnam

Some Russian sources give more specific numbers. Between 1953 and 1991, the hardware donated by the Soviet Union included 2,000 tanks, 1,700 APCs, 7,000 artillery guns, over 5,000 anti-aircraft guns, 158 surface-to-air missile launchers, and 120 helicopters. During the war, the Soviets sent North Vietnam annual arms shipments worth $450 million. From July 1965 to the end of 1974, fighting in Vietnam was observed by some 6,500 officers and generals, as well as more than 4,500 soldiers and sergeants of the Soviet Armed Forces. In addition, Soviet military schools and academies began training Vietnamese soldiers—in all more than 10,000 military personnel.

The KGB had also helped develop the signals intelligence (SIGINT) capabilities of the North Vietnamese, through an operation known as Vostok (also known as Phương Đông, meaning "Orient" and named after the Vostok 1). The Vostok program was a counterintelligence and espionage program. These programs were pivotal in detecting and defeating CIA and South Vietnamese commando teams sent into North Vietnam, as they were detected and captured. The Soviets helped the Ministry of Public Security recruit foreigners within high-level diplomatic circles among the Western-allies of the US, under a clandestine program known as "B12,MM" which produced thousands of high-level documents for nearly a decade, including targets of B-52 strikes. In 1975, the SIGINT services had broken information from Western US-allies in Saigon, determining that the US would not intervene to save South Vietnam from collapse.

=== Soviet-Afghan War ===
In 1979, the Soviet Union invaded Afghanistan to prop up its puppet government, provoking a 10-year Afghan mujahideen guerrilla resistance. Between 850,000 and 1.5 million civilians were killed and millions of Afghans fled the country as refugees, mostly to Pakistan and Iran.

Prior to the arrival of Soviet troops, the pro-Soviet Nur Mohammad Taraki government took power in a 1978 coup and initiated a series of radical modernization reforms throughout the country. Vigorously suppressing any opposition from among the traditional Muslim Afghans, the government arrested thousands and executed as many as 27,000 political prisoners. By April 1979 large parts of the country were in open rebellion and by December the government had lost control of territory outside of the cities. In response to Afghan government requests, the Soviet government under leader Leonid Brezhnev first sent covert troops to advise and support the Afghan government, but, on December 24, 1979, began the first deployment of the 40th Army. Arriving in the capital Kabul on 27 December, they staged a coup, killing the president Hafizullah Amin, and installing a rival socialist Babrak Karmal, who was viewed as more moderate and fit to lead the nation.

While the Soviet government initially hoped to secure Afghanistan's towns and road networks, stabilize the communist regime, and withdraw from the region within the span of one year, they experienced major difficulties in the region, due to rough terrain and fierce guerrilla resistance. Soviet presence would reach near 115,000 troops by the mid-1980s, and the complications of the war increased, causing a high amount of military, economic, and political cost. After Soviet general secretary Mikhail Gorbachev realized the economic, diplomatic, and human toll the war was placing on the Soviet Union, he announced the withdrawal of six regiment of troops (about 7,000 men) on 28 July 1986. In January 1988 Foreign Minister Eduard Shevardnadze announced that it was hoped that "1988 would be the last year of the Soviet troops stay"; the forces pulled out in the bitter winter cold of January–February 1989.

==== Military costs ====
The cost for the military due to the war is estimated to have been roughly 15 billion rubles in 1989. The combat casualties estimates at 30,000–35,000. During 1984–1985, more than 300 aircraft were lost, and thus a significant military cost of the war is attributed to air operations. Since the first year, the government spend roughly 2.5–3.0% of the yearly military budget on funding the war in Afghanistan, increasing steadily in cost until its peak in 1986.

The Soviet Army also suffered from deep losses in morale and public approval due to the conflict and its failure. Many injured and disabled veterans of the war returned to the Soviet Union facing public scrutiny and difficulty re-entering civilian society, creating a new social group known as "Afgantsy". These men would become influential in popular culture and politics of the time.

== Dissolution of the Soviet Union ==
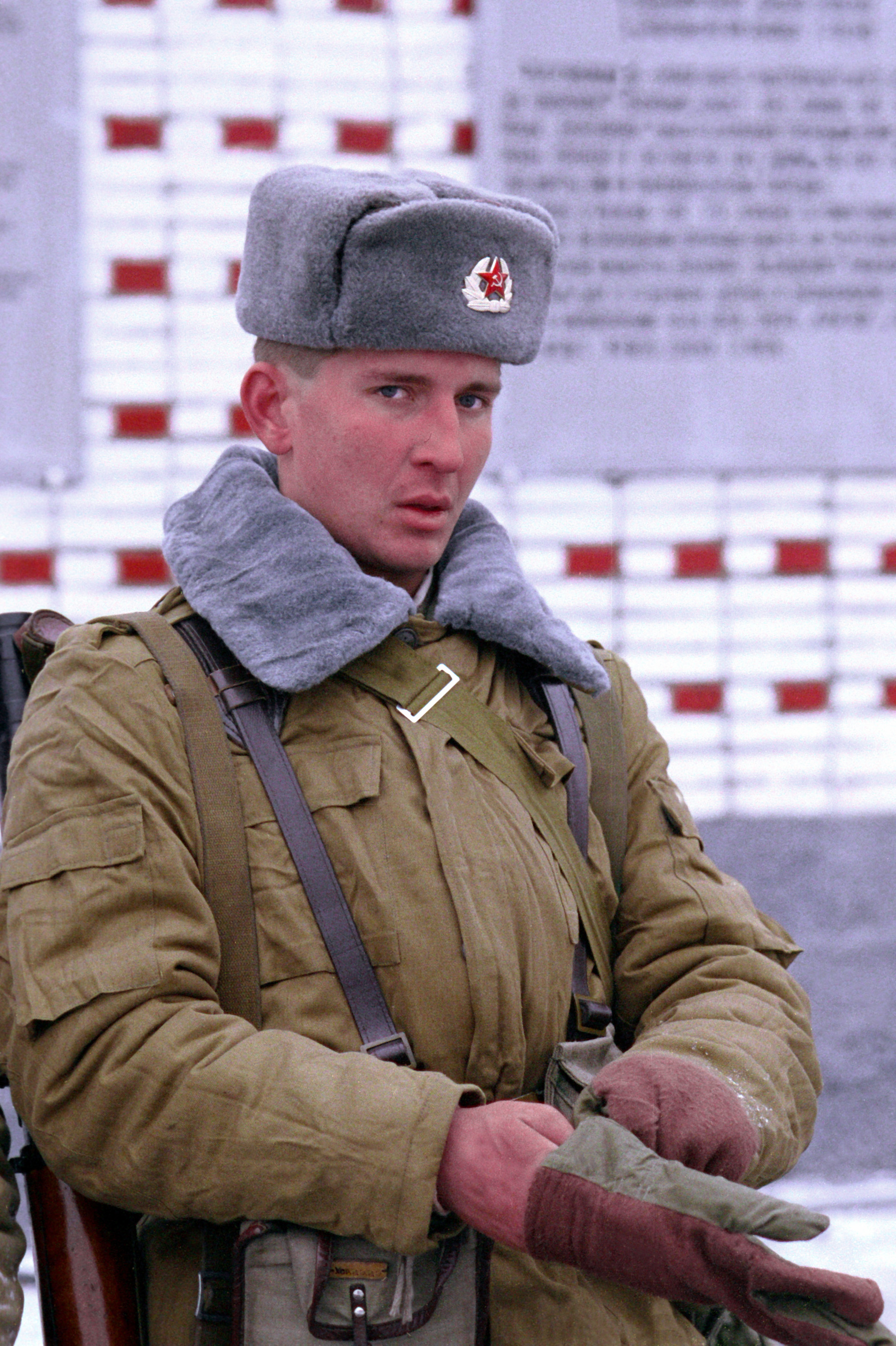
A Russian soldier of the 2nd Guards Tamanskaya Motor Rifle Division in Moscow, January 1992, a few weeks after the dissolution of the USSR. He is wearing the Soviet winter Afghanka uniform.

From 1985 to 1991, General Secretary Gorbachev attempted to reduce the strain the Armed Forces were placing on the Economy of the Soviet Union.

Gorbachev slowly reduced the size of the Armed Forces, including through a unilateral force reduction announcement of 500,000 in December 1988. A total of 50,000 personnel were to come from Eastern Europe, the forces in Mongolia (totaling five divisions and 75,000 troops) were to be reduced, but the remainder was to come from units inside the Soviet Union. There were major problems encountered in trying to organise the return of 500,000 personnel into civilian life, including where the returned soldiers were to live, housing, jobs, and training assistance. Then the developing withdrawals from Czechoslovakia and from Hungary and the changes implicit in the Conventional Forces in Europe treaty began to spark more disruption. The withdrawals became extremely chaotic; there was significant hardship for officers and their families, and "large numbers of weapons and vast stocks of equipment simply disappeared through theft, misappropriation and the black market."

In February 1989, Defence Minister Dmitri Yazov outlined five major planned changes in Izvestiya, the Soviet official newspaper of record. First, the combined arms formations, divisions and armies, would be reorganised, and as a result division numbers would be reduced almost by half; second, tank regiments would be removed from all the motor rifle (mechanised infantry) divisions in East Germany and Czechoslovakia, and tank divisions would also lose a tank regiment; air assault and river crossing units would be removed from both East Germany and Czechoslovakia; fourth, defensive systems and units would rise in number under the new divisional organisation; and finally the troop level in the European part of the USSR would drop by 200,000, and by 60,000 in the southern part of the USSR. A number of motor-rifle formations would be converted into machine gun and artillery forces intended for defensive purposes only. Three-quarters of the troops in Mongolia would be withdrawn and disbanded, including all the air force units there.

The Armed Forces were extensively involved in the 19–21 August 1991 Soviet coup d'état attempt to depose President Gorbachev. Commanders despatched tanks into Moscow, yet the coup failed.

On 8 December 1991, the presidents of Russia, Belarus, and Ukraine formally dissolved the USSR, and then constituted the Commonwealth of Independent States (CIS). Soviet President Gorbachev resigned on 25 December 1991; the next day, the USSR itself was dissolved. During the next 18 months, inter-republican political efforts to transform the Army of the Soviet Union into the CIS Armed Forces failed; eventually, the forces stationed in the republics became the basis of the successor states' armed forces.

After the dissolution of the Soviet Union, the Ground Forces dissolved and the fifteen Soviet successor states divided their assets among themselves. The divide mostly occurred along a regional basis, with Soviet soldiers from Russia becoming part of the new Russian Ground Forces, while Soviet soldiers originating from Kazakhstan became part of the new Kazakh Armed Forces. As a result, the bulk of the Soviet Ground Forces, including most of the Scud and Scaleboard surface-to-surface missile (SSM) forces, became incorporated in the Russian Ground Forces. 1992 estimates showed five SSM brigades with 96 missile vehicles in Belarus and 12 SSM brigades with 204 missile vehicles in Ukraine, compared to 24 SSM brigades with over 900 missile vehicles under Russian Ground Forces' control, some in other former Soviet republics. By the end of 1992, most remnants of the Soviet Army in former Soviet Republics had disbanded or dispersed. Forces in the former Satellite states of Eastern Europe (including the Germany; Poland, and the Baltic states) gradually returned home between 1992 and 1994.

The list of Soviet Army divisions sketches some of the fates of the individual parts of the Ground Forces.

In mid-March 1992, Russian president Boris Yeltsin appointed himself as the new Russian minister of defence, marking a crucial step in the creation of the new Russian Armed Forces, comprising the bulk of what was left of the Soviet Armed Forces. The last vestiges of the old Soviet command structure were finally dissolved in June 1993, when the paper Commonwealth of Independent States Military Headquarters was reorganized as a staff for facilitating CIS military cooperation.

In the next few years, the former Soviet Ground Forces withdrew from central and Eastern Europe (including the Baltic states), as well as from the newly independent post-Soviet republics of Azerbaijan, Armenia, Uzbekistan, Kazakhstan, Turkmenistan and Kyrgyzstan. Now-Russian Ground Forces remained in Tajikistan, Georgia and Transnistria (in Moldova).

== Structure ==
From the 1950s to the 1980s the branches ("rods") of the Ground Forces included the Motor Rifle Troops; the Soviet Airborne Forces, from April 1956 to March 1964; Air Assault Troops (Airborne Assault Formations of the Ground Forces of the USSR, from 1968 to August 1990); the Tank Troops; the Rocket Forces and Artillery (from 1961); Army Aviation (see ru:Армейская авиация Российской Федерации), until December 1990; Signals Troops; the Engineer Troops; the Air Defence Troops of the Ground Forces; the Chemical Troops of the USSR; and the Rear of the Ground Forces.

=== Military districts in 1990 ===
The extent military districts in 1990 were:

- Leningrad Military District
- Belorussian Military District
- Baltic Military District
- Carpathian Military District
- Kiev Military District
- Odessa Military District
- Moscow Military District
- Volga-Urals Military District
- North Caucasus Military District
- Transcaucasian Military District
- Turkestan Military District
- Siberian Military District
- Transbaikal Military District
- Far Eastern Military District
- Central Asian Military District (dissolved in 1988 with the Volga and Urals Military Districts merged around 1991)

=== Experimental army corps in the 1980s ===
The Soviet General Staff experimented with the inclusion of landing assault units in experimental combined arms corps. Two such corps were formed in the mid-1980s with the task to exploit and widen the operational breakthrough in offensive operations.

- In the Belorussian Military District the 120th Guards, Rogachyovskaya, awarded the Order of the Red Banner, the Order of Suvorov and the Order of Kutuzov Motor Rifle Division (120-я гвардейская мотострелковая Рогачёвская Краснознамённая, орденов Суворова и Кутузова дивизия) was transformed into the 5th Guards Combined Arms Army Corps'"Supreme Soviet of the Byelorussian SSR" (5-й отдельный Гвардейский общевойсковой армейский Рогачевский Краснознаменный орденов Суворова и Кутузова корпус им. Верховного Совета БССР.
- In the Transbaikal Military District the 5th Guards, Budapeshtenskaya, awarded the Order of the Red Banner, Don Cossacks Tank Division (5-я Гвардейская танковая Будапештская Краснознамённая Донская казачья дивизия) was transformed into the 48th Guards Combined Arms Army Corps (48-й Гвардейский общевойсковой армейский корпус).

Each corps consisted of a corps headquarters, two tank brigades, two mechanised brigades, a landing assault regiment of two battalions and support units and a helicopter regiment (organized into an HQ, a Mi-24 attack squadron, a Mi-8 assault squadron and a Mi-26 heavy transport squadron of 20 aircraft each). The combat and service support units were similar to those found in a tank or motor rifle division. The 5th Corps had the 1318th Separate Landing Assault Regiment and 276th Separate Helicopter Regiment, while the 48th Corps had the 1319th Separate Landing Assault Regiment and 373rd Separate Helicopter Regiment. Around 1987-88 the two corps were disbanded and reverted to divisions, losing their landing troops and helicopters.

=== Landing Assault units of the Soviet Ground Forces ===
Around the time of the strategic Exercise Dnepr-67 (ru:Днепр (учения)) came the organization of the first Soviet air assault formation. Shortly before it the 51st Guards Parachute-Landing Regiment (51-й гв. пдп) was transformed into the 1st Separate Air Assault Brigade (1-я отдельная Воздушно-штурмовая бригада (1-я овшбр)) and this experimental formation was put under the command of Major General Kobzar', Chief of the Combat Training Department of the Airborne Forces HQ. The task of the brigade in the massive exercise was to land with helicopters on the riverside of the River Dnieper and secure a beachhead for the forcing of the river by the main forces. This was executed successfully and the lessons learned were used for the formation of regular air assault brigades. A General Staff Directive from May 22, 1968, ordered the formation of the first brigades. They were under the Soviet Ground Forces and by August 1970 the first two active brigades were:

- 13th Air Assault Brigade (13-я отдельная Воздушно-штурмовая бригада (13-я овшбр)) in the villages of Nikolayevka and Zavitinsk, Amur Oblast, under the Far Eastern Military District and the
- 11th Air Assault Brigade (11-я отдельная Воздушно-штурмовая бригада (11-я овшбр)) in the village of Mogocha, Chita Oblast, under the Transbaikal Military District.

These brigades had organic aviation units and had the following structure:

- Brigade HQ (управление бригады)
- 3x Separate Air Assault Battalions (три отдельные воздушно-штурмовые батальоны)
- Artillery Battalion (артиллерийский дивизион)
- Air Defence Artillery Battalion (зенитно-артиллерийский дивизион)
- Combat Helicopter Regiment with its own Aviation Base (боевой вертолетный полк с авиационной базой)
- Transport Helicopter Regiment with its own Aviation Base (транспортный вертолетный полк с авиационной базой)
- Brigade logistics (тыл бригады)

Each aviation base consisted of an airfield support battalion and a signals and radio-technical support battalion. The brigade was tasked with executing tactical heliborne landings up to 100 km behind enemy lines. In the beginning of the 1970s the designation was changed from Separate Air Assault Brigade (отдельная воздушно-штурмовая бригада (овшбр)) to Separate Landing Assault Brigade (отдельная десантно-штурмовая бригада (одшбр)). In 1973 a third brigade was formed:

- 21st Separate Landing Assault Brigade (21-я одшбр)) in the Georgian city of Kutaisi under the Transcaucasian Military District.

The experimental 1st Separate Air Assault Brigade was fully staffed by Airborne Troops personnel due to its background, but the regular air assault brigades formed afterwards lacked any airborne parachute training and the majority of their officers came from the higher schools of the Ground Forces. The brigades carried the uniform of the motor rifle branch. In 1973 the landing assault brigades received a new table of organization:

- Brigade HQ (управление бригады) of 326 men;
- 3x Separate Landing Assault Battalions (три отдельные десантно-штурмовые батальоны) of 349 men each;
- Separate Artillery Battalion (отдельный артиллерийский дивизион) of 171 men;
- Aviation Group (авиационная группа) of 805 men;
- Separate Signals and Radio-technical Support Battalion (отдельный дивизион связи и радио-технического обеспечения) of 190 men;
- Separate Airfield Technical Support Battalion (отдельный батальон аэродромно-технического обеспечения) of 410 men.

The new air assault brigades were deemed successful and by the end of the 1970s several more brigades were formed under the military districts. In addition several separate landing assault battalions were formed as assets of combined arms and tank armies. In 1983 these forces started receiving parachute training and this put them under the training oversight of the Airborne Troops. The rapid expansion of the landing assault troops led to the disbanding of one airborne division in 1979. This was the 105th Guards Venskaya, awarded the Order of the Red Banner Airborne Landing Division (105-я гвардейская воздушно-десантная Венская Краснознаменная дивизия) with HQ in Fergana in the Fergana Valley, Uzbekistan SSR and command of the 111th, 345th, 351st and the 383rd Parachute Landing Regiments and additional support units. The division was specialized in warfare in mountain and arid regions and the decision to disband it proved to be a seriously misguided one in the coming Soviet–Afghan War. The division gave birth to the following formations:

- The 345th Parachute Landing Regiment (345-й пдп) retained its airborne qualification and remained deployed at the southern border of the USSR, reformed into the 345th Separate Parachute Landing Regiment.
- The 111th Parachute Landing Regiment (111-й пдп) based in Osh, Kirgiz SSR was used as the basis for the formation of the 14th Guards Separate Landing Assault Brigade (14-я гв одшбр) of the Western Group of Forces in Cottbus, GDR. In December 1979 the brigade was re-numbered from the 14th to the 35th Guards Separate Landing Assault Brigade (35-я гв одшбр).
- The 351st Parachute Landing Regiment (351-й пдп) was used for the formation of the 56th Guards Separate Landing Assault Brigade (56-я гв одшбр) of the Turkestan Military District with brigade HQ in the village of Azadbash near Chirchik, Uzbek SSR.
- The 383rd Parachute Landing Regiment (383-й пдп) based in the village of Aktogay, Taldy-Kurgan Oblast, Kazakh SSR was used for the formation of the 57th Separate Landing Assault Brigade (57-я одшбр) of the Central Asian Military District. The regiment was also used for the formation of the 58th Separate Landing Assault Brigade in Kremenchug of the Kiev Military District, but it was kept as a cadre formation in peacetime.
- The officers of the division HQ were used as the cadre for the formation of the 38th Separate Guards Venskaya, awarded the Order of the Red Banner Landing Assault Brigade (38-я отдельная Гвардейская Венская Краснознаменная десантно-штурмовая бригада) in Brest, subordinated to the Belorussian Military District.

From the late 1970s to the 1980s, 13 separate landing assault brigades were activated. These brigades provided air-mobile capability for military districts and groups of forces. In 1989, these brigades transferred to control of the VDV. During the same period, 19 separate landing assault battalions were activated. These battalions originally provided air-mobile capability to armies and other formations but were mostly disbanded in 1989.

In 1979, the 58th Air Assault Brigade was activated as a mobilization unit in Kremenchug. It was co-located with the 23rd Air Assault Brigade from 1986 and disbanded in 1989. The 128th Air Assault Brigade existed between 1986 and 1989 as a mobilization unit in Stavropol. The 130th Air Assault Brigade existed between 1986 and 1989 as a mobilization unit in Abakan.

- 11th Landing Assault Brigade (Mogocha, Transbaikal MD)
- 13th Landing Assault Brigade (Magdagachi, Far Eastern MD)
- 21st Landing Assault Brigade (Kutaisi, Transcaucasian MD)
- 23rd Landing Assault Brigade (Kremenchug, Southwestern TVD)
- 35th Guards Landing Assault Brigade (Cottbus, Group of Soviet Forces in Germany)
- 36th Landing Assault Brigade (Garbolovo, Leningrad MD) - formed autumn 1979.
- 37th Landing Assault Brigade (Chernyakhovsk, Baltic MD)
- 38th Guards Landing Assault Brigade (Brest, Belarusian MD)
- 39th Landing Assault Brigade (Khyriv, Carpathian MD)
- 40th Landing Assault Brigade (Nikolaev, Odessa MD)
- 56th Landing Assault Brigade (Ýolöten, Turkestan MD)
- 57th Landing Assault Brigade (Aktogay, Central Asian MD)
- 83rd Landing Assault Brigade (Byałogard, Polish People's Republic)

== Equipment ==
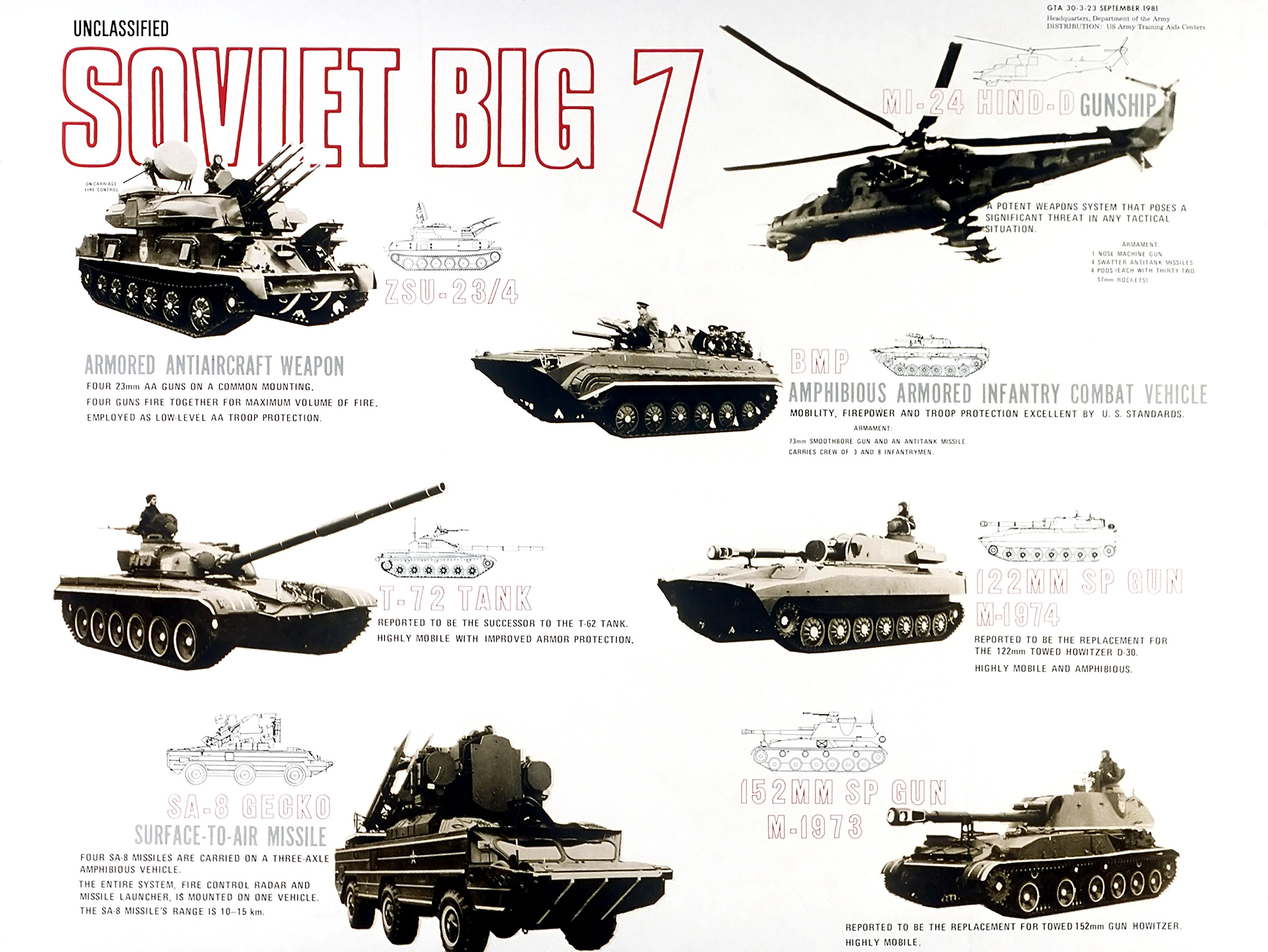
A U.S. assessment of the seven most important items of Soviet combat equipment in 1981

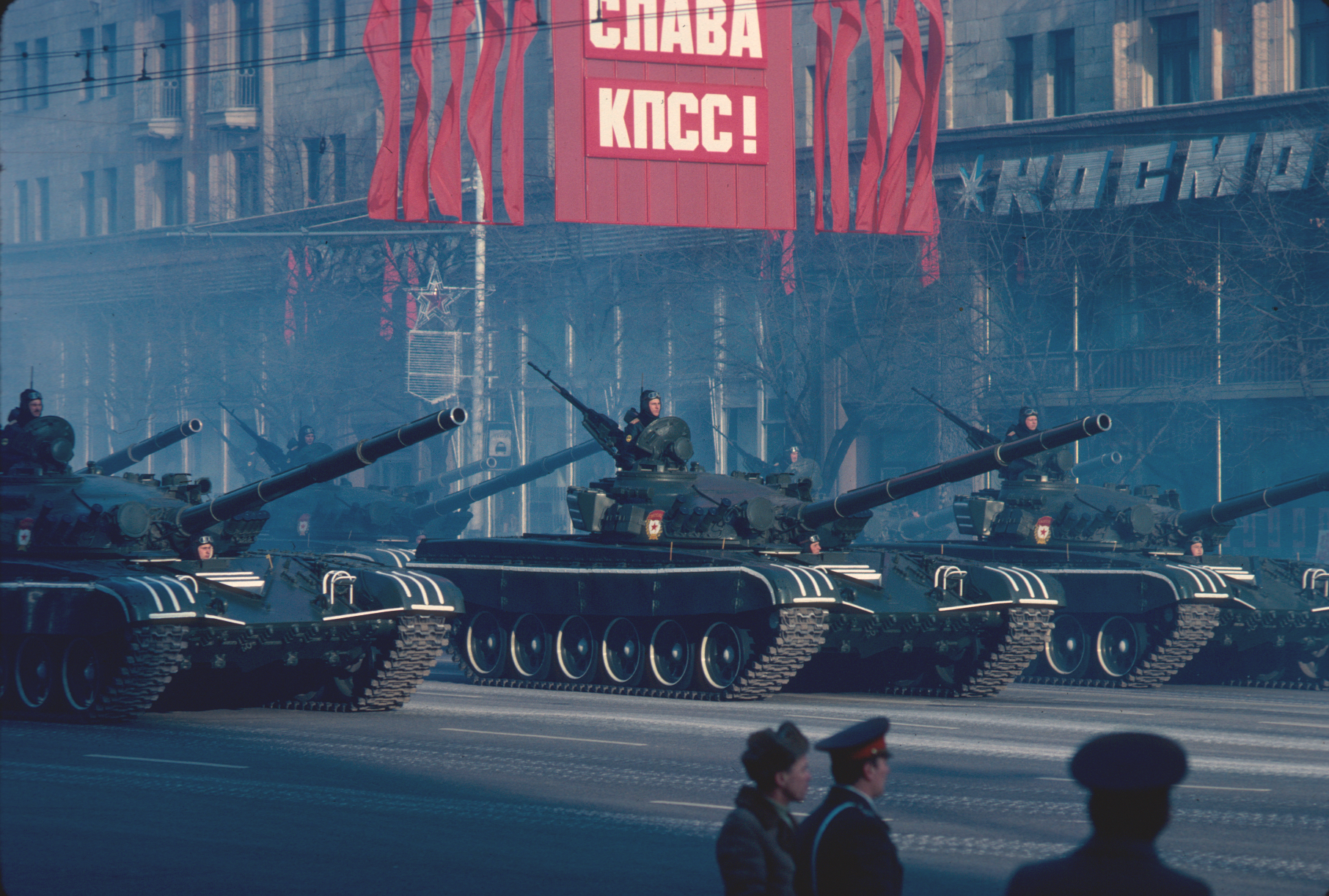
Soviet Army T-72A tanks during the 1983 October Revolution celebration in Moscow

In 1990 and 1991, the Soviet Ground Forces were estimated to possess the following equipment. The 1991 estimates are drawn from the IISS Military Balance and follow the Conventional Forces in Europe data exchange which revealed figures of November 1990.

Prior to the initial exchange of CFE data in November 1990, 17,580 main battle tanks; 18,000 artillery pieces; 15,900 "armoured cars"; and 800 combat aircraft were moved over the Urals, beyond the CFE area.

- about 54,400 main battle tanks as of 1 June 1991, including 5,400 T-80/-M 9, 9,000 T-72L/M, 4,900 T-64, 8,500 T-62, 10,600 T-54/55, and a further 16,000 in store east of the Ural Mountains beyond the Conventional Forces in Europe treaty area, types unknown.
- About 1,000 PT-76 light amphibious tanks as of 1 June 1991, including about 410 inside the CFE treaty area.
- over 50,000 armored personnel carriers as of 1 June 1991, including BTR-80, BTR-70, BTR-60, BTR-D, BTR-50, BTR-152, and 4,500 MT-LB.
- about 28,000 armoured infantry fighting vehicles (AIFV), including BMP-1, BMP-2, BMP-3, about a total of 3,000 BMD-1, BMD-2, and BMD-3. Over 16,500 AIFV were inside the CFE treaty area.
- 8,000 reconnaissance vehicles as of 1 June 1991 including 2,500 BRDM-2.
- 33,000 towed artillery pieces, including 4,379 D-30, 1,175 M-46, 1,700 D-20, 598 2A65, 1,007 2A36, 857 D-1, 1,693 ML-20, 1,200 M-30, 478 B-4 howitzers and D-74, D-48, D-44, T-12, and BS-3 field/anti-tank guns.
- about 9,000 self-propelled howitzers, including 2,751 2S1, 2,325 2S3, 507 2S5, 347 2S7, 430 2S4, 20 2S19, 108 152 mm SpGH DANA, ASU-85 (including for Soviet Airborne Forces), and 2S9.
- 8,000 rocket artillery pieces, of which about 2,330 were inside the CFE treaty area, including BM-21, 818 BM-27, 123 BM-30, 18 BM-24, TOS-1, BM-25, and BM-14 multiple rocket launchers.
- Scud, OTR-21 Tochka, OTR-23 Oka, and 9K52 Luna-M tactical ballistic missiles.
- 1,350 2K11 Krug, 850 2K12 Kub, 950 9K33 Osa, 430 9K31 Strela-1, 300 Buk missile system, 70 S-300 (missile), 860 9K35 Strela-10, 20 Tor missile system, 130 9K22 Tunguska, ZSU-23-4, and ZSU-57-2 army air defense vehicles.
- 12,000 towed anti-aircraft guns estimated in 1989. Types included ZU-23, ZPU-1/2/4, 57mm AZP S-60, 25mm 72-K, 61-K, 52-K, and KS-19.
- 4,500 helicopters as of 1 June 1991, including some 2,050 armed helicopters, of which 340 were reported as Mil Mi-8; 290 Mil Mi-17; 1,420 Mil Mi-24; some experimental Mil Mi-28 "Havocs;" some 1,510 transport, of which 450 were reported as Mil Mi-6; 1,000 Mi-8; 50 Mil Mi-26 heavy; and 10 Mil Mi-10 heavy; 200 Mi-8 electronic warfare helicopters, including "Hip-G" and "Hip-K"; 680 general-purpose helicopters including 600 Mil Mi-2 and 80 Mil Mi-8.

The Stockholm International Peace Research Institute reported in 1992 that the USSR had previously had over 20,000 tanks, 30,000 armoured combat vehicles, at least 13,000 artillery pieces, and just under 1,500 helicopters.

== Commanders-in-Chief of the Soviet Ground Forces ==
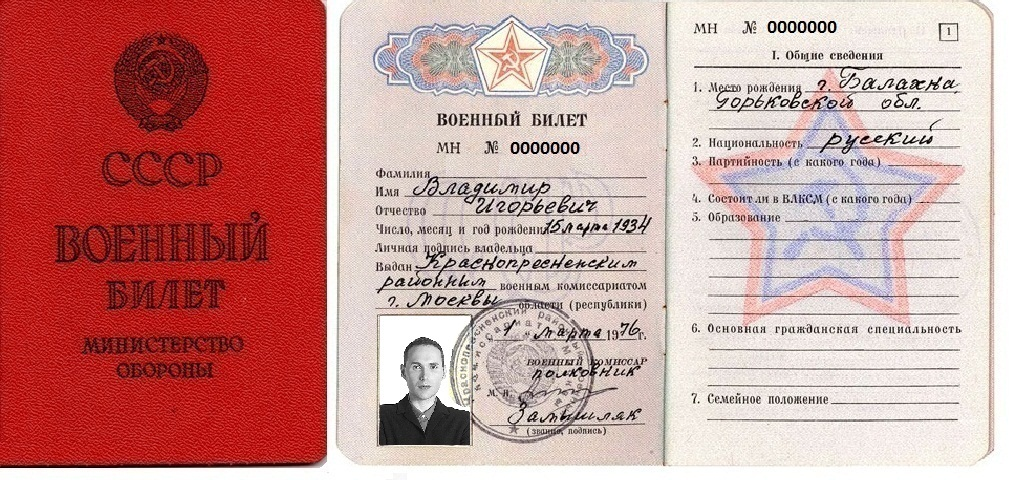
Soviet Army conscript's military service book.#1, Place of birth,#2 Nationality (i.e. ethnicity), #3 Party affiliation (i.e. the year of joining the CPSU), #4 Year of entering the Komsomol, #5 Education, #6 Main specialty, #7 Marital status. (Document number and the name are removed)

- Georgy Zhukov, from 21 March 1946
- Ivan Konev, 1946–50
- position of commander of ground forces did not exist from 1950 to 1955
- Ivan Konev, 1955–56
- Rodion Malinovsky, 1956–57
- Andrei Grechko, 1957–60
- Vasily Chuikov, 1960–64
- position of commander of ground forces did not exist from 1964 to 1967
- Ivan Pavlovsky, 1967–80
- Vasiliy Petrov, 1980–85
- Yevgeny Ivanovsky, 1985–89
- Valentin Varennikov, January 1989 until 30 August 1991
- Vladimir Semyonov became Commander-in-Chief of the Ground Forces on 31 August 1991, and remained in that post until 30 November 1996.
