= 36th Cavalry Division =

- Active: ? – 6 July 1941
- Country: Soviet Union
- Branch: Cavalry
- Role: Breakthrough and Exploitation in Deep Operations
- Size: Division

The 36th Cavalry Division was formed prior to 1939 and was assigned to the Belorussian Military District at the onset of Operation Barbarossa.

== Wartime Service ==
=== Soviet invasion of Poland ===
Assigned to the 11th Army's 3rd Cavalry Corps for the invasion of Poland.

=== 1941 ===
The division was located in Vawkavysk, Belarus. This placed it in a position to be attacked by the Germans during the opening hours of the next phase. On 22 June the division was ordered to form part of an Operations Group with the 6th Mechanized Corps to counterattack against the German forces. It was attacked on 23 June by the Luftwaffe causing severe casualties among the troops and horses. The division was effectively destroyed within 48 hours of the invasion and was officially disbanded on 6 July 1941.

== Subordinate Units ==
- 24th Cavalry Regiment
- 42nd Cavalry Regiment
- 102nd Cavalry Regiment
- 8th Tank Regiment (54 tanks and 3 armored cars)

== See also ==
- Cavalry Divisions of the Soviet Union 1917–1945
