= 36th Virginia Cavalry Battalion =

- Flag of Virginia, 1861
- Active: February 1863 – April 1865
- Disbanded: April 1865
- Country: Confederacy
- Allegiance: Confederate States of America
- Branch: Confederate States Army
- Type: Cavalry
- Engagements: Valley Campaigns of 1864; Appomattox Campaign; Battle of Five Forks

The 36th Virginia Cavalry Battalion was a cavalry battalion raised in Virginia for service in the Confederate States Army during the American Civil War. It fought mostly in western Virginia and the Shenandoah Valley, and also with the Army of Northern Virginia.

== Service ==
Virginia's 36th Cavalry Battalion was organized in February, 1863, with four companies, later increased to five. The men were recruited from the counties of Cabell, Braxton, Putnam, Kanawha, Boone and Greenbrier, now in West Virginia The unit was assigned to A.G. Jenkins', W.E. Jones', B.T. Johnson's, and Payne's Brigade.

At the Second Battle of Winchester on June 13, 1863, Major James W. Sweeny was wounded, Capt. Cornelious Thomas of Co. A taking command. The regiment had a force of 125 men at Gettysburg, and was involved in the Battle of Sporting Hill. A.G. Jenkins Brigade was within miles of the state capital at Sporting Hill, which, according to local legend, was named for its good hunting and abundant rabbits, ducks and waterfowl. An advance detachment of the 16th Virginia Cavalry Regiment, was at the McCormick Barn, of which remnants still stand today. Then, when the New York State Militia approached, the 36th, along with a portion of the 16th, crossed the road at Gleim's Farm, where a Denny's is now. This was an attempt to flanks the Federals, but failed when Co. A & C of the 22nd NYSM charged into the woods, and broke its advance. The rest of the battle played out without much more action for the 36th, save receiving artillery fire. C.H.

It then moved to Western Virginia, then took part in operations in East Tennessee. The 36th was with McCausland at Chambersburg, served with Early in the Shenandoah Valley, and was active around Appomattox. After cutting through the lines at Appomattox, it disbanded. Major James W. Sweeney was in command.

== See also ==
- List of Virginia Civil War units
- List of West Virginia Civil War Confederate units
