= 36th Regiment =

36th Regiment or 36th Infantry Regiment may refer to:

== Infantry regiments ==
- 36th Infantry Regiment (Poland), a unit of the Polish Army
- 36th Sikhs, a unit of the British Indian Army
- 36th (Herefordshire) Regiment of Foot, a former unit of the British Army
- 36th Infantry Regiment (United States), a unit of the United States Army

== Cavalry regiments ==
- 36th Jacob's Horse, a unit of the British Indian Army

== Engineering regiments ==
- 36 Engineer Regiment (United Kingdom), a unit of the British Army's Royal Engineers

== Aviation regiments ==
- 36th Special Aviation Regiment, a unit of the Polish Air Force

== American Civil War regiments ==
- 36th Regiment Alabama Infantry
- 36th Illinois Volunteer Infantry Regiment
- 36th Indiana Infantry Regiment
- 36th New York Infantry
- 36th Ohio Infantry
- 36th Virginia Infantry
- 36th Wisconsin Volunteer Infantry Regiment

== See also ==
- 36 Signal Regiment (disambiguation)
- 36th Division (disambiguation)
- 36th Brigade (disambiguation)
- 36 Squadron (disambiguation)
