= 36 Squadron =

36 Squadron or 36th Squadron may refer to:

- No. 36 Squadron RAF
- No. 36 Squadron RAAF

== United States ==
- 36th Airlift Squadron
- 36th Electronic Warfare Squadron, 36th Bombardment Squadron during World War II
- 36th Fighter Squadron
- 36th Intelligence Squadron
- 36th Reconnaissance Squadron (Heavy)
- 36th Rescue Squadron

== See also ==
- 36th Wing
