= Valley of Flowers (film) =

- Directed by: Pan Nalin
- Written by: Pan Nalin; Sarah Besan Shennib; Anurag Kashyap
- Starring: Milind Soman; Mylene Jampanoi; Naseeruddin Shah; Jampa Kalsang Tamang; Anil Yadav; Eri
- Music by: Cyril Morin
- Production companies: Monsoon Films / Wonderworks; TF1 International; TPS Star; FilmCooperative; Pandora Film Verleih; Diaphana Distribution
- Release date: 15 July 2006 (Osian's-Cinefan Festival of Asian Cinema)
- Running time: 155 minutes
- Countries: French; Germany; Indian
- Languages: Hindi; Japanese

Valley of Flowers (French: La Vallée des fleurs) is a 2006 French-German-Indian independent film directed by Indian director Pan Nalin starring Indian actors Milind Soman, Naseeruddin Shah and French actress Mylene Jampanoi in the leading roles.

== Plot ==
A gang of bandits and their leader Jalan (Milind Soman) have chosen to live an independent life free from oppression in the wilderness and survive by plundering Silk Route travelers. They have their own rules and sense of self-righteousness. While divesting victims of their valuables one day, they come across a demonic mask which intrigues Jalan. The bandits are suddenly caught unaware by the approach of a woman who calls herself Ushna (Mylene Jampanoi) who claims to know Jalan, having seen him in her dreams and asks him to let her come along. Jalan, in spite of his companions' warnings includes the woman in their band as he is already mesmerized by her beauty and mysterious aura.

Ushna, at first becomes the group's muse and the mode of satiating Jalan's desire, but on their first encounter itself, Jalan falls in love with her and the two begin to share an insatiable passion and more than material longing for each other. Ushna knows much more than the bandits about the landscape and strategic points and helps the men in more than one successful heist, becoming Jalan's consort. She proves to be an excellent horse rider, riding alongside Jalan, claims to have seen the ocean, which is unseen and a subject of myth to the men. She also apparently does not have a navel which Jalan calls "The Centre of the Universe". Jalan grows increasingly dependent upon her, their love and passion ascending unscalable heights.

Madly in love, they decide to find out what future has in store for them and visit an astrologer, who informs them that they are not destined to be united. Rejecting this denial, they decide to change their fate and thereby leave the realms of material thefts and direct their attention towards stealing taboo elements such as Fortune and Energy from people potentially rich in them by stealing their shadows, in the attempt to improve their own fate. They explore too far into stealing things "which they have no right to and which are not theirs" and divest a meditating Yogi of his power of Levitation. Jalan and Ushna unite making use of their newly acquired power, to rise in the air during the act which is witnessed by Jalan's group member Jampa La (Jampa Kalsang Tamang). This is followed by a major fallout between Jalan and the rest of the group who accuse Jalan of breaking the group's rules as they perceive Ushna to be a superhuman and hence a precious asset, which according to the rules of the group should be equally divided. This enrages Jalan who accidentally kills Jampa La in the fracas between the two which results in a final split of Jalan and Ushna with the rest, with Hak Chi (Anil Yadav) rebuking Jalan as they part ways.

Meanwhile, the merchants and travelers, seek the help of Yeti (Naseeruddin Shah), a mysterious wise man and the local protector, for protection against Jalan's group. Yeti seems to recognize Ushna at once from the description given by the victims and immediately sets out for the pair of them with his three bounty hunters. Ushna and Jalan make a narrow escape, until finally they are outsmarted by Yeti and his men. Ushna manages to escape on horseback and Jalan falls into the river. Later, Yeti is confronted by Ushna in his tent who questions him of Jalan's whereabouts. Yeti advises her to go back to where she came from as she can never unite with Jalan because of what she is. Ushna rejects this denial a second time saying she loves him too much and that she never does what she is supposed to and vanishes from sight as Yeti begins to gather his Chöd equipment's to capture her.

After this short separation, Ushna succeeds in finding Jalan at a monastery recovering from his wounds. The two set off for another monastery Jalan has heard of during his stay at the former one, where the Yogi prepares the Elixir of life for immortality by extracting the breath out of his pupils. Ushna is a bit reluctant and wishes to spend their lives in their natural spans together at the Valley of Flowers, where nobody could separate them. They however manage to steal the Elixir and consume it, preserving some for "days to come". The unfortunate lovers are confronted by Yeti early next morning direct from their sleep and Jalan in his pride of them attaining immortality shoots Ushna to make a display of it and Ushna in spite of having taken the Elixir is killed. Jalan is rebuked by Yeti for having tampered with things they ought not have. Now bereaved from his soulmate, Jalan is doomed to a vain life of immortality.

Then follows a transition of two centuries into the modern times in Tokyo. The shifting of landscapes and ages is depicted by the famous Time-Walk scene as Jalan's feet are shown to traverse diverse landscapes from rocky wildernesses to blooming pastures to war ridden lands strewn with havoc to modern metaled roads, accompanied by sounds describing the various ages in time.

In Japan, Jalan goes by the identity Jalan Otsal, the controversial Indian doctor who is a legalized practitioner of euthanasia and owner of the firm Valley of Flowers Corporation. He is despised by the people of the city and is stalked everywhere by protesters demanding him to leave Japan and leave death to Nature. Jalan creates news again by jumping from the 62-storey and yet surviving without even a scar, which is telecast live in the local news channels. Sayuri (Eri), the reincarnation of Ushna in this age, who is a singer at a pub is stopped during a performance by this telecast going on in the pub's television and she immediately rushes to the Police Station to rescue Jalan. They board a subway train where she tells Jalan that she has been serving her Karma ever since, this is her fifth reincarnation and that she has remembered him in each one of them, right from her birth, with the pain of separation and her aeonian longing living on with her soul and finally now she can't stand it anymore. Jalan and Sayuri unite in the empty train and rush to a temple where he gives her the Elixir he had preserved earlier. In the morning they wake up to find Yeti who reminds them of the Laws of Karma and Impermanence and of the Buddha, "the one who can turn conflict into collaboration" and gives Jalan the symbolic White Flower. Sayuri starts to flee taking Jalan with her but they are hit by a flower delivery truck. This time Jalan is killed, and his body is shown lying amid the flowers fallen from the truck. Sayuri rushes to Yeti in anguish and demands to know why he did this when he had promised her more time with Jalan. Yeti consoles her saying that true love lies in sacrifice. He says that he is just carrying out his duty to restore the balance. Sayuri breaks down at his feet and slowly dissolves in a sea of fumes. Yeti performs the symbolic Chöd rituals of parting by playing the Damaru and blowing the Kangling. He then retrieves the Demon mask which Jalan had found earlier in the movie when Ushna had appeared, from where Sayuri dissolved into fumes.

== Cast ==
- Milind Soman : Jalan
- Mylène Jampanoï : Ushna
- Naseeruddin Shah : Yeti
- Eri : Sayuri
- Kelsang Jampa Tamang : Jampa La
- Anil Yadav : Hak Chi

Nomads living in Ladakh play bandits in the film.

== Reception ==
A writer for Frontline wrote that "The opening film Valley of Flowers by Pan Nalin, who also served as a jury member at Cinefan, had breathtaking mountainscapes as in his earlier Sam- sara". A writer from India Today wrote that the film was "lush but disappointing period period wanna - epic". A critic from IANS wrote that "The opening film at the eighth Osian Cinefan Festival Of Asian Cinema, "Valley Of Flowers" fails to carry the audience with it. Though Milind and Mylene give it their best shot, in the final cut, the film sinks in its own question marks".

== Soundtrack ==
Track Listing

1 Ushna and Jalan (2:50)

2 The journey (1:44)

3 Ushna (2:59)

4 The Search (0:59)

5 Yeti (3:31)

6 Mountain Song (1:51)

7 The Gang (2:10)

8 The Chase (2:17)

9 Center of the Universe (2:13)

10 Nothing Lasts Forever (1:08)

11 Looking for Jalan (4:29)

12 Valley of Silence (2:56)

13 Mystery (2:03)10)

14 Demon's Hunt (1:10)

15 Love and Longing (1:13)

16 Not a Good Omen (1:35)

17 Together Again (2:18)

18 Travelling Beyond (1:08)

19 Magic Shadows (3:02)

20 Love Theme (5:08)

21 Bardo: Book of the Dead (3:33)

22 Ocean in the Bottle (5:19)

23 Valley of Flowers (End Title) (1:20)

Total Duration: 56:56

== See also ==
- Christy Chung
- Milarepa
- Samsara
- Shawn Ku
