= Chemrey Monastery =

Buddhist monastery in India

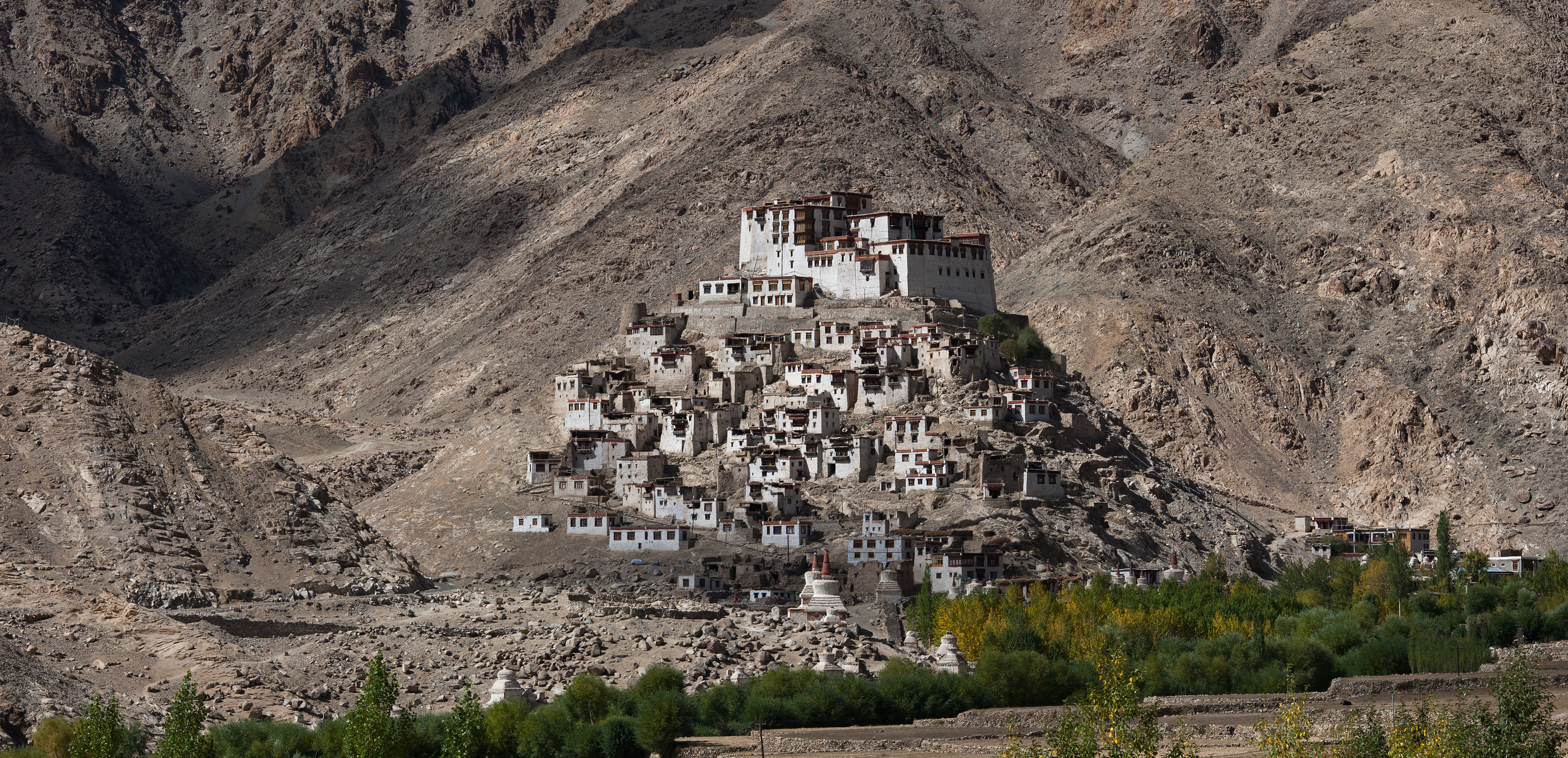

- Location within India

Religion
- Affiliation: Tibetan Buddhism
- Sect: Drukpa
- Deity: Sengge Namgyal
- Festivals: Sacred Dances - 28th and 29th day of the 9th month

Location
- Location: Ladakh, India
- Coordinates: 33°58′N 77°48′E

Architecture
- Founder: Tagsang Raschen
- Established: 1664; 362 years ago

Chemrey Monastery or Chemrey Gompa in Indus River valley is a 1664 Buddhist monastery in Leh district of Ladakh in northern India. It is 6 kilometres (3.7 mi) north of Hemis Monastery, 46 kilometres (29 mi) southeast of Leh and 24 kilometres (15 mi) northwest of Upshi. It belongs to the Drugpa monastic order. It was founded in 1664 by the Lama Tagsang Raschen and dedicated to King Sengge Namgyal.

The monastery comprises a number of shrines, two assembly halls (Du-Khang) and a Lama temple (Lha-Khang). The main attraction of the monastery is the one storey high statue of Padmasambhava. Another big attraction is its collection of 29 volumes of scripture written in silver and golden letters.

The monastery holds every year the Chemrey Angchok festival of sacred dances.

The international film Samsara (2001) shot its monastic scenes at Chemrey.

== Gallery ==
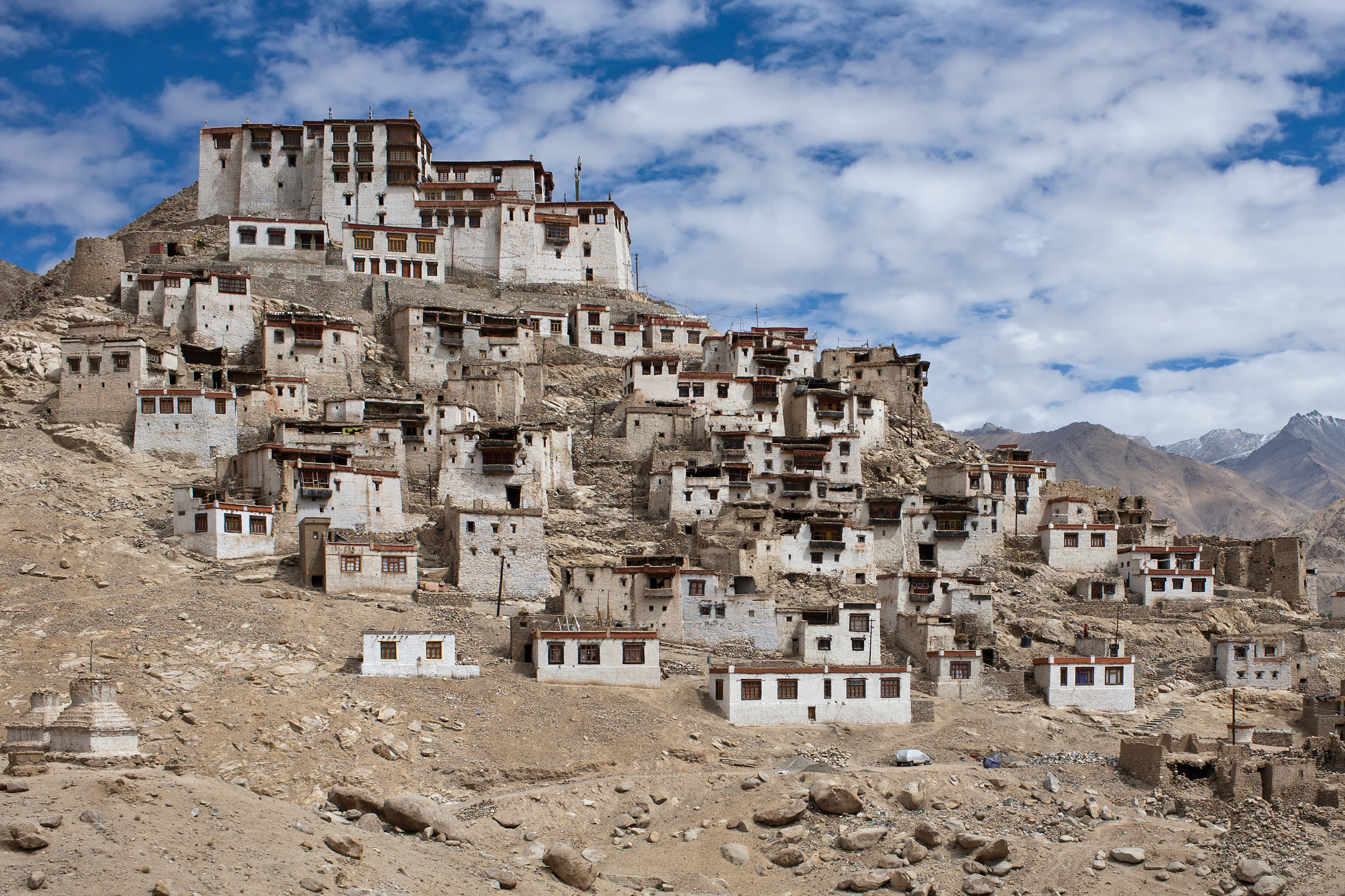
Chemrey Gompa viewed from the southwest

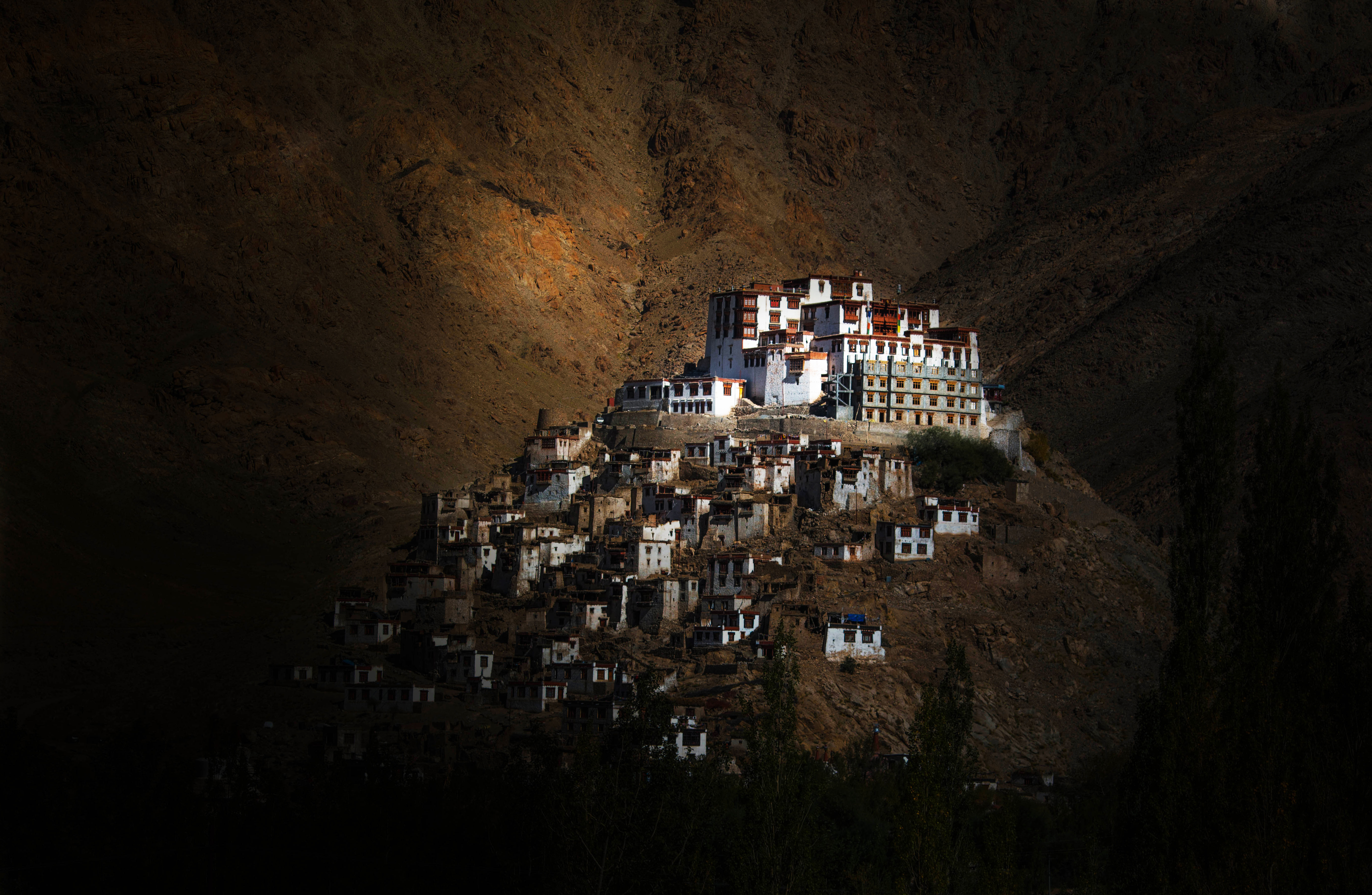
Chemrey Monastery

== See also ==
- List of buddhist monasteries in Ladakh
- Tourism in Ladakh
