= Last Film Show =

- Official poster
- Directed by: Pan Nalin
- Written by: Pan Nalin
- Produced by: Pan Nalin; Dheer Momaya; Siddharth Roy Kapur; Marc Duale
- Starring: Bhavin Rabari; Bhavesh Shrimali; Richa Meena; Dipen Raval; Paresh Mehta
- Cinematography: Swapnil S. Sonawane
- Edited by: Shreyas Beltangdy; Pavan Bhat
- Music by: Cyril Morin
- Production companies: Jugaad Motion Pictures; Monsoon Films; Stranger 88; Film Heritage Foundation; Virginie Films; Incognito Films; NFDC; Chhello Show LLP
- Distributed by: Samuel Goldwyn Films; Roy Kapur Films; PVR Pictures
- Release dates: 10 June 2021 (Tribeca); 14 October 2022 (India)
- Running time: 110 minutes
- Country: India
- Language: Gujarati

Last Film Show, also known as Chhello Show, is a 2021 Indian Gujarati-language coming-of-age drama film directed by Pan Nalin. It stars Bhavin Rabari, Bhavesh Shrimali, Richa Meena, Dipen Raval and Paresh Mehta. The film premiered at the 20th Tribeca Film Festival on 10 June 2021 and was theatrically released in India on 14 October 2022.

This film was selected as the Indian entry for the Best International Feature Film at the 95th Academy Awards, and subsequently got Shortlisted in the category.

== Plot ==
Nine-year-old Samay (Bhavin Rabari) from Chalala, a village in Saurashtra, Gujarat, India spends an entire summer watching films, from the projection booth of a rundown movie place, by bribing the projectionist - Fazal (Bhavesh Shrimali). He is absolutely mesmerized by films and filmmaking, to the point that he decides to become a filmmaker, unaware of the heartbreaking times that await him.

== Cast ==
- Bhavin Rabari as Samay
- Bhavesh Shrimali as Fazal, Projectionist
- Richa Meena as Baa, Samay's mother
- Dipen Raval as Bapuji, Samay's father
- Paresh Mehta as Cinema manager
- Vikas Bata as Nano
- Rahul Koli as Manu
- Shoban Makwa as Badshah
- Kishan Parmar as ST
- Vijay Mer as Tiku
- Alpesh Tank as Mr. Dave, Teacher
- Tia Sebastien as Leela Mila
- Jasmin Joshi as Rathor

== Production ==
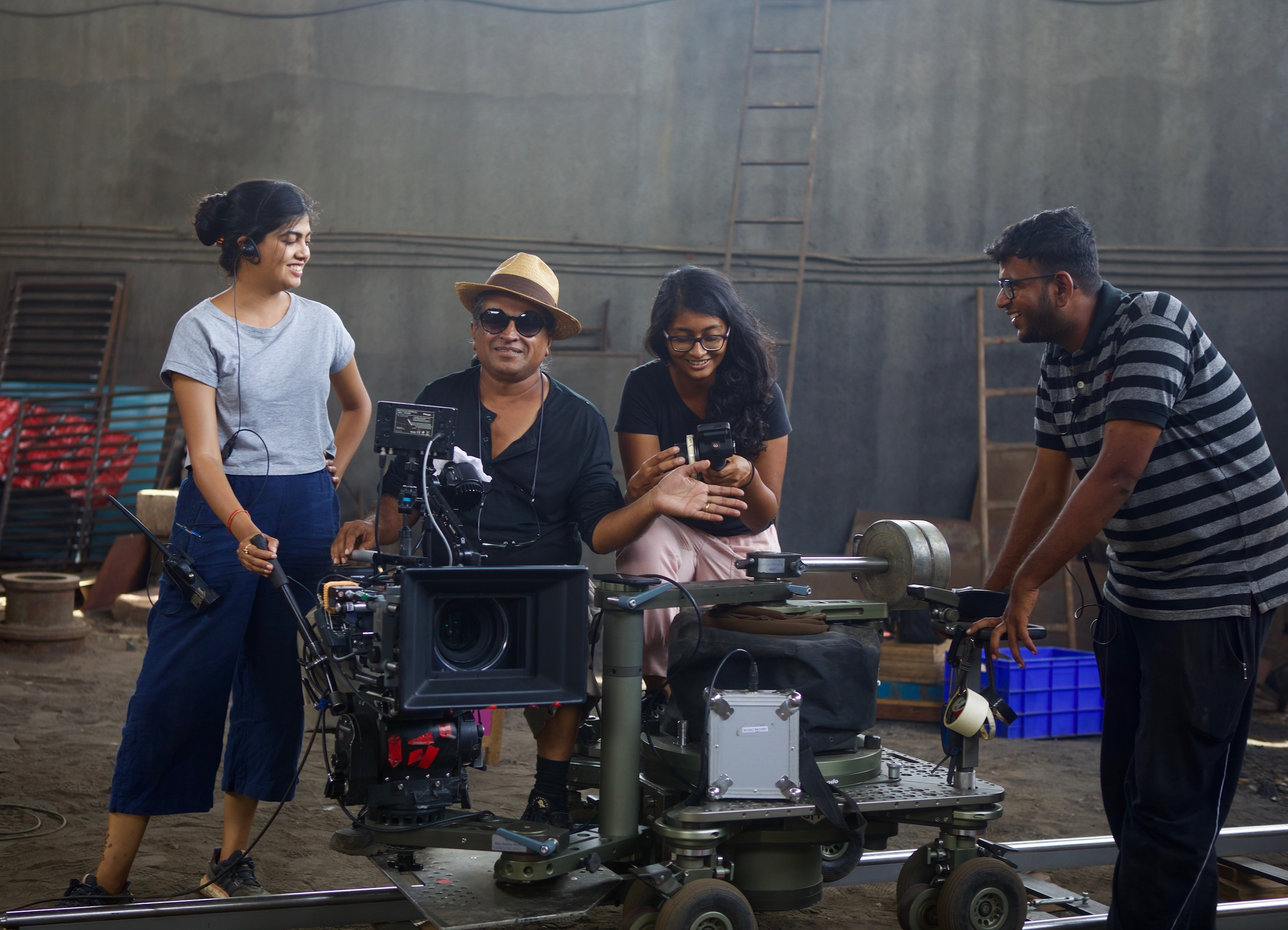
Pan Nalin on the shoot of Last Film Show in Rajkot, Gujarat, India in 2019

The film is semi-autobiographical as Nalin was born and brought up in Adtala village in Saurashtra. Six village boys from local communities of the region were cast. The film was shot in villages and railway station in Saurashtra. He also brought old celluloid Hindi films and a technician to run projectors. The cast is mostly made of child actors. Dilip Shankar, Nalin's friend and casting director, assisted Nalin in casting the child actors. The film was shot in March 2020, just before the COVID-19 pandemic lockdown in India. The post-production was completed during the pandemic. The film is produced by Dheer Momaya's Jugaad Motion Pictures, Nalin's Monsoon Films and Marc Duale's Stranger88 in co-production with Virginie Lacombe's Virginie Films and Eric Dupont's Incognito films.

The film focuses on hope and innocence. It also highlight ending culture of single-screen cinema and 35mm celluloid films in India.

== Release ==
Ahead of its premiere, the film was acquired by Neue Visionen for Germany, Karma Films for Spain, Shochiku for Japan, Red Cape and Nachson for Israel and Nos Lusomundo for Portugal.

The film premiered at the Spotlight section of the 20th Tribeca Festival on 10 June 2021. It was the first Gujarati film that was selected for this section of the festival.

More than a year after its premiere at Tribeca, Siddharth Roy Kapur's Roy Kapur Films acquired the rights to present and distribute Last Film Show in its home country of India, in partnership with PVR Pictures, the motion picture distribution arm of PVR Cinemas. The film was theatrically released in Gujarat and on screens across India on 14 October 2022.

== Reception ==
=== India ===
On the review aggregator website Rotten Tomatoes, 94% of 16 critics' reviews are positive, with an average rating of 7.7/10. Prahlad Srihari of Firstpost called the film "an ode to movie-going, as movie-making". Tanzeem Pardiwalla of Mashable India rated it 5 out of 5, praising its direction, cinematography, theme, story and performances. Saibal Chatterjee of NDTV gave it 4 out of 5 stars and called it "a gem that is both rooted and universal". Shwetha Kesari of India Today gave it a 4 out of 5 stars and praised it for its performances and cinematography. Nandini Oza of The Week rated the film 4 out of 5 stars and said that "Human relations have been captured beautifully". Pratikshya Mishra of The Quint and wrote "Chhello Show is a reminder of what happens when film evolves into cinema". Deepa Gahlot of Rediff.com rated the film 3.5 out of 5 stars and wrote, "The film pays tribute to the tribe that cannot imagine cinema being anything but a large screen experience in a dark hall. And no rewind or fast forward button".

Firstpost's Anna M. M. Vetticad rated it 3/5 and compared it to Cinema Paradiso stating that "Chhello Show is slender in comparison, but works all the same as an enchanting, bitter-sweet reminiscence". Shubhra Gupta of The Indian Express gave the film 2.5 out of 5 stars and wrote that "it has a familiar problem, and that is the gaze through which some elements are turned exotic or too-pretty." Bhuvanesh Chandar of The Hindu praised the film for theme, story, cinematography, direction and performances.

=== International ===
Richard Whittaker of The Austin Chronicle said that the film was "as visually intoxicating as it was thematically rich". David Ehrlich of IndieWire gave the film a B+, calling it "an ethereal take on the magic of movies".

== Accolades ==
The film was nominated for the Audience Award in the Narrative section at the 20th Tribeca Festival, held from 9 to 20 June 2021. It was nominated for the Tiantan Awards at the 11th Beijing International Film Festival. It won the Audience Award at the World Cinema section of the 44th Mill Valley Film Festival, held from 7 to 17 October 2021. It won the Golden Spike Award for the Best Picture at the 66th Valladolid International Film Festival (Seminci), held from 22 to 29 October 2021. It was nominated for the Best Feature Film - Avante-Garde and Genre at the 23rd Buenos Aires International Festival of Independent Cinema, held from 20 April to 1 May 2022. It won the Luminaries Jury Award - Special Mention at 14th Milwaukee Film Festival, held from 21 April to 5 May 2022.

At the 69th National Film Awards announced in August 2023 the film won two awards - "Best Feature Film in Gujarati" and "Best Child Artist" for Bhavin Rabari.

== See also ==
- List of submissions to the 95th Academy Awards for Best International Feature Film
- List of Indian submissions for the Academy Award for Best International Feature Film
