= Pan Nalin =

Indian film director

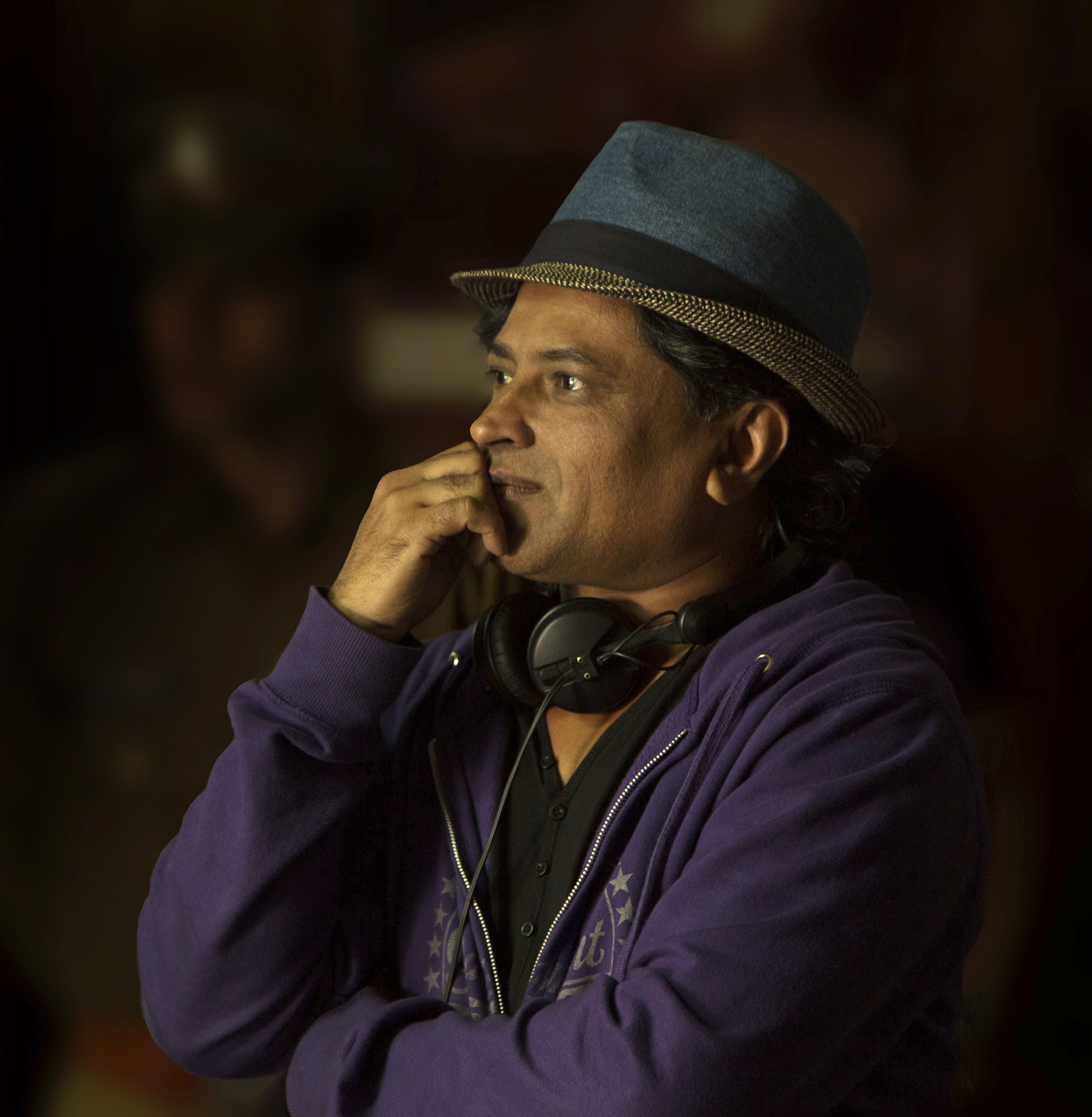
- Pan Nalin in 2014 on the set of Angry Indian Goddesses Film in Goa
- Born: Nalinkumar Ramniklal Pandya; Adtala, Amreli district, Gujarat, India
- Education: National Institute of Design, Ahmedabad
- Occupations: Film director; Film producer; Screenwriter; Production designer; Editor
- Years active: 1990–present
- Style: Drama, Action, Western, Comedy, Spiritual

Nalin Kumar Pandya, popularly known as Pan Nalin, is an Indian filmmaker, best known for directing award-winning movies like Samsara (2001), Valley of Flowers (2006), Angry Indian Goddesses (2015) and the semi-autobiographical Chhello Show (translation: Last Film Show) (2021). His debut feature Samsara (Miramax) was worldwide critical and commercial triumph and went on to win awards like Best First Feature Film at Durban International Film Festival, "Grand Jury Prize – Special Mention" at AFI Fest, Special Jury Award at Santa Barbara International Film Festival and "Most Popular Feature Film" at Melbourne International Film Festival in 2002. Since then Nalin has been actively making fiction and non-fiction movies which have been coproduced with countries like India, France, Germany, Italy, Japan, and the USA. Nalin's movies have been distributed worldwide.

== Early life ==
Nalin, a self-taught filmmaker, was born in a remote village of Adtala in Amreli district, Gujarat, India. Nalin, until the age of 12, helped his father sell tea on a railway platform Khijadiya Junction Railway Station. His parents gave him spiritual upbringing. As a child, Nalin disliked schools; instead he used to paint and draw. He also actively staged mythological dramas and folk plays.

Nalin left his family in young age in pursuit of cinema. He studied Fine Arts at the M.S. University, Baroda for one year. It is also in Vadodara that Nalin discovered Hollywood movies and World Cinema. A year later Nalin went to study design at the NID (National Institute of Design, Ahmedabad). While at NID, he wrote about movies and managed the Film Club by programming films from around the world. Nalin made some fifty wedding videos to finance his education and filmmaking. From Ahmedabad's famous Sunday Flea Market Nalin found the old film cameras. He made four animations and twenty short silent films using these cameras. However having no means to finance the editing, sound and lab work, those films remained incomplete, some disappeared all together. After graduating from NID, Nalin traveled widely all over India for the next two years.

== Career ==
=== 1990 to 2000 ===
Nalin finally moved to Mumbai, and became a production runner at Durga Khote Productions. Soon the producers recognized Nalin's talent and offered him a chance to direct commercials and corporate films. In 1988, Nalin conceived a unique comedy TV series of Doordarshan in collaboration with famous cartoonist R. K. Laxman; the series was later sold and became a major hit under the title of Wagle Ki Duniya.

Nalin traveled and lived in USA and UK for about a year and then six months in Europe. He soon returned to India and started writing screenplays and making documentaries. Nalin made several of them with Discovery, Canal Plus, BBC and other leading international TV networks. Nalin also made short documentaries for Canal Plus on Indian superstars Shah Rukh Khan and Sridevi. The subjects of his documentaries ranged from modern India to deep interiors of Nagaland to High Tibetan plateau of the Himalayas. Nalin's independent moviemaking spirit attracted French documentary filmmaker Yolande Zauberman’s attention; so while she was making her feature documentary Born Criminal in India, Nalin shifted his career gears by becoming co-producer on the movie because he was highly impressed by Zauberman’s style of moviemaking. "Born Criminal" became Official Selection of Cannes Film Festival where Nalin was invited.

Nalin started 'Monsoon Films', his own production company in Delhi, which was later, moved to Mumbai.

=== 2000s: Breakthrough ===
Nalin got a breakthrough with Cinematheque in Paris, where his documentary "Sacred Courtesan Devadasi" and his short fiction "Khajuraho" was being showcased, in the audience was Europe's prolific producer Karl Baumgartner.

After 170 rejection letters and emails for Samsara, Nalin met Baumgartner who came on board as main producer and mounted Samsara in co-production with Germany, France, Italy and India. In 2000, Samsara was done in a four-month-long pre-production, followed by a three-month-long filming. There were fourteen nationalities in Samsara's cast and crew. Samsara was invited to Toronto International Film Festival to make the world premiere, Miramax and fifty other distributors acquired the movie for the distribution. The film won Jury and audience award at Santa Barbara International Film Festival. Pan Nalin came into global limelight; SAMSARA became a massive commercial and critical success worldwide and won him many international awards.

== 2001-2020: Established auteur ==
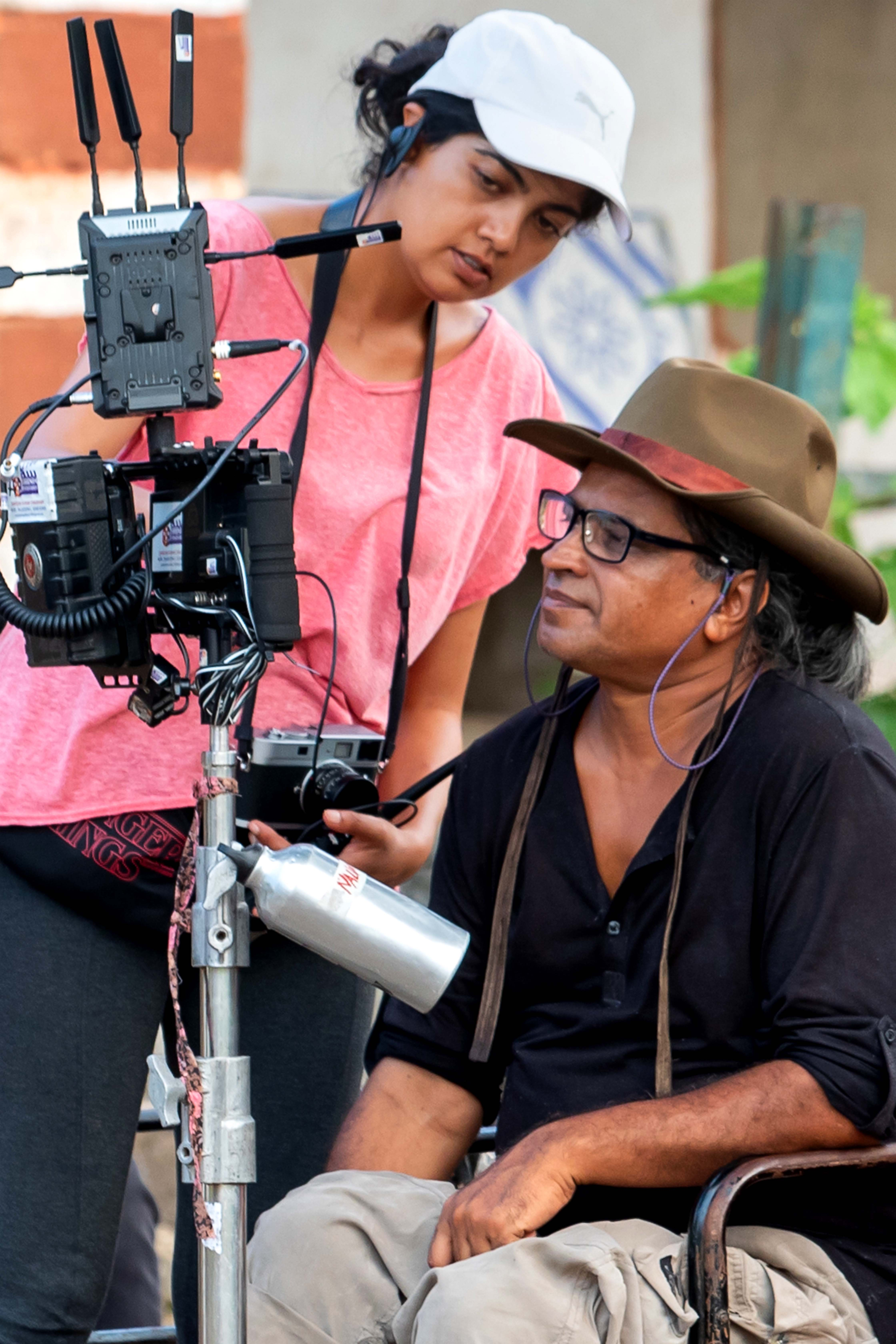
Pan Nalin in 2017 on the set of "Beyond The Known World" in Manali, India

Following theatrical success of "Samsara", Nalin traveled 15000 km by road to meet with traditional masters of Indian medicine. The result was a documentary "AYURVEDA: ART OF BEING". It was theatrically released worldwide with major success. "AYURVEDA: ART OF BEING" celebrated a yearlong theatrical run in Spain and record-breaking two-year long run in France. The film met with similar success in USA, Canada, Germany and Holland.

In 2006, Nalin's Hindi and Japanese language second feature, Valley of Flowers was pre-sold to nearly 35 countries and considered a major underground hit. The Valley of Flowers was filmed in remote, high altitude Himalayas and in Japan. The film won the best picture at Indian Film Festival of Los Angeles, and four nominations at IAAC New York, including The Best Picture and The Best Director.

For his next documentary Nalin traveled to Kumbh Mela in 2013, one of the world's most extraordinary religious events. There, he directed Faith Connections. This film was an official selection at Toronto (2013), won the Audience Choice Award at Indian Film Festival of Los Angeles (2014) and it has been theatrically released worldwide.

In 2014, Pan Nalin made India's first female buddy Film, Angry Indian Goddesses. The film became a hit. The film won Audience Choice Award First-Runner-up at the 2015 Toronto International Film Festival. The film also won Audience Award at the Rome Film Festival and nominated for All Lights India International Film Festival in 2016. It was followed up by another In 2017 it launched on streaming platform Netflix.

== 2021- ==
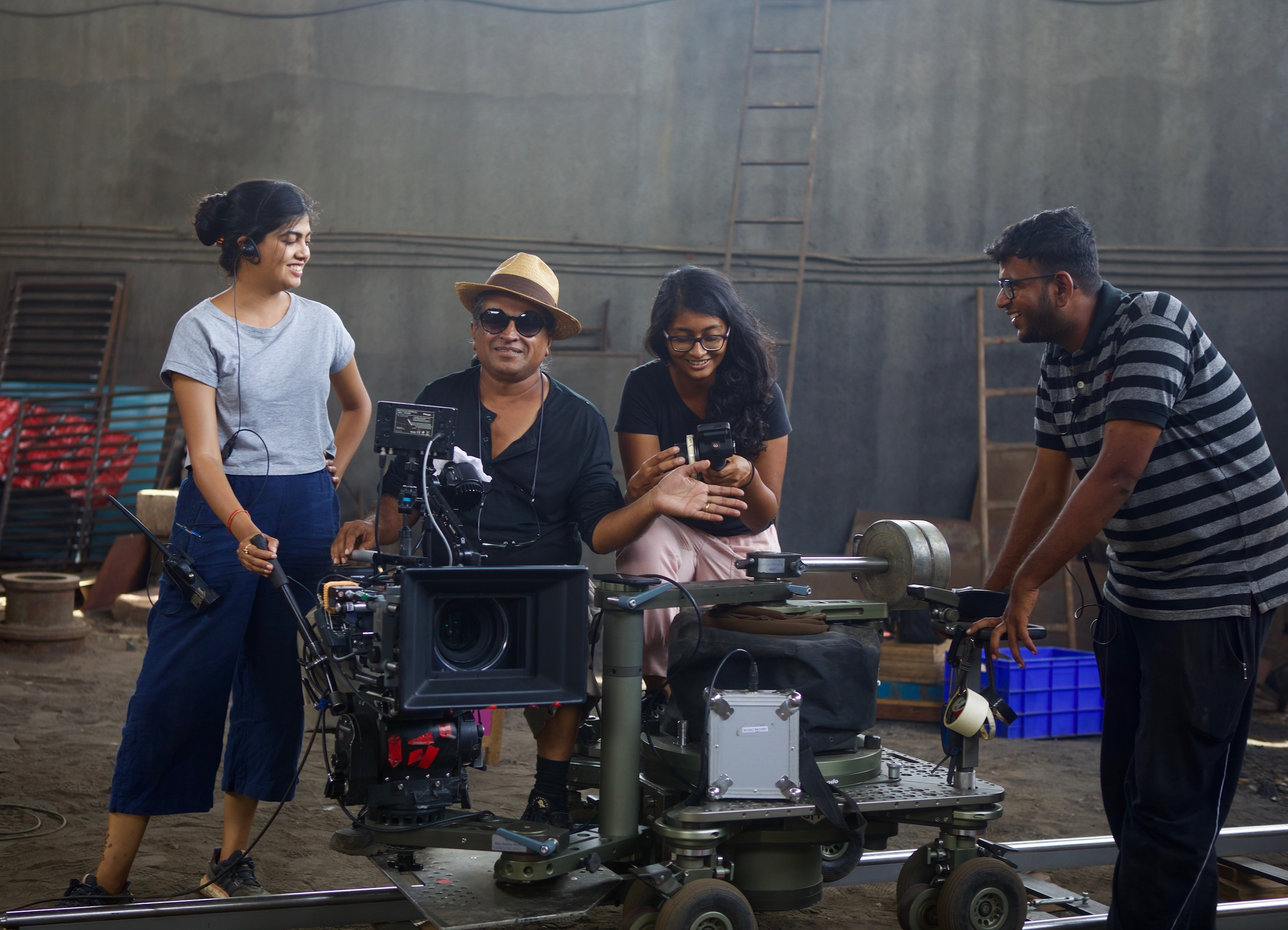
Pan Nalin in 2019 on the shoot of Chhello Show in Rajkot, Gujarat, India

In 2021, Nalin wrote, directed, and produced the semi-autobiographical Chhello Show (Last Film Show), a Gujarati film. The film premiered at the Tribeca Film Festival in June 2021. Where it went on to win Audience Award First Runner-Up. The film also won the Best Picture, Golden Spike Award, at the Seminci 66th Valladolid International Film Festival 2021 in Spain, won Audience Favorite Award at the Mill Valley Film Festival 2021, and was nominated for Best Picture at Tiantan Award 2021 in China. The last Film Show will be released worldwide in theaters in 2022. The Last Film Show was selected as India's official entry to the 2023 Oscars on 20 September 2022.

== Artistic style and themes ==
The spiritual longing of Tarkovsky movies, high voltage actions of Kurosawa, and versatile styling of Kubrick and Sergio Leone were some of the early influences on Pan Nalin's work. He believed that each story or screenplay is born with its own natural cinematic style, and Stanley Kubrick and Sergio Leone proved it with each and every movie they made.

Nalin finds the story, looks for its natural and organic cinematic style. For example, Samsara and Angry Indian Goddesses are totally opposite in cinematic styling. Samsara was conceived with almost every frame storyboarded and composed by Nalin, actors were restricted to respect that and were not allowed even the slightest of improvisation. Nalin made a small book for the cast and crew, “Notes on Zenematography.” Angry Indian Goddesses is the opposite with its handheld cinematography actors were given the freedom to improve and go in and out of frame as they please. Not only that, Angry Indian Goddesses was a scriptless production.

Visual and sound design play a big role in Nalin's movies, and he often spends months doing sound ‘recce.’ Nalin created a distinct style in Samsara with the use of specially designed color palettes and camera moves. In the film Samsara, There are no greens or chirping birds. Mainly barren landscapes with cold wind and fluttering prayer flags. Tashi only sees one single green leaf when he steps out of the cave after three years of meditation.

With Valley of Flowers Nalin made an attempt to create an Asian love story, free of western influences. The film is inspired by Buddhist mythology and Tantric traditions. Valley of Flowers story commences in the early 19th century in high-altitude Himalayas and ends in modern-day Tokyo. Nalin has described it as an ‘Eastern.’ The film has a different perspective on the topic of “true love conquers all” from the rationale of a different culture.

== Awards ==
- 2021 Valladolid International Film Festival Won, Golden Spike Best Film for Last Film Show
- 2021 Mill Valley Film Festival Won, Audience Award World Cinema for Last Film Show
- 2021 Tribeca Film Festival 2nd place, Audience Award Narrative for Last Film Show
- 2021 Beijing International Film Festival Nominated, Tiantian Award Best Film for Last Film Show
- 2016 Audience Award Inside Out Film and Video Festival (Won) for Best Feature for Angry Indian Goddesses (2015)
- 2015 BNL People's Choice Award at Rome Film Festival (Won) for Best Film Angry Indian Goddesses (2015)
- 2015 People's Choice Award at Toronto International Film Festival (Won)
- 2014 Audience Award at Indian Film Festival of Los Angeles (Won) for Best Documentary for "Faith Connections (2013)"
- 2007 Jury Award at Indian Film Festival of Los Angeles (Won) for Best Feature for Valley of Flowers 2006
- 2003 Durban International Film Festival (Won), Best First Feature Film Samsara (2001 film)
- 2003 Galway Film Fleadh (Nominated) for Best Feature for Samsara (2001 film)
- 2003 Indian Film Festival of Los Angeles (Won), Audience Award for Best Documentary for Ayurveda: Art of Being (2001)
- 2003 Santa Barbara International Film Festival (Won), Special Jury Award for Samsara (2001 film)
- 2002 Galway Film Fleadh (Won), for Samsara (2001 film)
- 2002 Melbourne International Film Festival (Won), Most Popular Feature Film Samsara (2001 film)
- 2002 São Paulo International Film Festival (Nominated), Jury Award for Best Feature Film Samsara (2001 film)
- In 2023, The Nalin received 69th National Film Awards for his film Chhello Show in the category 'Best Gujarati film'.

== Filmography ==
- 1991 The Khajuraho (short)
- 1992 Born Criminal (Caste Criminelle), a film by Yolande Zauberman (Coproducer)
- 1993 The Tulkus (documentary)
- 1994 The Nagas (documentary)
- 1995 The Doubt (short)
- 1996 Kaal, a film by Natasha De Betak (as Producer)
- 1997 The Devadasi (documentary)
- 1997 Dance of the Wind, a film by Rajan Khosa (as Co-producer)
- 1997 Eiffel Tower Trilogy: Height, Weight & Gravity (short)
- 1999 Amazing World India (documentary)
- 2001 Samsara
- 2001 Ayurveda: Art of Being (documentary)
- 2004 Speaking Tree, a film by Natasha De Betak (as Producer)
- 2006 Valley of Flowers
- 2009 Echo of Eco (short)
- 2013 Faith Connections (documentary)
- 2015 Angry Indian Goddesses
- 2016 2183 DAYS, a film by Natasha De Betak (as Producer)
- 2017 Beyond The Known World (The Disappearance of Eva Hansen)
- 2020 The Tiniest Invisible Piece of Shit (Short)
- 2021 Last Film Show (Chhello Show)

== See also ==
- Parallel Cinema
