= Samsara (2001 film) =

2001 film by Pan Nalin

- Promotional release poster
- Directed by: Pan Nalin
- Written by: Pan Nalin; Tim Baker
- Starring: Shawn Ku; Christy Chung; Neelesha BaVora
- Music by: Cyril Morin; Dadon
- Production companies: Fandango; Ocean Films Distribution; Pandora Film; Paradis Films
- Distributed by: Ocean Films (France); Fandango (Italy)
- Release date: 2001
- Running time: 138 minutes
- Countries: India; Germany; France; Italy; Switzerland
- Languages: Tibetan; Ladakhi

Samsara is a 2001 independent film directed and co-written by Pan Nalin. An international co-production of India, Germany, France, Italy, and Switzerland, the film tells the story of a Buddhist monk's struggles between the monastic life and his sexual desires. It stars Shawn Ku as the monk Tashi and Christy Chung as Pema.

== Plot ==
Tashi began his training as a Buddhist monk at the age of five. Twenty years later, he emerges from a three-year solitary meditation, for which he is awarded the degree of khenpo by the rinpoche. When Tashi begins to have wet dreams, his relationships at the temple become strained. On an official visit, he stays with a farmer and meets Pema, the farmer's daughter. He leaves monastic life, returning to the farm, where he joins the migrant workers for the harvest. After another encounter with Pema, they marry. They later have a son, Karma.

The ex-lama becomes a farmer and landowner, becoming financially successful by bringing the harvest to the city instead of selling to the local merchant Dawa, who cheats the local farmers. This puts him at odds with Jamayang, Pema's former fiancée and local stonemason, who resents Tashi for damaging the long-standing relationship between the people of the valley and Dawa.

Tashi is at odds with his sexuality and an attraction to Sujata, a migrant worker who returns to the farm to labor each year. While Pema goes to the city to sell their harvest, he and Sujata have sex. She tells him that Pema knew that it might happen. His friend from his time as a lama comes to visit, and informs Tashi that their mentor, Apo, has died. Racked with guilt over his infidelity and the death of Apo, Tashi leaves the farm and want to return to the monastery.

The movie ends without confirming if Tashi did return to the monastery.

== Cast ==
- Shawn Ku as Tashi
- Christy Chung as Pema
- Neelesha Barthel as Sujata
- Lhakpa Tsering as Dawa
- Jamayang Jinpa as Sonam

== Production ==
The film's monastic scenes were mainly shot at Chemrey Monastery in Ladakh and the film's cham dance was performed by monks from Chemrey and Hemis monasteries. The film's dialogue uses a mixture of Tibetan and Ladakhi; it also starred a multiethnic cast, including Hoa-Vietnamese actress Christy Chung and Chinese actor Shawn Ku.

== See also ==
- Ladakhi cinema
