= Adtala =

Coordinates: 21.72100505°N 71.2928341°E

Adtala is a village in Lathi Taluka of Amreli district, Gujarat, India. It is about eight miles west of Lathi.

== History ==
The village was under Jetpur State during British period. The population was 2,983 as of 2011.

== Notable people ==
- Pan Nalin, film director
