= Hemis Monastery =

Tibetan Buddhist monastery in Ladakh, India

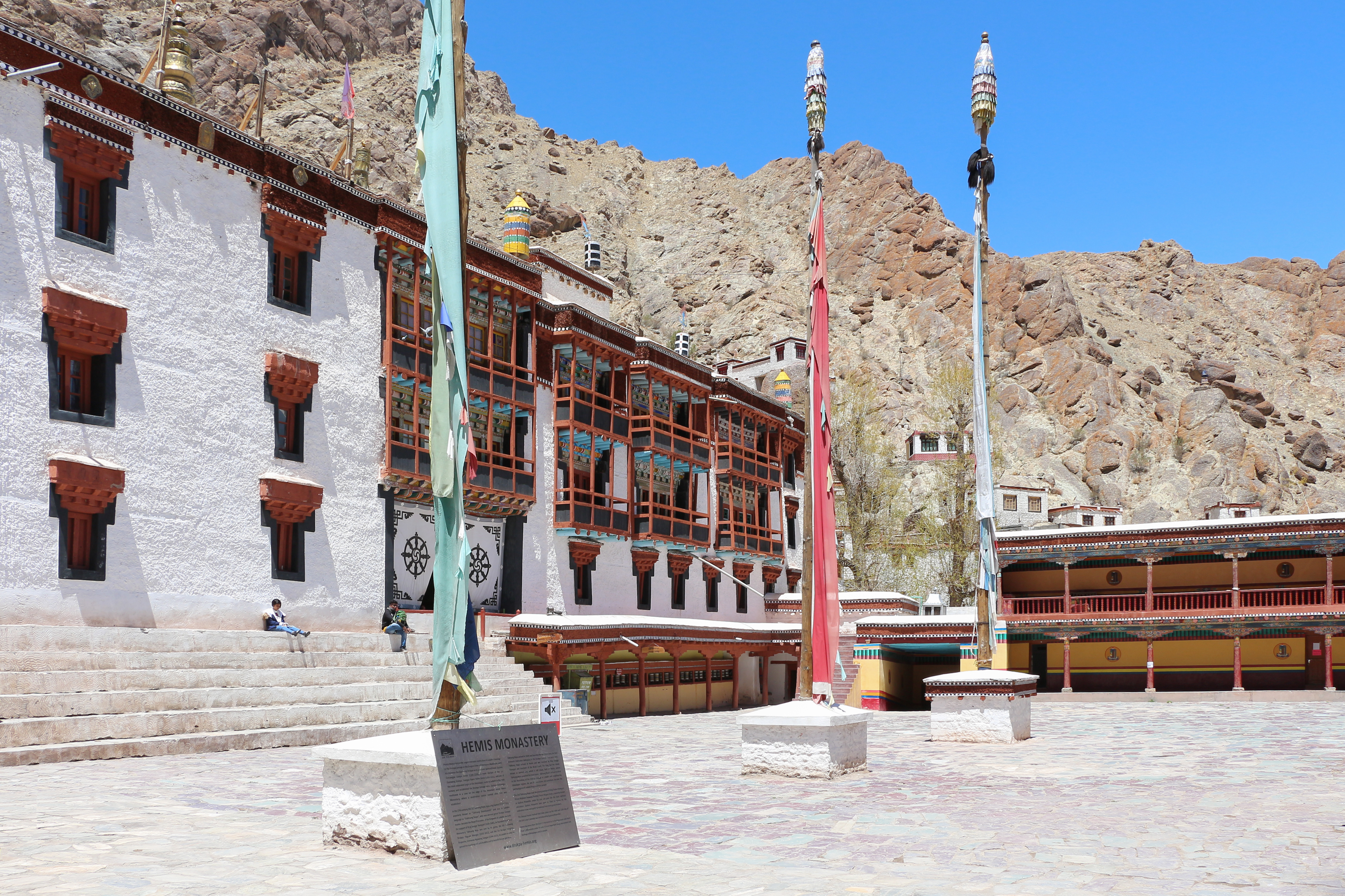
- Hemis Monastery

- Location within Ladakh, India

Religion
- Affiliation: Tibetan Buddhism
- Sect: Drukpa
- Leadership: The Twelfth Gyalwang Drukpa

Location
- Location: Ladakh, India
- Country: India
- Interactive map of Hemis Monastery
- Coordinates: 33°54′44.91″N 77°42′10.2″E

Architecture
- Style: Dzong
- Founder: Sengge Namgyal
- Established: 11th century

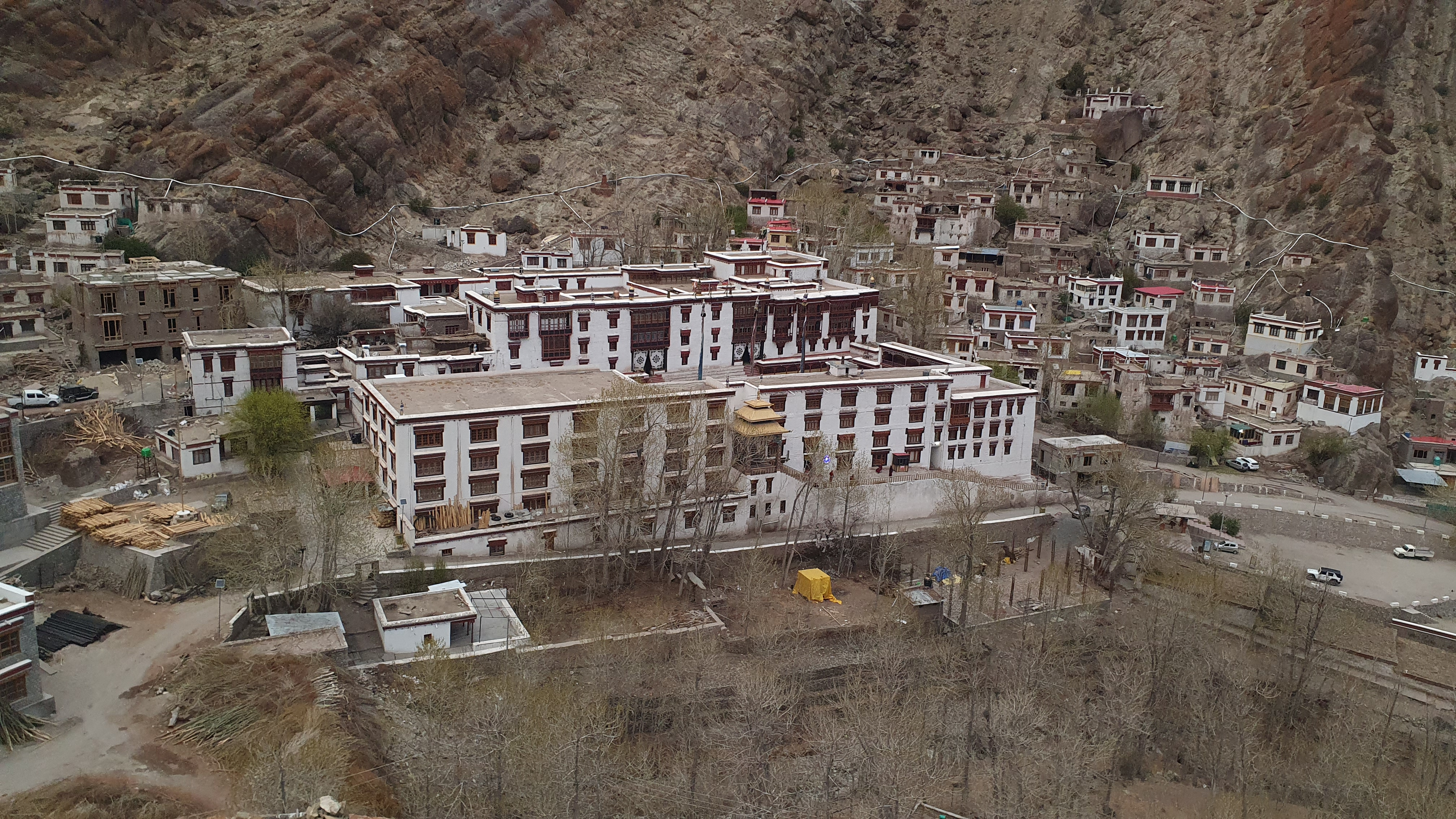
Hemis monastery serves as the principal seat of Drukpa Kagyu lineage of Tibetan Buddhism.

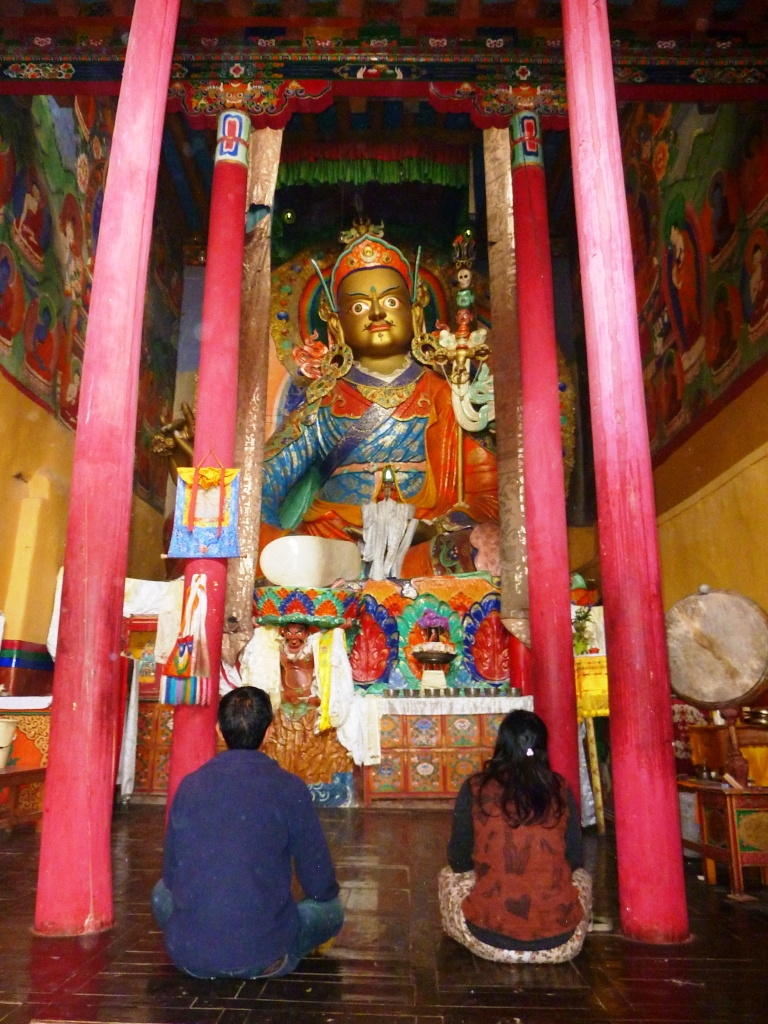
Statue of Guru Rinpoche (Padmasambhava) and pilgrims at Hemis

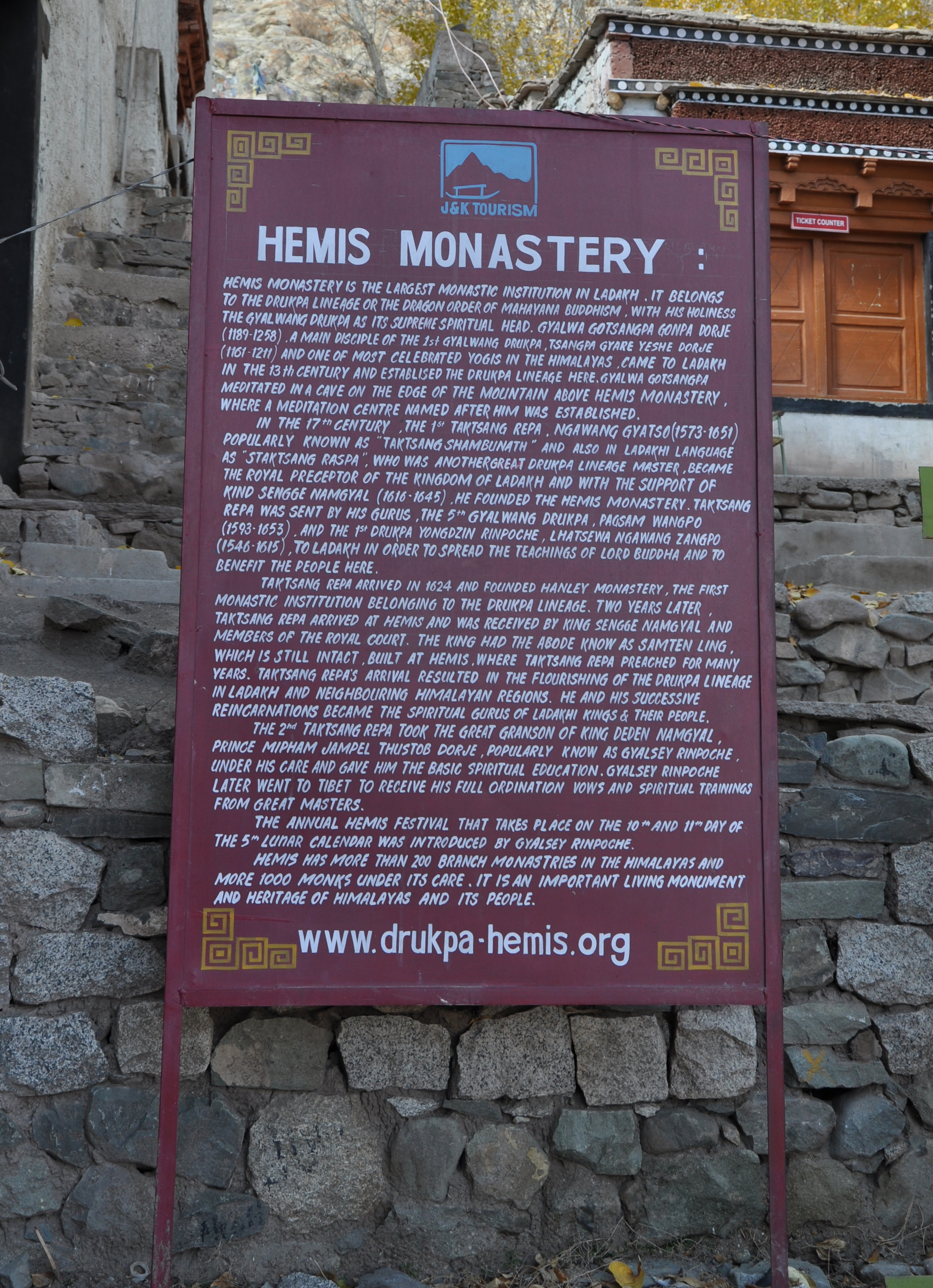
Hemis Monastery, a Buddhist Monastery of Drukpa Order.

Hemis Monastery is a Himalayan Buddhist monastery (gompa) of the Drukpa Lineage, in Hemis on the bank of the Indus River, Ladakh, India. Situated 45 km from Leh, it was re-established in 1672 by the Ladakhi king Sengge Namgyal. The annual Hemis festival honouring Padmasambhava is held there in early June.

Hemis village is located 40 km southeast of Leh on Leh-Manali Highway and under-construction Bhanupli–Leh line.

== History ==
Hemis Monastery existed before the 11th century.

In 1894 Russian journalist Nicolas Notovitch claimed Hemis as the origin of an otherwise unknown gospel, the Life of Saint Issa, Best of the Sons of Men, in which Jesus is said to have travelled to India during his 'lost years'. According to Notovitch, the work had been preserved in the Hemis library and was shown to him by the monks there while he was recuperating from a broken leg, and his Sherpa guide translated it for him. Notovich's version of the manuscript was translated from Tibetan to Russian to French to English. However, historians view Notovitch as having fabricated the evidence, which he allegedly admitted himself. Bible scholar Bart D. Ehrman states that "Today there is not a single recognized scholar on the planet who has any doubts about the matter. The entire story was invented by Notovitch, who earned a good deal of money and a substantial amount of notoriety for his hoax."

The Indian Pandit Swami Abhedananda claims to have read the same manuscript and published his account of viewing it after his visit to Hemis in 1921. Abhedananda claims on the book jacket that it was translated for him with the help of a "local Lama interpreter", and it substantially matched Notovich's publication. After Abhedananda's death, one of his disciples said that when he went to the monastery to ask about the documents, he was told that they had disappeared.

== Paintings of Mahasiddhas ==
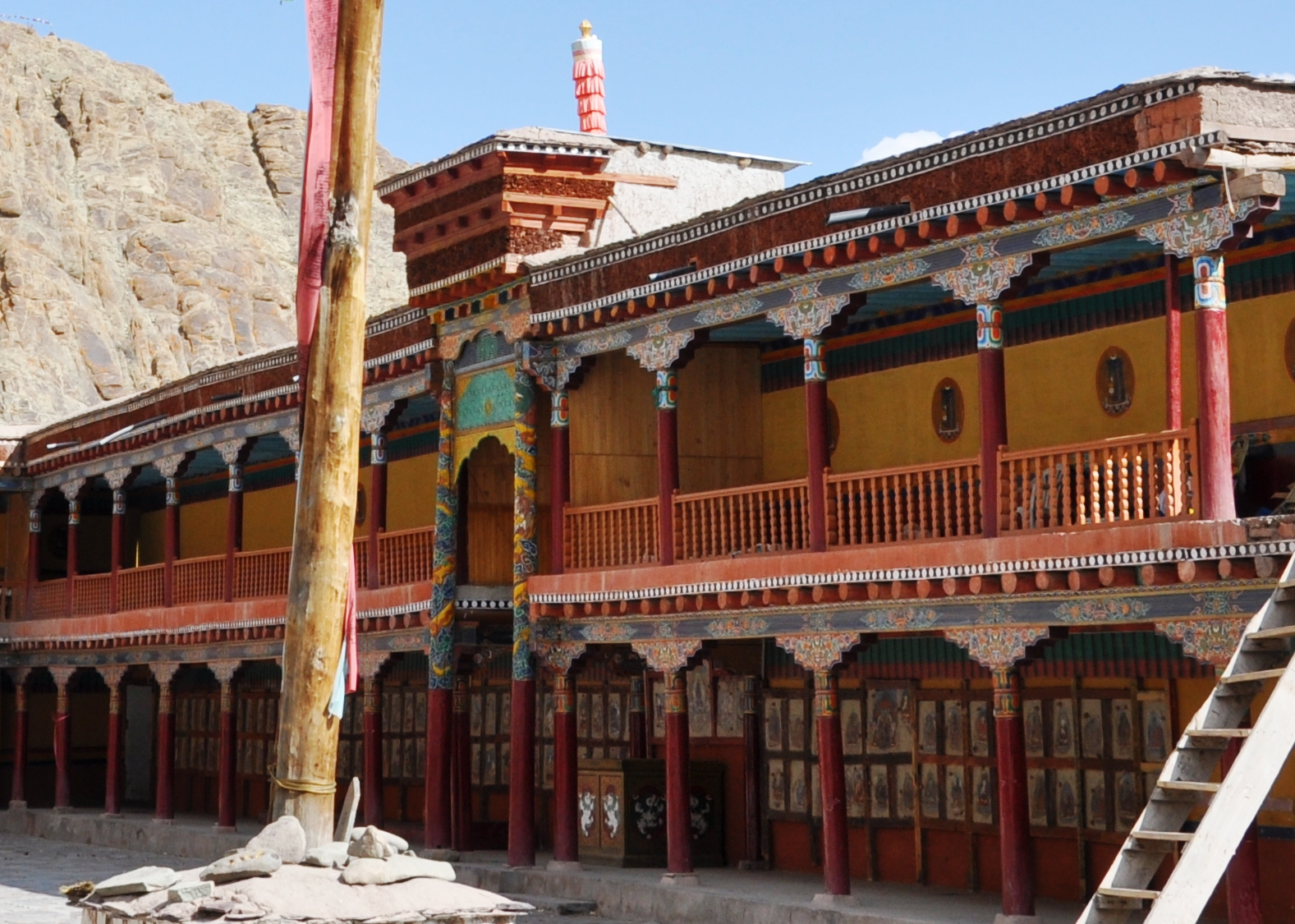
Courtyard with paintings of Mahasiddhas

In the courtyard of the monastery, there is a gallery with paintings of the Eighty-Four Mahasiddhas, dating back to the 17th century. These paintings are created using ground mineral pigments.

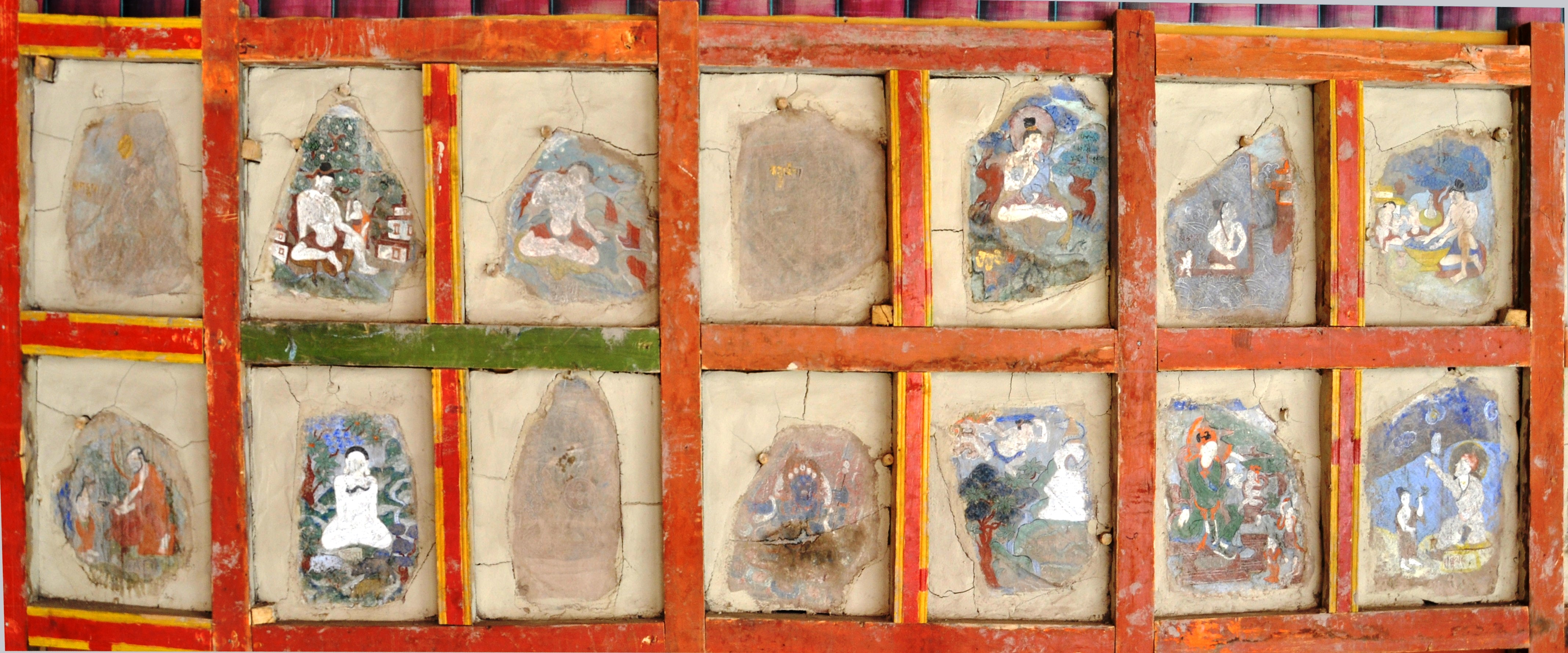
Paintings of Mahasiddhas 1

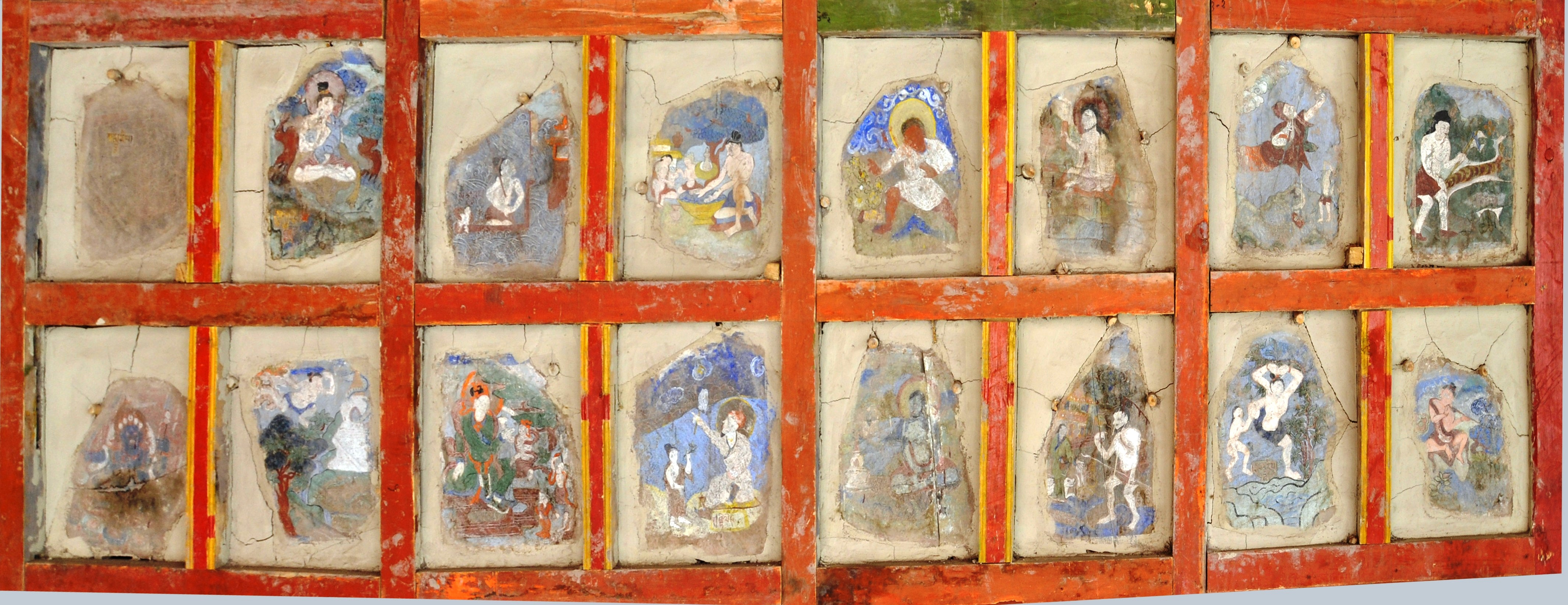
Paintings of Mahasiddhas 2

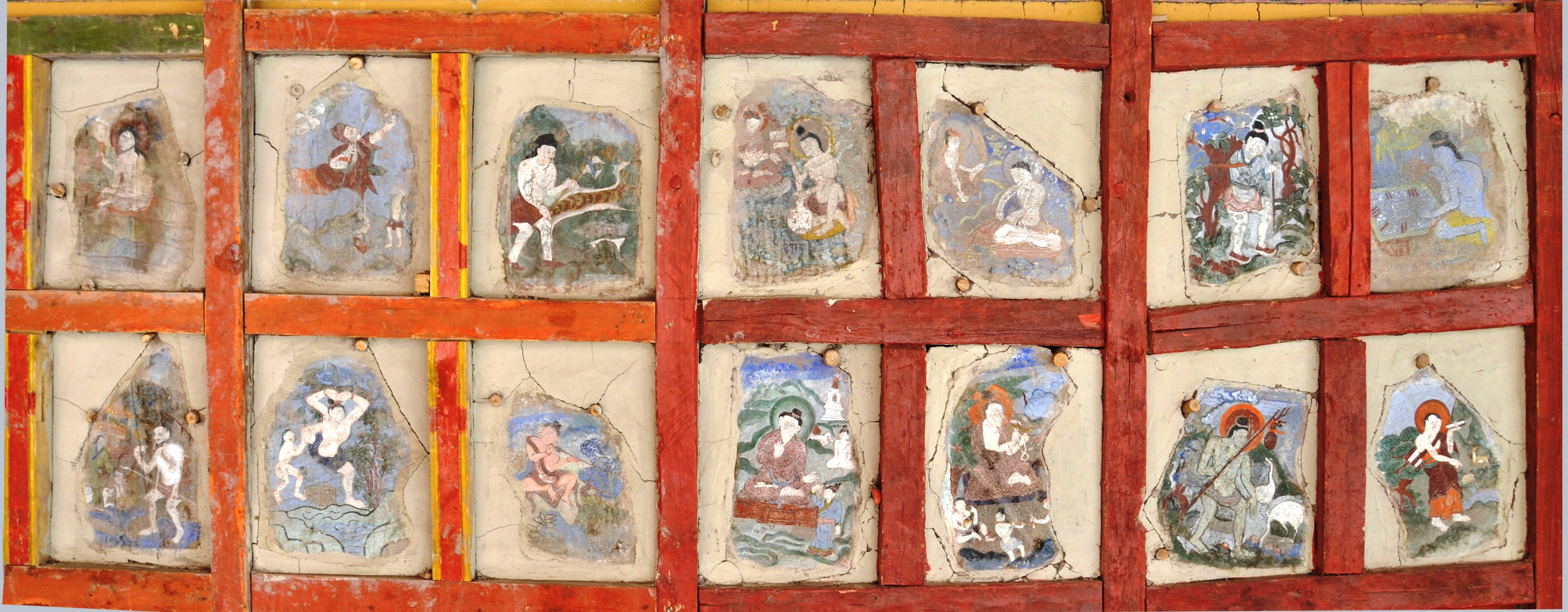
Paintings of Mahasiddhas 3

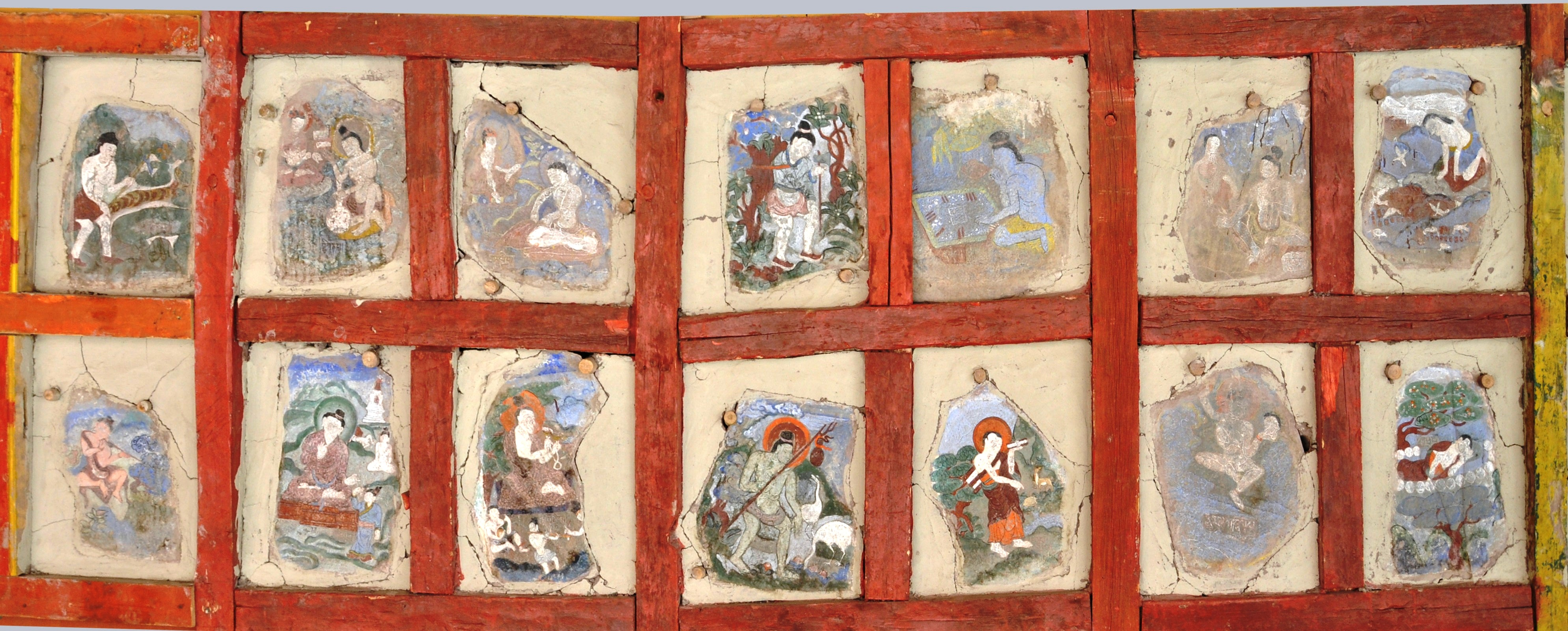
Paintings of Mahasiddhas 4

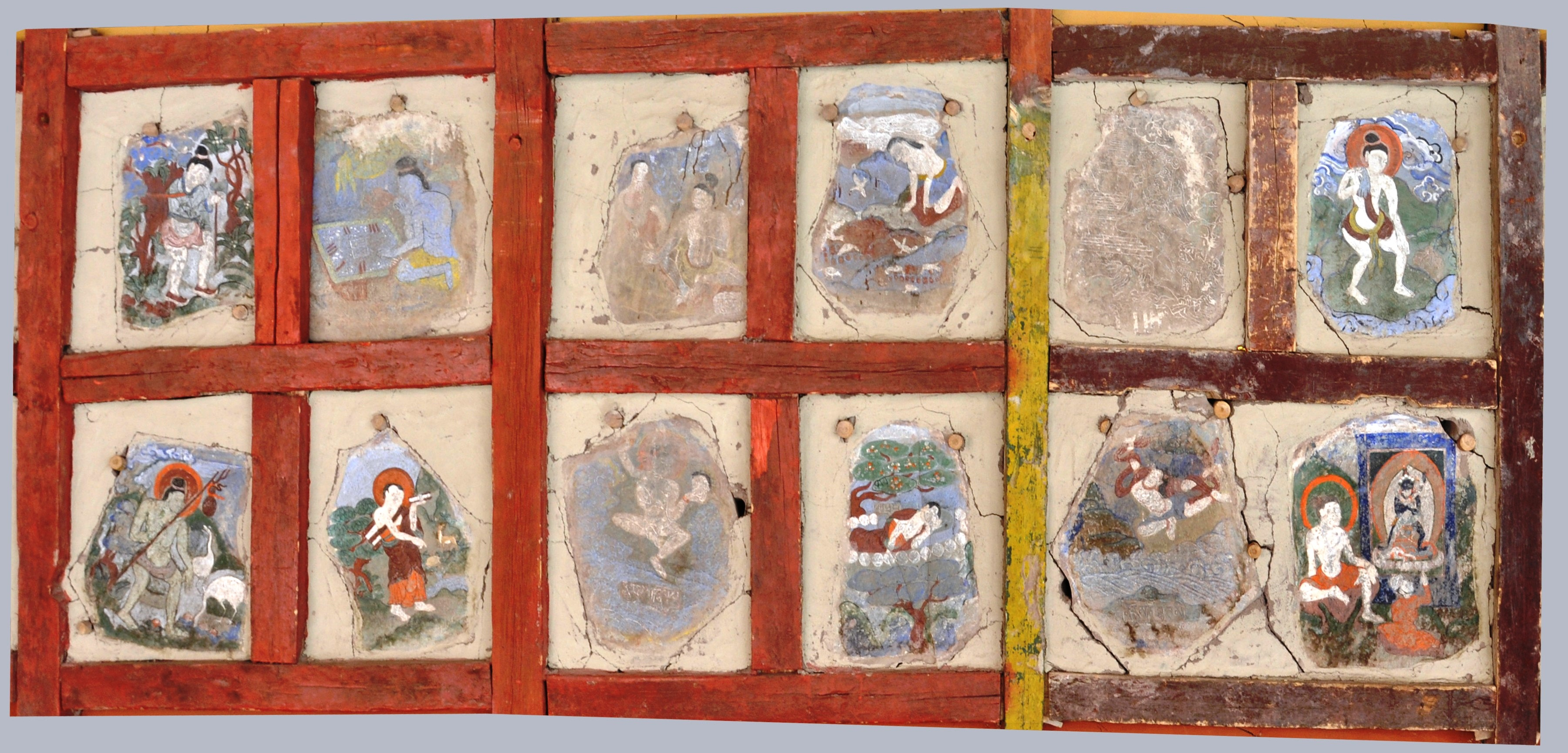
Paintings of Mahasiddhas 5

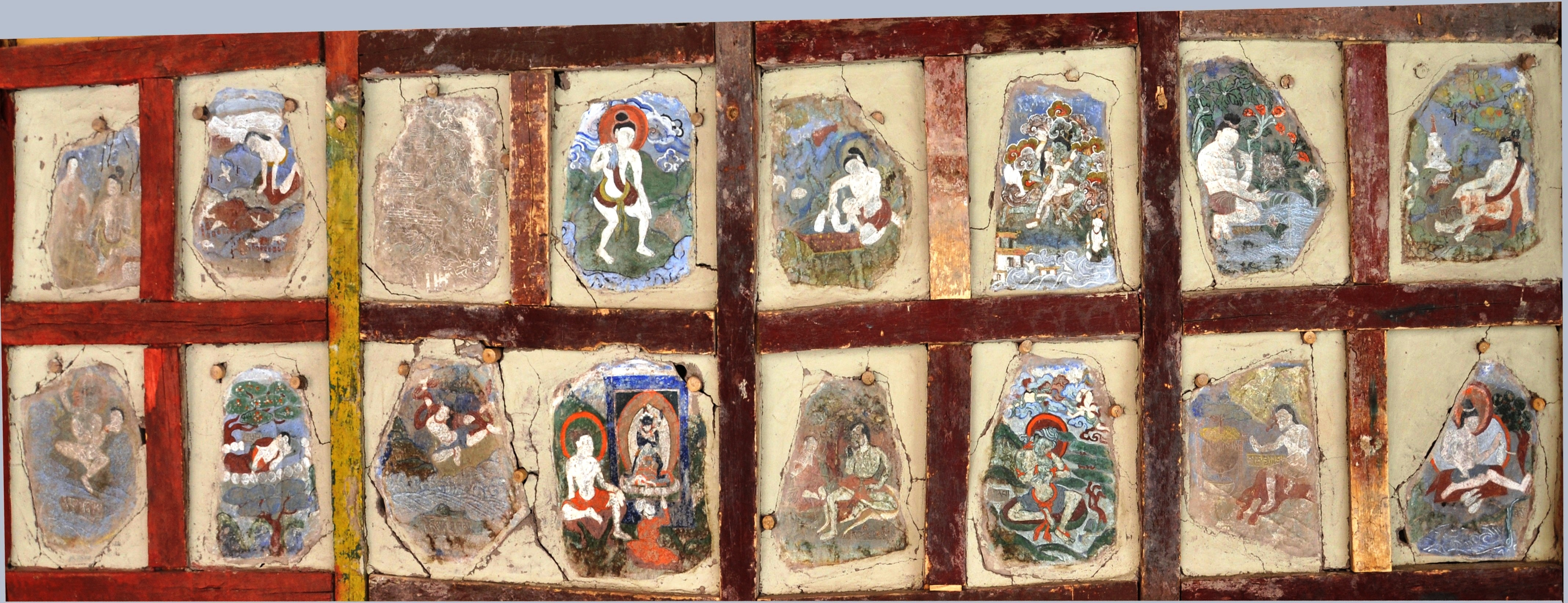
Paintings of Mahasiddhas 6

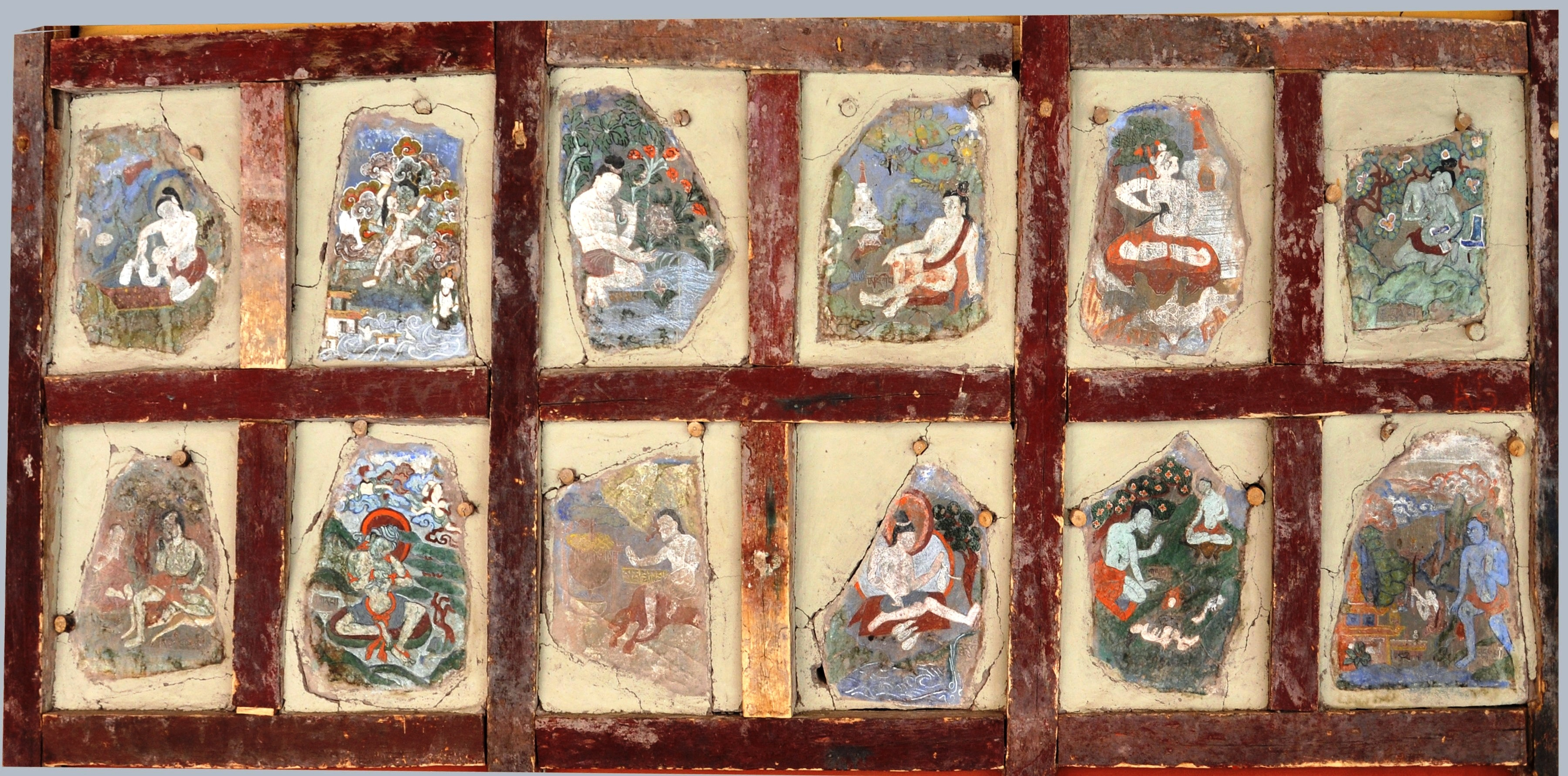
Paintings of Mahasiddhas 7

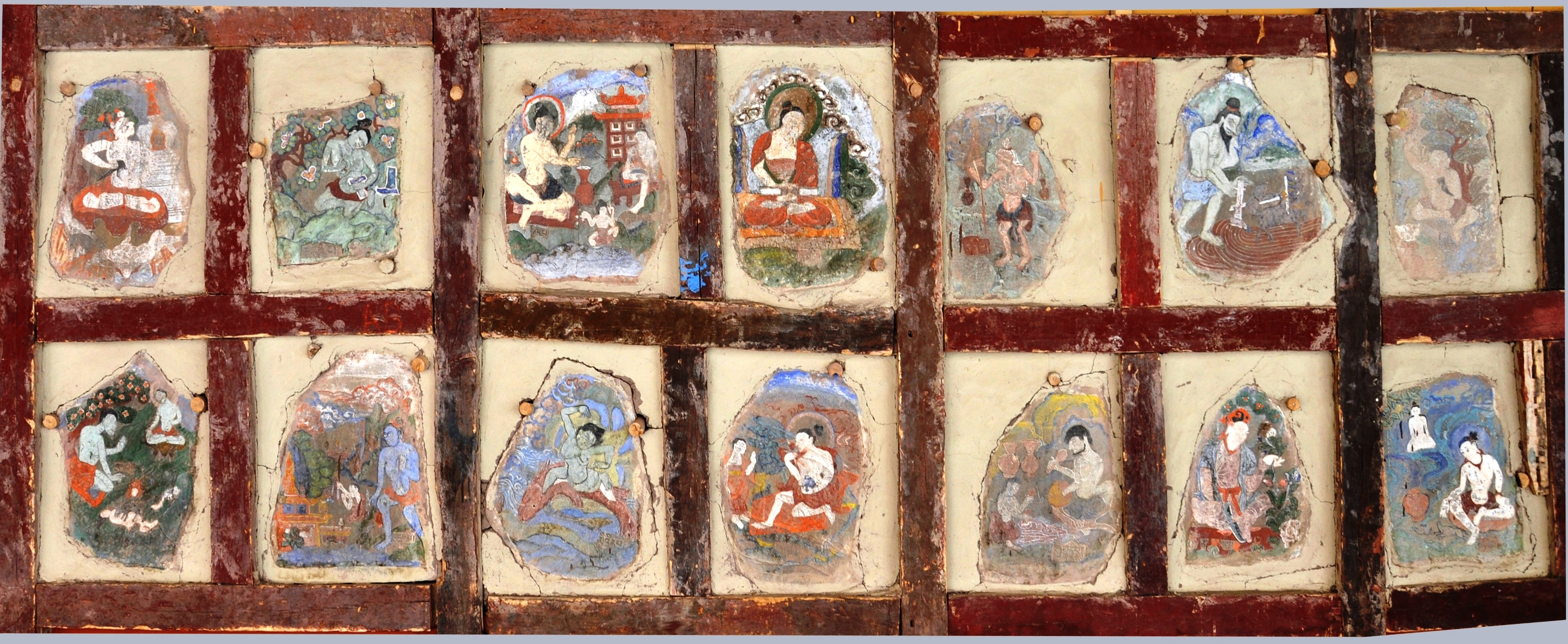
Paintings of Mahasiddhas 8

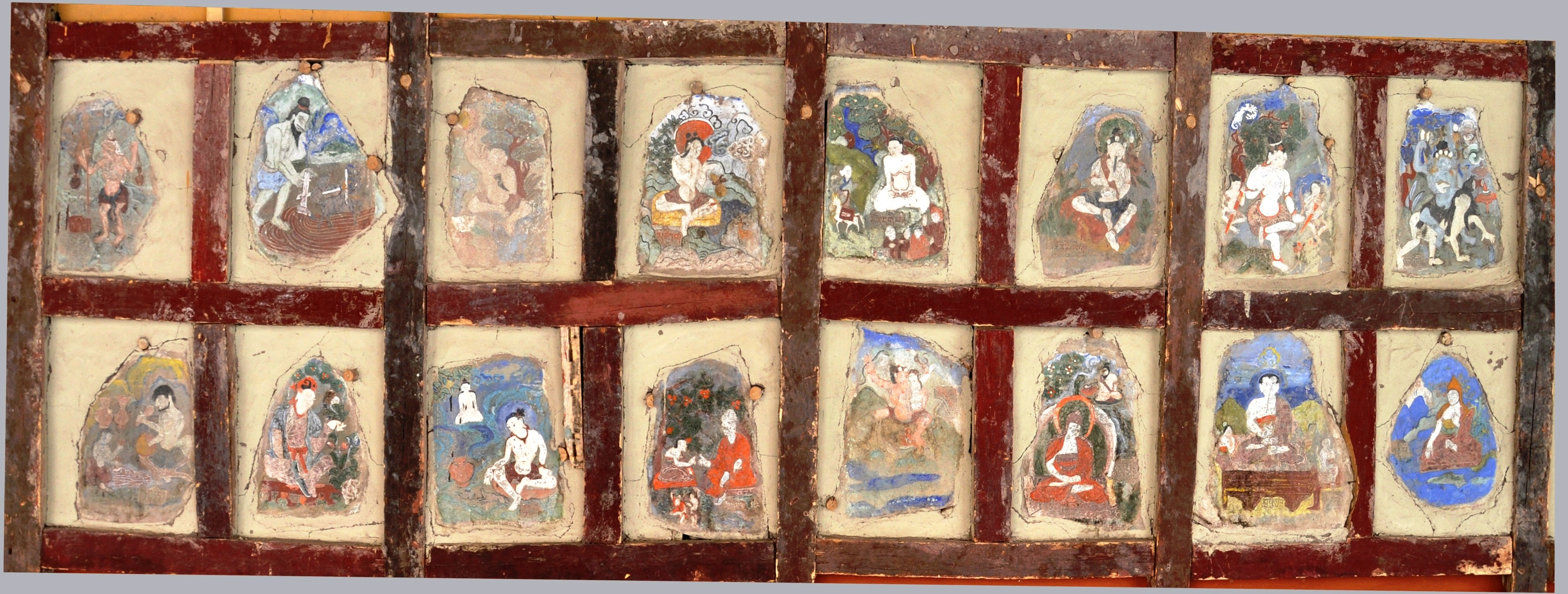
Paintings of Mahasiddhas 9

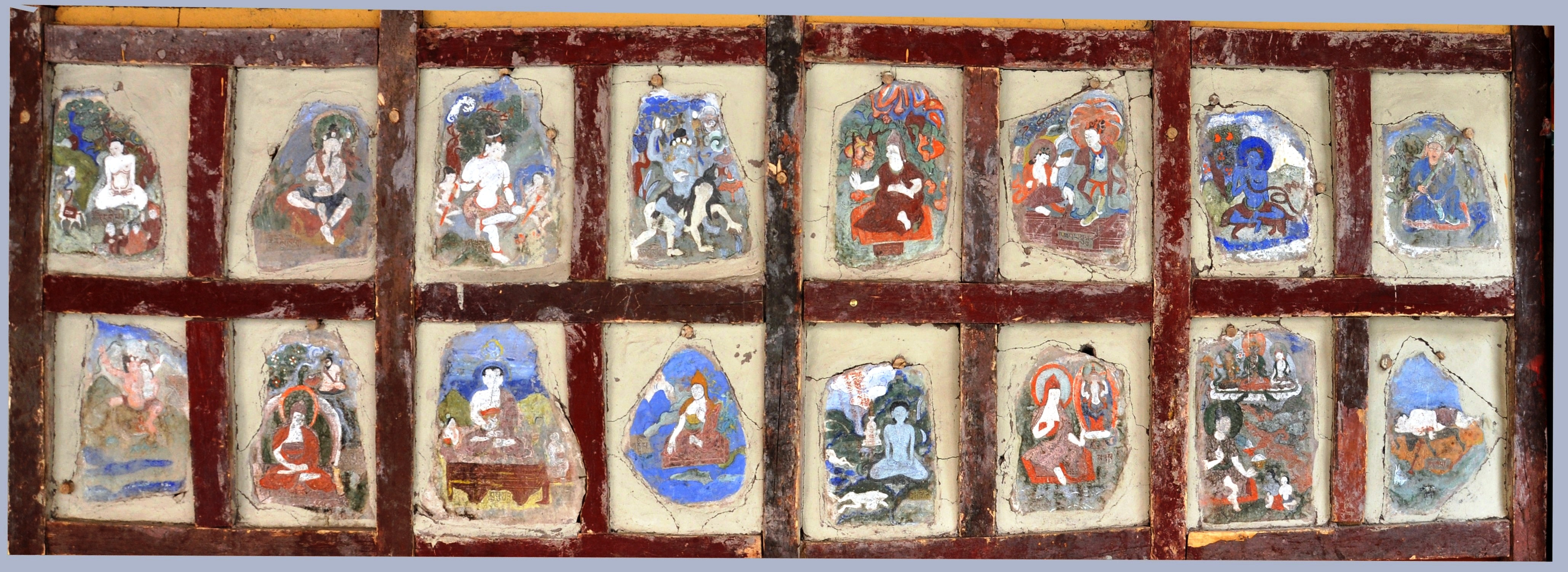
Paintings of Mahasiddhas 10

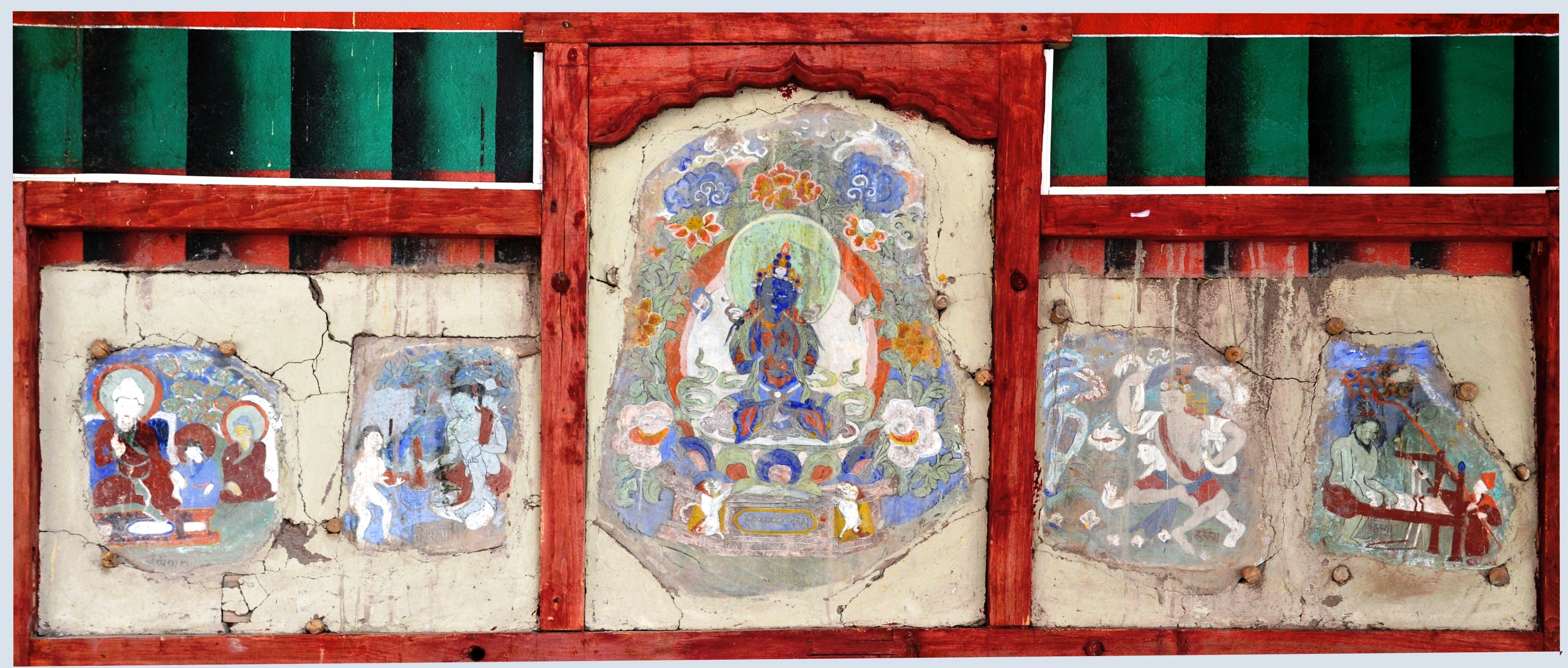
Paintings of Mahasiddhas 11

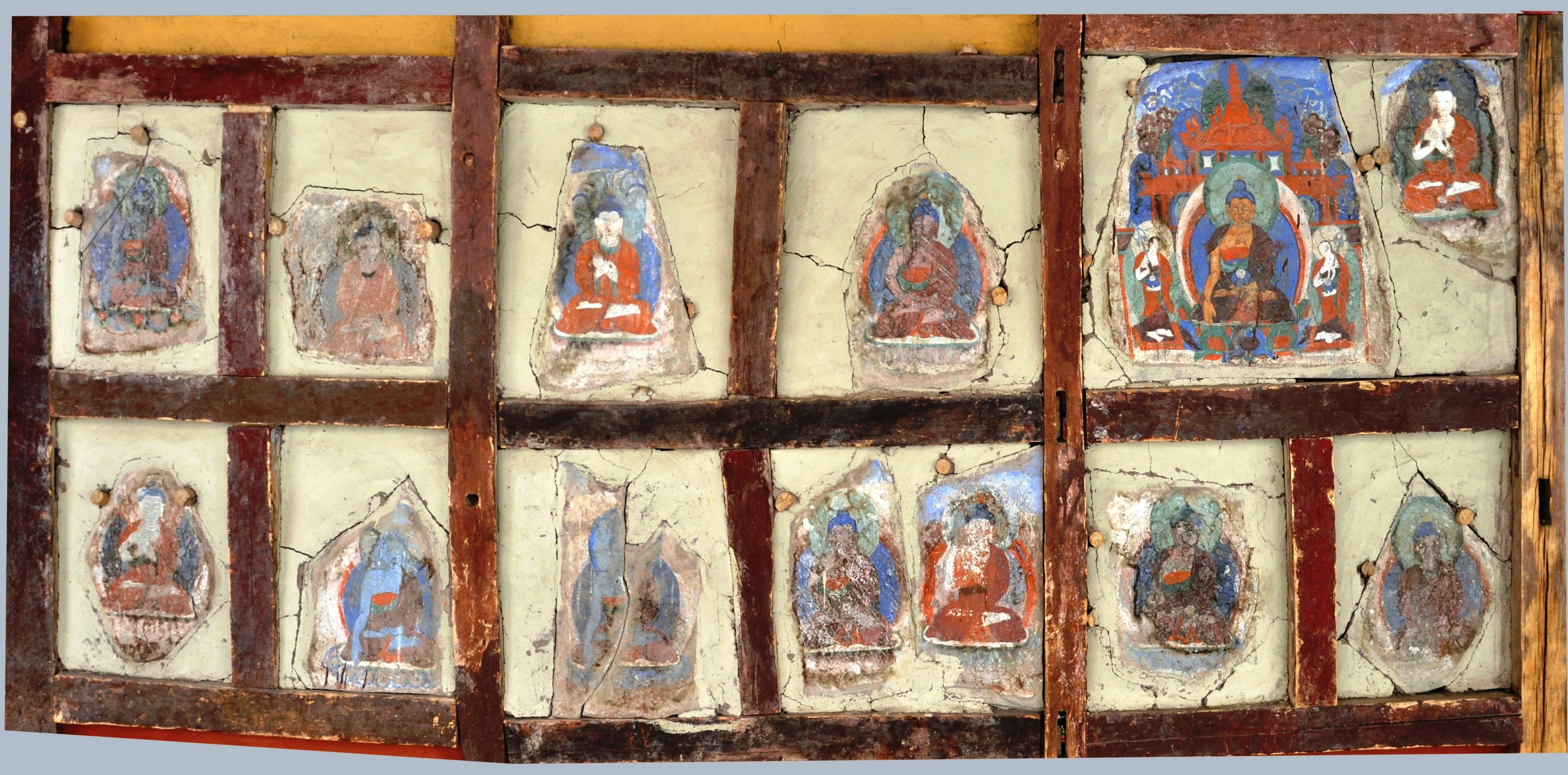
Paintings of Mahasiddhas 12

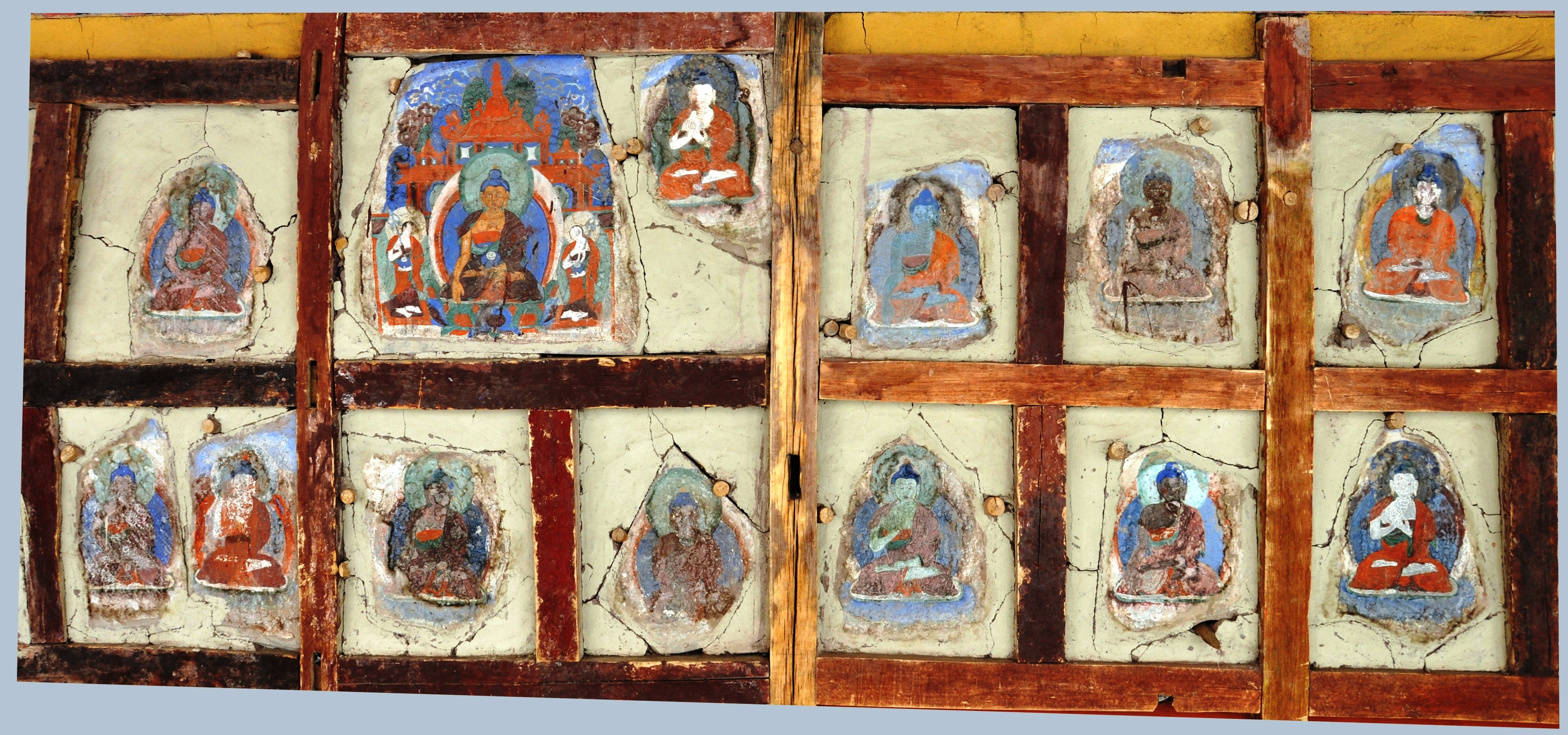
Paintings of Mahasiddhas 13

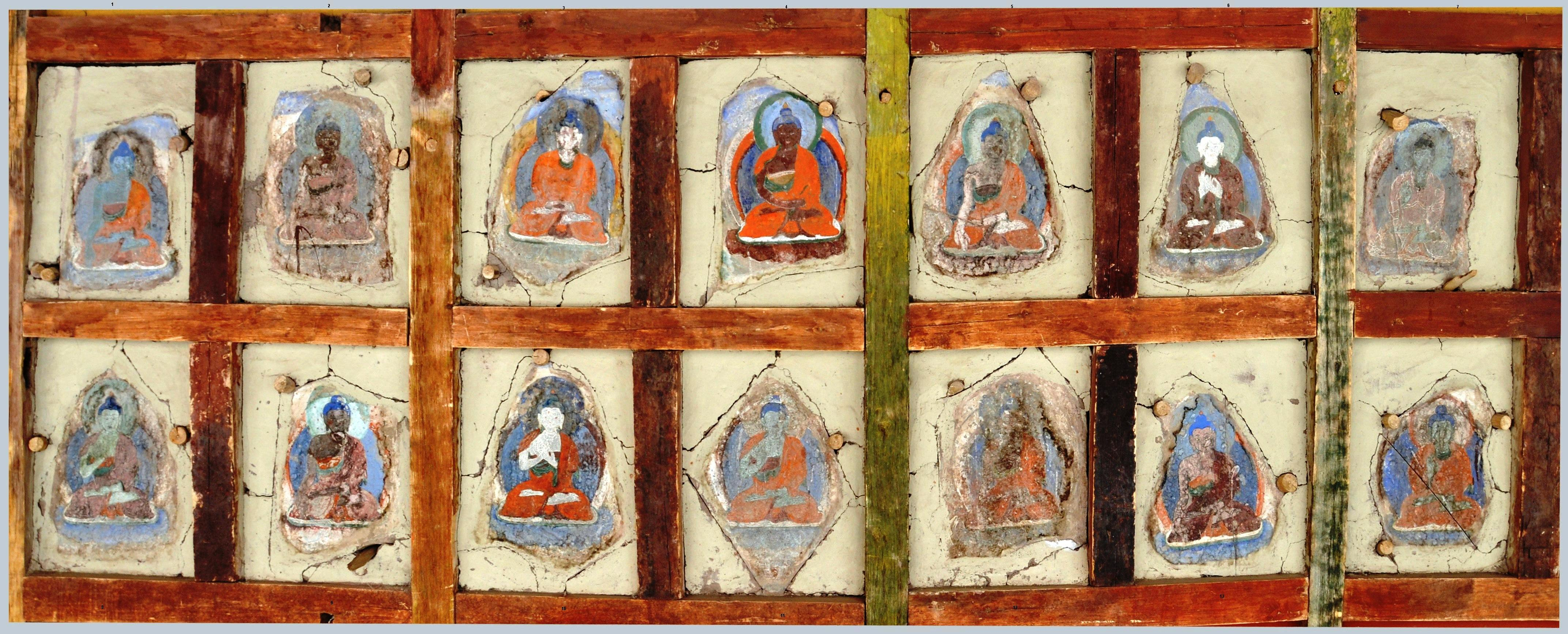
Paintings of Mahasiddhas 14

== Hemis Festival ==
The Hemis Festival, also known as Hemis tshe-bcu, is dedicated to Lord Padmasambhava (Guru Rinpoche), revered as the representative reincarnate of Buddha. He is believed to have been born on the 10th day of the fifth month (non or jyestha) of the Monkey year of the Tibetan calendar, as predicted by the Buddha Shakyamuni. It is also believed that his life mission was, and remains, to improve the spiritual condition of all living beings. Therefore, on this day, which comes once in a cycle of 12 years, Hemis observes a major extravaganza in his memory. The observance of these sacred rituals is believed to provide spiritual strength and good health. The Hemis festival takes place in the rectangular courtyard in front of the main door of the monastery. The space is wide and open, save for two raised square platforms, three feet high with a sacred pole in the center. A raised dais with a richly cushioned seat, a finely painted small Tibetan table, and ceremonial items – cups full of holy water, uncooked rice, and tormas made of dough and butter, along with incense sticks – are placed. A number of musicians play traditional music with four pairs of cymbals, large-pan drums, small trumpets, and large-sized wind instruments. Next to them, a small space is assigned for the lamas to sit.

The ceremonies begin with an early morning ritual atop the gompa, where, to the beat of drums, the resounding clash of cymbals, and the spiritual wail of pipes, the portrait of "Dadmokarpo" or "Rygyalsras Rinpoche" is ceremoniously displayed for all to admire and worship.

The most esoteric festivities include the mystic mask dances. The mask dances of Ladakh are collectively referred to as chams performances. Chams performances are essentially part of the Tantric tradition, performed only in those gompas that follow the Tantric Vajrayana teachings, and the monks perform tantric worship.

== Gallery ==
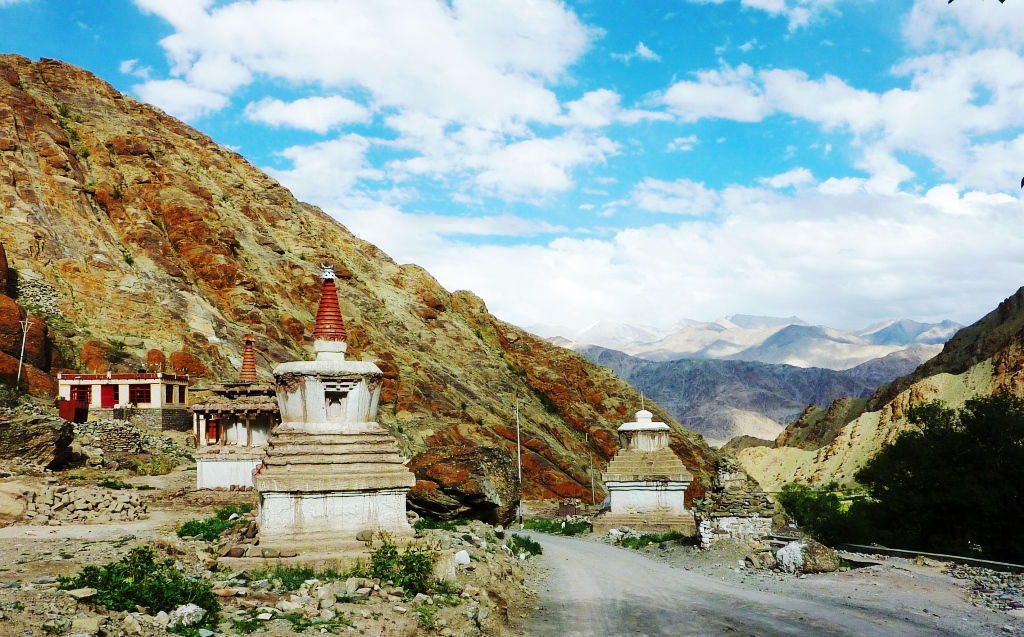
Chortens at Hemis gompa

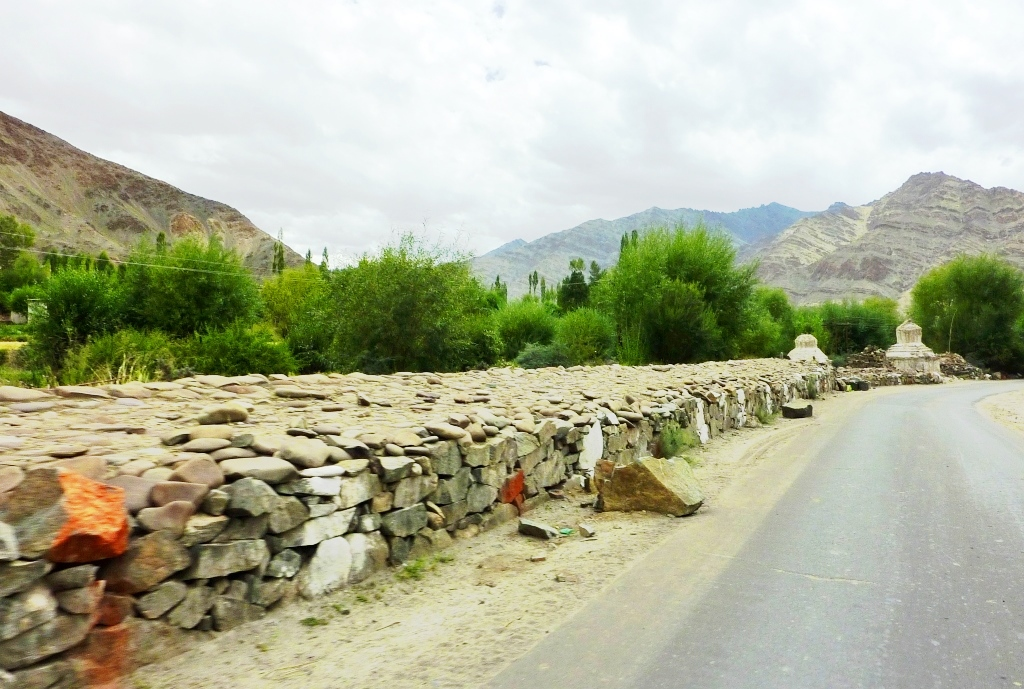
Mani wall along the driveway to Hemis Monastery

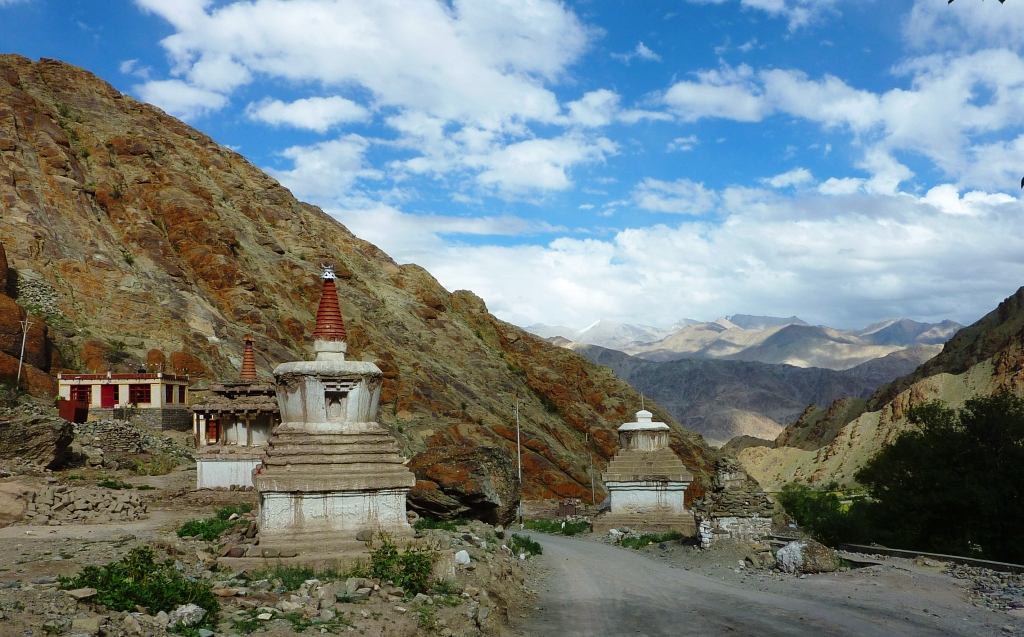
View from Hemis Monastery. 2010

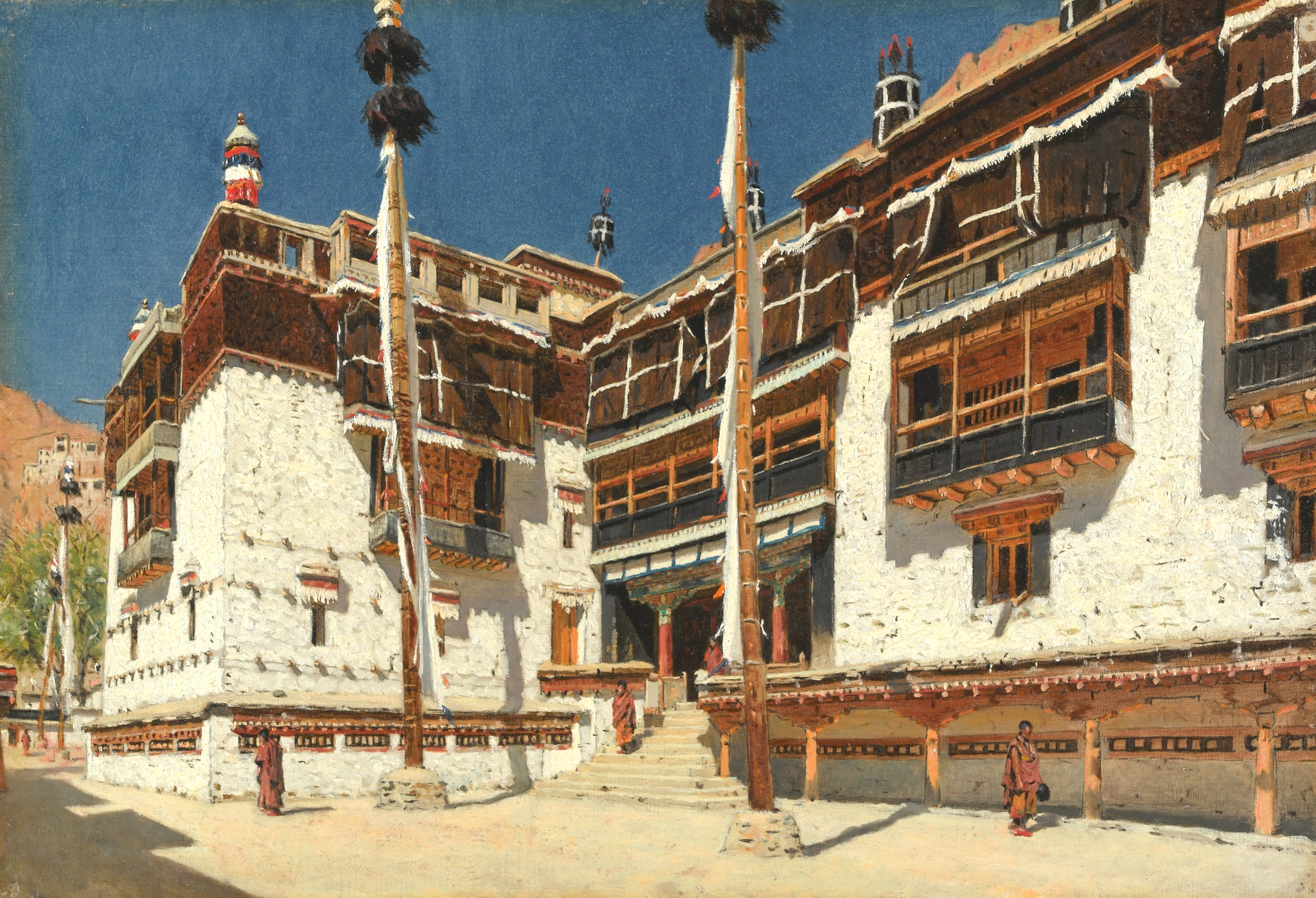
Hemis Monastery in Ladakh, by Vasily Vereshchagin (1875)

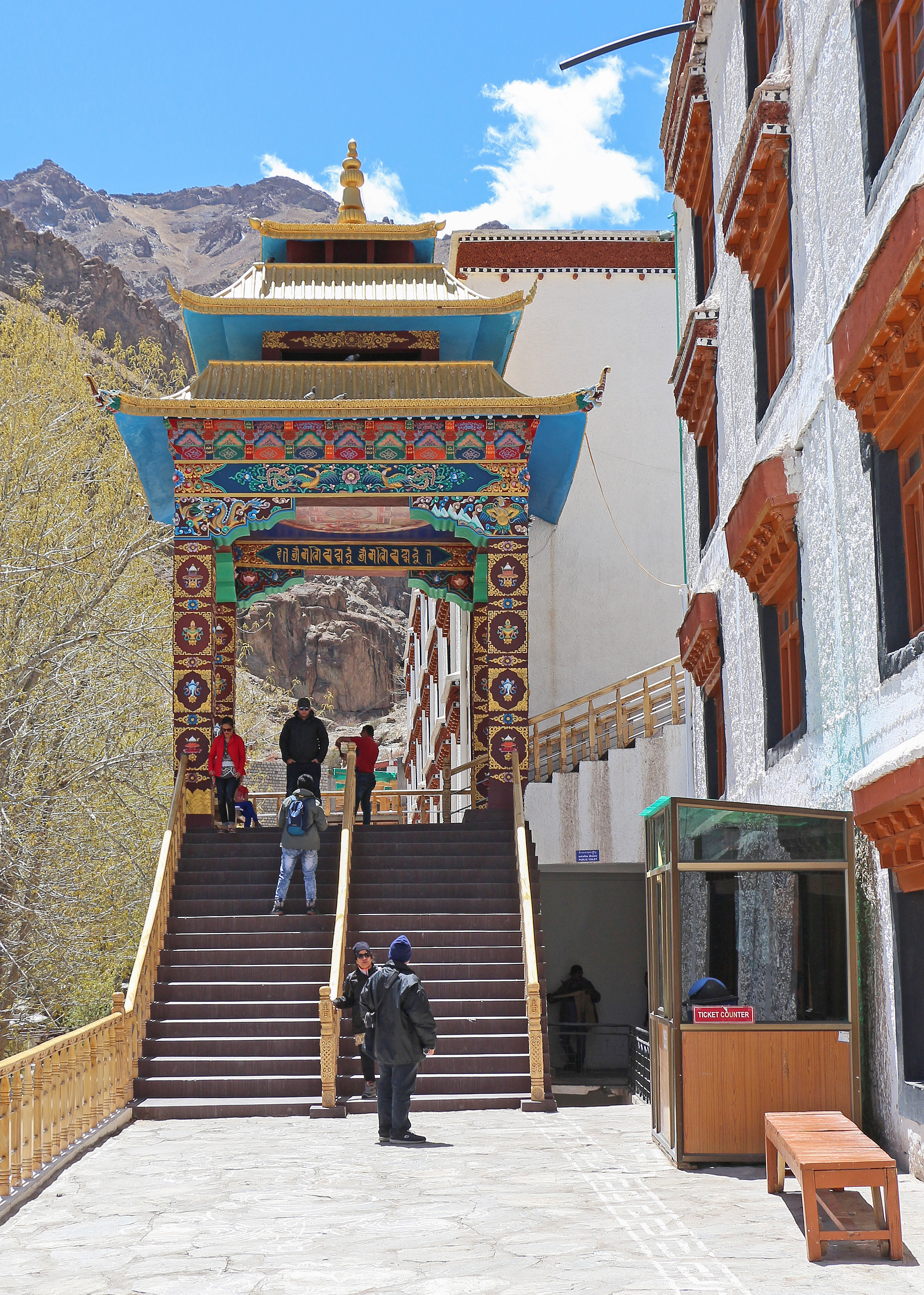
The entrance to Hemis monastery

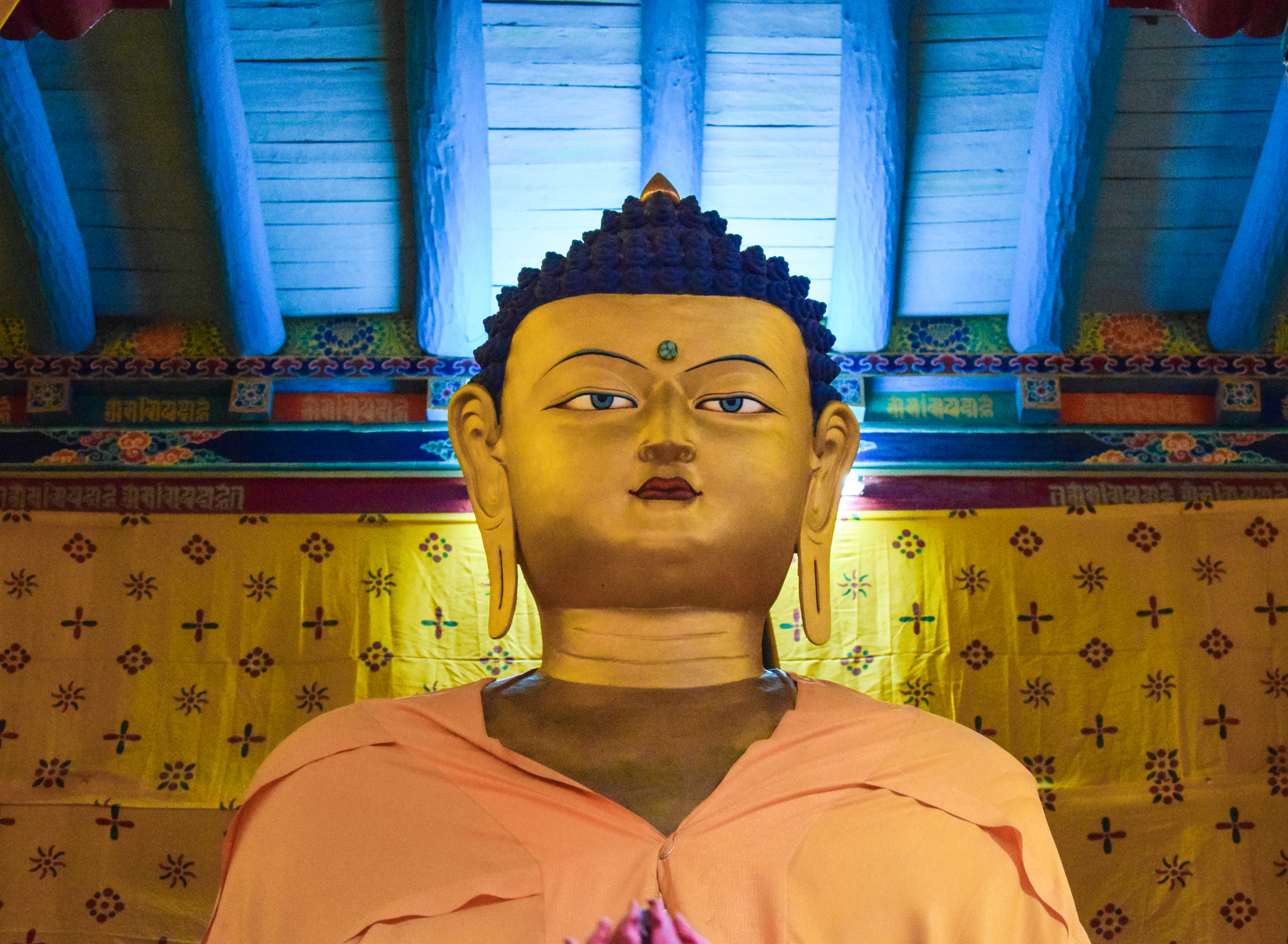
Inside the Hemis monastery

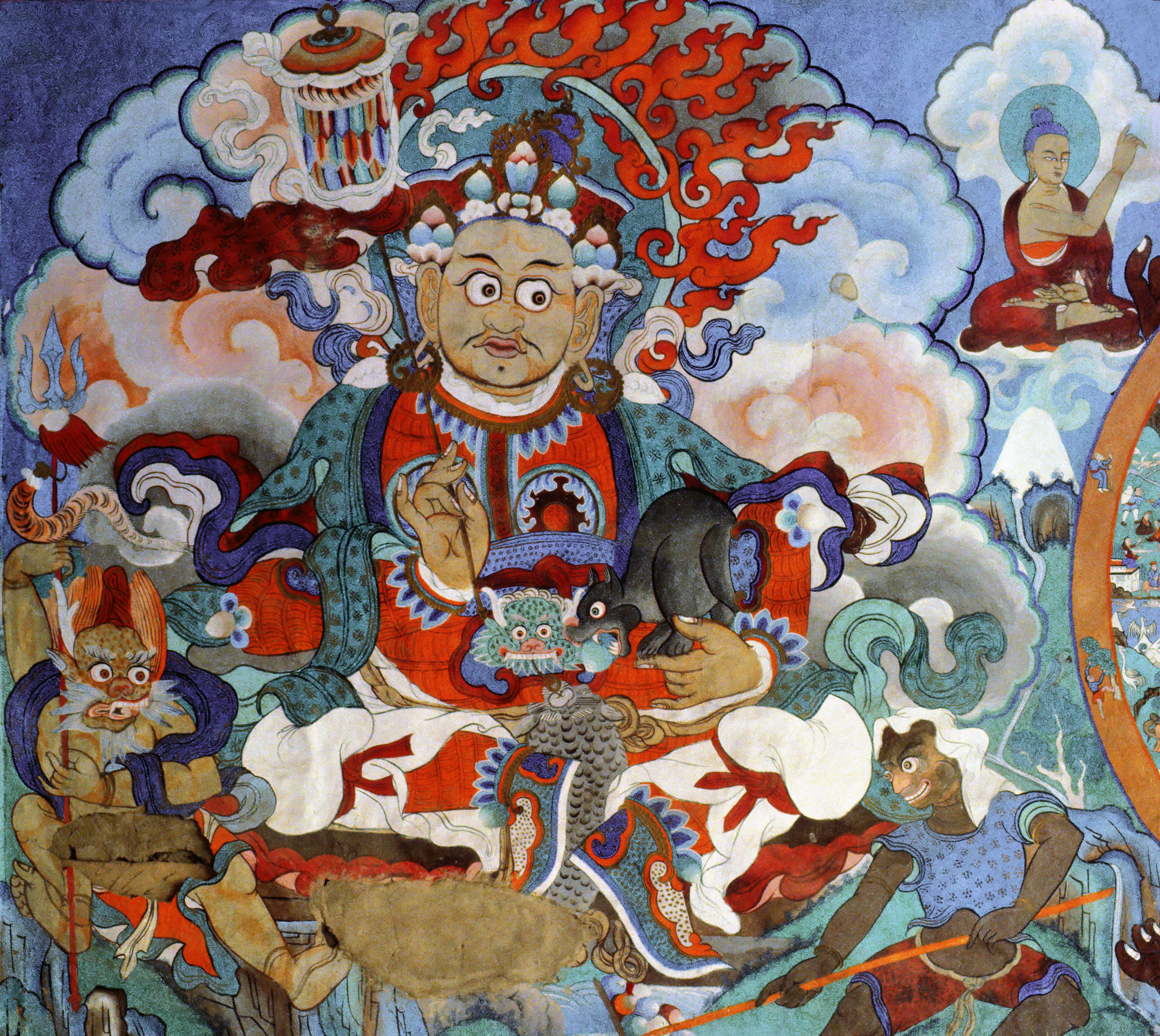
Mural painting in the Hemis monastery

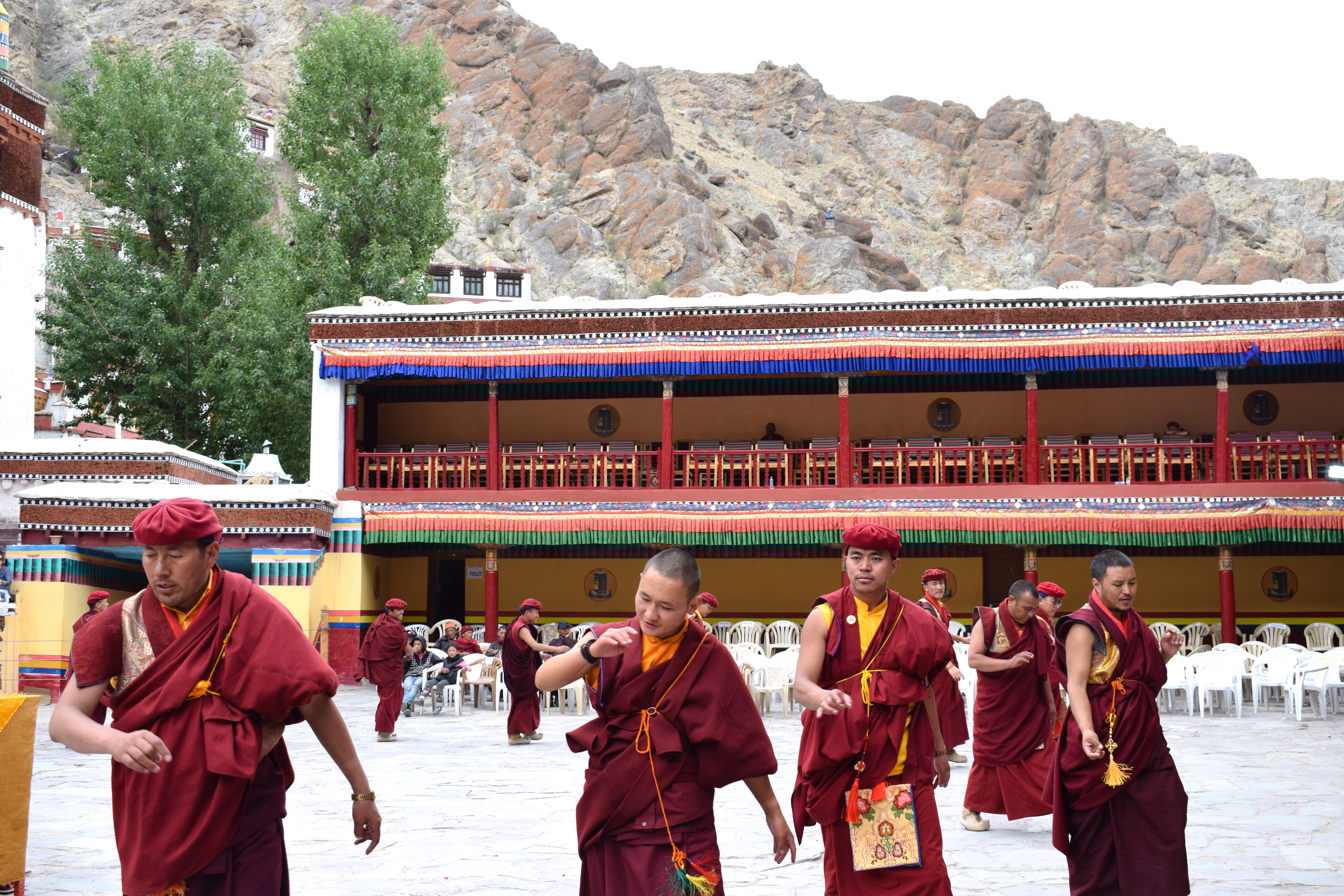
Traditional monk dance at Hemis Festival

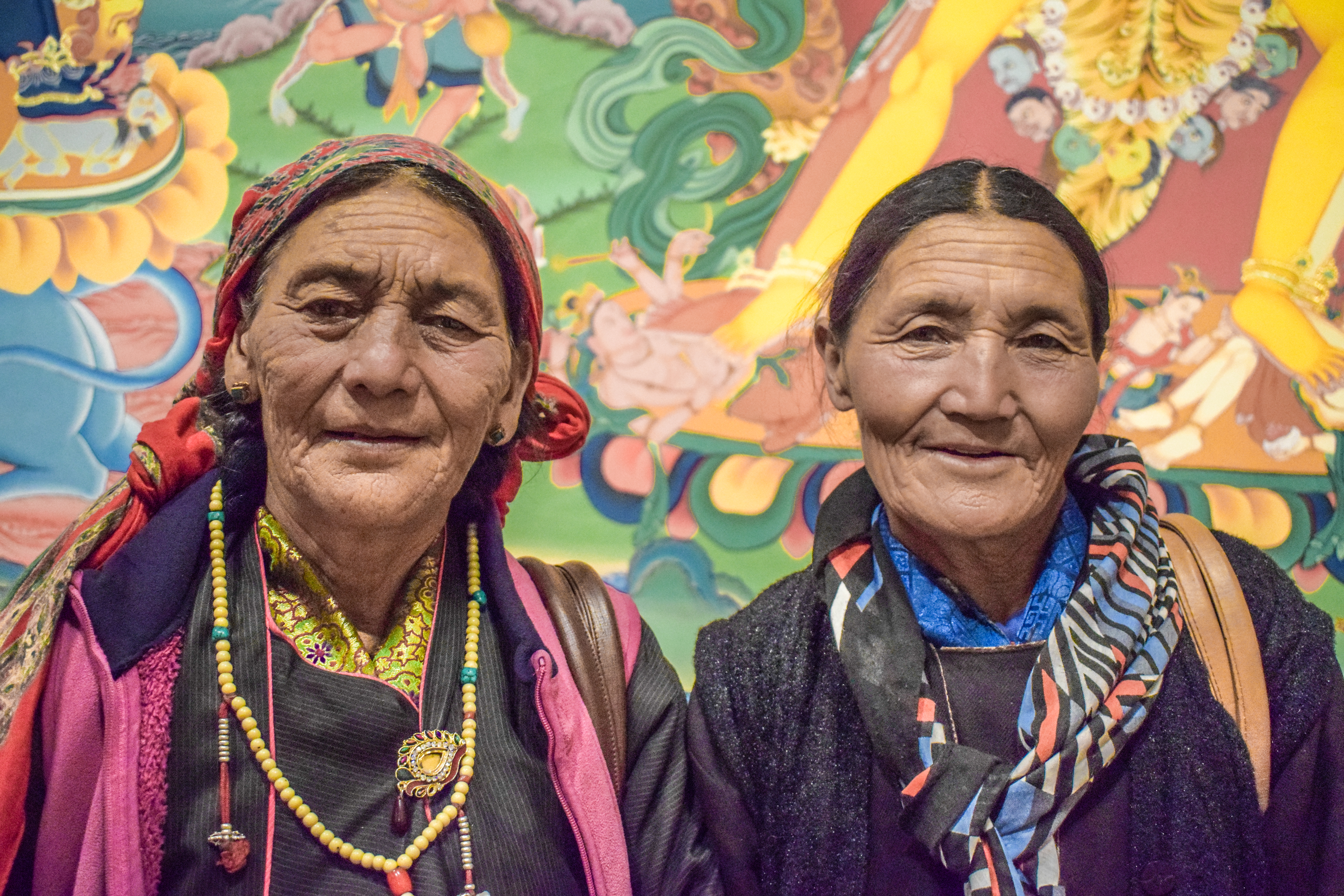
Traditional Ladakhi women at Hemis monastery

== See also ==
- List of Buddhist monasteries in Ladakh
- Tourism in Ladakh
