= Deportation of Soviet Germans (1941–1942) =

Soviet forced displacement of ethnic Germans

- Part of Population transfer in the Soviet Union and World War II
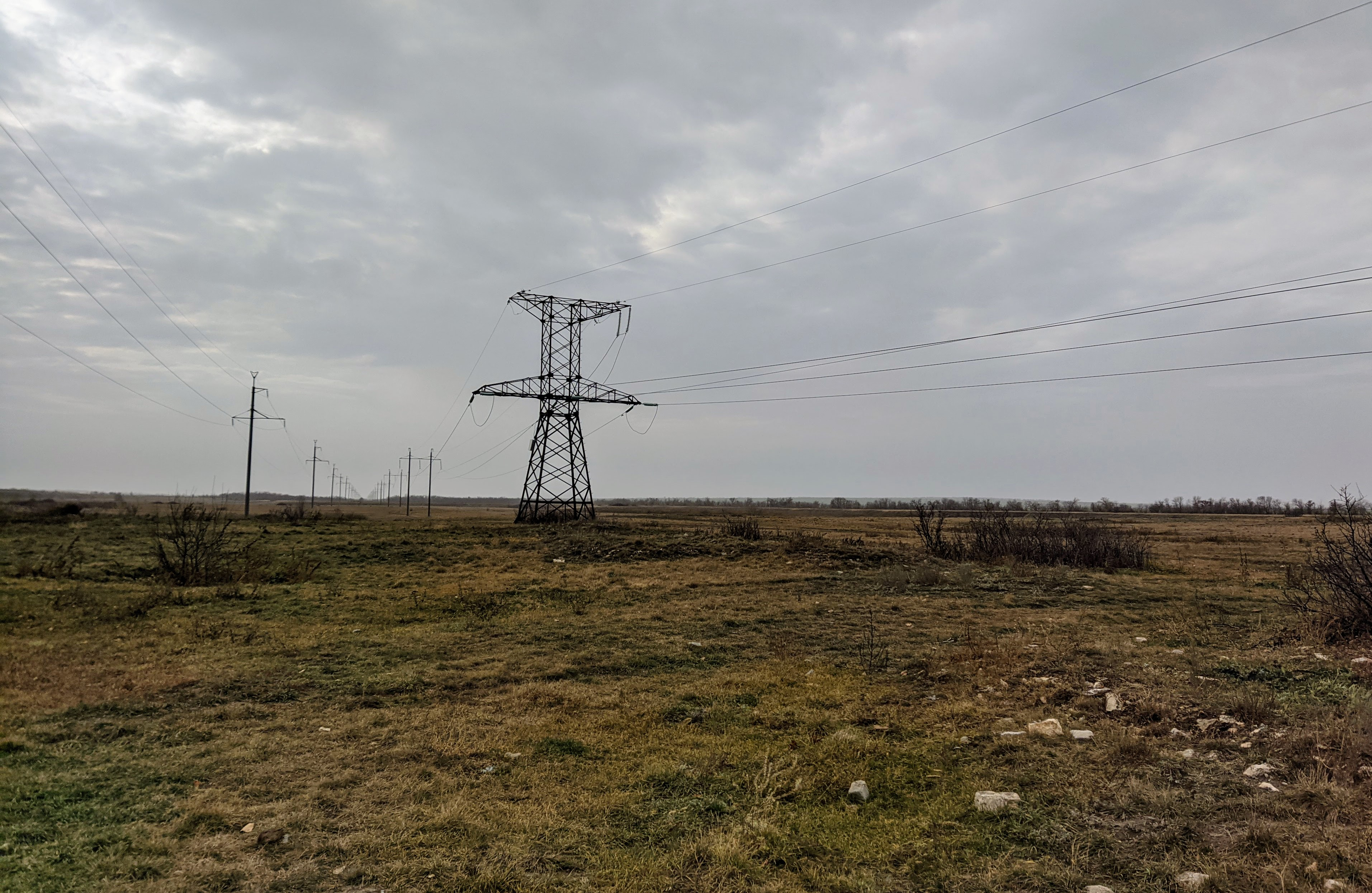
- Destroyed Volga German village in Dobrinka (Frolovsky District), 2021

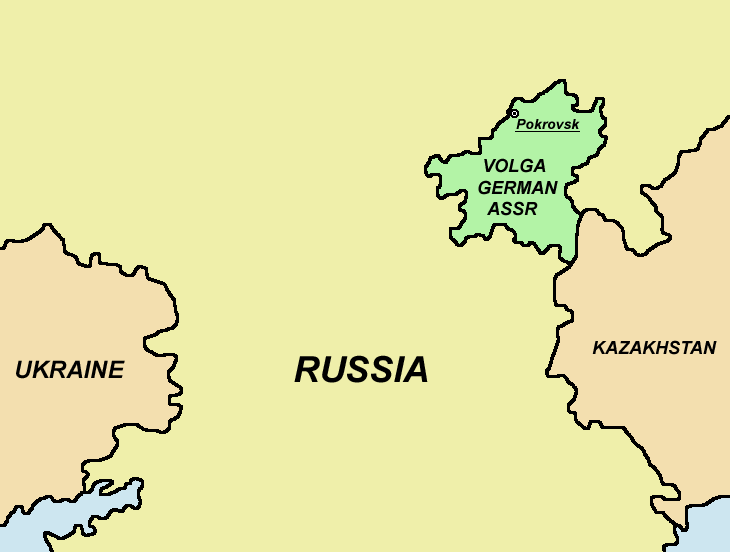
- Volga German Autonomous Soviet Socialist Republic before it was abolished in 1941
- Location: Soviet Union
- Date: August 1941–1942, 1944–1945
- Target: Soviet Germans
- Attack type: Forced displacement, ethnic cleansing
- Deaths: 228,800
- Perpetrators: NKVD, the Soviet secret police
- Motive: fear of fifth column after the German invasion of the Soviet Union, cheap labor for forced settlements in the Soviet Union

After the German invasion of the Soviet Union in June 1941, ethnic Germans living in the Soviet Union were subject to mass deportation starting from August 1941 by the NKVD on the orders of Soviet leader Joseph Stalin. At least 846,340 Soviet Germans were deported in the first wave, while an additional 203,796 Germans forcibly repatriated from Germany and other parts of Eastern Europe were sent in the next wave to special settlements in the Soviet Union or gulags across Siberia and Kazakh SSR for forced labor. The Volga German Autonomous Soviet Socialist Republic was abolished. The Soviet government feared that Soviet Germans would collaborate with Nazi Germany and endanger the war effort, so it had the local Germans deported further east, where many died. By one estimate, there were 228,800 fatalities among the deported Soviet Germans.

== Background ==
Most Soviet Germans were descendants of settlers who came from Germany at the invitation of the tsar during the Russian Empire. During the Soviet period, they suffered suspicion of being more loyal to Germany than their home country and were one of the most persecuted ethnic groups in the Soviet Union. According to the 1939 Soviet census, there were 1,424,000 Germans in the USSR. An estimated 69,000 to 73,000 Germans were arrested and 46,000 killed as part of the Great Purge in 1937 (see the German operation of the NKVD); afterwards, they were overrepresented in the gulag population. Although the Soviet government at first supported equality and self determination of different ethnic groups, in 1938, the Soviet government changed nationality from a feature individuals could self-declare to one that was inherited from one's parents at birth and unchangeable. In the late 1930s, tens of thousands of Germans, as well as Poles and Finns, were deported away from the borders of the Soviet Union as part of an effort to secure the border. The deportation of Soviet Koreans in 1937 served as a model for later deportations of Germans. On 22 June 1941, Germany invaded the Soviet Union and the German Army initially advanced quickly towards the Soviet capital.

== Deportation ==
=== Crimea ===
The first group of Germans affected by mass deportation during World War II were those living in Crimea, pursuant to a NKVD decree issued on 15 August 1941. Nearly 60,000 were temporarily moved to Ordzhonikidze Krai and Rostov Oblast before being sent farther east in October 1941. In 1944, the Soviet Union deported over a thousand Germans who had evaded deportation in 1941 as well as tens of thousands of Crimean Tatars, Greeks, Armenians, and Bulgarians from Crimea, only leaving ethnic Russians and Ukrainians. The Germans deported from Crimea in 1941 were only allowed to bring 50 kilograms (110 lb) of luggage and did not receive any receipt for property left behind. The chaos shocked even some NKVD members.

=== Volga region ===
Historians do not know exactly when the Soviet government decided to deport the much larger group of 479,841 Germans from the Volga region, mostly from the Volga German ASSR, but including the Saratov and Stalingrad oblasts, but the decree to deport them all was issued on 26 August 1941. This decree provided no rationale for the deportation and was kept secret and unpublished. Plans called for 433,000 people to be deported, 333,000 to Siberia and 100,000 to Kazakhstan, but the plans were not fully followed: the Germans were scattered to existing collective farms rather than isolated in their own settlements, and urban dwellers were mostly not resettled in towns and cities. They were allowed to bring up to 1 ton in property and the decree called for them to "receive compensation for buildings, agricultural equipment, livestock except horses, and grain in their new places of residence".

However, "the NKVD failed to implement many of the provisions for the well being of the deportees leaving them without sufficient food, medicine, or housing". Most deportees received only a few hours to pack their belongings and could take only what they could carry. Due to chaos many people were separated from their family or lost property. The actual deportation took place from 3 to 20 September, mostly by rail organized by Lazar Kaganovich's NKPS (People's Commissariat of Communication Routes of the Soviet Union). Although the NKVD expected violent resistance because the Volga Germans had previously resisted exactions during the Russian Civil War and collectivization, in reality there was little. The only exception to deportation was for German women married to non-German men; non-German women married to Germans had to choose between exile and divorce.

The Soviet state claimed that many Volga Germans were coordinating with Hitler's Germany to sabotage the Soviet war effort. However, no evidence for this proposition exists and there are no documents found in the German archives that indicate an effort to recruit Soviet Germans. In the wake of the deportation, the Soviet government made an effort to erase traces of the German presence, dissolving the Volga German ASSR and German institutions, razing formerly German villages, and resettling people of other ethnicities. After the dissolution of the Volga German ASSR, Stalin ordered all Germans expelled from the Red Army.

=== Other areas ===
The systematic deportation of Germans from other parts of the western Soviet Union began shortly thereafter, affecting over 380,000 Germans—nearly half those deported in 1941. These deportations began in Moscow and Rostov, proceeding in order to the North Caucasus and Tula, eastern Ukraine, Voronezh, Transcaucasia, Chechnya and Daghestan, Kalmykia, and Kuybyshev. The 31,171 Germans deported across the Caspian Sea from Georgia, Armenia, and Azerbaijan faced particular hardships as they could not be resupplied while at sea.

Those Germans already in Siberia, Kazakhstan, and Central Asia were expelled from cities and forcibly resettled on collective farms.

== Aftermath ==
Kazakhstan was an attractive region to send the deportees as it had been depopulated by the Kazakh famine and had a shortage of agricultural labor. It was also remote, making it more difficult to escape. In less than three months over 400,000 Germans arrived there, about half those deported, while the remainder were sent to Siberia. The deported Germans were not granted the freedom to choose their own residence and were subjected to imprisonment in special settlements in the Soviet Union. Leaving was a criminal offense. Initially, German males between the ages of 17 and 50 were drafted into forced labor battalions. Eligibility was later expanded to 15 to 55 as well as including women from 16 to 45 who were neither pregnant nor had small children. Those remaining in the special settlements were mostly elderly, children, and invalids, who suffered high mortality rates due to difficult conditions. Compared to other collective farm residents they faced discrimination in work assignments and lacked shelter as well as private gardens for growing food. Official figures for the mortality in the special settlements in Kazakhstan was around 8 percent from 1944 to 1949, and it was likely higher earlier in the war. The death rate in the labor battalions was also higher, where an estimated 60,000 to 70,000 Germans died. Although the labor battalions were disbanded in 1948 and special settlement regulations abolished in 1955, Germans were still prohibited from returning home. Although this blanket ban was lifted in 1972, in practice most Germans were unable to relocate. Most eventually emigrated to Germany in the 1990s, although fewer than 200,000 remain in Kazakhstan.

== Evaluation ==
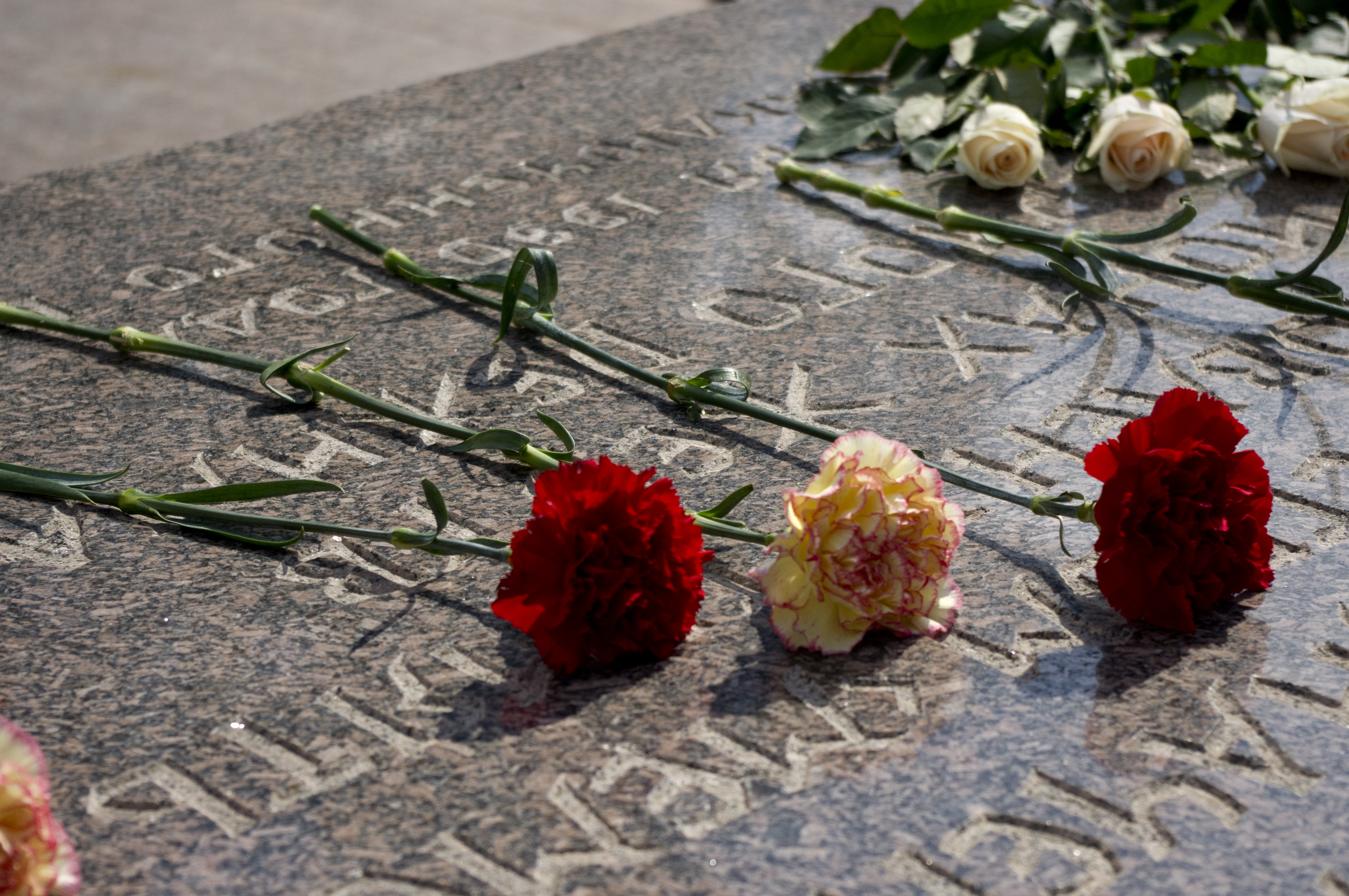
Commemoration of the deportation of Germans, 28 August 2011 in Moscow

J. Otto Pohl estimates that nearly a quarter million Germans died as a result of the 1941–1942 deportations as well as the smaller ones in 1945–1946 targeting the Soviet Germans repatriated after spending the war under German rule. Of these, 50,000 or 6 percent died in transit before reaching the destination. He writes that the deportation greatly exceeded earlier Soviet population transfers and was one of the largest ethnic cleansing operations in the twentieth century up to that time. Pohl compares it to the Armenian genocide both in scale and because the authorities sent deportees to places where it was known that they would not be able to obtain sufficient subsistence. The number of Soviet Germans who died from 1941 to 1948 is less than the number of deaths due to famine and persecution (for example, the German operation of the NKVD) between World War I and World War II. Although the forcible transfer of populations was determined to be a crime against humanity at the Nuremberg trials, Kaganovich never faced prosecution.

Various underlying motives have been proposed for the deportations, including revenge for military defeats, and economic exploitation for cheap labor and to populate resource-rich but population-sparse areas in Siberia. While some historians ultimately blame the deportations on Germany, others view them as an extension of other Soviet terror. In contrast, Pohl argues that the primary reason for the deportation was to remove Germans from the western Soviet Union, "a punitive internal deportation justified as a prophylactic measure to protect state security". He adds that though fears of collaboration were a short term consideration, in the long run the Soviet leadership believed it would benefit from permanently eliminating an economically successful minority concentrated in specific areas of strategic importance. Pohl argues that the ethnic cleansing of suspect populations was an accepted practice at the time, citing the Japanese internment in the United States and Canada, as well as Nazi deportation of Jews.

=== Connection to the Nakba ===
The deportation of Soviet Germans was invoked by Israeli politicians and figures as a model for displacing Palestinians:

"Our contemporary history has known a number of transfers ... [for instance] the U.S.S.R. arranged the transfer of one million Germans living in the Volga region and transferred them to very distant places ... one could assume that this transfer was done against the will of the transferees ... there could be possible situations that would make [Arab] population transfer desirable for both sides ... who is the socialist who is interested in rejecting the very idea before hand and stigmatising it as something unfair? Has Merhavya not been built on transfer? Were it not for many of these transfers Hashomer Hatza‘ir [which later in 1948 founded the Mapam Party] would not be residing today in Merhavya, or Mishmar Ha‘emek or other places ... and if what has been done for a settlement of Hashomer Hatza‘ir is a fair deed, why would it not be fair when it would be done on a much larger and greater scale, not just of Hashomer Hatza‘ir but for the whole of Israel?" - Berl Katznelson in 1943

== See also ==
- Population transfer in the Soviet Union
