= Koryo Saram: The Unreliable People =

2006 American documentary film

- Directed by: Y. David Chung; Matt Dibble
- Written by: Y. David Chung; Matt Dibble; Japhet Asher
- Produced by: Y. David Chung
- Narrated by: Y. David Chung
- Release date: October 29, 2006
- Running time: 60 minutes
- Countries: United States, Kazakhstan
- Languages: English, Russian, Koryo-mar

Koryo Saram: The Unreliable People is an American documentary film premiered on October 29, 2006. It was directed by Y. David Chung and Matt Dibble. The film focuses on Koryo-saram: ethnic Koreans of the former Soviet Union who were deported to Central Asia in 1937. The subtitle "The Unreliable People" refers to a phrase Joseph Stalin used to describe the Koryo-saram and other ethnic groups who were deported.

It was written by Y. David Chung, Matt Dibble, and Japhet Asher. It was produced by Y. David Chung, and executive produced by Meredith Jung-En Woo. Academic German Kim served as the historical consultant. It first premiered at the Smithsonian Institute's Sackler Gallery. It has since been shown at a number of universities in the United States.

It won the Best Documentary Award of the National Film Board of Canada in 2007.

== Synopsis ==
The film covers how conditions in the 20th century led to the Koryo-saram population in the former Soviet Union. The earliest Koreans to immigrate to Russia did so in 1863, due to drought and famine. Korea was occupied by Japan from 1910 to 1945. In 1937, Soviet leader Joseph Stalin ordered that all Korean people be moved from the Russian Far East to Central Asia.

The creators of the film visited Kazakhstan a number of times. While there, they gathered documents, newspapers, journals, photos, and footage to create the documentary. They also gathered dozens of hours of oral testimony that they both used for the documentary and released afterwards.
