= Japhet Asher =

English filmmaker (born 1961)

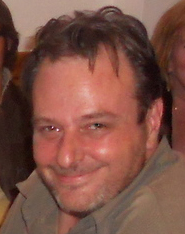
- Asher in 2011
- Born: Simeon Japhet Asher; 14 January 1961 (age 65); London, England
- Education: Tisch School of the Arts
- Occupations: Executive producer for interactive, CBBC
- Years active: 1980–present
- Employer: BBC
- Known for: Work in film and television in the United States and England
- Television: Liquid Television (creator, executive producer, creative director, writer and voice); Æon Flux (executive producer and one-time guest voice)
- Relatives: Gerald Asher (father); Jeremy Asher (brother)

Simeon Japhet Asher (born 14 January 1961) is an English film and television producer, writer and director who has worked in the United States for most of his career. Having moved back to England, he was the executive producer for interactive at CBBC, the BBC's programming strand for children, and an executive producer of the live action comedy Big Babies broadcast by that network.

Asher is also the creator and author of “The Ghostkeeper's Journal & Field Guide”, the first ever augmented reality powered novel, published in 2018 by Carlton Books. Asher is considered a pioneer in the field of augmented reality storytelling, and has won multiple awards for the books with apps he has developed in this medium.

Asher wrote and produced his first television film for the American Broadcasting Company, Peace on Borrowed Time, when he was 21 years old, during 1982; it aired the following year. The 1985 HBO documentary Soldiers in Hiding, of which Asher was a producer and writer, was nominated for an Academy Award. As a partner in the San Francisco-based studio (Colossal) Pictures during the late 1980s and 1990s he was the creator of the MTV animated showcase Liquid Television and a key figure in its execution, serving as executive producer and creative director. He was also an executive producer and writer for Æon Flux, a segment of the programme which later became its own show. Between 1995 and 1997, he was the executive vice-president of programming at Tele-TV, an ultimately abortive joint venture by three American telephone companies to provide interactive television, video on demand and internet through customers' phone lines.

== Career in film and television ==
Born in London, England, Asher attended Winchester College for five terms, before moving to San Francisco, California with his family. He graduated from New York's Tisch School of the Arts and worked extensively alongside director Malcolm Clarke during the 1980s. In 1982, when Asher was 21, the duo collaborated on a television film for the American Broadcasting Company, Peace on Borrowed Time, which aired the following year with Asher credited as writer and producer. Asher held both of these roles on two more documentaries directed by Clarke for HBO; the second of these, 1985's Soldiers in Hiding, about Vietnam veterans, was nominated for an Academy Award for Best Documentary Feature, but lost out to Broken Rainbow, a documentary about the relocation of Navajo Native Americans. Asher's sole release as a director, the television documentary Trouble on Big Mountain, also focussed on the Navajo and was released by San Francisco's KQED network in 1986.

During the late 1980s and 1990s Asher became involved in animation as a partner in the San Francisco-based production house (Colossal) Pictures, most notably as creator, executive producer and creative director of the animation showcase Liquid Television, which was first broadcast in 1991 on MTV. "We're not interested in boring TV," Asher told the Los Angeles Times soon after its première on 2 June that year; "it's zap-free TV. If you're not liking something you're watching, wait two minutes and you'll see something else ... Wait till you see Madonna doing Express Yourself." He elaborated on this in an interview with Entertainment Weekly: "It's part fun house, part laboratory experiment. It's a mix of dozens of different animation styles. There's never been a TV show quite like it before."

If Charlie Brown moved to New York's East Village, grew a goatee, and started playing bongos in a synth-pop rock band, he still wouldn't be cool enough for Liquid Television, MTV's new weekly half-hour animation series ...

— Benjamin Svetkey opens his review of Liquid Television, 14 June 1991

Liquid Television was described by Los Angeles Times reporter Lauren Litpon as "state-of-the-art animation ... unlike anything else television has to offer". It crammed about 15 unrelated, mostly animated segments into each half-hour slot at a vastly accelerated pace, linking them together with yet more animation. Violently and deliberately different from the rest of the TV schedule, it was nominated for two Primetime Emmy Awards during its four-year run, winning one, and included as one of its cartoons Æon Flux, directed by Peter Chung with Asher as an executive producer and writer. Æon Flux became a standalone series in 1992 and ran until 1995. Asher appeared as a voice actor on each of these shows, writing and performing the recurring "Psychogram" skit on Liquid Television and voicing the character "Clavius" in an episode of Æon Flux. (Note: In the DVD version of the 1995 Æon Flux episode "Utopia or Deuteranopia?" (episode 1 of series 3), Asher voices the character "Clavius". The character is voiced by Joseph Drelich in the version broadcast on TV and released on VHS.)

Despite the success of both Liquid Television and Æon Flux, Asher later came in for criticism from Mike Judge, the creator of Beavis and Butt-head, a successful animated programme initially featured on Liquid Television. Judge was being interviewed by the British magazine loaded in 1997 when the subject turned to the dislike of anything British by the title characters of Beavis and Butt-head. "You know," Judge said, "This just now occurred to me. There was this guy called Japhet Asher who was sort of in charge of Liquid Television. ... He struck me as one of these British people who come over here [to America] and people think they're smart just because they have a British accent. ... He would say things like, 'A bit of criticism, if I may, Mike.' I wonder if a lot of that is just down to him."

Asher left (Colossal) in November 1995 when he was appointed executive vice-president of programming at the newly set-up Tele-TV network, a joint venture by the Bell Atlantic, NYNEX and Pacific Telesis telephone companies to provide interactive television, video on demand and internet to customers through their copper phone wires, aiming ultimately to compete with cable and satellite providers. Asher was placed in charge of producing original programming for the service, an "unenviable task", said Tele-TV chairman-CEO Howard Stringer. However, Tele-TV failed in 1997 because of conflicts between the partner phone companies and technical difficulties regarding national co-ordination and distribution. Following this, Asher wrote for the MTV animated series Downtown in 1999 and edited stories for Roughnecks: Starship Troopers Chronicles during the same year. He wrote for the animated series Pet Alien in 2005 and for the documentary film Koryo Saram – The Unreliable People two years later. Having relocated back to England, he joined the BBC in the late 2000s as the executive producer for interactive at CBBC, the organisation's children's strand. With Asher working as one of its executive producers, the CBBC show Big Babies was nominated for a British Academy of Film and Television Arts (BAFTA) Children's Award in 2010 as one of the best comedies.

== Filmography ==
Title	Year	Type of media	Role(s)	Awards and nominations	Director(s)
Peace on Borrowed Time	1983	TV film	Producer writer	—	Malcolm Clarke
Being Homosexual	1984	TV documentary	Producer writer	—	Malcolm Clarke
Soldiers in Hiding	1985	Documentary feature film	Producer writer	Nominated for 1985 Academy Award (Note: For Best Documentary Feature)	Malcolm Clarke
Trouble on Big Mountain	1986	TV documentary	Director	—	Himself
The West: Back to the Future	1987	TV documentary	Writer	Won 1987 CINE Golden Eagle Award	Paul Fillinger
The Serpent and the Rainbow	1988	Feature film	Visual effects producer	—	Wes Craven
The Completely Mental Misadventures of Ed Grimley	1988	TV animated series	Production unit: (Colossal) Pictures	—	Various
Betty Boop's Hollywood Mystery	1989	Animated short film	Executive producer	—	George Evelyn
Brenda Starr	1989	Feature film	Visual effects producer	—	Robert Ellis Miller
Liquid Television	1991 to 1994	TV series	Creator executive producer Creative director writer (Note: Asher wrote and voiced the recurring "Psychogram" segment on Liquid Television.) voice actor	Won 1992 Primetime Emmy Award (Note: For Outstanding Individual Achievement in Graphic Design and Title Sequences) Nominated for 1993 Primetime Emmy Award (Note: For Outstanding Animated Program (For Programming One Hour or Less))	John Hays; Ed Bell
Back to the Future: The Animated Series	1991	TV animated series	Executive producer	—	Various
The Wish That Changed Christmas	1991	TV animated short	Executive producer	—	Catherine Margerin
Æon Flux	1992 to 1995	TV animated series	Executive producer writer voice actor	—	Peter Chung
Downtown	1999	TV animated series	Writer	—	Various
Roughnecks: Starship Troopers Chronicles	1999	TV animated series	Story editor	—	Various
The Weekenders	2000 to 2004	TV animated series	Writer	—	Steven Lyons
Pet Alien	2005	TV animated series	Writer	—	Andrew Young
Koryo Saram – the Unreliable People	2007	Documentary feature film	Writer	—	Y. David Chung; Matt Dibble
Big Babies	2010	TV series	Executive producer	Nominated for 2010 BAFTA Children's Award (Note: For Best Comedy)	Jon Riche
