= Jeremy Asher =

English businessman and company director

- Born: Jeremy Benjamin Gerald Asher; 16 July 1958 (age 68); London, England
- Education: London School of Economics; Harvard Business School
- Occupations: Businessman and company director
- Years active: 1980–present
- Known for: Holding prominent roles in various organisations
- Relatives: Gerald Asher (father); Japhet Asher (brother)

Jeremy Benjamin Gerald Asher (born 16 July 1958) is an English businessman and company director. He has been the chairman of Agile Energy Ltd since 2005. He has also chaired Tower Resources plc since 2011 and is senior independent director at Block Energy plc, both oil and gas exploration companies listed on the London Alternative Investment Market. In recent years he also served as a director of Tel Aviv Stock Exchange-listed Oil Refineries Ltd; London-listed Gulf Keystone Petroleum; Better Place, a venture-backed private firm providing infrastructure and services for the mass deployment of electric vehicles; and of Pacific Drilling SA, a company on the New York Stock Exchange that owns and operates ultra-deepwater drillships.

== Early life ==
Born in London in 1958, Asher attended Winchester College, where he was first scholar on the roll of 1971, and went on to earn a BSc (Econ) degree with first-class honours at the London School of Economics, then an MBA from Harvard Business School, which he received with high distinction in 1981, also being designated a Baker Scholar.

== Career ==
He joined Washington D.C.-based Strategic Planning Associates (later Mercer Management Consulting, ultimately merged into Oliver Wyman in 2007) as a consultant while still at Harvard, in 1980, and rose to become a manager before leaving in 1984. He then joined multinational commodity trader Marc Rich + Co AG (today Glencore), and by the time of his departure in 1989 had become global co-head of Global Oil Products there. In 1989, he and a partner acquired the Beta oil refinery in Wilhelmshaven, West Germany, which he developed as one of its managing directors and subsequently sold. He remained on the supervisory board at Beta Raffineriegesellschaft Wilhelmshaven mbH, the firm established to run the plant, until 1997.

In 1998, Asher became group chief executive for PA Consulting Group, based in London. During his time there, PA globalised and grew from 2,500 to just under 4,000 staff. He negotiated PA's acquisition of American-based multinational rival Hagler Bailly Inc. for about $96 million in cash in 2000, and managed the two firms' integration. He left this role in 2001, when he became chairman of SkyVision Holdings Ltd. In 2005, he founded Agile Energy Ltd, an energy investment company, where he took up the post of chairman, which he retains today. Since founding Agile, he has also sat on the boards of various other firms, including Process Systems Enterprise Ltd (between 2003 and 2008), and Gulf Keystone Petroleum and Better Place LLC (both between 2008 and 2010). He served again on the board of Gulf Keystone Petroleum in 2013–2014.

In addition to his role at Agile, he joined the board of Tower Resources plc, an oil and gas exploration company listed on London's Alternative Investment Market (AIM), in 2007, and became chairman in 2011. He combined this role with being chief executive until 2017. Today, Asher is chairman at Agile and Tower Resources plc, which holds oil and gas licenses in Cameroon, Namibia and South Africa, and senior independent director at Block Energy plc, which produces oil and gas in the Republic of Georgia. Between 1998 and 2018 he also served as a member of London Business School's global advisory council and the Engineering Advisory Board of Imperial Innovations plc, Imperial College London's commercial arm, which is listed on the AIM.

== Personal life ==
Asher's younger brother, Japhet, has been active as a film and television producer since the early 1980s.
