= Soldiers in Hiding =

1985 film

- Directed by: Malcolm Clarke
- Written by: Japhet Asher; Malcolm Clarke
- Produced by: Japhet Asher; Malcolm Clarke
- Production companies: Filmworks, Inc.
- Distributed by: HBO
- Release date: 1985
- Running time: 53 minutes
- Country: United States
- Language: English

Soldiers in Hiding is a 1985 American documentary film directed by Malcolm Clarke about Vietnam veterans. It was part of HBO's America Undercover series. It was nominated for an Academy Award for Best Documentary Feature.
