= Deportation of Koreans in the Soviet Union =

1937 forced transfer to Central Asia

Deportation of the Koreans in the Soviet Union
- Part of the population transfer in the Soviet Union and the mass operations of the NKVD
- Map of the deportation of Korean people from the Russian Far East to Soviet Central Asia Kazakh SSR, Uzbek SSR (destination of the deportees)
- Location: Primorsky Krai
- Date: September–October 1937
- Target: Soviet Koreans
- Attack type: Forcible displacement, ethnic cleansing
- Deaths: Several estimates 1) 16,500; 2) 28,200; 3) 40,000; 4) 50,000 (10–25% mortality rate)
- Victim: 172,000 Koreans deported to forced settlements in the Soviet Union
- Perpetrator: NKVD
- Motive: "Frontier cleansing", Russification, Sovietisation

Nearly 172,000 Koryo-saram (also called "Koryoin" or "Soviet Koreans") were forcibly transferred from the Russian Far East to unpopulated areas of the Kazakh SSR and the Uzbek SSR in 1937 by the NKVD on the orders of Soviet leader Joseph Stalin and Chairman of the Council of People's Commissars of the Soviet Union Vyacheslav Molotov. 124 trains were used to resettle them 6,400 kilometres (4,000 mi) to Central Asia. The reason was to stem "the infiltration of Japanese espionage into the Far Eastern Krai", as Koreans were at the time subjects of the Empire of Japan, which was the Soviet Union's rival. It has been described as part of Stalin's policy of "frontier cleansing". Estimates based on population statistics suggest that between 16,500 and 50,000 deported Koreans died from starvation, exposure, and difficulties adapting to their new environment in exile.

After Nikita Khrushchev became the Soviet premier in 1953 and undertook a process of de-Stalinization, he condemned Stalin's ethnic deportations, but did not mention Soviet Koreans among these exiled nationalities. The exiled Koreans remained living in Central Asia, integrating into the Kazakh and Uzbek society, and the new generations gradually lost their culture and language. This was the first ethnic deportation of an entire Soviet people, a method that was repeated during the population transfer in the Soviet Union during and after World War II when millions of people belonging to other ethnic groups were forcibly resettled. Modern historians and scholars view this deportation as an example of a racist policy in the USSR and ethnic cleansing, common of Stalinism, as well as a crime against humanity.

== Background ==
Emigration from the Joseon kingdom of Korea to the neighboring Primorsky Krai (ceded to Russia from China in the Amur Annexation) was recorded in the early 1860s. By the 1880s, 5,300 Koreans, distributed in 761 families, were living in 28 Cossack villages. Under the terms of a Russo-Korean treaty signed on 25 June 1884, all Koreans living in the Far East up until that date were granted citizenship and land in the Russian Empire, but all others who would arrive after 1884 were not allowed to stay longer than two years. Even the Bolshevik Revolution in 1917 did not halt migration to Russia; after 1917, many Koreans were fleeing the Japanese occupation of Korea. They mostly settled in the Posyet, Suchan and Suyfun districts. Korean migrants who had moved to Russia referred to themselves as the Koryo Saram. By the 1920s, over 100,000 Koreans lived in the Primorsky Krai. Russian peasants encouraged the migration, since leasing lands to the Koreans was profitable. Around that time, 45,000 Koreans (30%) were granted citizenship, but in 1922, 83.4% of all Soviet Korean households were landless.

On 22 November 1922, the Soviet Union annexed the Far Eastern Republic, claiming all the populace there as their citizens, including Koreans residing there. With the newly established Soviet rule, circumstances began to change. In order to discourage further immigration, 700 to 800 Koreans were deported from Okhotsk to the Empire of Japan in 1925. That same year, a proposed Korean ASSR, which would give Koreans autonomy, was rejected by Soviet officials. The 1926 Soviet Census enumerated 169,000 Koreans, 77,000 Chinese and 1,000 Japanese in the Far East Region. During the collectivization and the Dekulakization campaigns in the 1930s, more Koreans were deported from the Soviet Far East.

Due to lingering sentiments from the Russo-Japanese War and contemporary disdain for imperialist Japan, Soviet officials became increasingly suspicious of the Soviet Koreans, fearing they could remain loyal subjects of the Empire and be used by Japan for espionage or "counter-revolutionary propaganda". They also feared that an increasing presence of Koreans in the U.S.S.R. could be used by Japan to justify expansion of the boundaries of Korea.

Between 1928 and 1932, anti-Korean and anti-Chinese violence increased in the Soviet Far East, causing 50,000 Korean emigrants to flee to Manchuria and Korea. On 13 April 1928, a Soviet decree was passed stipulating that Koreans should be removed away from the vulnerable Soviet-Korean border, from Vladivostok to the Khabarovsk Oblast, and to settle Slavs in their place, mostly demobilized Red Army soldiers. An official plan intended to resettle 88,000 Koreans without citizenship north of Khabarovsk, except those who "proved their complete loyalty and devotion to Soviet power".

== Resolution No. 1428-326cc: Planning the forced relocation ==
On 17 July 1937, the Central Executive Committee of the Soviet Union issued a resolution declaring all frontiers "special defense zones", and several ethnic minorities in those border areas were considered threats to Soviet security, including Germans, Poles and Koreans. Soviet newspaper Pravda accused Koreans of being agents of Japan, while the Soviet government closed the borders and initiated a "frontier zone cleansing".

On 21 August 1937, the Council of People's Commissars of the Soviet Union adopted the decree No. 1428-326сс which ordered the deportation of the Soviet Koreans from the Far East, and determined that the process should be completed by 1 January 1938. The decree was signed by the Chairman of the Council of People's Commissars of the Soviet Union Vyacheslav Molotov and Secretary of the Central Committee Joseph Stalin. The decree stated:

The Council of People's Commissars and CC of the VCP (b) hereby order: To prevent the penetration of Japanese espionage to the Far East region undertake the following acts:

1. deport all Korean population from the border regions of the far east... and relocate it to the south—Kazakhstan region, areas near Aral Sea, Uzbek SSR
2. deportation will begin immediately and will finish by January 1, 1938
3. allow Koreans subject to relocation to take movable property, livestock
4. compensate the cost of abandoned movable and real property and crops
5. increase the frontier troops by three thousand soldiers to secure the border in the Korean relocation region

The official justification for resolution 1428-326cc was that it had been planned with the aim to "prevent the infiltration of Japanese spies into the Far East", without trying to determine how to distinguish those who were spies from those who were loyal to the state, as Stalin considered many Soviet minorities a possible fifth column. As of 29 August 1937, all Korean border guards were recalled. On 5 September 1937, 12 million roubles were urgently sent to the Far East Executive Committee to assist them in implementing this operation.

== Deportation ==
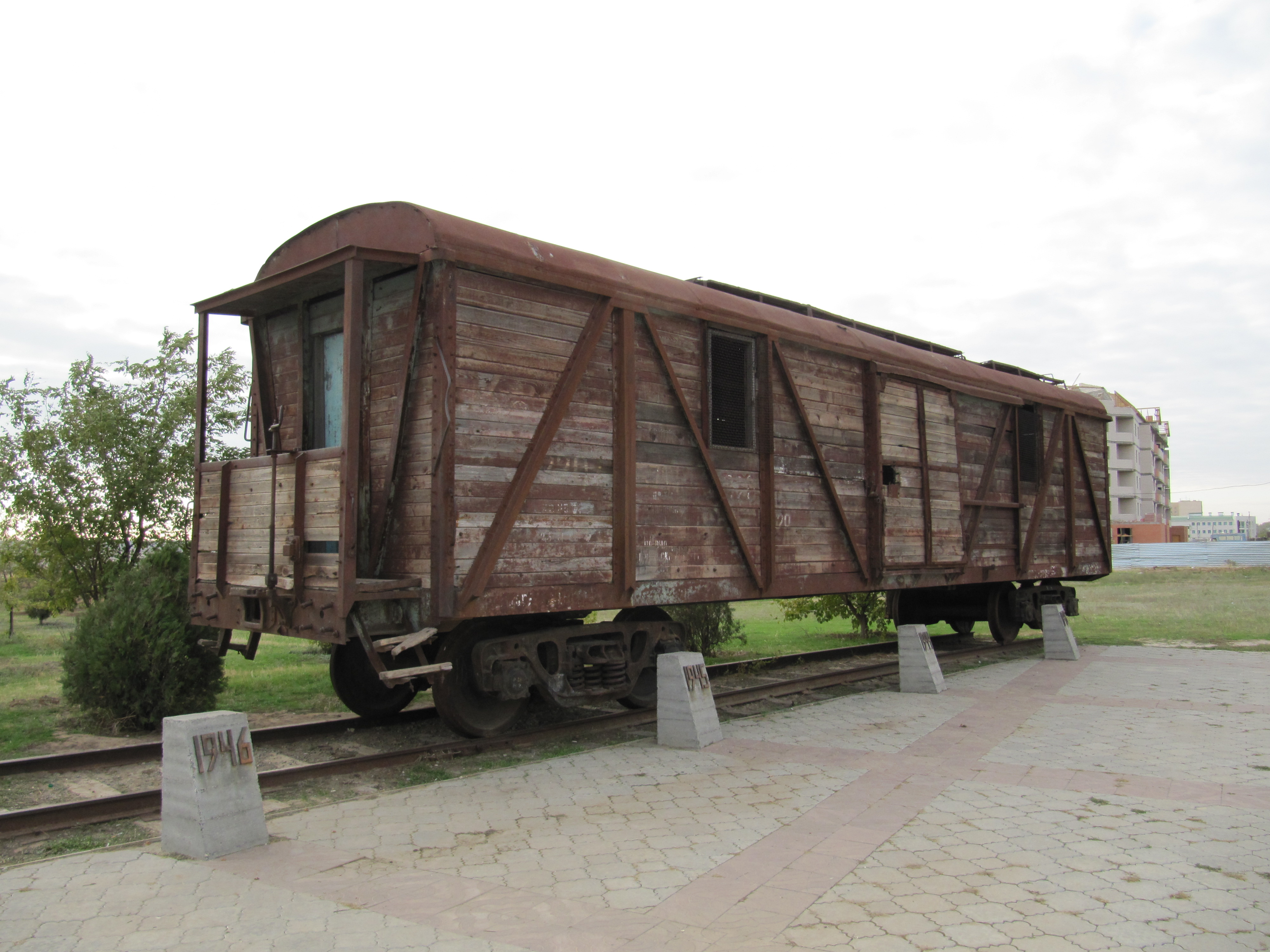
Train car used for the Soviet deportations

Even though the decree was issued in August, the Soviet officials delayed its implementation for 20 days in order to wait for the Koreans to complete the harvest. On 1 September 1937, the first group consisting out of 11,807 Koreans were deported. Koreans had to leave their movable property behind and receive "exchange receipts", but these were rushed and filled out in a way that they were not considered binding legal documents. The Soviet authorities charged the deported Koreans 5 roubles for each day of their journey. Those Koreans who did not resist the resettlement were awarded with 370 roubles. The Soviet secret police, the NKVD, would go from house to house, knock on the doors, and inform the people inside that they must gather all their belongings, personal documents, and all food they can find at home in less than half an hour and follow them. They were not given prior notice where they were being deported to.

By the end of September, 74,500 Koreans were evicted from Spassk-Dalny, Posyet, Grodekovo, Birobidzhan and other places. In the second phase of the deportation, starting from 27 September 1937, the Soviet authorities expanded their search to encompass Koreans from Vladivostok, the Buryat Autonomous Soviet Socialist Republic, the Chita Oblast and Khabarovsk Kray. The deportees were transported by railway in 124 trains. During this operation, 7,000 Soviet Chinese were also deported together with Soviet Koreans. In case of mixed marriages, if the husband was Korean, the entire family was subject to deportation. Only if the husband was non-Korean and the wife Korean was the family exempt from this order. NKVD officers were allowed to stay in the abandoned houses of the Koreans. Five to six families (25 to 30 people) were sent to each compartment of a cargo train. Their journey lasted between 30 and 40 days. The sanitation inside these trains was of poor quality. Deported Koreans had to eat, cook, sleep and excrete inside these wagons.

A correspondence sent by the NKVD official Nikolay Yezhov, dated 25 October 1937, indicated that the deportation was complete, having removed 36,442 Korean families. The only remaining Koreans, 700 settlers in Kamchatka and Okhotsk, were supposed to be deported by 1 November 1937. The correspondence also reveals that 2,500 Koreans were arrested during this operation; presumably, they were all shot because they protested moving out of their homes.

In total, 171,781 persons were deported. They were sent on a 6,400 kilometres (4,000 mi) journey in trains to the special settlements in the Kazakh and Uzbek SSR. At least 500 Koreans died as a direct result of this transfer. The corpses of the deportees who died from starvation were left behind at one of the many train stations. Instead of the planned seven, the Koreans were dispersed between 44 regions. 37,321 people were sent to the Tashkent region; 9,147 to the Samarkand region; 8,214 to the Fergana region; 5,799 to the Khwarazm region; 972 to the Namangan region, etc. Overall, 18,300 Korean households were deported to the Uzbek SSR, and 20,141 households to the Kazakh SSR. Some were resettled for a second time, as was the case of 570 Korean families who were evicted from the Kazakh SSR to the Astrakhan District to be given jobs in the fishing industry. Ultimately, approximately 100,000 Koreans were sent to the Kazakh SSR and more than 70,000 to Uzbek SSR.

In 1940, a further number of Koreans were resettled, this time from the Murmansk region to the Altai Krai. A decree signed by the chief of the Soviet secret police Lavrentiy Beria ordered that 675 families containing 1,743 people, including Germans, Poles, Chinese and Koreans, should be removed from the border regions. On 10 January 1943, a State Defense Committee resolution stipulated that 8,000 Koreans should be demobilized from the Red Army and sent to labour battalions with other Koreans in Central Asia. Sporadic deportations of any remaining Koreans continued all until 1946.

Entire districts in the Far Eastern Region were left empty. Red Army officials obtained the best buildings left behind. Even though the Soviet government planned to settle 17,100 families in their place, only 3,700 families moved there by 1939.

== Experience in exile ==
=== Arrival and distribution in kolkhozes ===
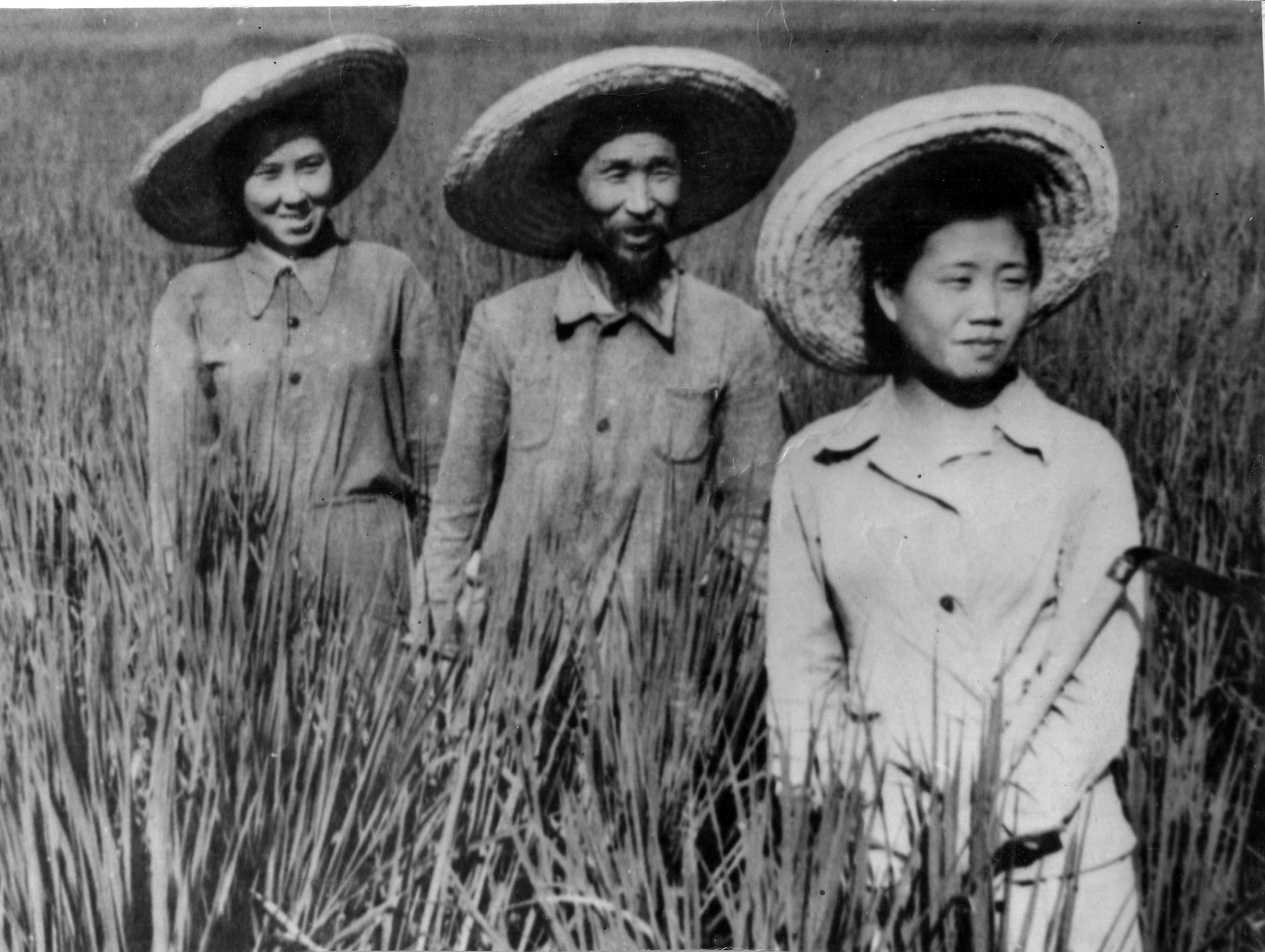
Deported Koreans from the Soviet Far East at a collective farm in the Uzbek SSR (1937)

We arrived at the railroad station on October 31. There was no shed, and we have stayed with small children for 5–6 days in the cold open air. We speak about anti-human attitude towards settlers. They still do not have a permanent home. The local authorities have no intention of dealing with Korean settlers.

— A Korean man recalling his deportation experiences.

The deportees were allowed to take livestock with them and received some compensation (on average 6,000 roubles per family) for property left behind. Upon arrival at their destination, some deportees were sent to barracks under a 24/7 supervision of armed guards. The Soviet government was often negligent towards this process of resettlement. In one instance, 4,000 Koreans arrived by train to Kostanay on 31 December 1937. Due to the winter temperatures, they spent almost a week inside the passenger car "before there was any sign of activity from local authorities". The people were dispersed in whatever buildings were at their disposal, including abandoned hospitals, prisons and warehouses.

By October 1938, 18,649 Korean households formed their own 59 kolkhozes while 3,945 joined the 205 already established kolkhozes in these areas. Some sent letters to the chairman of the kolkhozes, warning about starvation or a lack of fresh water. They also faced shortage of medicine and even employment. Many survived thanks to the kindness of Kazakh or Uzbek locals who shared food with them or gave them shelter, even though they themselves had limited amounts.

The settlers in collective farms were assigned with production of rice, vegetables, fishing and cotton. The Soviet government failed to prepare the terrain for the influx of so many resettled people, with some areas lacking building materials for construction of new houses or schools. In the Tashkent area, of the 4,151 planned two-flat houses for the deportees, only 1,800 were completed by the end of 1938, forcing many to find improvised accommodation in barracks, earthhouses and other places. Additional problems were high taxes imposed on Koreans and the looting of the material intended for the construction of their houses. Some deportees lived in houses made out of straw and mud.

=== Death toll ===
Many died of hunger, sickness, and exposure during the first years in Central Asia. Typhus and malaria were some of the causes of fatalities. Estimates based on population statistics suggest that the total number of deported Koreans who died in exile is between 16,500–28,200 and 40,000–50,000 people, resulting in a mortality rate ranging from 10% for the lower estimates, to 16.3%–25% for the higher estimates.

=== Integration ===
The NKVD and Council of People's Commissars could not agree upon the status of the deported Koreans. Formally they were neither regarded as special settlers, nor were they considered exiled since the reason for their resettlement was not repression. Finally, on 3 March 1947, MVD minister Sergei Kruglov signed a directive that allowed the banished Koreans to obtain passports, though they could only be used within Central Asia, and not for the border areas. The 1959 census enumerated 74,019 Koreans in the Kazakh SSR (0.8% of the population) and 138,453 Koreans in the Uzbek SSR (1.7% of the population). Between 1959 and 1979, the number of Koreans increased by 24% in Kazakhstan; 18% in Uzbekistan; 299% in Kyrgyzstan and 373% in Tajikistan.

== Aftermath ==
While I was living in Uzbekistan, I knew I would never be truly accepted there. People would always ask: 'Why are you here?'.

— An Uzbek Korean who moved to South Korea, 2001

This forced transfer marked the precedent of Stalin's first ethnic deportation of an entire nationality, which would become a pattern during and after World War II, when dozens of other nationalities were uprooted from their homes, amounting to 3,332,589 persons who were deported in the Soviet Union during that time. Even though the earlier de-kulakization deportations were justified as a fight against the rich peasants who were declared "class enemies", the deportation of the Koreans contradicted this Soviet policy, since they were from every class, and most of them were poor peasants from the rural areas.

Upon hearing about the resettlement, the Japanese officials lodged a complaint through their embassy in Moscow in November 1937, claiming that these Koreans were Japanese citizens, by extension of Korea as part of the Empire of Japan, and that the Soviets were not allowed to mistreat them. The Soviet officials rejected their complaint, claiming the Koreans as Soviet citizens.

After Stalin's death in 1953, the new Soviet leader Nikita Khrushchev started a process of de-Stalinization, reversing many of Stalin's policies. In his secret speech in 1956, Khrushchev condemned the ethnic deportations. However, he did not mention the deported Koreans. In 1957 and 1958, the Koreans started to petition the Soviet authorities, demanding full rehabilitation. It was not until Yuri Andropov's speech in October 1982 during his ascent to the Party General Secretary that Soviet Koreans were mentioned as one of the nationalities which were living without equal rights.

For the Koreans who were deported, the consequences of the deportation included the loss of their ability as well as the loss of their right to return to the Far East; the loss of all knowledge of their native language and the loss of all knowledge of their cultural traditions. According to the 1970 Soviet Census, between 64% and 74% of Soviet Koreans spoke Korean as their first language, but by the early 2000s, this percentage had gone down to only 10%.

On 14 November 1989, the Supreme Council of the Soviet Union declared that all of Stalin's deportations were "illegal and criminal". On 26 April 1991 the Supreme Soviet of the Russian Socialist Federal Soviet Republic, under its chairman Boris Yeltsin, followed suit and passed the law On the Rehabilitation of Repressed Peoples with Article 2 denouncing all mass deportations as "Stalin's policy of defamation and genocide". On 1 April 1993, the Russian Federation issued a decree "On the Rehabilitation of Soviet Koreans", acknowledging that their deportation was illegal and stating that they could theoretically return to the Far East.

In the 2000s, post-Soviet Koreans began to lose their cultural cohesion, because the members of the new generations of them did not speak Korean anymore, and 40% of their marriages were mixed. Around the same time, young Koreans travelled to the Russian Far East, exploring the possibility of migrating back to that region and turning it into an autonomous Korean area, but the Russian authorities and the local population did not support their efforts. Ultimately, they abandoned that idea.

Significant Korean institutions from across the Soviet Union congregated in Kazakhstan, making the republic the center of Korean intellectual life in the Soviet Union. This included the Korean-language newspaper Sŏnbong (later renamed Koryo Ilbo), theater, and the Far East Korean Pedagogical Institute, although the latter was soon reorganized as the generic Kyzylorda Pedagogical Institute (later renamed Korkyt Ata Kyzylorda University).

Some ethnic Koreans went on to become significant figures or leaders in the Soviet Union. Dozens of Koreans in Kazakhstan and Uzbekistan were designated Heroes of Socialist Labor, including chairman of a collective farm Kim Pen-Hwa, member of the Uzbek Communist Party Hwan Man-Kim, and farmer Lyubov Li. After the Nazi invasion of the Soviet Union, many Koreans were drafted into the Red Army and sent to the front. One of them, Captain Aleksandr Pavlovich Min, was awarded the title Hero of the Soviet Union, the country's highest honor. Koreans were elected to the Parliaments of the Soviet Union and Central Asian Republics and by the 1970s the number of Koreans with a college degree was double that of the general population.

According to the Korean Ministry of Foreign Affairs, in 2013, 176,411 Koreans lived in the Russian Federation, 173,832 Koreans lived in Uzbekistan, and 105,483 Koreans lived in Kazakhstan.

== Modern analysis ==
Russian historian Pavel Polian considered all of the deportations of entire ethnic groups which occurred during Stalin's rule a crime against humanity. He concluded that the real reason for the deportation was Stalin's policy of "frontier cleansing" the western and eastern regions of the USSR.

Kazakhstani Korean scholar German Kim assumes that one of the reasons for this deportation may have been Stalin's intent to oppress ethnic minorities that could have posed a threat to his socialist system or he may have intended to consolidate the border regions with China and Japan by using them as political bargaining chips. Additionally, Kim points out that 1.7 million people perished in the Kazakh famine of 1931–33, while an additional one million people fled from the Republic, causing a labour shortage in that area, which Stalin sought to compensate for by deporting other ethnicities there. Historian Jon K. Chang wrote that the Soviet deportations of Koreans (and other diaspora, deported peoples such as Germans, Finns, Greeks and many others) illustrated the fact that Russian nationalism, and essentialized views of race, that is, primordialism were both wholly carried over from the Tsarist era. These Soviet tropes and biases were transformed into a decidedly, un-Marxist Soviet "yellow peril" which the Koreans (and the Chinese) symbolized. The prevalence of racism lay in the fact that (Slavs, some Jews, Armenians and members of other ethnic groups) could be wholly or individually judged based on what class they belonged to but the Koreans could not. The Koreans could not pass as Slavs (such as Bronstein "passing" as Trotsky) without intermarrying. Scholar Vera Tolz from the University of Manchester considered this deportation of Korean civilians an example of a racist policy in the USSR. Terry Martin, a professor of Russian studies, categorized this event as an act of ethnic cleansing without an ethnic bias. Alexander Kim, Associate Professor at the Primorye State Agricultural Academy, agrees and according to his assessment, the Soviet Koreans were the first victims of ethnic repression and persecution in the Soviet Union, a violation of the state pledge of the equality of all people. Farid Shafiyev, chairman of the Baku-based Center of Analysis of International Relations, assumes that the Soviet policy has always been the Russification of border regions, especially the Asian peripheries.

=== Historiography ===
Modern historians and scholars consider this deportation an example of a racist policy which existed in the USSR and they also consider it an act of ethnic cleansing. Nonetheless, the dominant view among historians of Russia and the USSR was and remains that of Harvard's Terry Martin and his theory of "Soviet xenophobia". This theory is based on the belief that the Soviet Union ethnically cleansed the border peoples of the USSR from 1937 to 1951 (including the peoples of the Caucasus and the peoples of the Crimea) in order to remove Soviet nationalities whose political allegiances were allegedly suspect or inimical to Soviet socialism. In this view, the USSR did not practice direct negative ethnic animus or discrimination ("In neither case did the Soviet state itself conceive of these deportations as ethnic."). Political ideology of all Soviet peoples was the primary consideration. Martin stated that the various deportations of the Soviet border peoples were simply the "culmination of a gradual shift from predominantly class-based terror" which began during collectivization (1932–33) to "national/ethnic" based terror (1937). Accordingly, Martin also claimed that the deportations of the nationalities were "ideological, not ethnic. They were spurred by an ideological hatred and a suspicion of foreign capitalist governments, not by national hatred of non-Russians." His theory entitled "Soviet xenophobia" paints the USSR and the Stalinist regime as having practiced and carried out in politics, education and Soviet society relatively pure socialism and Marxist practices. This view has been supported by several of the major historians of the USSR, those in Russian and even Korean studies. Alyssa Park, in her archival work, found very little evidence that Koreans had proven or were able to prove their loyalties beyond a shadow of a doubt, thus 'necessitating' deportation from the border areas.

In contrast, the views of J. Otto Pohl and Jon K. Chang affirm the belief that the Soviet Union, its officials and everyday citizens produced and carried over (from the Tsarist era) racialized (primordialist) views, policies and tropes regarding their non-Slavic peoples. Norman M. Naimark believed that the Stalinist "nationalities deportations" were forms of national-cultural genocide. At the very least, the deportations changed the cultures, ways of life and world views of the deported peoples because the majority of them were sent to Soviet Central Asia and Siberia.

"Primordialism" is simply another way of saying ethnic chauvinism or racism because the said "primordial" peoples or ethnic groups are seen as possessing "permanent" traits and characteristics, which they pass on from one generation to the next. Chang and Martin both believe that the Stalinist regime took a turn towards primordializing nationality in the 1930s. After the "primordialist turn" by the Stalinist regime in the mid-1930s, the Soviet Greeks, Finns, Poles, Chinese, Koreans, Germans, Crimean Tatars and other deported peoples were all seen as being loyal to their "titular" nations (or they were seen as being loyal to non-Soviet polities) because in the 1930s, the Soviet state considered nationality (ethnicity) and political loyalty (ideology) primordial equivalents. Thus, it was not a surprise when the regime resorted to "deportation".

In Martin's view, the Soviet regime was not deporting the various diaspora peoples because of their nationality. Rather, nationality (ethnicity or phenotype) served as a referent or a signifier for the political ideology of the deported peoples. Amir Weiner's argument is similar to Martin's argument, substituting "territorial identity" for "xenophobia". The "Soviet xenophobia" argument also does not hold up semantically. Xenophobia is the fear of invasion or loss of territory and influence to foreigners by natives. The "Russians" and other Eastern Slavs are coming into the territory of the natives (the deported peoples) who were simply Soviet national minorities. They were not foreign elements. The Russian empire was not the "native" state, polity or government in the Russian Far East, the Caucasus and many other regions of the deported peoples. Koguryo followed by Parhae/Balhae/Bohai were the first states of the Russian Far East. John J. Stephan called the "erasure" of Chinese and Korean history (state-formation, cultural contributions, peoples) to the region by the USSR and Russia the intentional "genesis of a 'blank spot.'"

All of the Stalinist orders for the "total deportation" of the thirteen nationalities (from 1937 to 1951) list each of the peoples by ethnicity as well as by a charge of treason. Soviet law required that one's guilt or innocence (for treason) should be determined individually and it should also be determined in a court of law prior to sentencing (per the 1936 Constitution). Finally, on the other end of the "primordial" spectrum, the Eastern Slavs (Russians, Ukrainians, Belarusians) were inherently seen as being more loyal and more representative of the Soviet people. According to Chang, this is a deviation from socialism and Marxist–Leninism.

== Relationship with contemporary South Korea ==
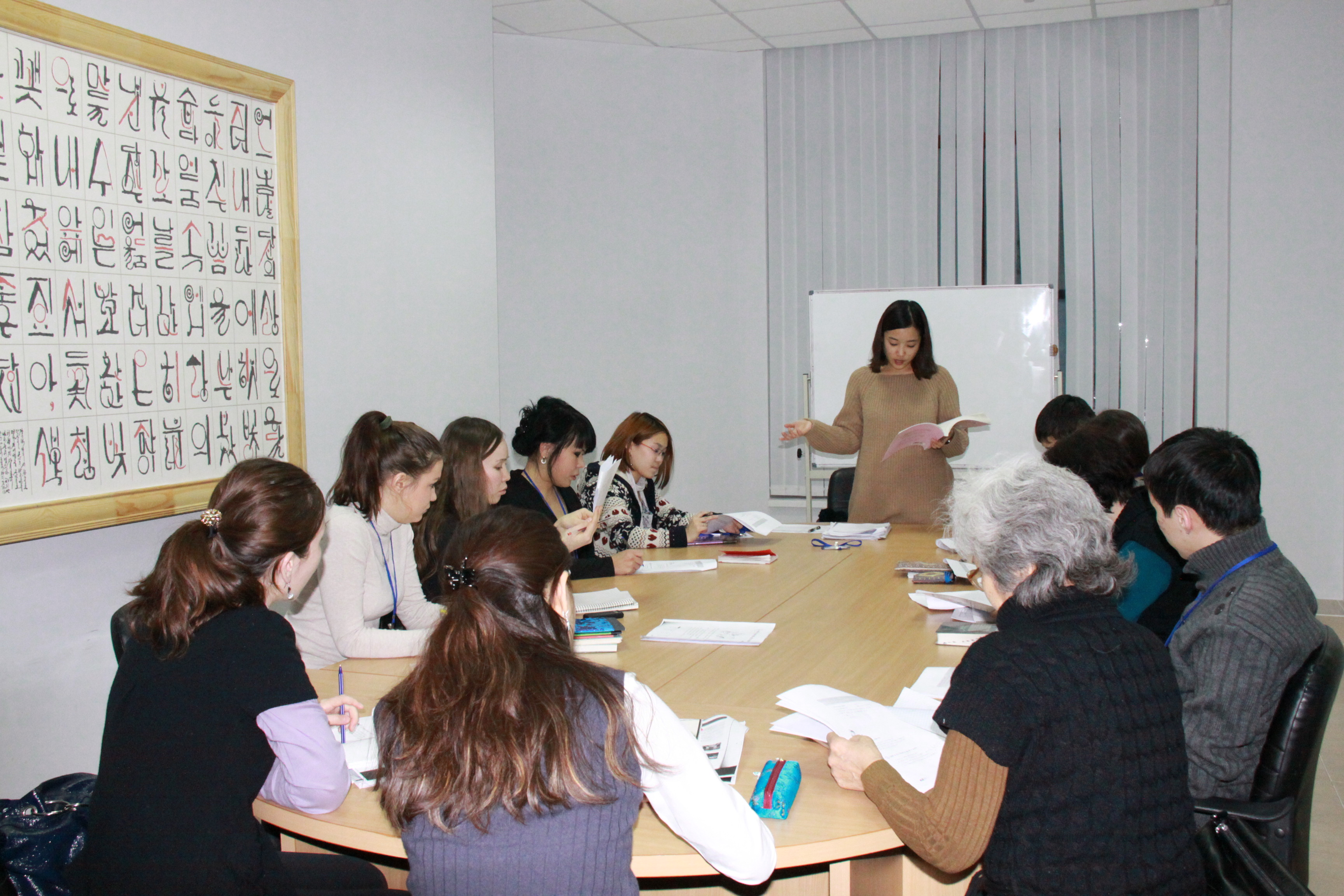
Learning Korean at the Korean Center in Kazakhstan in 2010

Following the dissolution of the Soviet Union, several Koreans in Central Asia travelled to South Korea to visit their distant relatives, but most of them declined to permanently move to South Korea, citing cultural differences, and there was never a major movement for the repatriation of Soviet Koreans.

Teachers from South Korea have traveled to Central Asia and Russia to teach the Korean language for free at schools and universities which are located there. K-pop music inspired a new generation of Central Asian Koreans to learn Korean. Korean films and dramas were popular in Uzbekistan in the 2000s, especially among the local Korean population. Due to limited economic opportunities in independent Uzbekistan, some local Koreans moved to South Korea. The bilateral turnover between Kazakhstan and Korea amounted to $505.6 million in 2009. In 2014, Seoul City established the Seoul Park in Tashkent in an attempt to forge cultural ties between South Korea and Uzbekistan. In July 2017, on the 80th anniversary of the deportation, Tashkent officials unveiled a monument to the Korean victims. The ceremony was attended by Seoul's Mayor Park Won-soon.

== See also ==
- Deportation of the Chechens and Ingush
- Deportation of the Crimean Tatars
- Deportation of the Kalmyks
- Deportation of the Karachays
- Deportation of the Meskhetian Turks
- Internment of German Americans
- Internment of Italian Americans
- Internment of Japanese Americans
- Internment of Japanese Canadians
- Mass operations of the NKVD
- Human rights in the Soviet Union
- Political repression in the Soviet Union
- Volga Germans#Soviet deportation

== Bibliography ==
- Human Rights Watch (1991). "Punished Peoples" of the Soviet Union: The Continuing Legacy of Stalin's Deportations" (PDF). New York City. LCCN 91076226. OCLC 25705762.
- Abylkhozhin, Zhulduzbek; Akulov, Mikhail; Tsay, Alexandra (2021). Stalinism in Kazakhstan: History, Memory, and Representation. Lanham: Lexington Books. ISBN 9781793641632. LCCN 2021933814.
- Adams, Margarethe (2020). Steppe Dreams: Time, Mediation, and Postsocialist Celebrations in Kazakhstan. Pittsburgh: University of Pittsburgh Press. ISBN 9780822987505. OCLC 1223496467.
- Bugay, Nikolai (1996). The Deportation of Peoples in the Soviet Union. New York City: Nova Science Publishers. ISBN 9781560723714. OCLC 36402865.
- Chang, Jon K. (2014). "Tsarist continuities in Soviet nationalities policy: A case of Korean territorial autonomy in the Soviet Far East, 1923–1937". Eurasia Studies Society of Great Britain & Europe Journal. 3: 32–33.
- Chang, Jon K. (2018a). Burnt by the Sun: The Koreans of the Russian Far East. Honolulu: University of Hawaii Press. ISBN 9780824876746. LCCN 2015046032.
- Chang, Jon K. (2018b). "East Asians in Soviet Intelligence and the Chinese-Lenin School of the Russian Far East". Eurasia Border Review. 9 (1): 64. ISSN 1884-9466.
- Chang, Jon K. (2019). "Ethnic Cleansing and Revisionist Russian and Soviet History". Academic Questions. 32 (2): 263–270. doi:10.1007/s12129-019-09791-8 (inactive 1 July 2025). S2CID 150711796.
- Drobizheva, Leokadiya (2015). Ethnic Conflict in the Post-Soviet World: Case Studies and Analysis. Armonk, N.Y.: M.E. Sharpe. ISBN 9781317470991. LCCN 95035962.
- Ellman, Michael (2002). "Soviet Repression Statistics: Some Comments" (PDF). Europe-Asia Studies. 54 (7): 1151–1172. doi:10.1080/0966813022000017177. JSTOR 826310. S2CID 43510161. Archived from the original (PDF) on 27 April 2018.
- Feldbrugge, Ferdinand; Sivakoff, Natasha; Avilov, Gainan (1995). Russian Federation Legislative Survey: June 1990 – December 1993. Dordrecht: Martinus Nijhoff Publishers. ISBN 9780792332435.
- Hoffmann, David (2011). Cultivating the Masses: Modern State Practices and Soviet Socialism, 1914-1939. Ithaca; London: Cornell University Press. ISBN 9780801462849. LCCN 2019725724.
- Jo, Ji-Yeon O. (2017). Homing: An Affective Topography of Ethnic Korean Return Migration. Honolulu: University of Hawaii Press. ISBN 9780824872519. LCCN 2017017760.
- Kho, Songmoo (1987). Koreans in Soviet Central Asia. Vol. 61 of Studia Orientalia. Finnish Oriental Society. ISBN 9789519380056. ISSN 0039-3282.
- Kiernan, Ben (2007). Blood and Soil: A World History of Genocide and Extermination from Sparta to Darfur. New Haven, Connecticut: Yale University Press. p. 511. ISBN 9780300100983. OCLC 2007001525.
- Kim, Alexander (2012). "The Repression of Soviet Koreans during the 1930s". The Historian. 74 (2): 267–285. doi:10.1111/j.1540-6563.2012.00319.x. JSTOR 24455386. S2CID 142660020.
- Kim, German (2003). "Koryo Saram, or Koreans of the Former Soviet Union: In the Past and Present" (PDF). Amerasia Journal. 29 (3): 23–29. doi:10.17953/amer.29.3.xk2111131165t740. S2CID 143141060.
- Kim, German (2003b). Korean Diaspora in Kazakhstan: Question of Topical Problems for Minorities in Post-Soviet Space (PDF) (Report). S2CID 199386943.
- Kim, German (2009). Ethnic Entrepreneurship of Koreans in the USSR and post Soviet central Asia (PDF) (Report). Institute of Developing Economies, Japan External Trade Organization. S2CID 142290323.
- Martin, Terry (1998). "The Origins of Soviet Ethnic Cleansing" (PDF). The Journal of Modern History. 70 (4): 813–861. doi:10.1086/235168. JSTOR 10.1086/235168. S2CID 32917643.
- Martin, Terry (1999). "Modernization or neo-traditionalism?: Ascribed nationality and Soviet primordialism". In Fitzpatrick, Sheila (ed.). Stalinism: New Directions. New York: Routledge. pp. 348–367. ISBN 9780415152334.
- Naimark, Norman (2010). Stalin's Genocides. Princeton, N. J.: Princeton University Press. ISBN 9780691152387. LCCN 2010019063.
- Pai, Hyung Il (2000). Constructing "Korean" Origins: A Critical Review of Archaeology, Historiography, and Racial Myth in Korean State-Formation Theories. Cambridge: Harvard University Press. ISBN 9780674002449.
- Park, Alyssa M. (2019). Sovereignty experiments: Korean migrants and the building of borders in northeast Asia, 1860-1945. Ithaca: Cornell University Press. ISBN 9781501738371. LCCN 2019001070.
- Parrish, Michael (1996). The Lesser Terror: Soviet State Security, 1939-1953. Westport, Connecticut: Greenwood Publishing Group. ISBN 9780275951139. OCLC 630860745.
- Perovic, Jeronim (2018). From Conquest to Deportation: The North Caucasus under Russian Rule. London: Oxford University Press. ISBN 9780190934675. LCCN 2017278194.
- Pohl, J Otto (1999). Ethnic Cleansing in the USSR,1937-1949. Westport: Greenwood Press. ISBN 0313309213.
- Polian, Pavel (2004). Against Their Will: The History and Geography of Forced Migrations in the USSR. Budapest; New York City: Central European University Press. ISBN 9789639241688. LCCN 2003019544.
- Rywkin, Michael (1994). Moscow's Lost Empire. Armonk, N.Y.: M.E. Sharpe. ISBN 9781315287713. LCCN 93029308.
- Saul, Norman E. (2014). Historical Dictionary of Russian and Soviet Foreign Policy. Lanham, Maryland: Rowman & Littlefield. ISBN 9781442244375. LCCN 2014030179.
- Shafiyev, Farid (2018). Resettling the Borderlands: State Relocations and Ethnic Conflict in the South Caucasus. Montréal: McGill-Queen's Press. ISBN 9780773553729. LCCN 2018379019.
- Statiev, Alexander (2005). "The Nature of Anti-Soviet Armed Resistance, 1942-44: The North Caucasus, the Kalmyk Autonomous Republic, and Crimea". Kritika: Explorations in Russian and Eurasian History. 6 (2): 285–318. doi:10.1353/kri.2005.0029. S2CID 161159084.
- Stephan, John J. (1994). The Russian Far East: A History. Stanford: Stanford University Press. ISBN 9780804727013.
- Tikhonov, Vladimir (2015). Modern Korea and Its Others: Perceptions of the Neighbouring Countries and Korean Modernity. London: Routledge. ISBN 9781317518624. LCCN 2015021761.
- Tolz, Vera (1993). "New Information about the Deportation of Ethnic Groups in the USSR during World War 2". In Garrard, John; Healicon, Alison (eds.). World War 2 and the Soviet People: Selected Papers from the Fourth World Congress for Soviet and East European Studies. New York City: Springer. ISBN 9781349227969. LCCN 92010827.
- Ubiria, Grigol (2015). Soviet Nation-Building in Central Asia: The Making of the Kazakh and Uzbek Nations. London: Routledge. ISBN 9781317504351. OCLC 1124526905.
- Weiner, Amir (2002). "Nothing but Certainty". Slavic Review. 61 (1): 44–53. doi:10.2307/2696980. JSTOR 2696980. S2CID 159548222.
- Weitz, Eric D. (2015). A Century of Genocide: Utopias of Race and Nation. Princeton: Princeton University Press. ISBN 9780691165875. LCCN 2015930402.
- Wong, Tom (2015). Rights, Deportation, and Detention in the Age of Immigration Control. Stanford, CA: Stanford University Press. ISBN 9780804793063. LCCN 2014038930.
