= Gerald Asher =

English wine personality

- Born: Gerald Albert Asher; 18 August 1932 (age 94); London, England
- Occupations: Wine writer; formerly wine merchant
- Years active: 1950–present
- Known for: Widely acclaimed authority on wine; wine editor at Gourmet magazine for 30 years
- Relatives: Jeremy Asher (son, b. 1958); Japhet Asher (son, b. 1961)

Gerald Albert Asher (born 18 August 1932) is an English wine personality based since 1974 in San Francisco, California. Initially a wine merchant and importer, today, he is a wine writer.

Born in London and raised partly in rural Essex because of the Blitz, Asher's career in wine began in 1950, when he took a part-time job at a wine retailer in London's Shepherd Market. He founded his own merchant house, Asher, Storey, and Co, in 1955 to import rare and lesser-known French wines to Britain. Active until 1970, the firm was widely seen as ground-breaking for its introduction to the British market of several previously obscure wines that proceeded to become popular. In 1971, Asher relocated to New York to take up a senior position at Austin, Nichols, and Co, which imported Bordeaux-classed wines to the United States. The next year he also became wine editor at Gourmet magazine, a post he would hold for the next three decades, writing the "Wine Journal" column, which eventually became monthly. In 1974, he received the Mérite agricole from the French government for his contributions to French agriculture.

He moved the same year to San Francisco, where he became head of the Monterey Wine Company. He writes that he had "a topsy-turvy introduction to California wine," having never tasted any before a 1967 visit, but he soon began championing it, organising the annual California Vintners Barrel Tasting Dinner along with Paul Kovi and Tom Margittai of New York's Four Seasons Restaurant. The barrel tasting, which started in 1976, played an important role in building the image and understanding of California wines on the East Coast of the United States and, over the next decade, became seen by critics as the wine event of the year. Asher started the Mosswood Wine Company in 1978 within the McKesson Corporation and headed it until 1987 when McKesson sold off its interests in wine and spirits to concentrate on pharmaceuticals. Asher took early retirement to focus solely on his wine writing, which he continues today.

He retained the post of wine editor at Gourmet until 2002, and thereafter contributed a selection of wines to each issue until the magazine discontinued in 2009. Many of his wine essays from Gourmet have been republished in book form; five volumes of these columns have been published, most recently A Carafé of Red in 2012. Asher's writing and knowledge of wine are both acclaimed, with British wine critic Jancis Robinson calling him "America's most elegant wine writer". James Beard, an American chef and food writer, says Asher's writing "makes one feel that one is sitting in a room with Gerald, enjoying his ... awesome knowledge and expertise in the world of wine." Asher has received many accolades for his writing and work with wine during his life. He was inducted into the California Vintners' Hall of Fame by the Culinary Institute of America in 2009.

== Biography ==
=== Early life ===
Gerald Asher was born in London in 1932. The family moved to rural Essex at the onset of the Blitz, and Asher was partly raised there, attending Westcliff High School for Boys in Westcliff-on-Sea.

=== First steps into wine ===
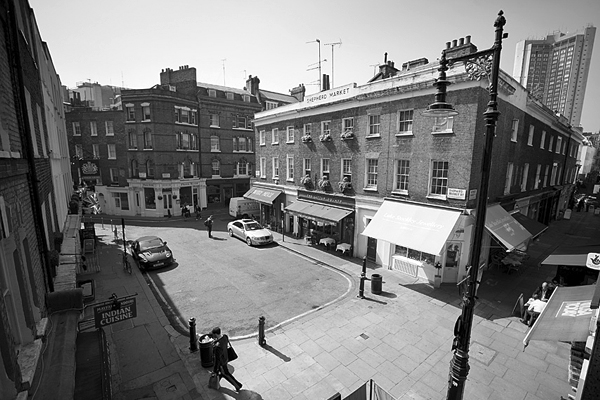
Shepherd Market, where Asher's career in wine began in 1950

Asher entered the wine industry in 1950, at the age of 18, when he took a part-time job assisting a wine retailer in Shepherd Market, between Curzon Street and Piccadilly in Mayfair, Central London. Within a year he had taken a full-time position with a small wine distributor, and by 1952 he was engaged by Blumenthal & Co, a major wine importer. Sponsored by Blumenthal, he attended tastings and lectures held by the Wine Trade Club at the Worshipful Company of Vintners in London, and in 1953 a scholarship allowed him to spend time working and studying in Jerez, the Spanish region that produces Sherry. Further such scholarships over the next two years despatched Asher to Burgundy in eastern France, then the Rheingau wine region in West Germany.

=== Asher, Storey and Co ===
In 1955, aged 23, Asher founded his own London merchant house, Asher, Storey and Co, to import rare and lesser-known French wines to Britain. The new firm was regarded as ground-breaking, and was for a long time unique in the British market. A 1983 Punch retrospective described its formation as "a breeze of change through the wine trade here [in Britain] and the trade of writing about wine." Many of the wines the firm introduced to British consumers, including Beaumes de Venises, Arbois, Bandol, Chateau Grillet, Cahors and others, were considered utterly unknown when the company began, but soon became well known and popular. By December 1969, The Observer was describing the company as "famous for its list of the lesser-known wines of France: wines from the Loire, and the Jura, from Provence and from Savoy."

=== New York ===
Asher wound up Asher, Storey in 1971, when he moved to New York City to become vice-president and National Wine Sales Manager at Austin, Nichols and Co, perhaps better known as the distiller of Wild Turkey bourbon whiskey, but also an American importer of Bordeaux-classed wines from France. He joined the French wine committee of the U.S. National Association of Wine Importers, and became chairman of the Champagne Importers' Association. Around this time he also became interested in California wine, which he had first encountered during his first visit to San Francisco in 1967. In 1972, he was invited by Jane Montant of Gourmet magazine to start contributing essays on a periodical basis as the journal's Wine Editor, a role he would hold for the next three decades. Two years later, he was awarded the Mérite agricole by the government of France for his contributions to French agriculture.

=== California ===
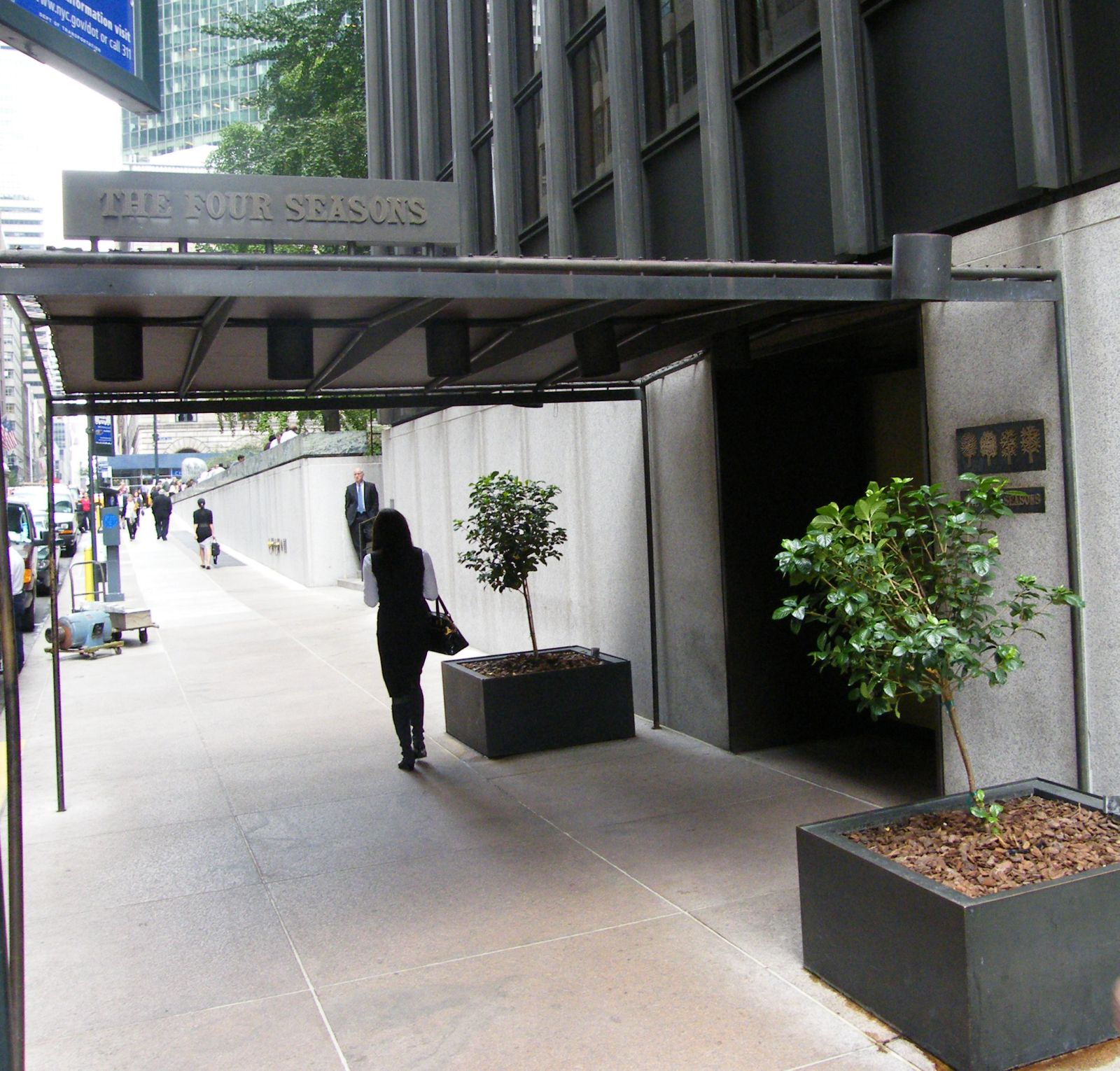
The Four Seasons Restaurant in New York City was the original venue for the annual California Vintners Barrel Tasting Dinner, which Asher was instrumental in starting and organising, from 1976 to 1985.

Asher moved to San Francisco in 1974 to head the Monterey Wine Company, a joint venture between the McKesson Corporation and the McFarlane family to market The Monterey Vineyard's wines. He retained this role until 1976. He writes that he had "a topsy-turvy introduction to California wine", having never tasted any before his 1967 visit, but soon came to regard it as on a par with that from France. Surprised that wine from California was, in his own words, "more exotically rare in New York than many European" wines, he hit upon the idea of holding an annual tasting of California wine in New York, using as models the Paulée de Meursault tasting of Burgundy wine and its grander cousin, the Paulée de Paris held at Taillevent, with "the same elegant context ... but with an American flavour".

Asher approached several Californian growers with this idea, but most were hesitant to take part. The idea became more real when the winemakers Karl Wente and Robert Mondavi agreed to participate. Paul Kovi and Tom Margittai of the prestigious Four Seasons Restaurant in Manhattan agreed to organise the practicalities of such an event in return for Asher's coordination of the California wineries' contributions. The first annual California Vintners Barrel Tasting Dinner was held at The Four Seasons in 1976, and soon became hugely popular; though there were only 228 places available for the 1978 tasting, over 2,000 people tried to buy tickets.

Asher was vice-president of "21" Brands, a wine and spirits company within the McKesson Corporation, between 1976 and 1978. He then started the Mosswood Wine Company within the McKesson structure to import and distribute European wine across the United States. Meanwhile, Asher's annual California barrel tasting event in New York became highly acclaimed in the wine world; by 1985, it was being described in newspaper columns as the American wine industry's "most prestigious social event". "Everybody who is anybody in the world of food and wine is invited to the annual California Vintners Barrel Tasting Dinner," Ruth Riechl wrote for the Los Angeles Times that year; "Ten years ago it was unclear whether anybody would even show up for the first dinner, held at the Four Seasons. This year the only problem was which one of the 10 people eager to fill each seat would[.]" "Invitations are as scarce as Manhattan taxis at rush hour," wrote Chicago Tribune columnist Kristine Curry.

Following the 1985 event, described by two wine writers as "the best ever", the annual barrel tasting moved to California. Since it was still generally considered a runaway success in New York, this came as a surprise to many, and Margittai admitted he was sad to see it go: "This is our pride and joy," he said, "but the barrel tasting needs to go home". The move was in part because of the event's popularity; so many people sought places each year that the restaurant was having to refuse tickets to some of its regular customers. The venue used in 1986, San Francisco's Stanford Court Hotel, could accommodate twice as many guests. "Woody Allen may think that going West and dying are the same thing," Asher explained, "but we're going to prove him wrong." The first barrel tasting in San Francisco was also considered a success by most who attended, with the main difference being the atmosphere, which Barbara Ensrud, a wine writer who had attended every barrel tasting so far, said was "a lot more relaxed than it ever was in New York."

=== Writing full-time ===
Long ago, during my apprenticeship in the wine trade, I learned that wine is more than the sum of its parts, and more than an expression of its physical origin. The real significance of wine as the nexus of just about everything became clearer to me when I started writing about it. ... Wine, I found, draws on everything and leads everywhere.

— Extract from Asher's introduction to A Carafé of Red, written in 2011

In 1987, McKesson sold off its wine and spirits operations so it could focus on pharmaceuticals. Aged 55, Asher took early retirement, and began to concentrate on his wine writing. His contributions to Gourmet magazine, which had evolved into a bi-monthly column called the "Wine Journal", now became monthly. Many of Asher's "Wine Journal" entries have been republished in book form as On Wine (1982), Vineyard Tales (1996), The Pleasures of Wine (2002), A Vineyard in My Glass (2011), and A Carafé of Red (2012). In 1996, he wrote the Wine Journal, published as a cellar book by HarperCollins. A number of the Gourmet columns were translated and published in the Japanese version of Playboy magazine, and in 1997 some of these were published in translation as The Secret World of Wine by Shueisha of Tokyo. Asher stopped writing for Gourmet in February 2002, but he continued to contribute a selection of wines to the monthly menu published in each issue until the magazine discontinued in November 2009.

In addition to the many accolades he has won for his writing and work in the international wine trade—including "Wine Writer of the Year" from Wine & Vines magazine in 1984, a 1990 literature achievement award from the American Institute of Wine and Food, the San Francisco Wine Appreciation Guild's Literary Award for 2000, and the 2005 Journalism award from the New York-based European Wine Council—Asher was inducted into the California Vintners' Hall of Fame at the Culinary Institute of America in St. Helena, California in 2009.

Asher is generally considered a highly respected authority in the field of wine, and has received acclaim throughout his career for his expertise and writing style, which is widely held to be elegant and enjoyable. In her 1997 book Tasting Pleasure, British wine critic Jancis Robinson calls Asher "America's most elegant wine writer". S. Irene Virbila of the Los Angeles Times gave A Carafé of Red a very positive review, describing Asher as a "wonderful prose stylist ... His wide-ranging, astute appreciation is where it's at." In a glowing review of On Wine (1982), the American chef and food writer James Beard called the book "a delight". "Reading it makes one feel that one is sitting in a room with Gerald, enjoying his personal views, his prejudices, his delightful sense of humour and his appreciation of life," Beard elaborated; "not to mention his awesome knowledge and expertise in the world of wine."

== Publications ==
Collections of Gourmet "Wine Journal" works

- Asher, Gerald (1982). On Wine. New York: Random House. ISBN 9780394527376.
- Asher, Gerald (1996). Vineyard Tales. San Francisco: Chronicle Books. ISBN 9780811812672.
- Asher, Gerald (1997). The Secret World of Wine (in Japanese). Trans. Tsukahara M., Y. Gohda. Tokyo: Shueisha. ISBN 9784087603019.
- Asher, Gerald (2002). The Pleasures of Wine. San Francisco: Chronicle Books. ISBN 9780811834971.
- Asher, Gerald (2011). A Vineyard in My Glass. Berkeley, California: University of California Press. ISBN 9780520270336.
- Asher, Gerald (2012). A Carafé of Red. Berkeley, California: University of California Press. ISBN 9780520270329.

Others

- Asher, Gerald (March 1996). Wine Journal: A Wine Lover's Album for Cellaring and Tasting. New York: HarperCollins. ISBN 978-0002251501.

== Notes and references ==
Notes

Journal and newspaper articles

- Asher, Gerald (23 October 1972). "The Best from the West: California Wines". New York: 74–76. ISSN 0028-7369.
- Beard, James A. (8 December 1982). "Asher's wine book bubbles with delightful ideas". Reading Eagle. Reading, Pennsylvania. p. 38.
- Bespaloff, Alexis (10 April 1978). "Top of the Barrel, Bottom of the Bottle". New York: 65–66. ISSN 0028-7369.
- Bespaloff, Alexis (6 May 1985). "Buying and Cellaring". New York: 88–89. ISSN 0028-7369.
- Curry, Kristine N. (4 April 1985). "Wine Takes A Back Seat To Vintage Crowd at Annual Four Seasons". Chicago Tribune.
- Dias Blue, Anthony (17 April 1985). "Annual 'barrel tasting' is wine's rite of spring". Evening Independent. St. Petersburg, Florida: 12–B.
- Reichl, Ruth (7 April 1985). "N.y. Barrel Tasting Puts The Cork on an Era". Los Angeles Times.
- Reichl, Ruth (13 April 1986). "Go West, Young Barrel Taster". Los Angeles Times.
- Virbila, S. Irene (27 July 2012). "Bedside wine reading: 'A Carafe of Red' from Gerald Asher". Los Angeles Times.
- "Big and hearty is the Asher formula". The Observer. London: 34. December 1969.

Online sources

- "Speaker Biographies: Gerald Asher". St Helena, California: The Symposium for Professional Wine Writers at Napa Valley. Archived from the original on 10 December 2011.

Bibliography

- Asher, Gerald (2012). A Carafé of Red. Berkeley, California: University of California Press. ISBN 9780520270329.
- Cooper, Derek (1970). The Beverage Report. London: Routledge.
- Johnson, Hugh (1983). Hugh Johnson's Modern Encyclopedia of Wine. New York: Simon & Schuster.
- Robinson, Jancis (1997). Tasting Pleasure: Confessions of a Wine Lover. New York: Viking Press. ISBN 9780670854233.
- Business Week. Issues 2370–2378. New York: McGraw-Hill. 1975.
- Punch. Volume 284. London. 1983.
