= German Kim =

Kazakhstani academic (born 1953)

German Nikolaevich Kim (Russian: Герман Николаевич Ким; Korean: 게르만 킴; RR: Gereuman Kim; born 16 July 1953) is a Kazakhstani scholar. A Koryo-saram by birth, he is a director of the Institute for Asian Studies at Al-Farabi University, Almaty.

== Biography ==
=== Early life ===
Kim was born 16 July 1953 in Ushtobe, Taldy-Kurgan Oblast, Kazakh Soviet Socialist Republic, one of three sons of Nikolai Kim (also known by his Korean name Kim Dyunbin), a safety engineer and premises manager at the Korean Theatre of Kazakhstan. He jokingly refers to his hometown as the "Korean capital" of the former Soviet Union. He entered Kazakh National University (now known as Al-Farabi University) in 1971 as a student of world history and German language; after his graduation in 1977, he found work as a teacher of German, which he continued until the mid-eighties.

=== Decision to study Koryo-saram history ===
In 1985, with the onset of perestroika and glasnost, it became permitted for the first time to speak openly of the deportation of Koreans in the Soviet Union and other tragedies which had afflicted the Koryo-saram. This piqued Kim's interest in the history of his ancestors, and in 1987, he returned to Kazakh National University as a doctoral candidate, writing his thesis on the topic of "Socio-Cultural Development of Koreans in Kazakhstan in 1946–1966"; after graduation, he continued his work in the field of Koryo-saram and Korean diaspora studies.

=== Other activities ===
German Kim has written and edited a large number of books and papers published internationally. Of those, three volumes of the "History of Korean Immigration" are particularly noteworthy on the history of the Korean Diaspora. Two of his books published in Korean were awarded by the commissions of the South Korean Ministry of Culture for the best book in both 2006 and 2014.

He presented papers in over 150 international conferences, seminars and workshops in Asia, North and South America, and Europe. He is a member of the International Commission on Sources of the History of Korea; Korean Studies Associations in Europe, Asia and USA. He gave over 50 public lectures in the top universities internationally. Since 1996 he is the Chief-editor of the journal Newsletter of Korean Studies in Central Asia and is a member of the editorial board of the journals Acta Koreana (Los Angeles), Korea Forum (New York), International Area Review (Seoul); “Studies of the culture of Koreans abroad” (Institute for the studies of the Culture of Koreans abroad, Kongju National University); Journal of Contemporary Korean Studies (National Museum of Korean Contemporary History, Seoul); Editorial Board of the Journal “Studies of Koreans Abroad” of the Association for the Studies of Koreans Abroad (Seoul).

Kim received research and field work grants from the Korea Research Foundation (1991, 2001), Korea Foundation (1992, 2004), British Academy (1992), Soros Foundation (1998), Japan Museum of Anthropology in Osaka (2002), IREX (2003), Academy of Korean Studies (2005, 2006), A. Mellon Global Foundation (2006), POSCO (2007), IDE JETRO (2008) and Center for Slavic Studies Hokkaido University (2008). He taught special courses as a visiting professor at the Hankuk University of Foreign Studies (Seoul, 2004), the Institute of Humanities at the University of Michigan, Ann Arbor (2006); Slavic Research Center of the University of Hokkaido (Sapporo, 2008–09); Visiting Professor of the Department of Political Science & Foreign Affairs, Sungshin University, Seoul (2015–16); Professor of the Department for History, Konguk University (2015–2020); Visiting Professor of CSES Kyoto University, Japan (2019).

Aside from teaching and research, Kim also presently holds the position of Vice-Chairman of the Association of Koreans in Kazakhstan, from 2000 he is a member of the NUAK (National Unification Advisory Council); of Scientific Expert Council of the Assembly of the People of Kazakhstan; of the National Council for Sciences under the President of Kazakhstan; of the Expert Council for Overseas Korean Policy by the Prime Minister of the ROK. He additionally was a historical consultant for the documentary film Koryo Saram: The Unreliable People.

For academic, educational and social efforts he was awarded the highest title of the “Honored worker of the Republic Kazakhstan” (2007); Medal “Merit for the outstanding contribution in the Development of sciences in the Republic of Kazakhstan” (2009); Golden Medal “Birlik” (Unity) for the outstanding contribution in the Friendship of the peoples of Kazakhstan (2013); 제18회 KBS 해외동포상, Korean Compatriots award of KBS for 2014 in the field of Humanities and Social sciences; Medal “20 Anniversary of Assembly of the People of Kazakhstan”, 2015; Order of Republic of Korea “Civil Merit” (국민포장. Kukmin p’hojang), 2015; Medal of the outstanding Professor of the Kazakh National al-Farabi University 2016.

== Publications ==
1. Ким Г.Н. Корея и корейцы. [Kim G.N. Korea and Koreans]. Алма-Ата, ЦК ЛКСМ, 1988, 74 с.
2. Ким Г.Н. Социально-культурное развитие корейцев Казахстана.[ Kim G.N. Socio-Cultural Development of Koreans in Kazakhstan]. Алма-Ата: Наука, 1989, 60 с.
3. Ким Г.Н. Корейцы Казахстана и Средней Азии в зарубежных исследованиях. [ Kim G.N. Koreans of Kazakhstan and Central Asia in Foreign Studies] Алма–Ата: Наука, 1990, 53 с.
4. Ким Г.Н. История, культура и язык коре сарам в советской литературе [ Kim G.N. The History, Culture and Language of Kore Saram in the Soviet Literature. (in Korean)]. // Perspeсtive, 1992, No. 12, с. 63-72. (на корейском языке).
5. Ким Г.Н. History, Culture and Language of Koryo Saram. // No., Seoul Journal of Korean Studies, 1993, рр. 125-153.
6. Ким Г.Н. и Росс Кинг. История, культура и язык коре сарам.(Историография и библиография). [ Kim G.N. and Ross King. History, Culture and Literature of Kore Saram. (Historiography and Bibliography)]. Aлматы, 1993, 182 p.
7. Ким Г.Н. Корейцы за рубежом: прошлое, настоящее и будущее. [Kim G.N. Koreans abroad: Past, Present and Future ] Алматы: Гылым, 1995, 202 с.
8. Ким Г.Н. и Мен Д.В. История и культура корейцев Казахстана. [Kim G.N. and Men D.V. History and Culture of Koreans in Kazakhstan ]. Алматы: Гылым, 1995, 346 с.
9. Ким Г.Н., Кан Г.В., Мен Д.В., Ан В. И. Корейцы Казахстана: иллюстрированная история. [ Koreans of Kazakhstan: An Illustrated History. In Russian, Korean and English ]. Сеул. STC. (на русском, корейском, английском языках). 1997.
10. Kim German. Binationale Ehen der koreanischen Bevoelkerung in der Stadt Almaty, Kasachstan. - Korea Forum. (Osnabrueck) No.1, 1999, S. 39-41.(на немецком )
11. Ким Г.Н. История иммиграции корейцев. Книга первая. Вторая половина XIX в. –1945. [Kim G.N. The History of Korean Immigration. Vol.1. Second Half of the 19th c. –1945 ] Алматы: Дайк-пресс, 1999, 424 с.
12. Ким Г.Н., Сим Енг Соб. (ред.) История корейцев Казахстана. Сборник архивных материалов. Т.2., (Kim German and Shim Young Seob. Eds. History of Koreans in Kazakhstan. Collection of Archival Materials. Vol.2, Almaty-Seoul). Алматы-Сеул, 1999, 334 с.
13. Kim German. On Inter-Ethnic Marriages among the Korean Population in the City of Almaty. - International Journal of Central Asian Studies. Institute of Asian Culture and Development, Seoul, No.5, 2000, pp. 14-27
14. Ким Г.Н. Коре сарам: историография и библиография. Алматы:Казак университетi, 2000, 324 с.
15. Ким Г.Н., Сим Енг Соб. (ред.) История корейцев Казахстана. Сборник архивных материалов. Т.3., (Kim German and Shim Young Seob. Eds. History of Koreans in Kazakhstan. Collection of Archival Materials. Vol.3, Almaty-Seoul). Алматы-Сеул, 2000, 280 с.
16. Ким Г.Н., Сим Енг Соб. История просвещения корейцев России и Казахстана. Вторая половина XIX в. – 2000. [ Kim G.N. The History of Education of Koreans in Russia and Kazakhstan. Second Half of the 19th c. – 2000 ]. Алматы: Казак университетi, 2000, 368 с.
17. Ким Г.Н., Хан В.С. Десять лет спустя. (Размышления о пройденном пути в корейском движении) [ Kim G.N., Khan V.S. 10 Years later ( Reflections on the past Way of the Korean Movement ] // Ассоциация корейцев Казахстана. Алматы: АКК, 2000, с. 185-210
18. Ким Г.Н., Хан В.С. Актуальные проблемы и перспективы корейской диаспоры Центральной Азии. - International Journal of Central Asian Studies. Institute of Asian Culture and Development, Seoul, No.5, 2000, pp. 45-61
19. Ким Г.Н. История религий Кореи. Алматы, Казак университетi, 2001, 230 с.
20. German Nikolaevich Kim and Ross King (Eds.) The Koryo Saram: Koreans in the Former USSR. Korean and Korean American Studies Bulletin. Vol. 2&3, 2001, 189 p.
21. Kim German N. The Deportation of 1937 as a Logical Continuation of Tsarist and Soviet Nationality Policy in the Russian Far East. - German Nikolaevich Kim and Ross King (Eds.) The Koryo Saram: Koreans in the Former USSR. Korean and Korean American Studies Bulletin. Vol. 2&3, 2001, pp.19-45
22. Kim German and Khan Valeriy. Ten Years Later: Thoughts and Path Traversed by the Korean Movement. - German Nikolaevich Kim and Ross King (Eds.) The Koryo Saram: Koreans in the Former USSR. East Rock Institute, New Haven, Connecticut. Korean and Korean American Studies Bulletin. Vol. 2&3, 2001, p.114-141
23. 김게르만(Kim German), 임영상(Yim Young-Sang), 김현택(Kim Hyun-Taek). 독립국가연합 지역 한국학 진흥 방안 연구. A Study on the New Strategy for the Development of Korean Studies in CIS Area//슬라브학보 제16권 2호, 2001. 12, pp. 325-362.
24. Ким Г.Н. Об истории принудительно-добровольного забвения «родного» языка постсоветскими корейцами (на примере Казахстана).- Диаспора (Москва) 2003, No. 1, с. 110-146
25. Ким Г.Н. Рассказы о родном языке. Популярное корееведение. Серия АКК. Алматы, Казак университетi, 2003. 287 с.
26. Ким Г.Н. О стандартизации процесса обучения корейскому языку в университетах Центральной Азии. – Вестник КазНУ. Серия Востоковедения. No.3 (24), 2003, с. 51-57
27. German Kim. Population and People of Kazakhstan today. – International Journal of Central Asian Studies. Seoul, 2003, Volume 8, p. 230-240
28. German Kim. Korean Diaspora in Kazakhstan: Question of Topical Problems for Minorities in Post-Soviet Space. – Newsletter of the Japanese Institute of Area Studies. Osaka, 2003, No. 89, c. 63-74
29. Kim German N. Kore Saram or Koreans of the Former Soviet Union in the Past and Present. – Amerasia Journal (США). 2003-2004, Vol. 29, Number 03, pp. 14-19
30. German Kim. Soviet Koreans in the Labor Army. Comments of the Ugay Chersik’s Presentation. – International Seminar: War and Overseas Koreans. Institute of History and Culture, HUFS, 13 May 2004, Seoul, pp. 5-23
31. 김게르만. 구소련 동포들의 남북한 통일에 대한 태도(Attitude of Post-Soviet Korean Diaspora to North and South and to the Unification of Korea. (2004 재외동포 통일문제 세미나)북한의 변화와 재외동포사회의 역할. 2004, Chejudo, pp. 151-161
32. German Kim. Migrations of Koreans in the Post soviet Space”. – The 140-year History of Koreans in Russia: Reflection and New Approach. Proceeding of International Conference in HUFS, Seoul, 27–28 August 2004, pp. 127-139
33. German Kim. Koryo Saram in Kazakhstan, Uzbekistan and Russia. – World Diasporas Encyclopedia. Immigrant and Refugee Cultures Around the World. Vol. 2. Communities (Edited by Melvin Ember, Carol R. Ember and Ian Skoggard) Kluwer Academic/Plenum Publishers. New York-Boston- Dordrecht-London-Moscow, 2004, pp. 985-993.
34. German Kim. Korean Studies in Central Asia: from Taboo to Boom. Proceedings of the 7th International Pacific Association of Korean Stidoes (PACKS), 18–21 October 2004, Chinese Culture University, Taipei, 2004, pp. 30-51
35. Ким Г.Н. Чосончжок или китайские корейцы в современной Южной Корее – Вестник КазНУ. Серия Востоковедения. 2004, No.4(29), с. 94-102
36. 김 게르만. (통일시계)중앙아시아 고려인과 조국. - 서울 : 월간한민족 제5호 (2004 02). pp. 18-28.
37. 김 게르만. 러시아 극동지방 한인 강제이주.- 서울: 韓民族共同體 제 12호 (2004), pp. 125-166;
38. 김 게르만. 소련방 붕괴 이후 러시아 고려인의 이주 현황.- 서울 : 재외동포재단; 재외한인학회, 2004.- 127-149 pp.
39. 김 게르만. 한인이민 역사. 서울, 박영사, 2005, 460 P.
40. Переводное издание- Ким Г.Н. История иммиграции корейцев. Книга первая. Вторая половина XIX в. –1945. [ Kim G.N. The History of Korean Immigration. Vol.1. Second Half of the 19th c. –1945 ] Алматы: Дайк-пресс, 1999, 424 с.
41. 김게르만. 러시아 지역의 한인 이주와 민족운동)한인의 러시아 극동지역 이주와 정착. 서울 : 한국민족운동사학회, 42호 (2005. 03), pp. 137-161;
42. Ким Г.Н. История иммиграции корейцев. 1945-2000. Книга вторая. Часть 1. Алматы. Дайк-пресс. Казахстанские востоковедные исследования. 2006, 428 с.
43. Ким Г.Н. История иммиграции корейцев. 1945-2000. Книга вторая. Часть 2. Алматы. Дайк-пресс. Казахстанские востоковедные исследования. 2006, 394 с.
44. German Kim. Life as Koryo Saram // Kyoto Journal (Japan), No 67, 2007, pp.69-70
45. Socio-Demographic parameters of Koreans in the sovereign Kazakhstan // Корейцы в России, радикальная трансформация и пути дальнейшего развития, Москва, 2007, с. 8-42
46. Diasupora toshite no Korian (Koreans as Diaspora). В соавторстве с E.Chang (USA), S. Ryang (USA), Lee Kwang-Kyu (ROK), R.King (Canada). East Rock Institute. Tokyo. 2007, 578 pages.
47. Ким Г.Н. Корейские книжные фонды в Казахстане // Известия корееведения в Центральной Азии. Алматы, 2008, No. 15, с. 116-144
48. What is in our names? - “Inmunhakwa nonchon” (Журнал гуманитарных наук). Институт гуманитарных наук, Университет Конгук, 2008, No. 12, с. 153-175
49. Из истории корейских поселенческих структур в советском Казахстане. Отан Тарихы. 2008, No. 4, с. 102-123
50. German N. Kim (Area Editor) Korean Diaspora: Central Asia, Northeast Asia and North America. East Rock Institute. New Haven, Connecticut, 2008.
51. Ethnic Entrepreneurship of Koreans in the USSR and post Soviet Central Asia. IDE VRS Monograph Series, No.446, Institute of Developing Economies, 2008, 99 pages.
52. Education and Diasporic Language: The Case of Koreans in Kazakhstan. - Acta slavonica. Hokkaido University, 2009, Vol. XXXVII (2009), pp. 103–125
53. Современная южнокорейская проза как историко-страноведческий источник// Вестник КазНУ. Серия Востоковедения. 2009, No. 2(47), с. 105-111.
54. Корейская диаспора в стратегическом партнерстве Казахстана и Южной Кореи. – Известия корееведения в Центральной Азии. Алматы, 2010, No. 9 (17), с. 30-42.
55. Эволюция национального и этнического самосознания коре сарам. - Международные исследования. Общество. Политика. Экономика. Астана: Институт Социально-политических исследований. №2, 2010, с. 22-30
56. Диаспорология России и Казахстана в контексте мирового развития научной отрасли // Acta Rossiana: Institute of Russian and CIS Studies, University of Koryo. 2010, №2, с. 156-178
57. German Kim and Ross King. The Northern Region of Korea as Portrayed in Russian Sources,1860s–1913. In : The Northern Region, Identity, and Culture in Korea. Sun Joo Kim, Editor: Сenter For Korea Studies Publication University оf Washington Press: Seattle & London, 2010, pp. 254-295
58. Korean Books in Kazakhstan.- Korean Language Diaspora. Edited by Clair Yu and Ha Young Ha. University of Berkeley: Center for Korean Studies: 2010, pp. 98-136.
59. Республика Корея. Страны Мира. [Republic of Korean. Serial: The Countries of the World], Almaty: Daik-Press, 2010.- 584 p.
60. 김 게르만. 한인이민 역사. (История иммиграции корейцев. 1945-2000).
61. 서울: 한국학술정보, 2010. - 604 P. Этничность, самосознание и религиозность корейцев Центральной Азии.- Analytic, 2010, № 5, c.29-35.
62. Южнокорейская модель политической модернизации. - Analytic, 2011, No. 2, с. 121-133.
63. Стратегическое партнерство в современных международных отношениях. - Analytic, 2011, No. 4, с.40-53
64. Korean Books in Kazakhstan. – Иминчхоги кёюгви пальчжачхви. (Просвещение в начальный период иммиграции корейцев). Под редакцией Кан Янг Вон и Клэр Ю. Университет Южной Калифорнии Беркли. | Сеул: Сэнин, 2011, с. 221-264.
65. Ким Г.Н. Корейская литература. - Новейшая зарубежная литература Коллективная монография. Алматы: Жибек жылы, 2011. – с. 172-202
66. Религии Кореи. Учебник на казахском языке. В соавторстве с Ташкинбаевой Бахытгуль. [ Religion in Korea. In co-authorship with Bahytgul Tashkinbayeva. In Kazakh)] Analysis of Diplomatic Relations between the Republic of Korea and the Republic of Kazakhstan and its Prospect. В соавторстве с Cho Eun-Jeong. - Асta Russiana ( Koryo University, Korea), 2012, No. 4, с. 97-123.
67. 민족, 종족, 디아스포라의 자아의식.(Национальное, этническое и диаспорное самосознание). Journal of Siberian Studies. Pai Chai University, Korea, 2012, Vol. XVI -1, pp. 81-105
68. Корейские военнопленные в ГУЛАГе: правда или вымысел? [Korean POWs in GULAG: truth or Myth?] - Analytic, 2012, N.4, pp. 94–108
69. Казахстан — Южная Корея: по пути стратегического партнерства: монография. — В двух книгах. Книга 1. Этапы партнерства и сотрудничества. — Алматы: [Kazakhstan and South Korea on the way of strategic Partnership. Vol.1. Monograph] Казахстанский институт стратегических исследований при Президенте РК, 2012. — 392 c.
70. Казахстан — Южная Корея: по пути стратегического партнерства: монография. — В двух книгах. Книга 2. Сборник документов.[Kazakhstan and South Korea on the way of strategic Partnership. Vol. 2. Collection of Documents] — Алматы: Казахстанский институт стратегических исследований при Президенте РК, 2012. — 432 c.
71. The contribution of ethnic Koreans to the promotion of the bilateral cultural relations between Kazakhstan and Korea.- Central Asia’s Affairs. 2012, No. 3, p. 41-46.
72. Сотрудничество Казахстана и Южной Кореи в сфере культуры, образования и науки.- Известия корееведения в Центральной Азии. Алматы, 2012, No. 19, с.150-211.
73. Диаспоральное самосознание и диаспорный язык [Diasporal self-consciousness and diasporal language]. – Известия КазГУМО и МЯ им. Абылай хана. Серия «Востоко-ведение» [The newsletter of the Kazakh State University of International relations and World Languages named after Ablai-khan. The Eastern Studies series], 2013, No. 1-2, с. 92-103
74. Связанные одной судьбой. К 90-летию газеты «Коре ильбо», Алматы 200 с [Sharing one destiny. To the 90th anniversary of the “Koryo ilbo” newspaper, Almaty, 2013, 200 p.].
75. Избранные труды по корееведению. [Selected works in Korean Studies] Al-maty: Kazak University, 2013, 755 c.
76. «Нанын коресарамида.» Сеул, издательство Кукхаквон [나는 고려 사람이다 Seoul, Gukhakwon Press], 2013, - 422 c.
77. The contribution of ethnic Koreans in promoting bilateral cultural relations between Kazakhstan and Korea. – Central Asia’s Affairs, 3/ 2012, pp. 16–30
78. Православие и корейцы. Автор-составитель. Москва: Издательская группа ООК, 2014, 496 с. Коре сарам. К 150-летию переселения корейцев в Россию. М.: Мedia Land, 2014.- 539 с.
79. Объединение Кореи неизбежно. Сеул: «웃고 문화사» (UKGO), 2014 - 212 с.
80. Корейский театр в Казахстане: зарождение, развитие и перспективы.- Национальные театры Казахстана. Монография Института литературы и искусства. МО, 2014, c.
81. Die Koreaner vom Russischen Reich bis zum Zentral Asien.- журнал POGROM, 2014, Развал СССР и дивергентные процессы среди корейцев СНГ. - Журнал «Известия корееведения в Центральной Азии, No. 21, 2014, с. 11-32.
82. Irredentism in disputed territories and its influence in the border con-flicts and wars. – JTMS. The Journal of Territorial and Maritime Studies. Vol. 3, Number 1, Winter/Spring 2016.- pp. 87-103.
83. Введение в диаспорологию. Учебное пособие. [Introduction in the Di-aspora Studies] Издательство “Kazak универсетi”, 2016.- 231 с.
84. Correlations of Ethnicity, Identity and Religiosity of the young Generation of Korean Diaspora.(Preliminaries of the survey among Korean Minority Students in the post-soviet Central Asia) - International Journal of Global Diaspora Studies CIS 고려인 문학사와 론 CIS 고려인 문화의 어제와 오늘.
85. 정덕준, 김영미, 김정훈, 이상갑, 최인나, 김남석, 김게르만 지음 | 한국문화사.| 2016. 417 pages. (Ким Г.Н. в соавторстве с Чунг Док Чун, Ким Ен Ми, Ли Сан Габ, Инна Цой, Ким Нам Сок. История развития литература корейцев СНГ). Сеул: Хангук мунхваса. 417 стр.
86. Ким Г.Н. и Чен В.С. Авторы-составители. Православие и корейцы. Численная и территориальная мобильность корейской диаспоры Казах-стана. - Известия корееведения Центральной Азии. [“Korean Section of the Kazakhstan Union of Writers].”- Newsletters of Korean Studies in Central Asia. 2016, No. 23-24, p. 55-79
87. Ким Г.Н. Корейская секция писателей Казахстана.- Известия корееведения Цен-тральной Азии. [“Korean Section of the Kazakhstan Union of Writers].”- Newsletters of Korean Studies in Central Asia. 2016, No. 23-24, p. 278-297
88. German N. KIM and Young Jin KIM. Gobonji as a Phenomenon of Ethnic Entrepre-neurship among the Koryo-saram in the Soviet Second Economy. Korea Journal, vol. 56, no. 4 (winter 2016): 92-119.2017
89. Migration vs. Repatriation to South Korea in the Past and Present. - Journal of Contem-porary Korean Studies Vol. 4, No. 1 (March 2017): 35-62
90. Объединение Кореи неизбежно. Книга 2. Cеул: Издательство UKGO, 2017. 212 с.
91. Автор составитель совместно с В. Пак и В. Чен. Корейцы и православие. Сборник статей. Владивосток: Издательство Валентин, 2017. 512 с.
92. Корейцы независимого Казахстана. (Koreans of the independent Kazakhstan) in Russian and Kazakh. Астана, Академия гос. управления РК, Astana, Academy of state administration under the President of Kazakhstan. 2016, 210 pages
93. Синханчхон – прототип «кориатауна» в России. Sinhanchon as prototype of Koria town. 슬라브연구 33권4호, 2017년 12월, 페이지: 65-102 (KCI)
94. Энциклопедия корейцев Казахстана. (Encyclopedia of Koreans in Kazakhstan (Co-Editor, Chief Consultant) Алматы:Kahak, 2017, 767 с.
95. The perishing language of Diaspora: the case of Koryo mar in Kazakhstan. –The Korean Language spread in Diaspora – Focusing on the Language Education. Edited by Claire You and Jangwon Ha. Monograph of the Center for Korean Diaspora. USLA Berkeley. 2018, pp. 122–232.
96. Ким Г.Н. (ред. и соавтор). Диаспоры Казахстана: единство в многообразии. Алматы: Казак университетi, 2018. (Edit and Co-author). Diaspora in Kazakhstan: Un-um in pluribus. Almaty, 2018
97. 아리랑: 카자흐스탄 고려인 디아스포라의 민족 정체성적 상징. - 가요 속 통일인문학. 건국대학교 통일인문학연구단.| 2018, 177-195
98. German N. Kim, Hwang Youngsarm. Korean Theater in Kazakhstan as a Cultural Hub of Diaspora. Submitted to Korea Journal (SSCI, Scopus, Thomson&Reuter )
99. Международный опыт диаспор Казахстана (ed) [Diasporas of Kazakhstan in international relations] Алматы: Kazakh Universiteti 2019, 280 c.
