= PA Consulting Group =

British professional services company

- Formerly: Personnel Administration
- Type: Private
- Founded: 1943; 83 years ago
- Founders: Ernest E. Butten; Tom H. Kirkham; Dr David Seymour
- Headquarters: London, UK
- Number of locations: 19
- Key people: Jiten Kachhela, President
- Revenue: £752.9m (2024)
- Owner: Jacobs Solutions
- Number of employees: 3,895 (2024)
- Website: www.paconsulting.com

PA Consulting Group (formerly Personnel Administration) is a global professional services firm based in London, England, that works with public, private and third-sector organisations. It was founded in 1943 by Ernest E. Butten, Tom H. Kirkham and Dr David Seymour, who used a new approach to people management to increase productivity in munitions factories during World War 2. In 1970, the company was the world’s largest management consultancy by headcount.

The company is privately held by Dallas-based engineering company Jacobs Solutions.

== History ==
=== 1940–1950 ===
PA was founded in 1943 as Personnel Administration by Ernest E. Butten, Tom H. Kirkham and Dr David Seymour. Britain's war effort created great demand for munitions and goods, which had to be produced by a relatively unskilled workforce. Butten and his colleagues formed Personnel Administration Limited to provide advice to industry as to how to improve the productivity of their workers. PA was an offshoot of the pre-war Bedaux Company. Bedaux in turn had been developed based on the 'scientific management' theories of Frederick Winslow Taylor and Frank Gilbreth. Butten sought to take the mechanistic and task-orientated concepts of scientific management and add a human dimension to them. The chief idea, along the lines of Douglas McGregor's 'Theory Y', was that by involving the worker in the process of change and a suitable form of ownership, greater gains could be made both by the worker and the organisation.

PA's first assignment was to train volunteer women to assemble the tail gun section of Avro Lancaster bombers, as part of Britain's policy of bringing women into the factories to free up male workers for the armed forces.

=== 1950–1970 ===
By 1964, PA had dropped the name Personnel Administration and was known as simply PA Consulting Group. PA expanded and, by 1970, was the world’s largest management consulting firm by headcount. PA had also expanded geographically, mostly along the lines of the Commonwealth, with its operations in Australia providing about a third of the firm's revenue.

Butten retired from PA in 1970, having earlier sold his 100% shareholding in PA to the Butten Trust in 1958. The Trust was intended as a long-term guardian of PA's fortunes and an assurance that the company would be 'owned by the employees'.

=== 1970–1992 ===
During this period, PA found success in advising companies on potential applications of technology to business issues. This led to the building of technology centres in Melbourn, UK, and Princeton, USA.

Towards the end of the '80s, PA's management took the firm public. However, the company changed its strategy after 1992 to one of staff ownership.

=== 1992–2015 ===
Between 1991 and 1994, PA reduced its workforce by almost half. In 1992, Jon Moynihan was appointed as chief executive of PA.

Jeremy Asher became group CEO in 1998. The firm acquired Hagler Bailly Inc. in 2000 for around $96 million in cash.

Government figures released in 2010 showed that PA was the second largest beneficiary of UK Government contracts to consulting firms, receiving £11 million over the first year of the coalition. It has gained publicity for its work on analysing what it has called the zombie economy. Other work includes its annual survey of opinion in higher education, and ongoing technological innovations, including a new type of round kitchen towel.

On 31 December 2013, Jon Moynihan retired as executive chairman, and was replaced by Marcus Agius, the former chairman of Barclays Bank. In March 2014 the company launched a new logo (the third in its history), a new visual identity and redesigned website. Also in March 2014, Health Select Committee member Sarah Wollaston MP questioned PA Consulting's uploading of a pseudonymised extract of Hospital Episode Statistics to Google BigQuery. The Health and Social Care Information Centre confirmed that PA had used the data in accordance with the information sharing agreement in place.

=== 2015–present ===
In 2015, The Carlyle Group bought a majority stake in the company, giving it a value of US$1 billion.

In October 2017, PA relocated its global corporate headquarters to London Victoria District.

In April 2018, PA's chairman, Marcus Agius, announced he would step down and assume the role of deputy chairman, with John Alexander replacing him. Alexander made the move from environmental and sustainability consultancy ERM, where he took the company through two rounds of private equity funding. In December 2018, PA announced it was appointing a new head of its Americas business, Ken Toombs. The group announced Ken Toombs as CEO in October 2020, following on from Alan Middleton who stepped down after 13 years as CEO of the consultancy.

In November 2020, PA’s board announced its recommendation to accept a proposal by Jacobs Solutions to acquire a 65% stake in PA, with the Carlyle Group exiting from their ownership. Following a vote by PA shareholders and UK Court approval, the deal was finalised on 2 March 2021, valuing PA at £1.825 billion.

In 2023, Christian Norris was named as CEO.

In March 2026, majority owner Jacobs Solutions acquired all outstanding employee shares for the firm.

In June 2026, the company issued a press release announcing the appointment of Jiten Kachhela as its new president, and that CEO Christian Norris was leaving the company.

== Controversy ==
In 2008, PA Consulting staff lost a memory stick containing thousands of prisoners' details, leading the Home Office to terminate the relevant contract and place their other contracts under review.

In 2014, UK Trade & Investment, a UK government body, entered into a three-year contract with PA Consulting for the provision of trade and investment specialists. An audit found PA “consistently made incorrect and misleading representations” and the head of the National Audit Office said, “both UKTI and PA have fallen well below the standards expected in managing public money”. A subsequent House of Commons Public Accounts Committee report concluded, "We are not convinced that PA accepts the seriousness of its misrepresentations to UKTI or its failure to honour its duty of care to UKTI and the taxpayer."

In 2022, the Post Office Horizon IT Inquiry questioned a former director of PA Consulting about the firm's advisory role in the decision to proceed with the project in 1999 despite known faults.

In 2023, PA Consulting threatened legal action against the news publication Schools Week to prevent disclosure of the day rates paid to PA Consulting staff on a government contract to test proposed reforms of Special Needs provision in schools.

In 2025, PA was awarded a £200,000 contract by the University of Edinburgh to cut costs in the College of Arts, Humanities and Social Sciences. On their recommendation, 90 degree programmes were closed in 2026 despite academic staff and their trade union protesting at the academic consequences and lost fee income at negligible marginal cost.

== Operations ==
The company is headquartered in London, England. It lists additional offices in the United Kingdom, USA, Ireland, the Netherlands, Norway and Sweden. The company's 2024 annual report reported £752.9m in revenue, and 3,895 employees. The company is owned by Jacobs Solutions.

PA works with organisations in seven industries: consumer and manufacturing; defence and security; energy and utilities; financial services; public services; healthcare and life sciences; and transport. The company's clients include major pharmaceutical companies such as Diageo, Procter & Gamble, and Unilever, major airports including Dallas Fort Worth International Airport, and energy companies including England's Nuclear Decommissioning Authority, at its Sellafield nuclear site.

It is also a member of the United Nations Global Compact, a non-binding UN pact that encourages businesses to adopt sustainable practices, and the WePROTECT Global Alliance, a network of governments and companies aiming to tackle online child exploitation and abuse. PA produced the first two Global Threat Assessments for WePROTECT.

== Technology and innovation ==
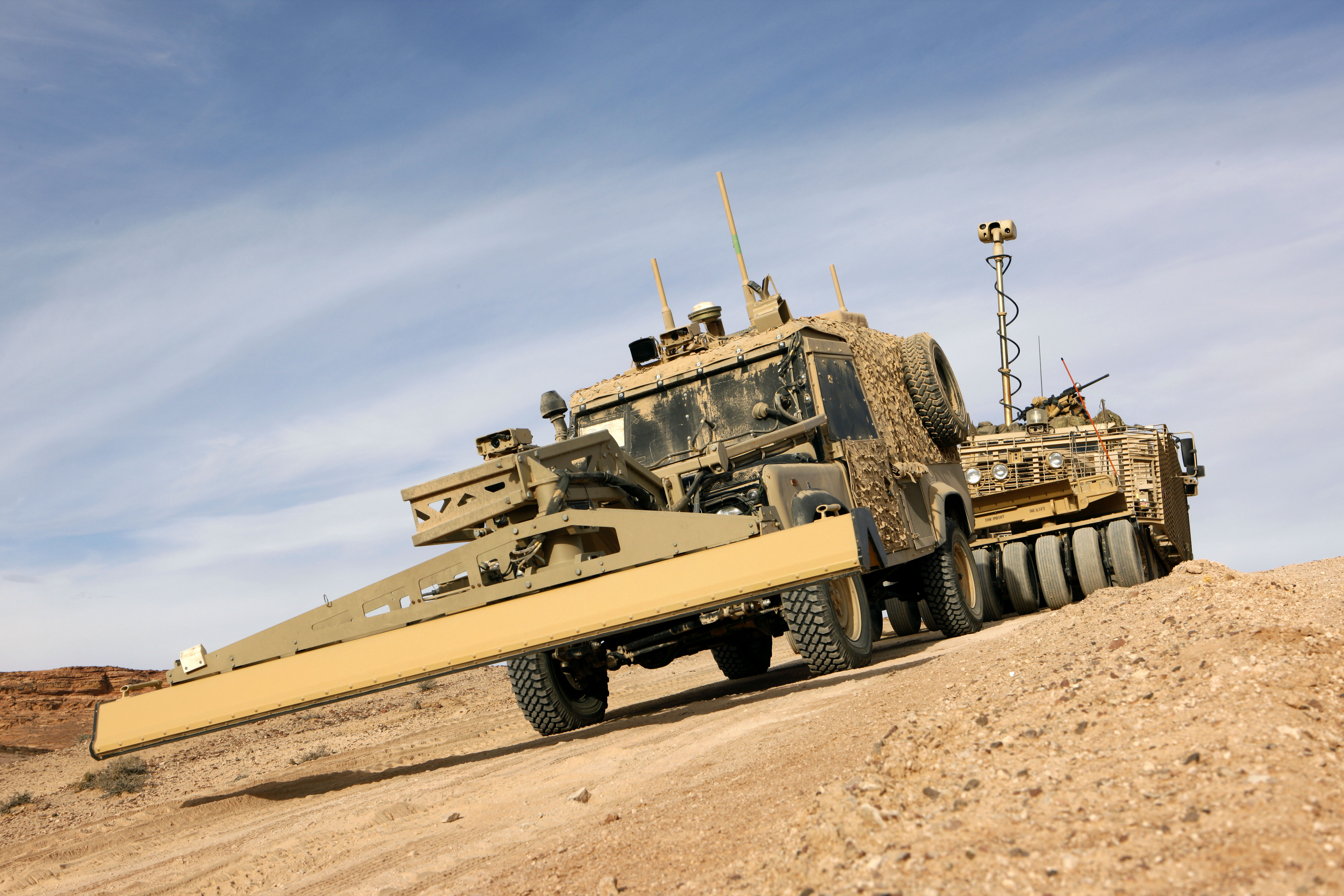
Remote-control "Panama" Land Rover with ground-penetrating radar to detect IEDs followed by Mastiff with Choker mine rollers

PA has a strong focus on technology dating back to its work with the earliest computers in the 1950s. Its Global Innovation and Technology Centre, designed by Richard Rogers and founded by Professor Gordon Edge in 1970, helped create the Cambridge Phenomenon where the city became a centre for the UK’s technological companies.

Innovations developed at the centre over the past 50 years include: the original brushless servo motor; medical injectors that mean the patient does not need to see the needle; a self-monitoring device for people with diabetes that measures blood glucose levels; micrometers; and 4G wireless test equipment. During the Iraq War, PA developed the "Panama System" to protect UK troops from improvised explosive devices, winning the Management Consultancies Association's top prize for innovation.

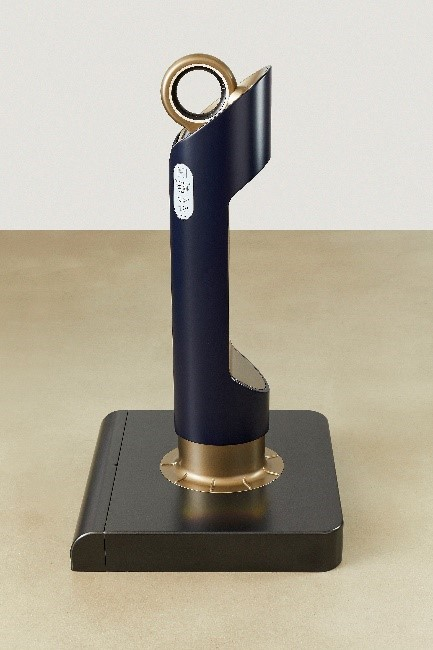
EV chargepoint concept designed by PA Consulting with the Royal College of Art for the UK Government

More recently, the Centre designed a prototype electric vehicle charging point that aims to be “as recognisable as the red post box or black cab” with the Royal College of Art for the UK Government; developed the manufacturing equipment needed to mass produce edible water bottles for Notpla; and helped build the world’s biggest battery in California with Vistra Energy.

=== PA ventures ===
PA's venture programme (PA Group Ventures) was established in 2000.

Ventures include a third-generation mobile phone business called UbiNetics that was sold for a total of $133 million in 2005; and Meridica – a drug delivery system company – that was sold to Pfizer for $125 million in 2004. PA demerged its venture arm, Ipex Capital, in June 2008.

Other recent ventures include:

- Exacsys, which develops solutions to improve Point of Care (PoC) diagnostic systems. One application of this technology is the self-monitoring of blood glucose (SMBG) to help people manage their diabetes.
- ProcServe, which provides a cloud-based procurement system. The ProcServe Trading Network covers more than 17,000 organisations and is used by central government, and the National Police Procurement Hub, as well as commercial sector customers including Orange and Xerox.
- Argenti, a business that innovates telecare technology in partnership with local councils in the UK to improve adult social care.
