= Meredith Jung-En Woo =

Korean American academic (born 1958)

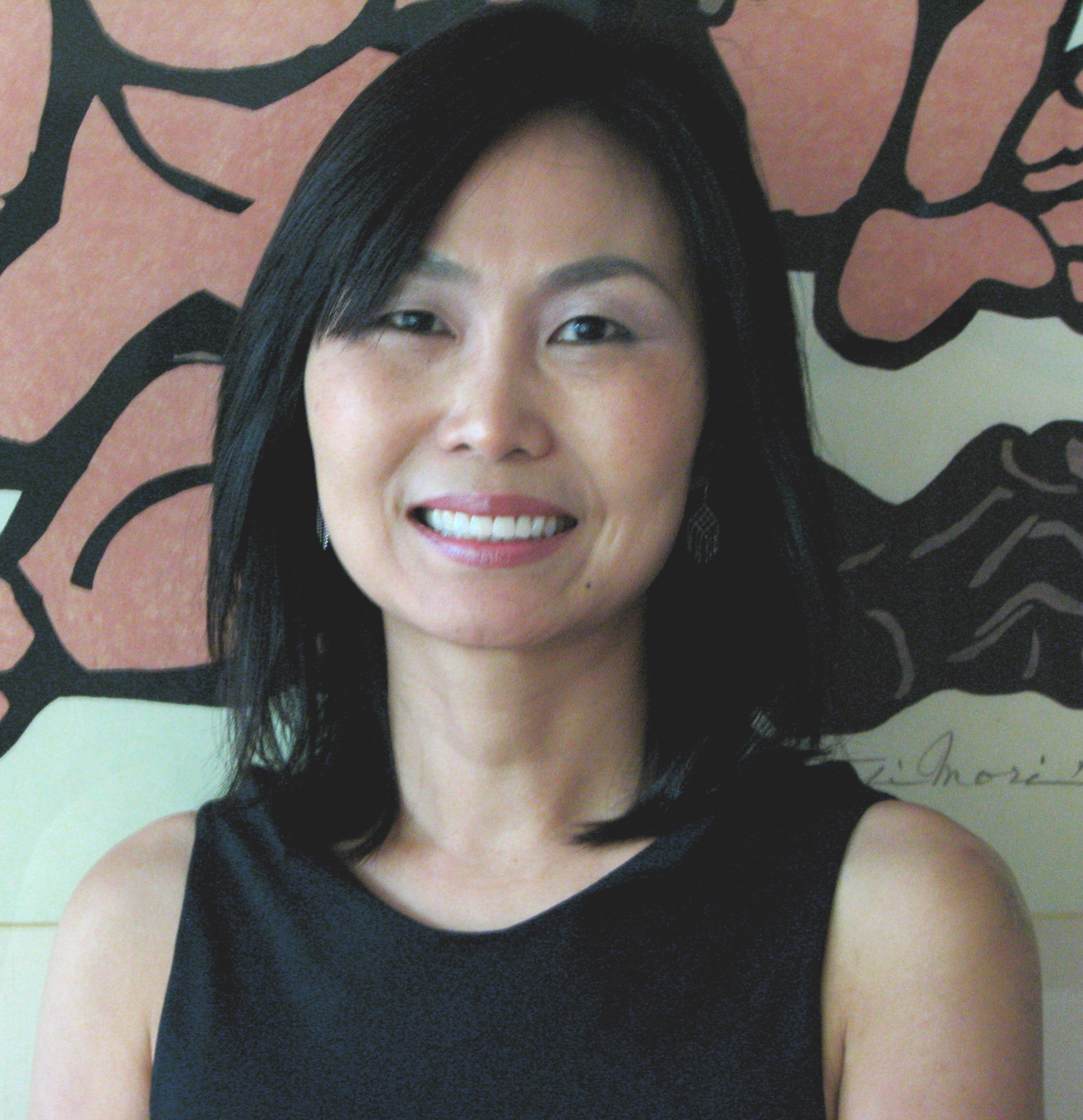
- Born: 1958 (age 66–67); Seoul, South Korea
- Occupation(s): School of Politics and Global Studies faculty member at Arizona State University

Korean name
- Hangul: 우정은
- RR: U Jeongeun
- MR: U Chŏngŭn

Meredith Jung-En Woo is an American academic and author. She is a Senior Fellow at the University Design Institute and a Professor of Practice at the School of Politics and Global Studies, both at Arizona State University. She served as President of Sweet Briar College and as the Dean of the College and Graduate School of Arts and Sciences at the University of Virginia. She is the former director of the International Higher Education Support Program at the Open Society Foundations in London.

== Personal life ==
Woo was born and raised in Seoul, South Korea, and attended an international high school in Tokyo, Japan. Her father, Yong-Hai Woo, was a noted economic planner and diplomat who led the reparation mission for South Korea in Japan. She graduated magna cum laude from Bowdoin College, majoring in history. She has earned an M.A. in international affairs and Latin American studies, and a Ph.D. in political science, from Columbia University.

== Career ==
Woo serves on the board of the American Hospital of Paris Foundation. She is a trustee of the Asian University for Women in Chittagong, Bangladesh; and in her capacity as the Director of International Higher Education Program, served ex officio on the board of the Central European University in Budapest, Hungary, and the Governing Board of the European Humanities University, Vilnius, Lithuania. Woo was appointed by President Bill Clinton to serve on the Presidential Commission on U.S.-Pacific Trade and Investment Policy. She has consulted for the World Bank, the United States Trade Representative, Social Science Research Council, Asian Development Bank Institute, United Nations Research Institute for Social Development, the Asia Foundation, and the MacArthur Foundation. She is on the editorial board of the Journal of East Asian Politics, Studies in Comparative International Development, as well as the Contemporary Politics Series on Comparative Political Economy, published in Beijing.

Woo taught at Columbia University and Northwestern University as assistant and associate professor. She then became Professor of Political Science at the University of Michigan. Her teaching and research interests include international political economy, economic development, East Asian politics, and U.S.-East Asian relations. She became Associate Dean for the Social Sciences of the College of Literature, Science, and the Arts University of Michigan College of Literature at the university. In 2008 she was appointed as the Buckner W. Clay Dean of the College and Graduate School at the University of Virginia. During her term as dean, she restructured the graduate programs, reallocating resources across 25 PhD granting programs based on performance, and significantly improving the amount and number of fellowships, and providing for the first time multi-year guarantees. In the six-year period she raised a total of $260 million for the School, and oversaw completion of five new construction projects. In 2015 she took leave of absence from the University of Virginia to direct the International Higher Education Program for the Open Society Foundations, which was responsible for creation and support of over fifty liberal arts colleges in the former Soviet bloc countries. She refocused the effort to supporting higher education for refugee populations, particularly Syrians in Turkey, Lebanon and Jordan, as well as the Rohingya population, dispersed in Burma, Bangladesh, and elsewhere.

Sweet Briar College announced that Woo would become the 13th president of the college; and was instated on May 15, 2017, replacing president Phillip C. Stone. During her presidency the college underwent a comprehensive restructuring, consisting of an academic reset that replaced general education with a core curriculum on women leadership; tuition reset which brought down the published tuition from $36,000 to $21,000; and a curricular realignment that brought the number of majors from 42 to 16. In the fall 2018 following the restructuring, first year enrollment went up 42 percent.

== Works ==
She has authored and edited seven books, several published mostly under the name Meredith Woo-Cumings. They include Race to the Swift: State and Finance in Korean Industrialization (Columbia University Press, 1991), which was published under the name Jung-en Woo; Past as Prelude: History in the Making of the New World Order (Westview Press, 1991); Capital Ungoverned: Liberalizing Finance in Interventionist States (Cornell University Press, 1996), The Developmental State (Cornell University Press, 1999), as well as the co-authored report of the Presidential Report, "Building American Prosperity in the 21st Century: Report of the Presidential Commission on United States-Pacific Trade and Investment Policy" (Government Printing Office, 1997). Her book Neoliberalism and Reform in East Asia (2007) was the result of a project sponsored by the United Nations Research Institute for Social Development and the Rockefeller Foundation. She also published a book of essays under the title, Something New Under the Sun: Education at Mr. Jefferson's University.

She was executive producer of Koryo Saram: The Unreliable People, a film about Stalin's ethnic cleansing of Koreans during the Great Terror. It premiered at the Smithsonian Institution, Washington DC, and won the Best Documentary Award from the National Film Board of Canada in 2008.

- Woo, Meredith (1991). Race to the Swift: State and Finance in Korean Industrialization. Columbia University Press.
- Woo, Meredith (1991). Past as Prelude: History in the Making of the New World Order. Westview Press.
- Woo, Meredith (1996). Capital Ungoverned: Liberalizing Finance in Interventionist States. Cornell University Press.
- Woo, Meredith (1999). The Developmental State. Cornell University Press.
- Woo, Meredith (2007). Neoliberalism and Institutional Reform in East Asia. Palgrave.
- Woo, Meredith (2014). Something New Under the Sun. University of Virginia Press.
- Woo, Meredith; Cumings, Bruce (2006). "What Does North Korea Want?". New York Times.
