= Ferdinand Feldbrugge =

Dutch legal historian

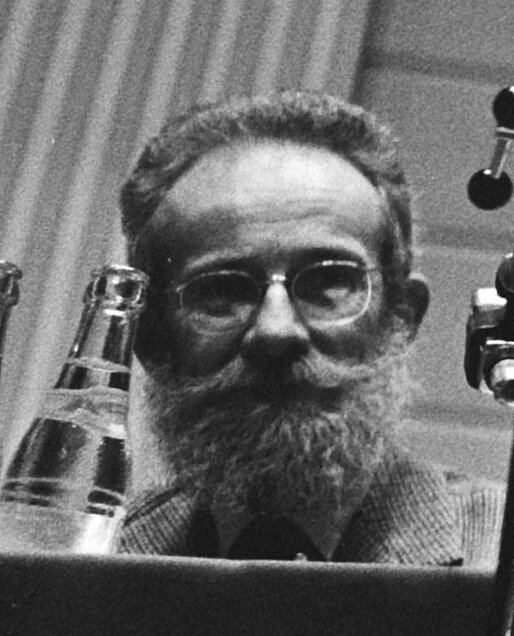
- Feldbrugge in 1985
- Born: 1933 (age 92–93); The Hague, Netherlands

Academic background
- Education: Utrecht University
- Thesis: Schuld in het Sovjetstrafrecht [Guilt in Soviet Criminal law] (1959)

Ferdinand Joseph Maria Feldbrugge (born 1933) is a Dutch scholar that studies legal history of Russia. He is an emeritus professor at Leiden University.

== Biography ==
Feldbrugge was born in 1933 in The Hague, the Netherlands. He received an LL.M. from Utrecht University in 1955 and defended his thesis there becoming a Doctor of Law in 1959. Feldbrugge also performed counterintelligence work for the Royal Netherlands Army.

In 1967, he became a Professor of Law at Leiden University and in 1972 headed the Institute of East European Law and Russian Studies there until 1998. Feldbrugge served as a "Sovietologist in Residence" for the NATO chief from 1987 to 1989 and as President of the International Council for Central and East European Studies from 1995 to 2000.

Feldbrugge visited the Soviet Union in 1973.

== Books ==
=== Author ===
- Schuld in het Sowjet strafrecht [Guilt in Soviet criminal law] (in Dutch). Dekker & Van de Vegt. 1959. OCLC 16813948.
- Soviet criminal law; general part. A.W. Sijthoff. 1964. OCLC 676942.
- Samizdat and Political Dissent in the Soviet Union. Brill Publishers. 2024 [1975]. ISBN 9789004642522.
- Russian law : the end of the Soviet system and the role of law. M. Nijhoff Publishers. 1993. ISBN 9780792323587.
- Law in Medieval Russia. M. Nijhoff Publishers. 2009. ISBN 9789004180857.
- A history of Russian law : from ancient times to the Council Code (Ulozhenie) of Tsar Aleksei Mikhailovich of 1649. Brill Nijhoff. 2018. ISBN 9789004346420.
- A history of Russian law : from the Council Code (Ulozhenie) of Tsar Aleksei Mikhailovich of 1649 to the Bolshevik Revolution of 1917. Brill Nijhoff. 2023. ISBN 9789004523043.

=== Editor ===
- Encyclopedia of Soviet law. Martinus Nijhoff Publishers. 1985 [1973]. ISBN 9789024730759.
- Codification in the communist world : symposium in memory of Zsolt Szirmai (1903-1973). A.W. Sijthoff. 1975. ISBN 9789028601253.
- The Constitutions of the USSR and the union republics : analysis, texts, reports. Sijthoff & Noordhoff. 1979. ISBN 9789028604896.
- Perspectives on Soviet Law for The 1980's. Brill. 2024 [1982]. ISBN 9789004635524.
- Ruling Communist parties and their status under law. Martinus Nijhoff Publishers. 1986. OCLC 1097505161.
- The Distinctiveness of Soviet law. Martinus Nijhoff. 1988. ISBN 9789024735761.
- The Emancipation of Soviet law. Martinus Nijhoff Publishers. 1992. ISBN 9780792314363.
- Russian Federation legislative survey : June 1990-December 1993. M. Nijhoff. 1995. ISBN 9789004632936.
- International and national law in Russia and Eastern Europe : essays in honor of George Ginsburgs. M. Nijhoff Publishers. 2001. ISBN 9789041116543.
- Law in Transition. M. Nijhoff. 2002. ISBN 9789041119667.
- Human Rights in Russia and Eastern Europe Essays in Honor of Ger P. Van Den Berg. M. Nijhoff. 2021. ISBN 9789041119513.
- Public Policy and Law in Russia In Search of a Unified Legal and Political Space ; Essays in Honor of Donald D. Barry. M. Nijhoff. 2005. ISBN 9789004149168.
- Russia, Europe, and the rule of law. Martinus Nijhoff. 2007. ISBN 9789047411642.

== Awards ==
- Order of the Netherlands Lion (the Netherlands, 2003)
- Badge "For Cooperation" (Russia, 2019)
