= J. Otto Pohl =

American historian (born 1970)

- Born: Jonathan Otto Pohl; 1970 (age 55–56)
- Citizenship: United States
- Occupation: Historian

Academic background
- Education: School of Oriental and African Studies, University of London (PhD)

Academic work
- Main interests: Ethnic cleansing in the USSR
- Notable works: The Stalinist Penal System, Ethnic Cleansing in the USSR, 1937-1949

Jonathan Otto Pohl (born 1970) is an American historian who formerly worked for the American University of Iraq, Sulaimani, the University of Ghana, and American University of Central Asia. He has a PhD in history from the School of Oriental and African Studies, University of London. Pohl's works are primarily focused on ethnic cleansing in the Soviet Union; he has written several books on the subject, including The Stalinist Penal System (1997), Ethnic Cleansing in the USSR, 1937-1949 (1999), and The Years of Great Silence (2022).

== Education and career ==
Pohl is American, and was born in 1970. Pohl received a BA in history from Grinnell College. He received a master's degree in history from the School of Oriental and African Studies, University of London, and went on to receive a PhD from the same institution.

From 2007 to 2010 he was an associate professor at the American University of Central Asia in Kyrgyzstan, teaching international and comparative politics. In 2011, Pohl became a visiting scholar at the University of Ghana in the history department, and was a lecturer at the same institution from 2012 to 2016. He was an assistant professor of social sciences at the American University of Iraq, Sulaimani from 2016 to 2019.

== Works ==
Pohl has written four books; his works are primarily focused on ethnic cleansing in the Soviet Union. His first book, The Stalinist Penal System: A Statistical History of Soviet Repression and Terror 1930-1953, was published in 1997 by McFarland. The book is based on quantitative data and statistics rather than testimonies. Michael Gelb called the book useful, particularly for making accessible much scholarship previously unavailable in English, but criticized its editing; Christopher Ward, writing in the Journal of European Studies, said it was "a statistical handbook rather than a history, and is best approached in that manner."

His second book, Ethnic Cleansing in the USSR, 1937-1949, was published by Greenwood Press in 1999. Pohl criticizes statements from other scholars, particularly Charles Maier and Deborah Lipstadt, both of whom argued that Soviet citizens were not victims of forced deportations based on their ethnicity. He argues that this is "willful ignorance" of the systematic deportations of many Soviet citizens of varying ethnicities, which he contends constituted ethnic cleansing. The book surveys the peoples who were forcefully deported by the Soviets. Scholar Brian Glyn Williams described the book as "groundbreaking" and said that Pohl "makes a strong case" for describing it as ethnic cleansing. John Klier said the book "achieves the valuable task of chronicling the fate of the deported peoples", but criticized it for painting the different deported peoples as overly similar.

In 2009, his Catherine's Grandchildren: A Short History of the Russian-Germans under Soviet Rule was published by the American Historical Society of Germans from Russia. The Years of Great Silence: The Deportation, Special Settlement, and Mobilization into the Labor Army of Ethnic Germans in the USSR, 1941–1955, was published in 2022 by Ibidem Press. A review of The Years of Great Silence in Slavic Review, describing Pohl as a "an established chronicler of repression and ethic cleansing in the Soviet Union", praised the book as a "detailed and highly informative account" with "extensive factual information", though criticized the tone as overly opinionated.

Pohl contributed a chapter to the 2008 edited volume Migration, Homeland, and Belonging in Eurasia, about Soviet deportations. He also contributed a chapter to the 2016 book Kwame Nkrumah, 1909-1972: A Controversial Visionary by Bea Lundt and Christopher Marx, about Ghanaian president Kwame Nkrumah. His chapter focuses on the coup against Nkrumah, and the CIA's role.

== Publications ==
=== Books ===
- —— (1997). The Stalinist Penal System: A Statistical History of Soviet Repression and Terror, 1930-1953. McFarland & Company. ISBN 978-0-7864-0336-3.
- —— (1999). Ethnic Cleansing in the USSR, 1937-1949. Greenwood Press. ISBN 978-0-313-30921-2.
- —— (2009). Catherine's Grandchildren: A Short History of the Russian-Germans under Soviet Rule. American Historical Society of Germans from Russia.
- Sapong, Nana Yaw B.; ——, eds. (2014). Replenishing History: New Directions to Historical Research in the 21st Century in Ghana. Legon: Ayebia Clarke Publishing. ISBN 978-0-9928436-0-1.
- —— (2022). The Years of Great Silence: The Deportation, Special Settlement, and Mobilization into the Labor Army of Ethnic Germans in the USSR, 1941–1955. Ibidem Press. ISBN 978-3-8382-1630-0.

=== Selected articles ===
- —— (June 1, 2000). "Stalin's genocide against the "Repressed Peoples"". Journal of Genocide Research. 2 (2): 267–293. doi:10.1080/713677598. ISSN 1462-3528.
- ——; Schmaltz, Eric J.; Vossler, Ronald J. (September 1, 2009). ""In our hearts we felt the sentence of death": ethnic German recollections of mass violence in the USSR, 1928–48". Journal of Genocide Research. 11 (2–3): 323–354. doi:10.1080/14623520903119035. ISSN 1462-3528.
- —— (2009). "Volk auf dem Weg: Transnational Migration of the Russian-Germans from 1763 to the Present Day". Studies in Ethnicity and Nationalism. 9 (2): 267–286. doi:10.1111/j.1754-9469.2009.01050.x. ISSN 1754-9469.
- —— (2008). "The Loss, Retention, and Reacquisition of Social Capital by Special Settlers in the USSR, 1941–1960". In Buckley, Cynthia J.; Ruble, Blair A.; Hofmann, Erin Trouth (eds.). Migration, Homeland, and Belonging in Eurasia. Woodrow Wilson Center Press. ISBN 978-0-8018-9075-8.
- —— (2016). "Nkrumah, the Cold War, the 'Third World', and the US Role in the 24 February 1966 Coup". In Lundt, Bea; Marx, Christopher (eds.). Kwame Nkrumah, 1909-1972: A Controversial Visionary. Franz Steiner Verlag. ISBN 978-3-515-11575-9.
- —— (2016). "The Persecution of Ethnic Germans in the USSR during World War II". The Russian Review. 75 (2): 284–303. doi:10.1111/russ.12075. ISSN 1467-9434.
