= Maki Mirage =

1920–1945 Soviet intelligence operation

Operation Maki Mirage or Maki-Mirage (Russian: Маки-Мираж, romanized: Maki-Mirazh) was a Soviet intelligence operation that involved 1200 plus Soviet intelligence agent-officers, that is, spies of East Asian descent being sent to China, Korea, Manchukuo (existing and under Japanese rule to 1945) and Mongolia (through Kiakhta) to perform intelligence gathering, "special tasks," and disinformation. The operation occurred primarily during the Interwar period, starting in the 1920s and continued into World War II. According to Soviet literature, the NKVD placed moles inside Japanese anti-Soviet operations (agentura). The Soviet moles supposedly uncovered an active network of 200 Japanese agents in the Soviet Far East during the 1930s. This network was never verified by reliable sources including Japanese (i.e. the 200 on Soviet territory were never proven to exist). Soviet intelligence (GRU and NKVD/INO) recruited over 1,200 East Asian agents—mostly Soviet Koreans and Soviet Chinese—for espionage against Japan in Manchuria/Manchukuo, China, Korea, and Mongolia. This figure corrects Jon Chang's first estimate of "over 600," after evidence showed recruitment came not only from the Chinese Lenin School (CLS), but also from Moscow's KUTV and KUTK universities (confirmed by Ancha, Tepliakov, Wilson Center documents, and Russian biographical articles on Lenintsev alumni). Two hundred of the twelve hundred plus EASI (EASI refers to East Asians in Soviet Intelligence) were recruited from the Red Army, the GRU, the Red Guards and the general population in the USSR from 1920 to 1945. Of the three universities, it is estimated that CLS produced 400 EASI, while the KUTK and the KUTV each produced approximately 300 EASI from 1920 to 1945. Leopold Trepper, a Soviet military intelligence (GRU) agent, confirmed that the KUTV and the KUTK were utilized to recruit East Asians into Soviet intelligence in his biography, The Great Game: The Story of the Red Orchestra. Operation Maki Mirage can be placed in the context of the Soviet Union utilizing their diaspora nationalities (i.e. non-Eastern Slav peoples or narody such as Greeks, Finns, Germans, Poles, Chinese, Turks, Koreans, Iranians and many others), otherwise treated as "last among socialist equals" and subject to forced deportations. However, in Russian historiography and documentary portrayals, the participation of over one thousand East Asian agents (who were Soviet citizens and foreigners, the latter were Chinese students studying in the USSR) was almost completely omitted and even when confirmed, this evidence was disregarded (see the picture of the eight NKVD officers, three of whom were Chinese).

== Summary ==
=== Background ===
The Soviet Union operated a vast human-intelligence/espionage program and a succession of secret-police agencies. Operation Maki-Mirage existed in a background of false flag or "deception operations" primarily aimed at convincing anti-Soviet, "revolutionary" groups and conspirators outside of the USSR to return and link up with other, established, anti-Soviet, underground revolutionaries. Once they returned, however, they were immediately arrested, as the aforementioned anti-Bolshevik, fifth columnists were completely fictional. Similar operations included Operation Trust, Operation Syndicate-2, and the Tagantsev conspiracy. The Soviet intelligence operations Shogun and Dreamers also operated in the Russian Far East during the same period as Maki-Mirage. Chang has named them all simply "Maki-Mirage." Maki-Mirage, however, was not a false flag operation. It was for the most part an aggressive forward operation in intelligence (undertaking assassination, recruitment, reconnaissance, destruction of socio-political personages, targets and other measures) to disrupt and instill fear that the existing regimes in China and the Japanese empire could not rule and protect their citizens.

The Chinese-Lenin School of Vladivostok was established for the official purpose of educating students and turning them into socialist comrades and acolytes to spread socialism throughout East Asia. It was one of the major espionage training centers of the Soviet Union, opened in late 1924 and ran until early 1938. Its students included Red Army veterans, generally Soviet Koreans and Soviet Chinese born or raised in the USSR (the Soviet Chinese were typically born in China and came to the USSR as children or adolescents in the period of the 1920s-1930s), and Chinese students from China recruited in the USSR.

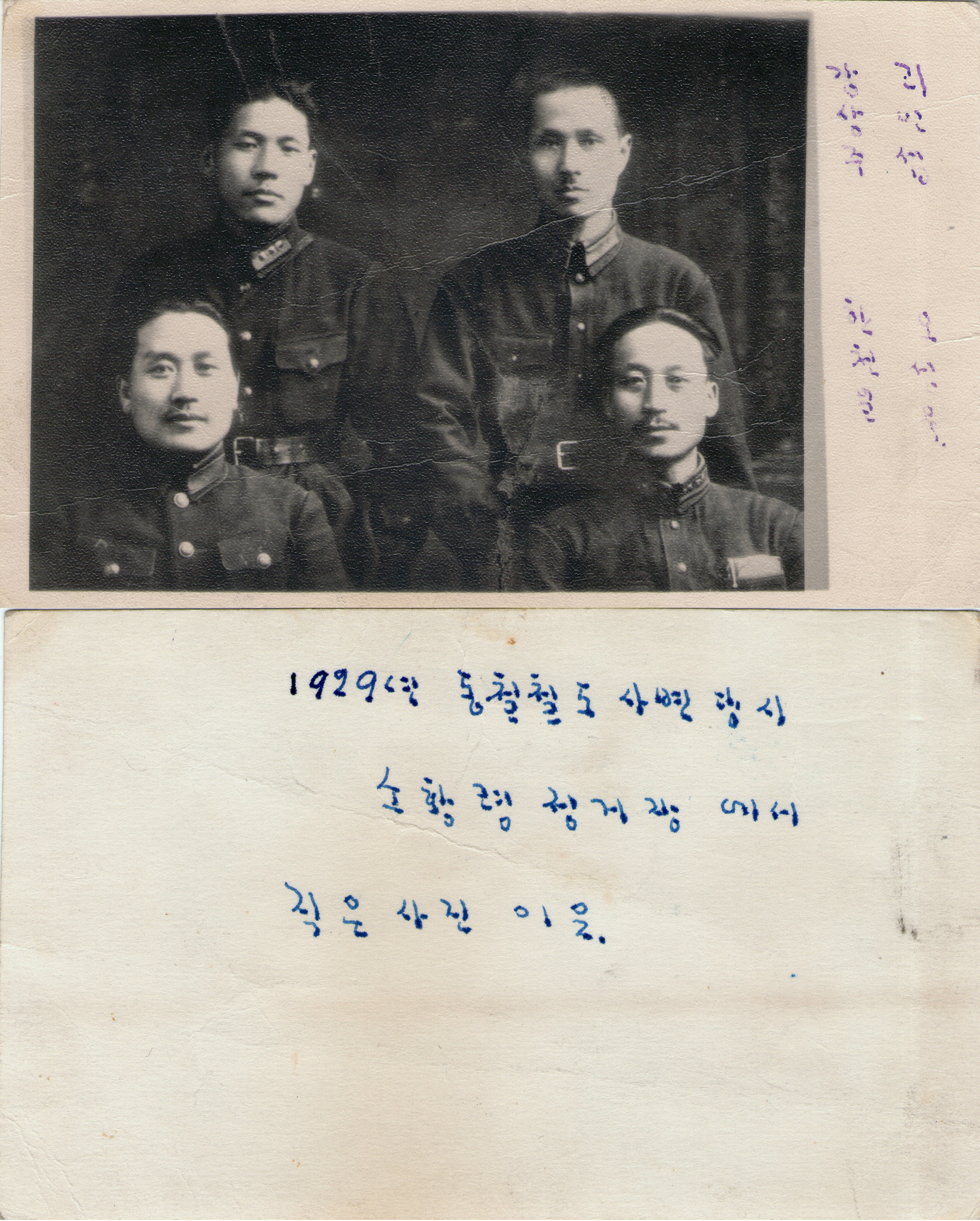
The four Koreans are: (first row, bottom, l-r) Khan Chan Ger (Grigorii Eliseevich) and O Son Muk. Top row (l-r): Kan San Chu and Li In Seb. Khan Chan Ger and Li In Seb wore OGPU uniforms. Kan and O wore Red Army uniforms.

The Soviet Union saw its diaspora peoples as allegedly disloyal leading to numerous deportations, including the Soviet deportation of Koreans and Soviet deportations of Chinese. Nonetheless, the Soviet secret police employed many of its diaspora peoples in their espionage operations, with major examples including the Soviet-German spy Rudolf Abel (originally William Fisher, of Russian and German descent) and the Ingrian Finnish-Soviet spy Reino Häyhänen. The revelations made by this "Maki Mirage" page are not limited to just East Asians in Soviet intelligence. It extends to many other Soviet nationalities who were deported as "spies for foreign, capitalist-imperialist governments [Poland, Germany, Finland, Iran, Turkey, German, etc.]" and yet, a significant part of their national-minority communities served Soviet intelligence for over twenty years total (fifteen years before the Great Terror when the "accusations of being traitors" began and seven-to-eight years afterwards). Making an extrapolation from Sudoplatov's "order of battle" for the INO, NKVD (that there were 16 INO, NKVD sections with 20,000 administrative staff and agent-officers all to handle intelligence matters abroad; with only two of the sixteen sections handling the RFE, China, Korea—simply named "the Far East"), the largest contingents of INO, NKVD would likely have been composed of Soviet Poles, Germans and possibly Turks. These groups only appear in single digits (Hayhanen and Fisher) because no historian or researcher went into their communities (after 1991) to conduct interviews and collect photos.

Moreover, this was not the first Maki Mirage-like operation (using Soviet natsmen – Russian: нацмен, lit. 'representatives of national minorities') for William Fisher. Sometime shortly after Aug. 1939 and the Molotov–Ribbentrop Pact, Fisher (a Baltic German) and Adamovich (a Soviet Pole) were sent to Ukraine to meet ethnic Germans, Poles and Ukrainians to stir up anti-Nazi sentiment in the nearby areas and countries. They proclaimed to be refugees from communism during the invasion of Poland, using a provision that Nazi Germany and the USSR had agreed upon for the migration of Soviet Germans.

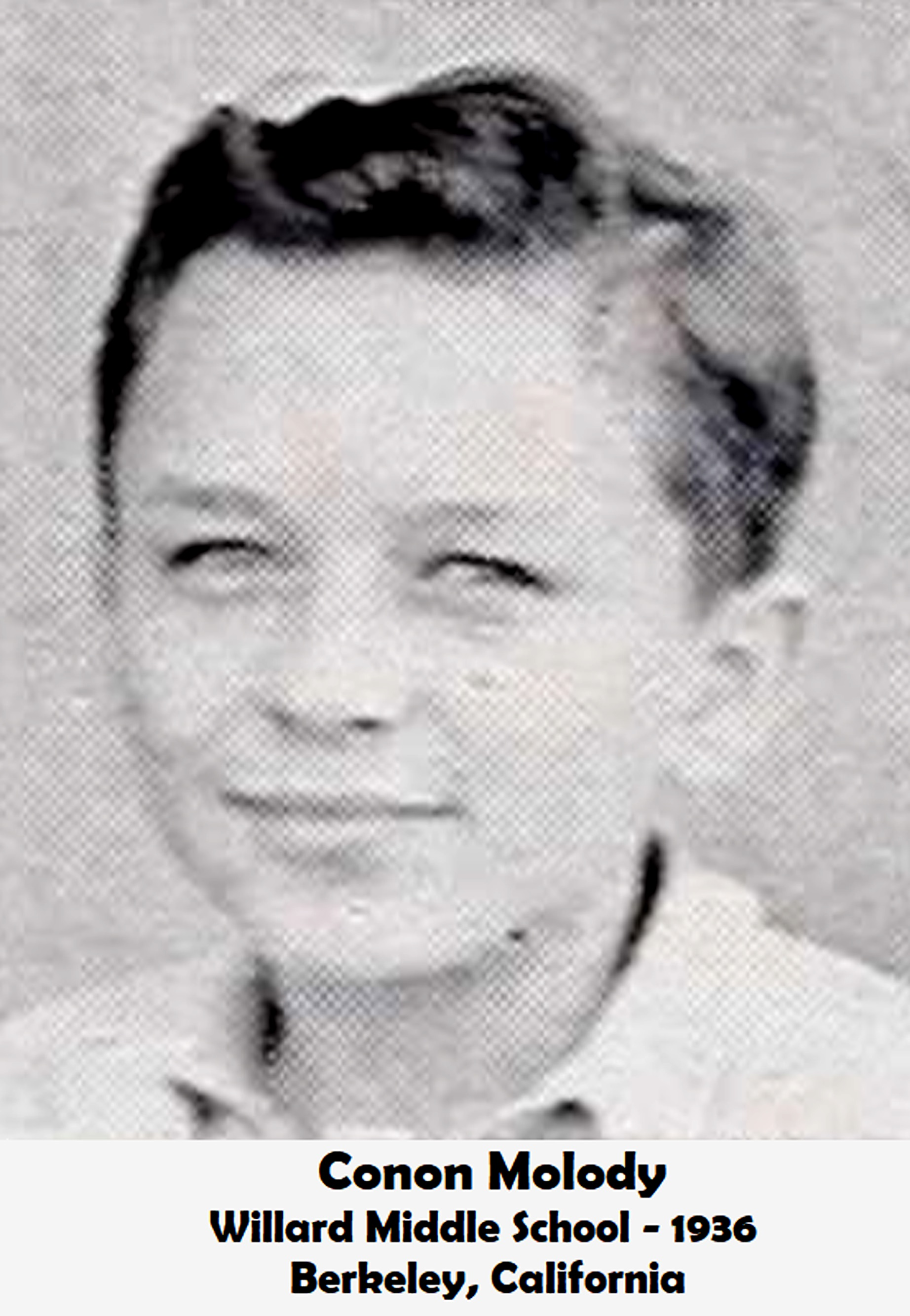
Konon Molody- William Fisher's Partner in the INO, NKVD during 1943-1944 ( Byelorussia and Berlin)

In January 1943, Konon Molody (also a Soviet INO, NKVD agent) was parachuted into western Byelorussia. In this account (told by Molody himself), he was Fisher's partner. Molody's legend and documents stated that he was a Byelorussian Volksdeutsche (a German in diaspora, from outside of Germany). Germany occupied western Byelorussia. German soldiers found "problems" with his documents and he was arrested and held in a prison. Soon a German Abwehr intelligence officer came to interrogate Molody. This officer's name was Alec (who in reality was Willie Fisher, a Soviet INO agent also with Volksdeutsche papers who in real life was fluent in German). Alec, in the course of the interrogation, offered Molody service in the Abwehr as an agent behind Soviet lines. But first there would have to be a medical examination. Molody was found to have a medical defect, failed and did not receive work in the Abwehr. However, he was now free. Molody then began working (surreptitiously) as Alec's (that is Fisher's) radioman encoding and sending his messages back to Moscow. Both men terminated this mission sometime in early 1944. Fisher was transferred by the Abwehr to Berlin around March, 1944 while Molody began a new assignment also in Berlin at around the same time. Note that Fisher had probably arrived in Byelorussia by the middle of 1942. When examining Viliam Genrikh Fisher (Willie Fisher) and comparing him to Sorge, Fisher's strength was to move from one operation to the next seamlessly while producing excellent results and few problems for his superiors. He produced major intelligence accomplishments as a mole in one after another assignment "machine-like." Sorge on the other hand was absolutely profligate.

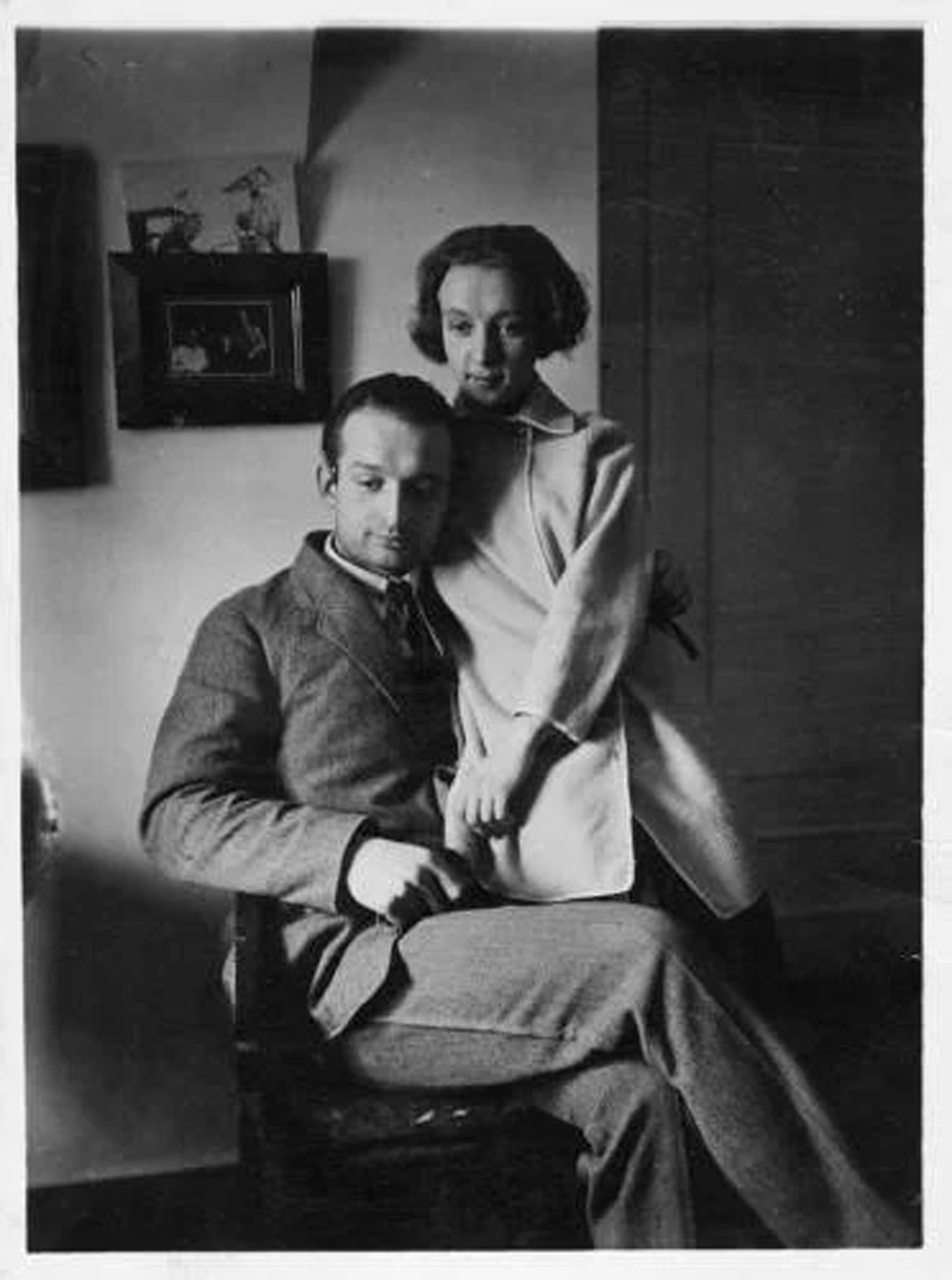
Willie Fisher w wife Evelyn, circa 1927 USSR

Jerzy Niezbrzycki (who worked in Polish intelligence as Niezbrzycki, while using the pseudonym Ryszard Wraga when working for U.S. academia) mentioned the capture of a Soviet Pole working under the administration of the INO, NKVD. This man was from Ukraine and spoke Polish with a slight accent (assumed Ukrainian or Russian). He was captured in Poland, agreed to work as a double agent, but then reneged and agreed to a jail term in Poland rather than a return to Russia. The Soviet Pole (Niezbrzycki's) and Häyhänen went to great lengths to build their "legends," that is, backstory as locals. The Pole spent lavishly on his girlfriend taking trips to Warsaw with fine dining, cabarets and other assorted nightlife that were part of courtship and "good living." The intent was to marry a local in order to obtain citizenship, the right residency and work permits and have a layer of protection from suspicion. Häyhänen padded his "legend" by going to extreme lengths, even though he had one significant advantage over the Pole as Soviet agents. Reino spoke Finnish as a native speaker. First, Reino along with a Soviet agent (from Lapland) headed north to the Arctic Circle. There, they found Sámi who were willing to corroborate (for a fee) his residence and work in Lapland from 1943 to 1949. Heading south to Tampere, he then courted and married a local Finnish girl, Hanna Kurikka.

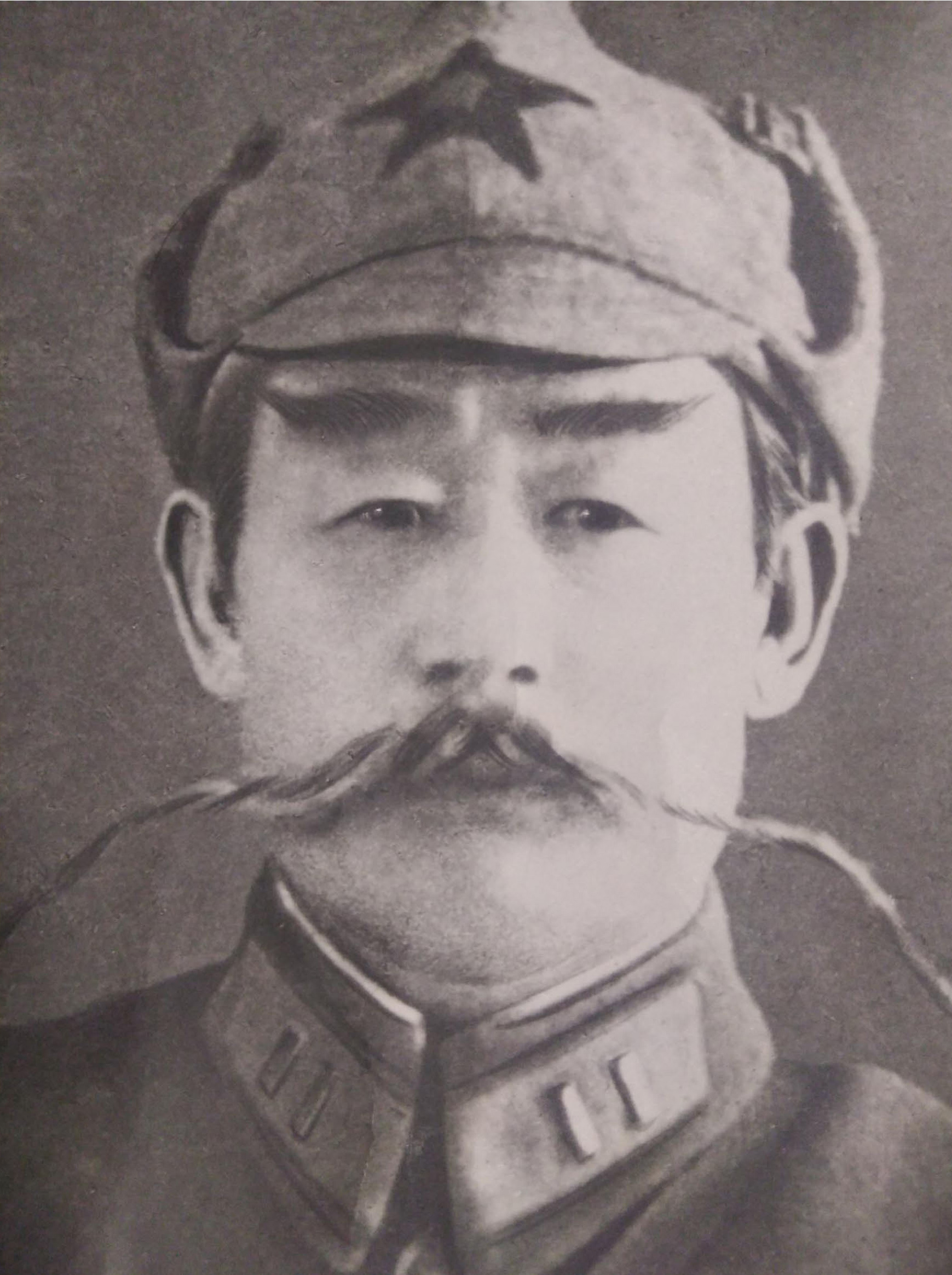
Van In Zun, in Red Army uniform, Chita, Russia, 1921. Van joined the GPU-OGPU in 1922

The diaspora peoples were utilized by Soviet intelligence because they possessed cultural and linguistic knowledge (and for some, the knowledge of many different registers within a particular language or culture). These are knowledge, abilities and nuances that one cannot simply learn in a controlled, artificial environment like a classroom nor in a lockstep manner. Finally, they possessed the right phenotype to play their roles. Truthfully, they had played these "ethnic" roles from the beginning of their Soviet education (detskii sad-preschool) and their first Soviet passports and documents (the Soviet passport, their military ID's and even housing documents- the propiska) listed ethnicity called natsional'nost.

=== Methodologies: Why Not Oral History, Fieldwork in situ and Digitization ===
A major weakness of how history is being presently written is based on methodologies. The word "methodologies" presents the question, "What sources will the historian, political scientist, anthropologist or academic use while researching a social science such as X, Y or Z studies, history, anthropology or political science?" The majority of those researchers writing academic history, political science and other fields tends to use almost exclusively state archives. Then, the same professors, researchers or academics claim to have written the "definitive history of X, Y or Z in the USSR."

This is simply not possible especially when a percentage of all the Soviet archives (e.g. 20%- this is just an estimate) are off limits and another percentage were destroyed or deleted during periodical "archival cleaning" cycles. The absolute best evidence of the GULAG archive instructions for purging/deleting/burning files is from Khlevniuk's The History of the Gulag. High level government instructions (from Moscow to the periphery), orders and policy papers were to be held permanently (regarding each camp or GULAG). However, prisoner complaints, official meetings between local NKVD to solve camp problems and other archival files/documents chronicling a social or individual history of camp guards and prisoners were periodically burned (every 3 to 5 years). Khlevniuk noted an unspoken code among Soviet cadres in the Stalinist regime which included those in the Politburo and the Central Committee. Robert Conquest paraphrasing Khlevniuk in the foreword to The History of the Gulag explained, "For the most secret information the rule was 'word of mouth only.' The deepest secrets thus remain untraceable, except by deduction."

Nikita Khrushchev (in addition to Stalin) culled the Soviet archives of his involvement in various purges (especially those of the Ukrainian CP during the Holodomor and generally, during the Great Terror). He even appointed Ivan Serov, the head of the KGB to do this delicate task for him during the mid-to-late 1950s. There are more examples of Khrushchev and Stalin culling the Soviet archives. Regarding Stalin, take for example his correspondence with Vycheslav Molotov, the 2nd in command of the USSR during the 1930s. The vast majority of the letters were culled, that is destroyed and removed, leaving only innocuous letters which contained little to no political activity, decrees nor activities. Robert Tucker wrote, "The contents of these letters suggest that only the most 'harmless' documents, those that in no way touched upon Stalin's and Molotov's darkest and most criminal activities, were selected for the archive." These notes (above) and those (below regarding "sculpting" and "gardening") demonstrate how serious the USSR was about information control and the control of history through "culling" the Soviet archives.

Thus, those researchers and academics relying almost exclusively on the Soviet state archives and yet proposing to shed new light or make radical advances about Soviet/Russian history, Stalinism, Soviet Korean or other minority people's deportation or "secret" histories are simply reusing the archival well for the thousandth or millionth time. The phrase, "there's nothing new under the sun," is quite fitting if one replaces the word "sun" with "archives." (regarding the "open" Russian and Soviet archives- not the off-limits archives controlled by the FSB). This Maki Mirage page is an example of what scholars can find, collect and produce by going into a particular ethnic, religious, or place of origin/shared identity community, conducting interviews (oral history) and collecting photos from personal albums (fieldwork). These two methodologies provide the means by which a historical event can almost always be examined more deeply or from a radically different perspective. State archives provided secondary supplementation. The core contribution of the Maki Mirage case to social-science methodology is its demonstration that breakthrough discoveries arise from broad, primary-source bases rather than iterative theorizing atop prior theories. Methodological richness and source diversity remain the decisive factors in rigorous social-science research, yet they are rarely adopted.

=== The History, "Capricious" Loyalties and Difficulties of Conducting Soviet Espionage in Manchuria ===
In Operation Maki-Mirage, East Asian and "Russian" agents were both sent to China (largely Manchuria) and Korea to perform espionage in groups of up to a dozen. The "Russian" agents were seen with suspicion in East Asia, but most importantly, those in Manchuria (Manchukuo by early 1932) were too conspicuous. Most Soviet GRU and OGPU/NKVD agents (the "Russians") spoke a smattering of Chinese and (less common) Japanese which was often difficult to understand despite the fact that they may have finished courses in the language in Russia at "Oriental Institutes." For these agents, the majority of their contacts were within the "Russian" and former Tsarist citizen communities in Manchuria. Their "Russian" informants (being a mixture of Russians, Ukrainians, Georgians, Tatars, Jews and others) also informed on them because their goal was simply to earn a living and survive economically. Information was their currency and means of sustenance.

Most former Tsarist citizens, Whites (White Guards) and the so-called "Russians" (a wide encompassing term) in Manchuria did not have strong and or clearly defined loyalties to the Soviet regime despite many "Russians" and Russian speakers taking Soviet citizenship from 1925 onwards and many returning to the USSR after 1935. After 1920, the greatest need was simply to eat and find a means of sustenance. Many professed "sudden" loyalties to the Soviets as the lesser of two evils, for example, when faced with unemployment or when faced with the ever increasing power and clout exercised by the Japanese or Chinese. Some Russian emigres also served the Japanese military after the formation of Manchukuo in 1932, formalized in the Asano Detachment (of the Kwantung Army) after 1938. The Asano detachment, named after its colonel Asano Takashi, was made up almost entirely of Russian troops. Because Japan and the Soviet Union did not erupt into open war until 1945, the Asano detachment's military activities were limited to sparse acts of sabotage along the Soviet border.

The U.S. intelligence report, "Japanese Intelligence on Soviet Intentions near End of World War II" noted that many White Russians had sold their services to both the Japanese (the Manchukuo regime) and the Soviets. It stated, "About two hundred White Russians were successfully used in Manchuria to translate incoming documents, but there were always Soviet agents among them, some of whom were not detected until the end of the war. Therefore, the Japanese believe that the greatest caution should be used in employing White Russians in any classified intelligence work, especially in areas contiguous to Soviet territory or to Soviet-occupied areas."

The constantly shifting "sands" of political loyalty and power/authority, made the goal of deception and cover for Soviet intelligence nearly impossible. Thus, the Soviets pivoted towards their "natsmen" (means "national minority"- natsional'noe menshinstvo) agent-officers. In some cases, the East Asian Soviet agents performed and were required to perform the primary "special tasks" of reconnaissance, stealing and obtaining cipher machines/code books, assassination and blowing up relevant socio-political targets. In others (cases), they stayed in the background. The Soviet state archives said that the operation was to combat 200 Japanese spies, but surrounding evidence suggests that the Soviet claim of counterintelligence there was likely a front for more forward operations (also known as "active measures"). The Soviet operation utilized multiple layers of deception. Operationally, perhaps Operation Trust was on a greater scale (funding, monies, use of informants, agent-officers and especially analysts and admin. staff to influence or produce newspaper articles and printed or recorded media and disinformation). Trust required more time to charm and then persuade the ex-Whites, Monarchists and other anti-Soviet and ex-Tsarist military and government officials who were all living abroad that a real, verifiable fifth column movement existed in the USSR. Sometimes, the OGPU and NKVD agentura in several European countries (outside the USSR) were utilized. For example, one agent in France and one in Germany or Spain. Each performing one step in luring the said personage back to the USSR.

However, tactically, (Operation) Maki Mirage was a clear advancement over previous operations with two sets of agent-officers ready to be deployed (the "Russians" or the East Asians). The Japanese had the Soviet agents on Manchukuo soil spotted, tailed and covered. At least some of the sigint (such as radio) was traced and intercepted. Whether these communications were interpreted and or deciphered correctly is a different issue. The larger question remains, "How were the Soviets able to undertake their 'special tasks' of assassinations, bombings, spying, and other acts of diversion, wrecking and political intrigue when almost all of the 'bases' were covered?" The Soviets were able to pull off their operations and attacks on foreign soil because of two sets of agents ready for use in Operation Maki Mirage (1920s to 1940s) which were their "Russians" (Jews, Russians, Ukrainians, Cossacks, Poles, Armenians, Georgians, mixed Slav-European, etc.) and their East Asians (Koreans and Chinese and interestingly, Chinese students studying in the USSR). This page explains the "how" and the "why." It's not simply because of human diversity, but "human diversity with applicable skills" (the foundation was high intelligence and then people of dual or triple cultural backgrounds, identities and linguistic abilities). Many of the "Russian" agents reportedly spoke four, five and six languages, but Chang's interviews with some of the East Asians agent-officers revealed that some of these agents (the "Russians") simply spoke a smattering of pidgin Chinese, Korean or Japanese, which could not pass as being fully conversant in that language (versus knowing various registers of a language: street, informal, formal, academic, business, technical, etc. and knowing when and which register is being spoken/used). Take for instance, this question, "how many of the Russian agents spoke Chinese or Japanese versus how many claimed that they spoke Chinese or Japanese?" At best, for most agents, except those raised in Manchuria by (e.g.) a Chinese amah or with a retinue of servants and household staff, most knew what would be considered "kitchen" Chinese compared with native speakers. There were also those whose pronunciation of the East Asian languages was not understandable or up to par. There were some who could not adapt despite being polyglots in European languages. Those who were really polyglots and completely fluent in the said foreign languages were in the vast minority (versus padding the abilities of Soviet agentura).

Those NKVD language schools weren't like the courses that you have today at the university where there are books, tapes and everything well planned out. You were learning actually very little compared to today and it was dependent on the teacher how much you could learn. Once the 'Russians' got on the ground [in the Far East], their understanding of Chinese or Korean was very little and their pronunciation was even worse. What they learned was not the real language on the street [a mix of many different vernaculars]. The 'Russian' agents understood and spoke a pidgin form of Chinese or Korean. But never in the reports did anyone admit to the training being insufficient/substandard or that they understood very little once they arrived in China, Manchuria or Korea. That's not what the NKVD does (Interviews with the 7th family of an EASI—a daughter and a granddaughter, Bishkek, Kyrgyzstan).

The background of the agents included East Asian (Korean and Chinese) and "Russian" agents (The term "Russian" refers more generally to Europeans from the USSR and former Russian empire to include Russians, Russified Ukrainians, Jews, Tatars, and Georgians). The East Asian agents could conduct their work and lives in Manchuria without suspicion and enter areas unnoticed (seen to be simply "locals"), while "Russian" agents were more conspicuous in their lives and relationships. The "Russians" were more likely to have relatives, associates and close friends with properties in Dalian, Harbin or elsewhere in Manchuria, limiting the capabilities to perform sabotage tasks without facing death, easy capture or retribution (the latter referring to capture, interrogation, torture and possible death to their friends, associates and relatives). Many also lived very ostentatiously considering that they were agent-officers conducting "secret" intelligence work. Some brazenly courted and maintained lovers/girlfriends/boyfriends from the Russian speaking community in Manchuria and China. If the "Russians" couldn't (figuratively speaking) "pull the trigger" without Soviet intelligence being countered or facing a grave threat, it was then that the East Asians were sent to finish the job. In other cases, the EASI were given the primary responsibilities, but this was in the minority of cases. The primary agents to carry out the "special tasks" were still the "Russians."

=== Japanese Intelligence in Manchuria: Smitten by Vice Operations and Their Profits ===
The Kwantung Army (and IJA) had a military intelligence department (the 2nd Section) and an ultranationalist subdivision called Tokumu Kikan. But Tokumu Kikan and the 2nd Section (of the IJA) planned few if any retaliatory campaigns targeting Soviet operatives in Manchuria. There is no mention of Japanese counter-intelligence operations against the Soviets in Manchuria beyond "monitoring." Tokumu Kikan did put approximately 200 operatives on the Manchurian-Russian border observing and collecting information after Soviet border measures had tightened (Llewelyn 2021, 9). These, however, are not the "active measures" which one would expect from a secret society whose many Nakano School graduates were trained to infiltrate and sabotage. The 2nd Section also tried to build anti-Soviet groups in Manchuria among the "Russians" such as the Brotherhood of Russian Truth and others to use as a military or espionage/intelligence force for them. But they had become so degraded (militarily) and demoralized that once organized they simply focused on their own local, Manchurian politics and rivalries. Their factional politics made organizations impossible and thus, the IJA (Imperial Japanese Army) dropped this idea.

Instead, the 2nd Section's main focus was on opium production, distribution and growing their profits for a select group of military leaders and Japanese industrialists. From opium, they branched out into other lucrative, lateral vice industries such as gambling and prostitution. Both Tokumu Kikan and Kempeitai (the military police) operated vice dens and establishments through Chinese, Korean, Japanese and Russian figureheads. At least, the Soviets kept true to the mission. Japan's intelligence operatives in Manchuria went far off-course in Manchuria while still proclaiming "Asia for Asians."

=== Historiography ===
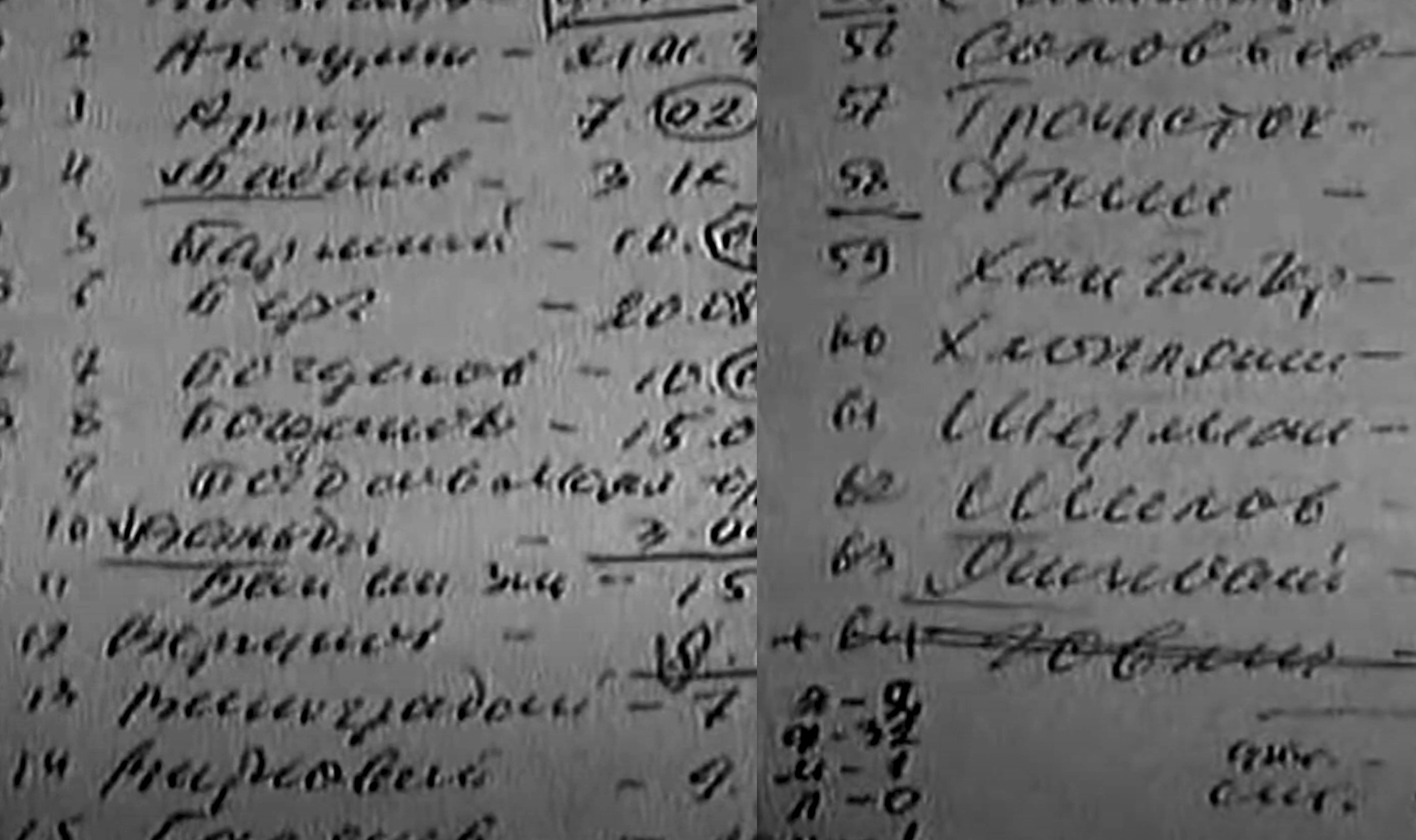
Participants in Operation Maki Mirage, including Khan Chan Ger [written Хан Чан Гер, name #59 on list] and Van In Zyn [Ван Ин Зун, name #11 on list].

The historical background and data (information, facts, names, etc.) on the operation were kept secret at least 2014 when Ancha and Miz's 1st edition of Chinese Diaspora in Vladivostok was published. But this book was never released to the public, only the 2nd edition was. Post-Soviet historiography and documentary portrayals have omitted the East Asian contributions to Soviet history and intelligence. The historian Jon K. Chang performed interviews gathering family histories of Koreans and Chinese in Central Asia and research corroborated by Soviet era photographs, that highlighted the roles of Soviet Koreans in the historical operation. He points out that the 2008 Russian film, Operatsiia: Agent Prizrak (Операция «Агент призрак») which focuses exclusively on the "Russian" (including other Russified European groups) agents, incidentally includes a shot with a list of names of agents in Operation Maki Mirage, which includes two of the omitted East Asian officers (EASI). Incidentally, they were two of the most important: Khan Chan Ger and Van In Zun. Khan and Van (Wang in English) were the leaders (nachal'niki) of the Korean and Chinese OGPU/NKVD regiments respectively. It was specifically mentioned in Khisamutdinov's The Russian Far East: Historical Essays that the Soviet Korean and Chinese deportations were carried out by Korean and Chinese regiments (respectively) of the NKVD in 1937–1938. (Khisamutdinov also gives other facts and data on the Korean and Chinese deportations).

However, Grigorii Eliseevich Khan (Khan Chan Ger) was arrested on Sept. 3, 1937. Thus, despite being the highest ranking East Asian in the NKVD, he was removed before the start of the Korean deportation. Nikolai Van (Van In Zun) may have participated in the Chinese deportation. He, tellingly, was only arrested after the Chinese deportation was completed on May 5, 1938. (The last of the three stages of the Chinese deportation took place in March-beginning of April, 1938). Chang sees the historiography of Operation Maki-Mirage as emblematic of how national minorities in the USSR had been minimized and neglected in history.

== Operation Maki Mirage: The history of East Asians in Soviet intelligence ==
=== Background ===
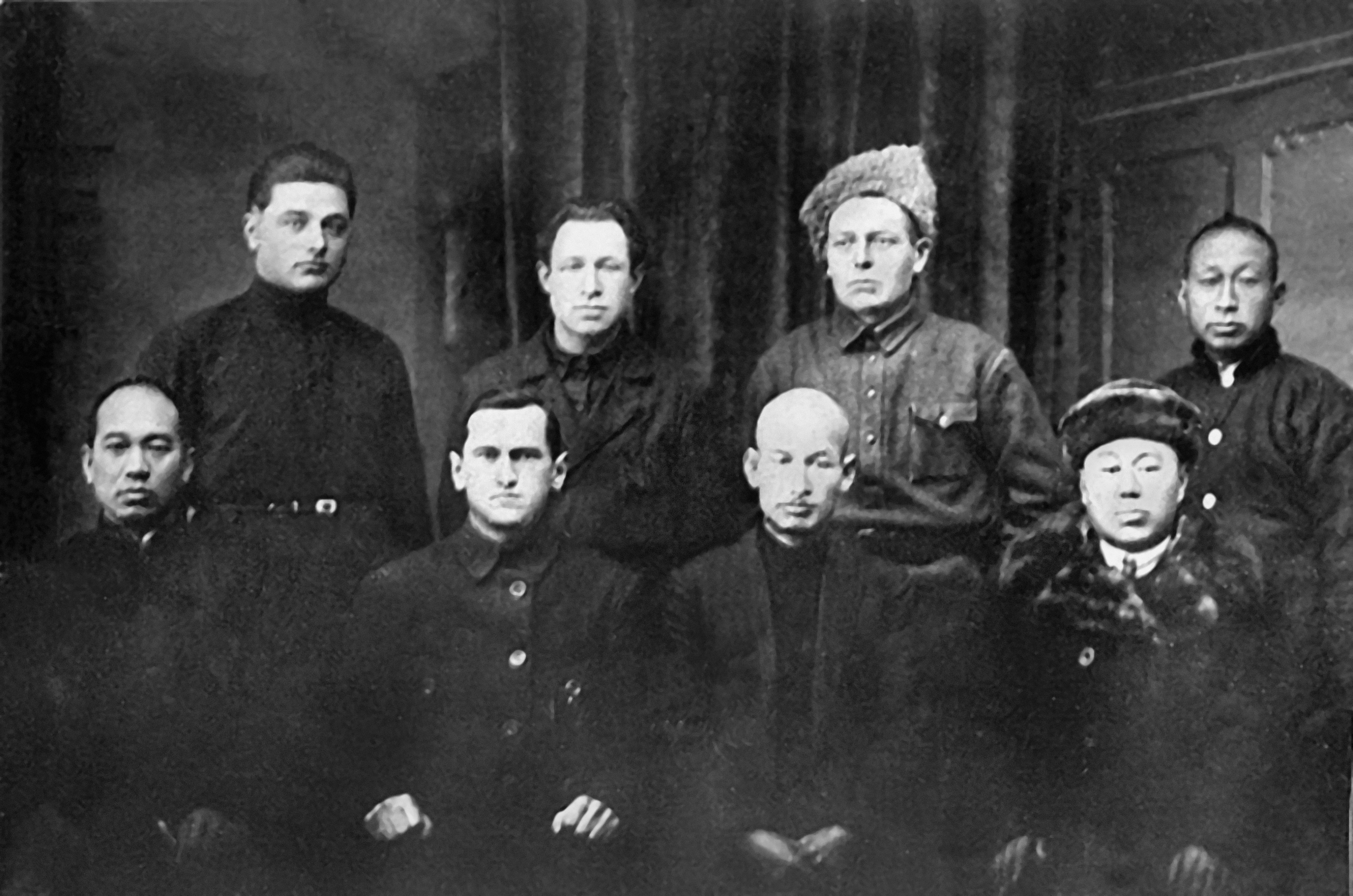
OGPU/NKVD officers taken in Blagoveshchensk. Operation Maki Mirage- 1930s

Maki Mirage was a Soviet intelligence operation conducted purportedly against Japanese intelligence in the Russian Far East. According to Soviet sources, the Japanese had some two hundred agents in the Zabaikal and Russian Far East regions collecting information and performing acts of espionage, information collection and sabotage. Upon further investigation, the Soviet claim of Maki Mirage being a Soviet "counter-intelligence" operation falls apart. They employed too few resources and agent-officers to oppose a force of two hundred who were supposedly already active on Soviet soil, while Soviet offensive espionage in Japan and elsewhere had been successful for many years.

Roman Nikolaevich Kim (b. 1899 Vladivostok) was a Soviet Korean raised and educated in Japan, who from 1922 was a secret agent of the GPU (State Political Directorate) codenamed "Marten", possibly being recruited as early as 1921 by the Cheka. As a Soviet agent, Kim performed extensive "counterespionage" missions ranging from ciphers to disinformation and other operations against Japan. He may have been involved in the forgery of the Tanaka Memorial. According to historian Hiroaki Kuromiya, it is possible that a blackmail plot on Michitaro Komatsubara masterminded by Roman Kim may have assisted the Soviet victory at Khalkin-gol in Mongolia in 1939. More definitively, Kim was in constant cooperation with the Soviet military intelligence in the 1930s. In 1934, Roman Kim had received the title of "honorable Chekist" and became agent for "special assignments" of the NKVD. This was supposedly to counter Japanese espionage on the European continent.

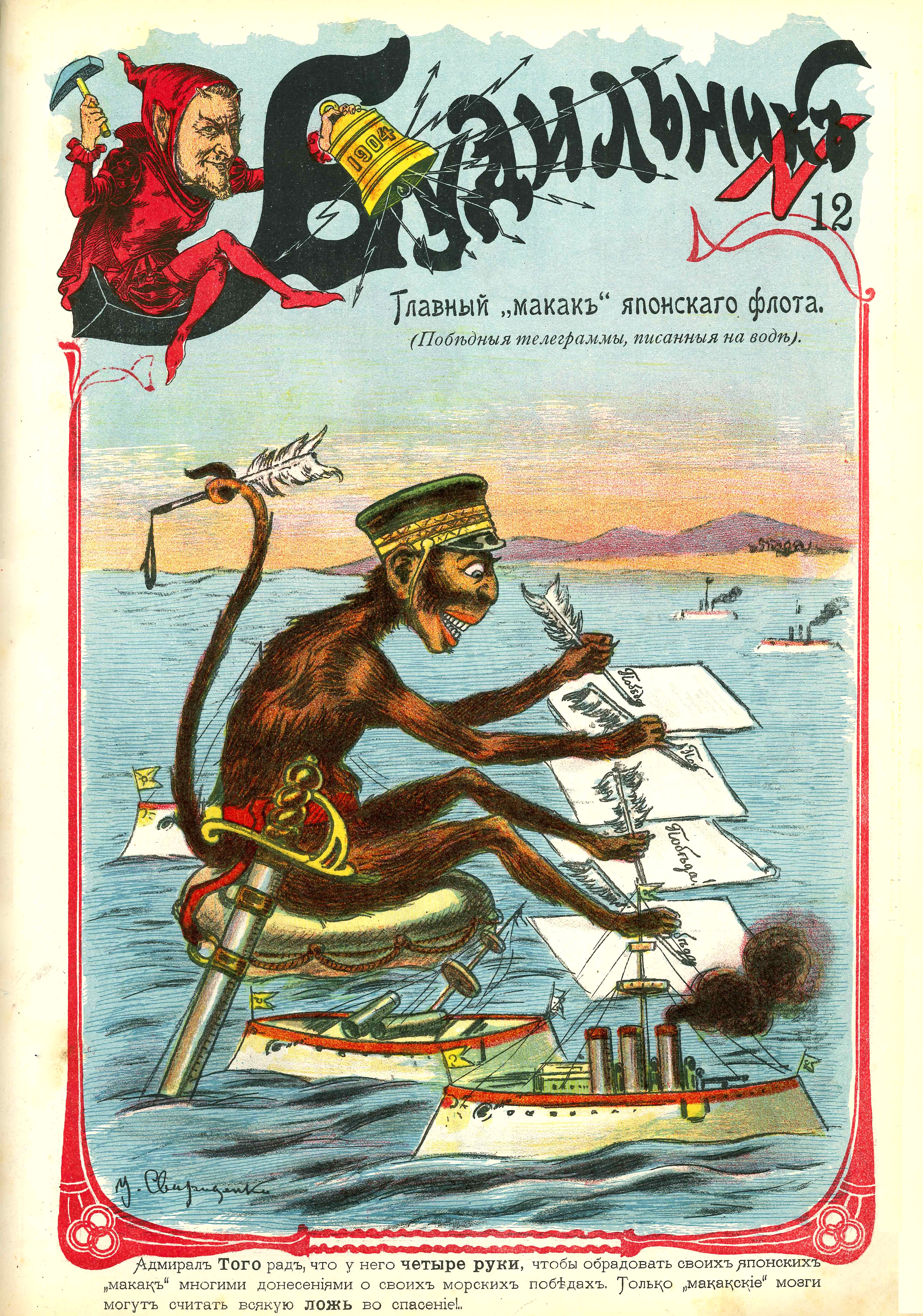
The "Maki" (Маки) in "Maki-Mirage" (Маки-Мираж) is a shortening of "Makaki" (Макаки) meaning "macaques" (monkeys). This was a derogatory chauvinist/racist trope against the Japanese. While the origin was purportedly from the Japanese intervention in the Russian civil war, the usage of this trope dated back much further, as shown by this image from the Russian Empire satirical magazine Budilnik, 1904. The turn of the 20th century was a time when the Yellow Peril trope was propagandized heavily.

After years of serving the Soviet Union, Kim was arrested in the midst of the Great Purge in 1937 and accused of being a Japanese spy. Tortured in the jail of Lubianka, he went along with his interrogators' belief that he was a Japanese spy, spinning a desperate boastful tale convincing the secret police interrogators. Roman Kim 'confessed' that he was a Japanese espionage station chief and illegitimate son of a foreign minister, making him a valuable target. Filip Kovačević writes, "By contrast, all the other counterintelligence officers from his unit, all of his superiors, and even the NKVD officer who had signed his arrest order, were shot." Two years later, after the Soviet Union had killed nearly all of its specialists in Japanese and/or Korean, Kim was deployed as an agent again. When Lavrentiy Beria became NKVD chief in 1938, he freed Roman Kim and used him as a translator—he had acted as a translator even in his prison cell in Lubianka. In 1939, Beria sent Kim on another spy mission, in the midst of the Battle of Khalkin-gol. After WWII, Kim became an author of Soviet spy fiction, fighting a "literary Cold War". New research by G. Serscikov has unveiled the case of a Soviet Korean illegal, Evgenii Kim, who served during the Soviet and post-Soviet periods, from 1967 to 1995 in Japan. Serscikov's research reveals many details about Kim's intelligence work and career. The article on Evgenii Kim (spelled Evgeny) revealed much more than the Roman Kim articles Finally, Serscikov in his "HUMINT Operations Abroad" article erroneously listed Jon K. Chang as a source for the Soviet state's rendition of events that 200 actual Japanese spies were uncovered in the USSR in the 1930s. Serscikov could not be more wrong. All of Chang's articles on East Asians in Soviet intelligence point out that the EASI participated in INO missions abroad for the Soviet state. These (which constituted Maki Mirage from 1920 to 1945) were "forward operations" rather counterintelligence.

Chang in his 2019 conference paper "EASI: New Paradigms and Methods" noted that both the Soviets and the Russian Federation were writing accounts of Operation Maki Mirage which completely ignore and omit the contributions of the 1200 East Asian agents who participated in it. These accounts (through over ten newspaper articles, several documentaries and academic books on Maki Mirage—all published since the year 2000 in Russia) are chauvinistic (i.e. racist) and marginalize the contributions of the USSR's ethnic minorities. Chang emphasizes that to tell the full story of the USSR and its various intelligence services (both military and political police), the full history must include the contributions of the EASI during Maki Mirage. The EASI were the USSR's best "deep cover" spies in the Far East and those who were best at developing "local" networks of informants in the local vernaculars.

According to historians Kuromiya and Peplonski, in the Great Terror, alleged "Japanese spies" (an accusation leveled mainly against Koreans and Chinese and employees of the CER) and "Polish spies" were both targeted disproportionately, even more so than the main, explicitly recognized threat of German spies. In the years leading up to Molotov-Ribbentrop Pact, "because Germany was personally ruled by Hitler as the Soviet Union was by Stalin, Stalin found it easier to deal with Germany [than the Second Polish Republic or Japan]." The authors point out "NKVD statistics show that in 1937-1938, 101,965 people were arrested as Polish spies, 52,906 as Japanese spies and 39,300 as German spies to be followed by Latvian, Finnish, Estonian, Romanian, Greek and other 'spies.'"

Furthermore, "Polish-Japanese undercover work was serious enough to concern Stalin deeply. Iagoda, a past master of counterintelligence, carried out "Trest"-like [false flag] operations in the Far East, right up until the Great Terror, i.e., until he was replaced by Ezhov. Ezhov attacked Iagoda's operations and decimated his foreign intelligence cadres". Besides "Maki-Mirage", the Soviets also operated a multitude of other operations such as "Dreamers", "Shogun", and "Organizator" against Japan. Typically, the Soviets had their own agents acting as "anti-Soviet elements" to attract the interests of Japan, Chinese and Russian diaspora groups and individuals across the Soviet borders (typically Manchuria/Manchukuo and China proper). These operations relied on "false fronts" not proxy organizations. In 1930, the Soviets had also operated a fake Japanese agent in 1930 in Ingushetia to entrap anti-Soviet "Polish" intelligence. Koreans residing and working in Ukraine were also being repressed and sentenced as "agents of Japanese espionage".

==== Soviet spy training schools ====
There were various universities in the USSR that existed for the training of foreign communist cadres and intelligence operatives. Soviet GRU agent Trepper stated that just among the students in Moscow at the four universities were between 2,000 and 3,000 students annually (though not all were to work in intelligence).

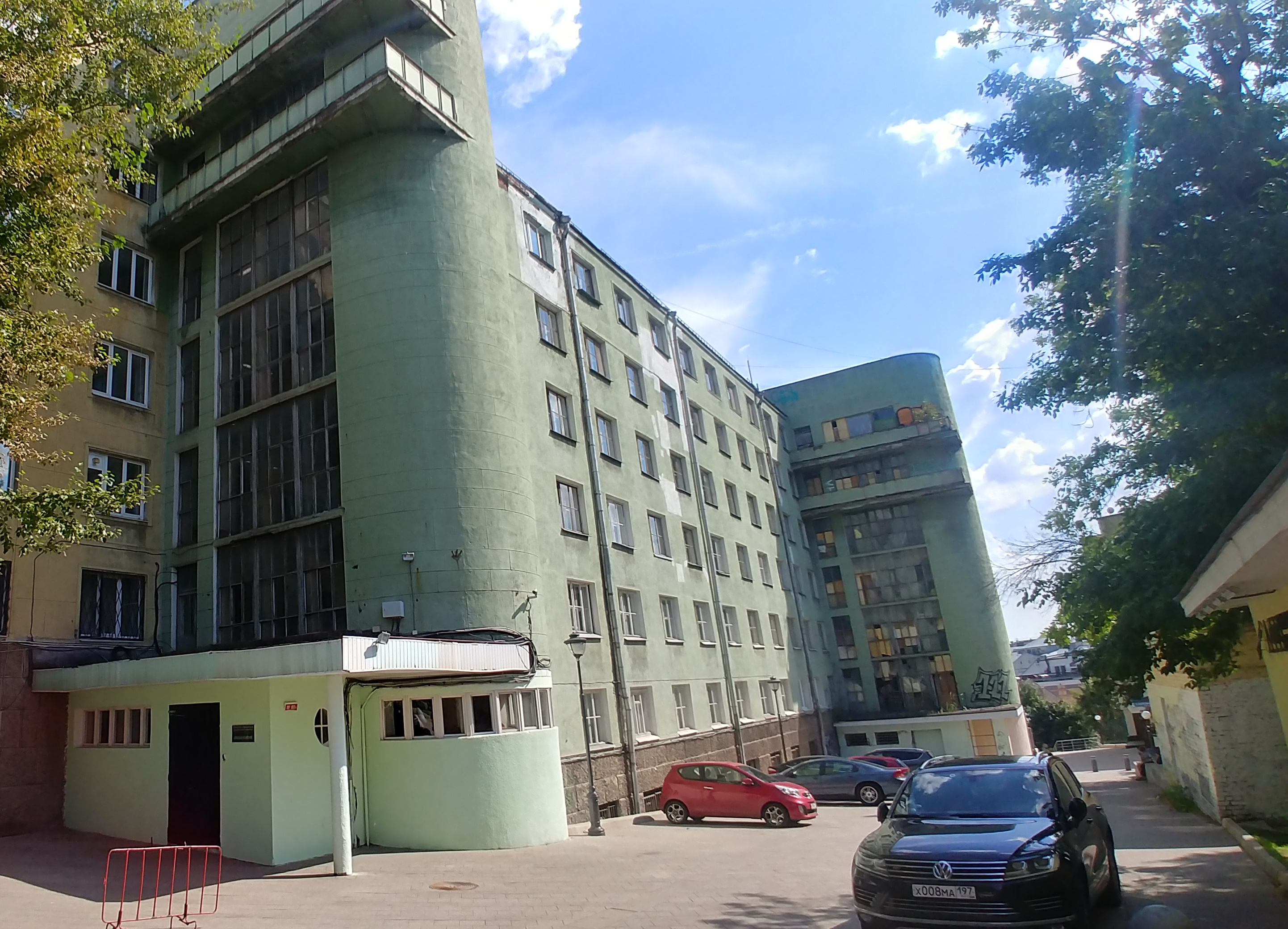
Photo of the former Marchlevski University in Moscow.

In The Great Game: The Story of the Red Orchestra, Leopold Trepper described four universities in Moscow which trained militants/students for espionage work in the 1920s to 1940s.

Marchlevski University, where I was enrolled, was reserved for national minorities, and contained almost twenty sections: Polish, German, Hungarian, Bulgarian, and so on. Specialized groups of militants, belonging to the national minorities of the particular country, were attached to each section. The third university was Kutv University, for students from the Near East, and finally, Sun Yat Sen University [of Moscow] was reserved for the Chinese…. The students at the communist university were also given military training: the handling of weapons, exercises in shooting and in civil defense, the rudiments of chemical warfare.

In addition, in the Russian Far East, there was the Chinese-Lenin School in Vladivostok with an enrollment of perhaps around 150-200 students per year (1933's enrollment was 207 students. After 1935–36, this number would decrease drastically).

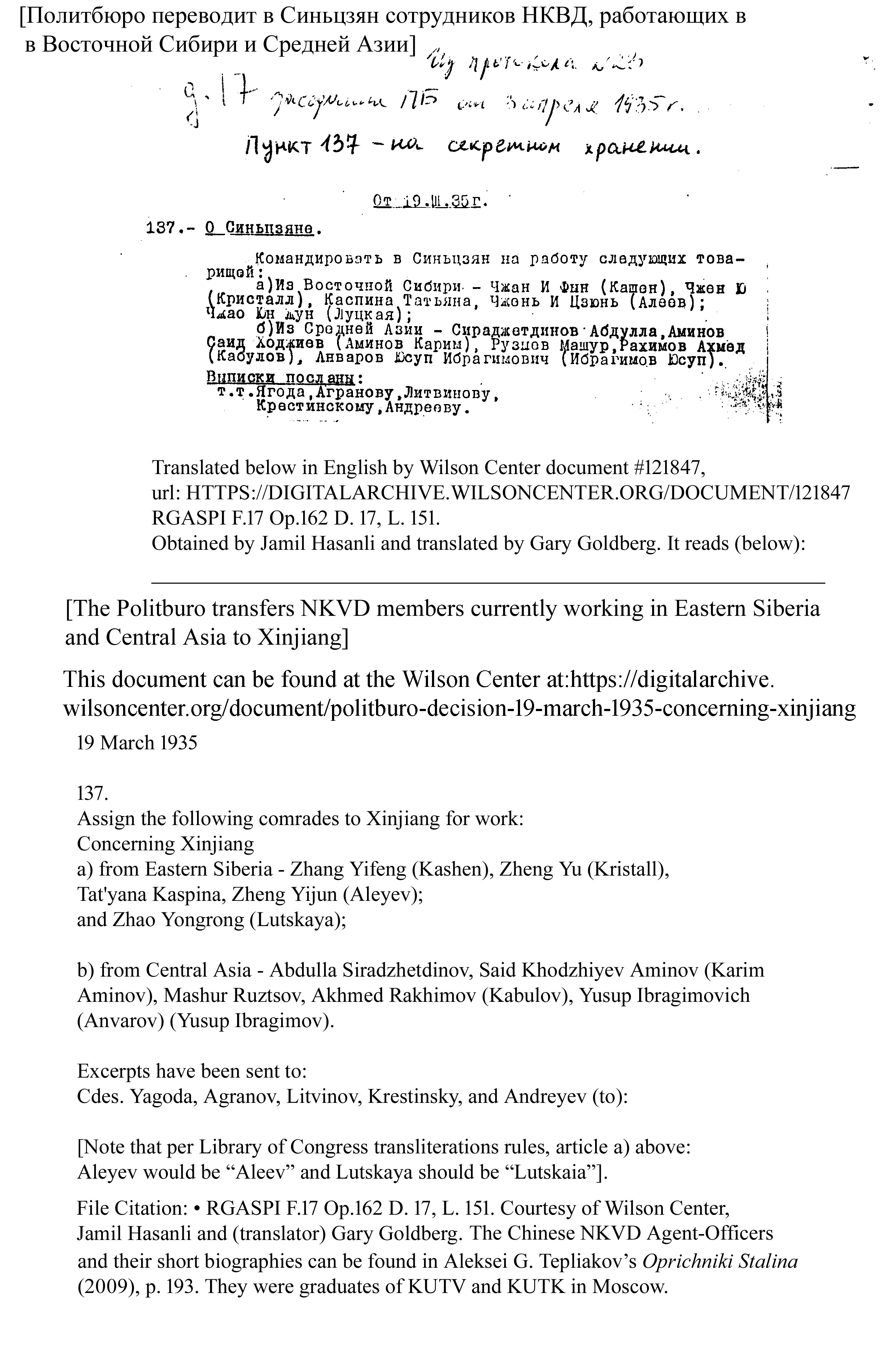
March 1935, Soviet Politburo transfers NKVD members working in Eastern Siberia and Central Asia to Xinjiang

In the document below-right from the RGASPI archives (f.17, op. 162, d. 17, l. 151) entitled "The Politburo transfer of NKVD members working in Eastern Siberia and Central Asia to Xinjiang," there are listed the names of four to five Chinese NKVD officers (from Kashen to Lutskaya, Tatyana Kaspina may or may not have been Chinese). Tepliakov's monograph Stalin's Guardsmen (Oprichniki Stalina) gives a short biography (education and work history) regarding three of these officers as well as five other Chinese NKVD or GRU agents (including Lenintsev). Oprichniki Stalina also reveals a bit more of how Chinese OGPU/NKVD agent-officers were recruited from KUTK (the Communist University of the Workers of China, also known by another name, the Sun Yat-sen University of Moscow- both use the acronym KUTK).

Most of the Chinese OGPU/NKVD and or GRU agents named by Tepliakov were born in China. Pyotr Vasilievich Grigorskii is the exception. He was born in 1905 near Nerchinsk, Russia at the Kazanovo mines. It is assumed that his father was a Chinese miner. The following names, Tulubaev, Tu xiang and Grigorskii are from an internet file made available by the academic, Tepliakov on the internet. The files is also called Stalin's Guardmen, but the three names do not appear in the hardback version of the book. The actual, physical book has been consulted to write this (Wikipedia) page of Maki Mirage along with the internet files. Ivan Gavrilovich Tulumbaev (born Li Fong Jiang in 1912) appears to have arrived in Russia at a very young age and to have begun working in the GRU while in his teens. His story has parallels with that of Ven Sian Liu. Tulumbaev and Tu Xiang served in the GRU. They along with Grigorskii did not appear to have finished their higher education (a diploma). But Grigorskii's file had very little information. Interestingly, Tu Xiang was assigned as an agent or political commissar at the Komsomol University in Kharbarovsk and CLS (Chinese-Lenin School) in Vladivostok. It's unclear if he was also a student/cadet while working. Ti Xiang, Tulumbaev and Grigorskii are from Tepliakov's files obtained via the internet. Why the Russian academic Tepliakov would give these files (a pdf book made available by Tepliakov via his internet homepage and the actual, hardbound book) all the same name is bewildering. It makes proper citation difficult.

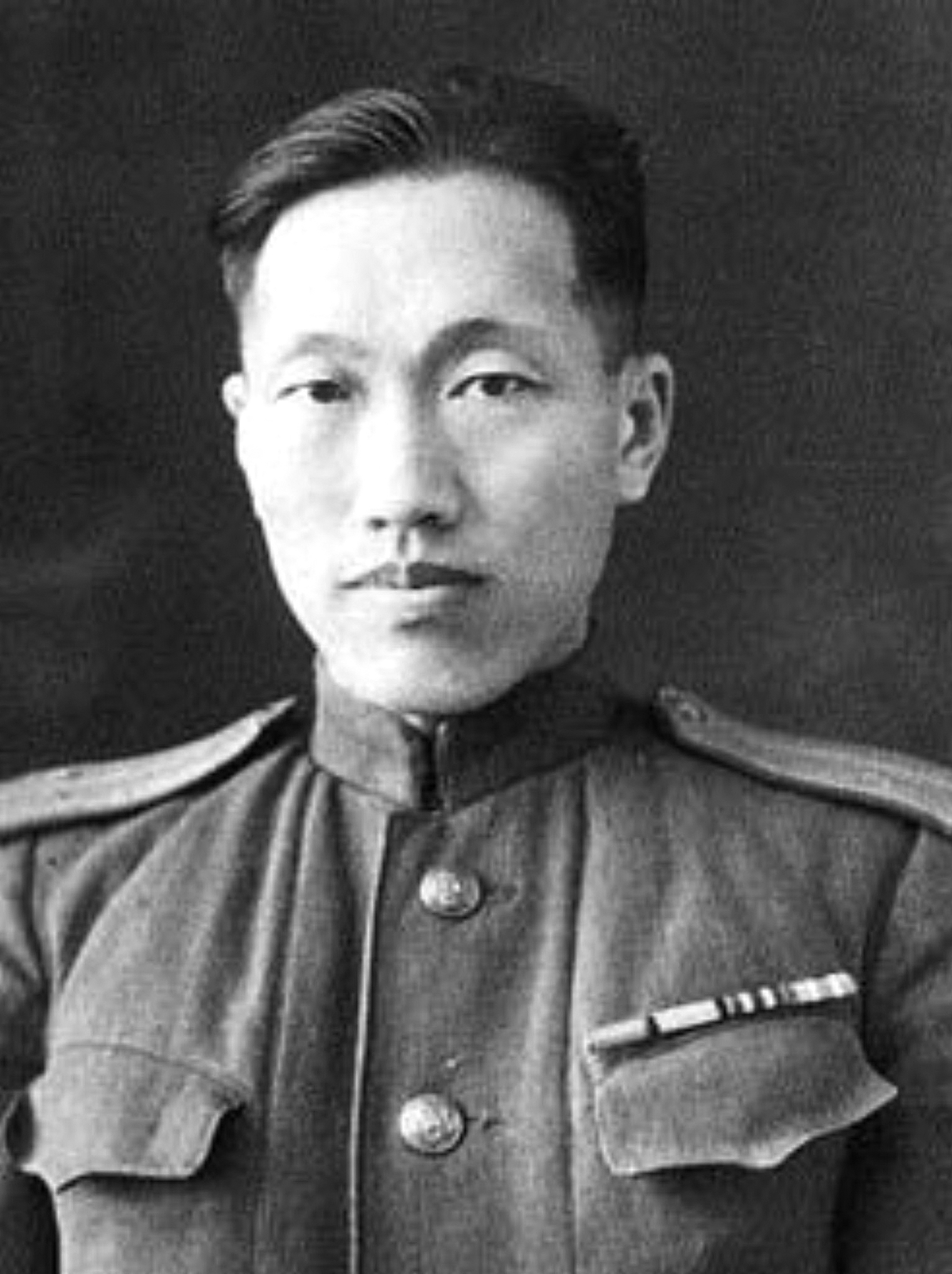
Lenintsev served in the INO, NKVD in Manchuria and China proper

Of the remaining five, Lenintsev, Aleev and Lutskaia studied at the KUTK (Communist University of the Workers of China) while Tszi Chzhi (this is per LOC transliteration) and Kristal (also spelled Kristall) studied at the KUTV. Leninstev (Khou Mintsi) was born in Shanxi Province in 1905 and arrived in Vladivostok (illegally) in 1926. He served as an infantryman, translator and in military intelligence during the Sino-Soviet War of 1929. According to his daughter, Lenintsev served on many secret missions and assignments for the USSR that he will never get credit for. In 1968, at the height of the tensions between China and USSR, Lenintsev was sacked from his job because of his nationality (that is, his ethnicity; he was a Soviet citizen). His daughter Nina said with a bit of dry wit and sarcasm "вот социализм."

Many of the ethnic Chinese, Soviet intelligence officers served the USSR in the 1920s to the 1940s and 1950s by teaching Chinese at various institutes and learning centers in the USSR when not employed in "special operations" abroad. All of the listed eight in Oprichniki Stalina served Soviet intelligence by participating in missions throughout China (all of the major cities and regions especially Shanghai and Beijing). One or two ran Communist cells in China. Others, when not sent abroad, appeared to have worked in industries and cities where Chinese laborers were abundant and where translators and commissars were needed such as in the Transbaikal region (near Chita and Irkutsk).

Perhaps, there remains an unfound treasure trove of information about the Chinese and Soviet Chinese who studied at KUTK (the Chinese Sun Yat-sen University in Moscow) and then served in operation Maki-Mirage (and Soviet intelligence). This university (by its namesake) would appear to have produced more Soviet intelligence officers of East Asian background than KUTV.

==== Evaluations of Imperial Japanese espionage ====
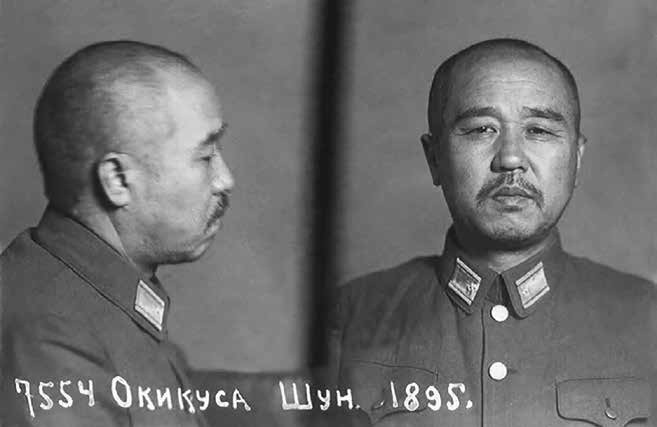
Shun Akikusa in Soviet captivity in 1945

After the conclusion of World War II, Major General Shun Akikusa, the leader of Japanese intelligence in Manchukuo, reported that of the twenty or so agents that the Japanese had trained, only three had ever reported back while on Russian soil (likely through signals intelligence). Unfortunately, the three did not send any intelligence information ever.

According to A.M. Nair, an Indian instructor at the Japanese intelligence school in Xinjing (Changchun), Manchuria, they trained some thirty Koreans who crossed over into the Russian Far East. None ever reported back. After 1945–46, some of the very same men that Nair trained were now working as Soviet cadres in North Korea. This leads to the conclusion that many if not most were simply Soviet double agents.

Further, there is an American intelligence report based on interrogations of Japanese intelligence officials and officers which was commissioned on Feb. 28, 1950 under the command of General Douglas MacArthur and entitled "Japanese Intelligence on Soviet Intentions near End of World War II." The report was composed from interrogations with several colleagues of Shun Akikusa including: Hiroshi Oshima (Berlin Military Attache), Michitake Yamaoka (Moscow Military Attache), the Private Secretary, Kanyei Chuyo (head of Japanese Naval Intelligence), Seizo Arisue (head of the Intelligence Bureau), and Masao Yoshizumi, lieutenant-general and head of Military Affairs Bureau. The report stated that the Japanese tried to recruit White Russians, Koreans and Manchurians but no reliable reports or information came as a result. Espionage was described as the "least valuable" component of Japanese state intelligence, and those few agents by which Japan did use to transfer information were White Russian emigres, although many of them were Soviet agents.

Author Aleksandr Kulanov wrote that the Japanese officers Michitaro Komatsubara, Hikosaburo Hata, and "the entire Russian department of the Japanese secret police fell victim to an enormous OGPU and military intelligence effort of disinformation, from the year 1937 onward."

Kuromiya and Pepłoński's research stated that, "By one Japanese estimate, only less than 5 percent of Japan's attempts at penetrating Soviet territory succeeded in the 1930s, whereas the success rate of the Soviet penetration of Manchurian territory was at least 65 percent." The scholars also cited another Japanese history by former counterintelligence officers which described Manchuria in 1937 as an atmosphere of "unprecedented international espionage."

==== Structure of Soviet espionage ====
Broadly, the Soviets sought to create a worldwide network of spies, and even internal counterintelligence often involved active and offensive rather than passive tactics. Soviet counterintelligence agencies performed active measures abroad, such as in Manchuria, China, and Korea during Maki Mirage. The Soviet Union spent much of its intelligence resources on forward operations rather than on nominal counter-intelligence. Soviet intelligence recruited agent-officers from among students, former soldiers, policemen (also former Red Guards) and Soviet cadres to join the GRU and the INO, NKVD. The main function of each group was to send agents abroad in intelligence missions. The INO refers to the "foreign division" of the Soviet political police (OGPU/NKVD). The GRU (military intelligence) used its operatives almost exclusively for operations overseas. The INO was renamed and restructured between different Soviet secret police and espionage agencies, as were the Soviet security agencies themselves.

=== Context of Maki Mirage ===
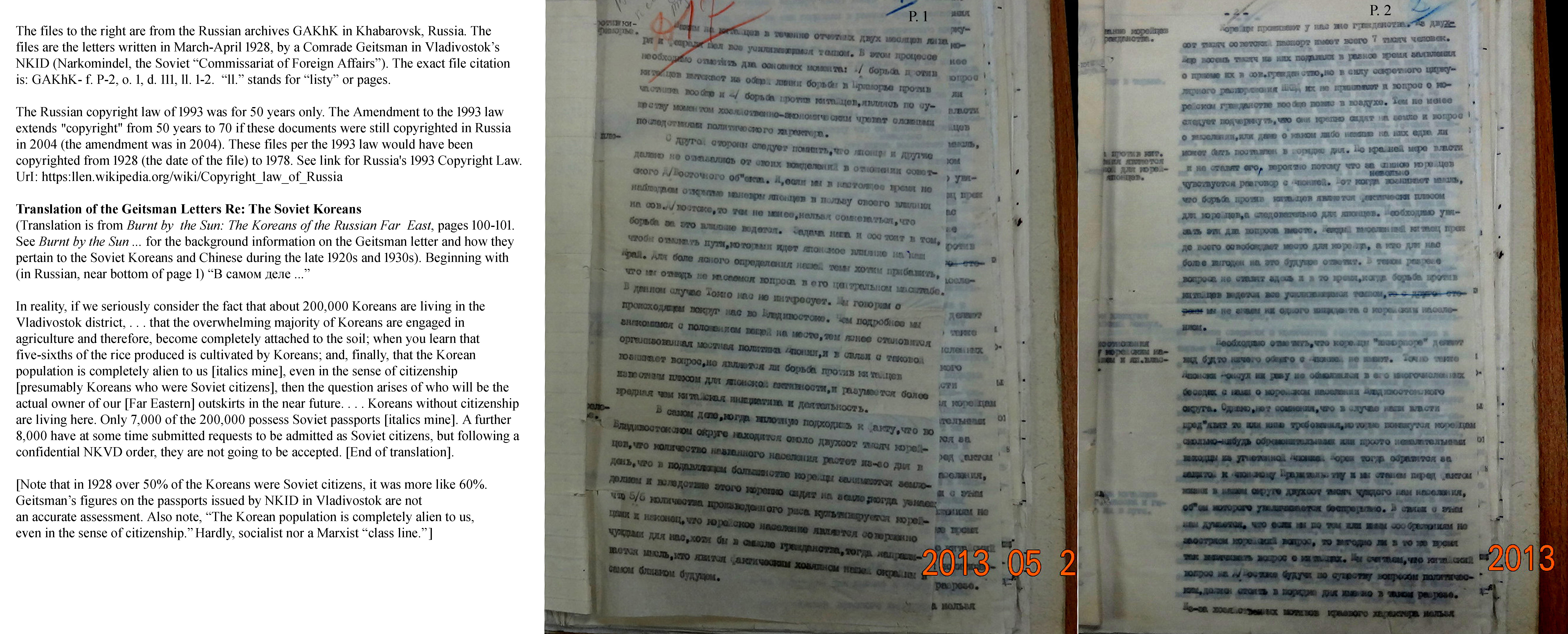
Geitsman Files from GAKhK Archives in Russia- "Koreans Alien to Us"

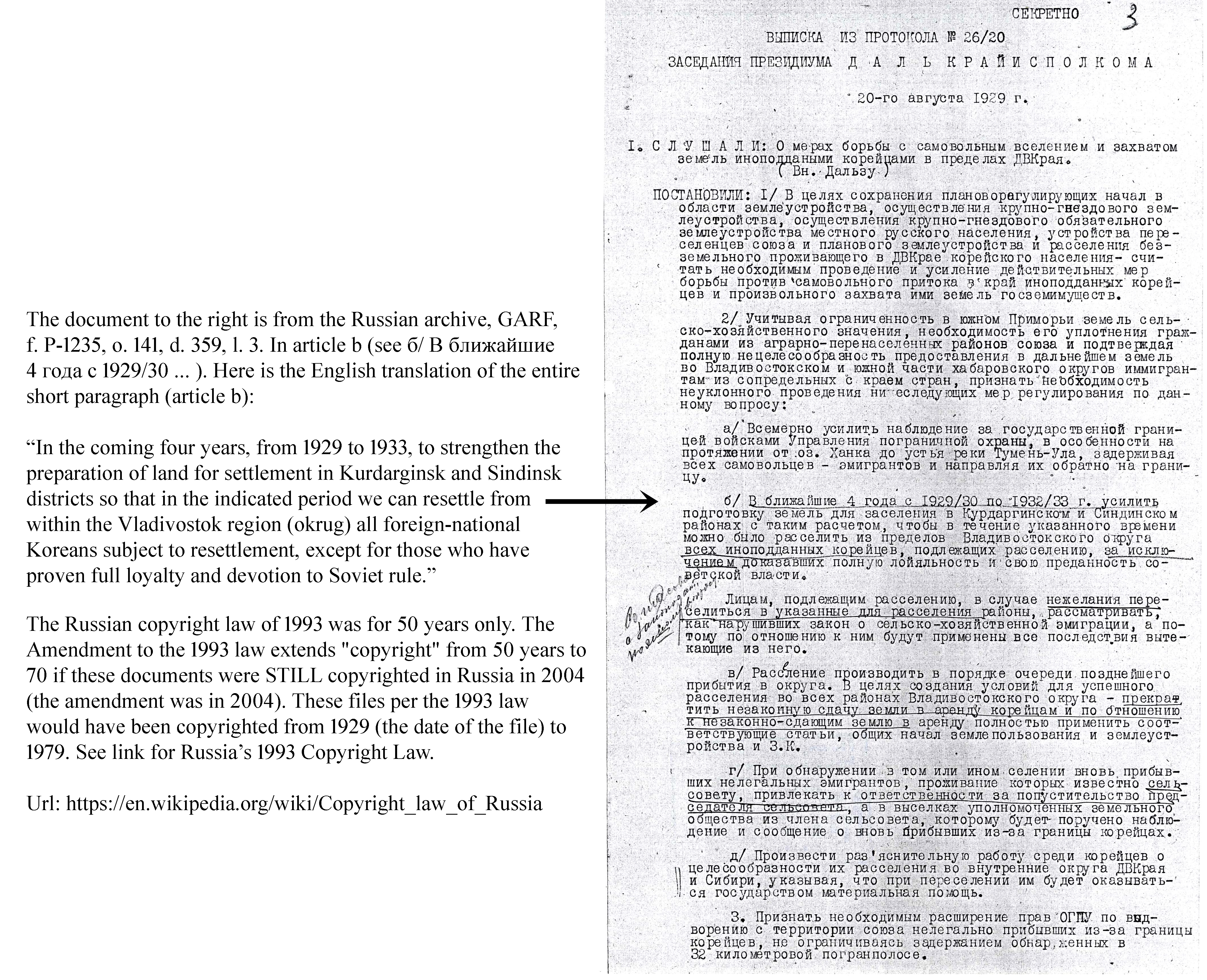
GARF archival file- Koreans to be deported except those showing "complete loyalty and devotion" to Soviet power/Soviet rule.

One major factor in the importance of the Operation Maki Mirage is that it opens up the door to research on other operations run by the INO, NKVD and the GRU using the other Soviet diaspora peoples – especially those using Soviet Germans and Poles overseas used in the large network of operation in the Red Orchestra and those using operatives to infiltrate and (a second variation) to represent themselves as the Polish Promethean Movement. The latter variant of INO, NKVD involved in the PMO was a false flag operation or served to lure anti-Soviet elements back to the USSR.

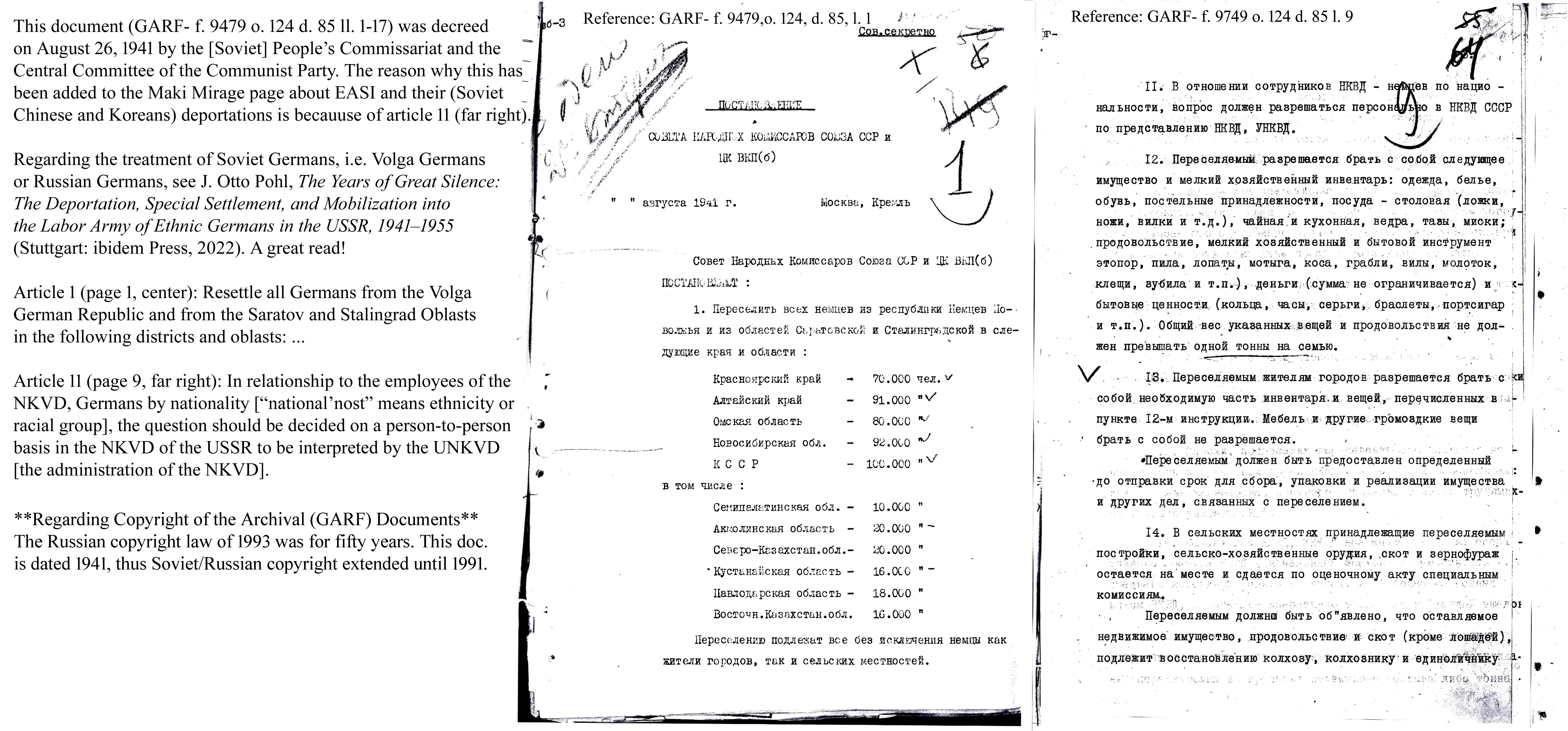
Volga German Deportation and Germans in the NKVD- see article 11

Additionally, because of the dearth of information, much of the depth revealed in Maki Mirage can provide new information on Soviet intelligence (and continuities) and their use of Soviet human resources. Referring to a previous point, it can be said that Maki Mirage was more complex tactically than Trust as there were two sets of agents at the ready. The decision of which one to employ depended on the daily, weekly or biweekly intel reports (thus, "tactical" decision-making).

However, in regards to HUMINT budgets, this is clearly an area where communist countries had a wide advantage over "market economy" countries, that is, capitalist countries. Communist budgets for intelligence did not take into account the proper "market value" for time, human resources, salaries, rent, and the use of buildings, land, houses, apartments, etc. since all of these assets either belonged to or were arbitrarily determined by the state. In this model, there is no consideration of whether the said "venture" brought back a loss or profit commensurable to its required investment. In Trust (Trest), we see agent-officers acting out different roles such as those belonging to "fake" Monarchist groups along with forged documents authenticating relationships to known anti Soviet elements. A deception operation like Trust may take a long period of time in order to "prepare the ground." The administrative staff for the OGPU/NKVD had to prepare many more materials to pad the legend, that is, the backstory. The agent-officers had to play different characters. Operationally, Operation Trust, was more complex (a combination of deception and false-flag operations) while Maki Mirage was tactically more complex.

The existence of Operation Maki Mirage exonerates the Soviet "smaller nations" and the diaspora peoples from the false charges of disloyalty that were deployed against them during Stalinism, along with charges of lack of assimilation of Soviet values, foreign ties and as being vectors for foreign agentura (agents). These charges are pronounced, falsified and repeated in the state archives of Russia/the former USSR and by many historians, anthropologists, political scientists and social scientists. Take for example, this quote from "The Origins of Soviet Ethnic Cleansing" which is originally from the GARF archives (f. P-1235, o. 141, d. 359, l. 3), "All Koreans without Soviet citizenship were to be resettled, 'except those having proved their complete loyalty and devotion to Soviet power.' " This statement was part of article B of an August 20, 1929 resolution passed by the Far Eastern Executive Committee. Officially, the Soviets had wanted to "resettle" ("deport" is perhaps more fitting) some 88,000 Koreans. This would have included thousands that were already Soviet citizens. The Geitsman letters, regarded even those Koreans with Soviet citizenship as "aliens", are also indicative of the views towards the Soviet Chinese and Koreans, and how strong the view to "deport" them was, even as early as the 1920s.

The hypothesis of "Soviet xenophobia", which claims that Soviet deportations and ethnic cleansing were motivated by security or Marxist ideology rather than national chauvinism (that is, racism) is refuted by the service of the deported nationalities to the Soviet Union. "Complete loyalty and devotion" [in order to not be deported, see the archival document above] was shown by Soviet diaspora peoples in the Red Army, those who served in the OGPU-NKVD, GRU and those who served in the gargantuan "informant" networks in Soviet civil society. These networks were estimated to have from 22 to 40 million participants during WWII. It cannot be more clear that the Soviets had clear racial biases towards non-Eastern Slav, diaspora peoples in undertaking the "nationalities" deportations.

One should understand that "national chauvinism" in Russian means the same as racial or ethnic prejudice in English. The words nation (natsiia) and nationality (national'nost) in Russian refer to an ethnic or racial people.

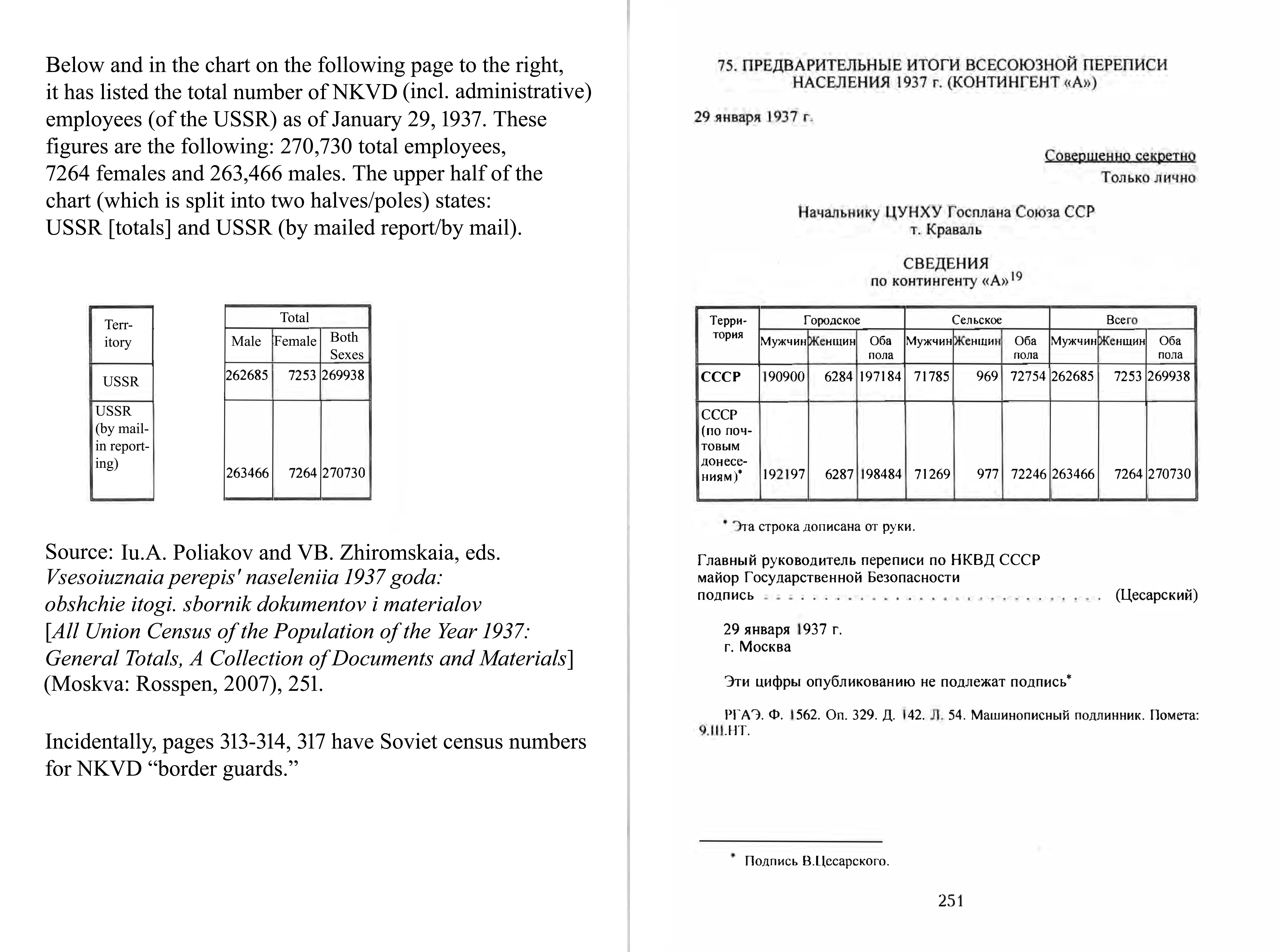
In the chart above (the photo of the Soviet archival document) it is listed the total number of NKVD (incl. administrative) employees (of the USSR) as of January 29, 1937. These figures are the following: 270,730 total employees, 7264 females and 263,466 males.

In his memoirs, Soviet spy Pavel Sudoplatov stated that in 1942, the INO, NKVD had a force of twenty-thousand including administrative staff using Americans, Chinese, Vietnamese, Poles, Romanians, Czechs, Spaniards and many other nationalities (such as the ones listed by Trepper). It consisted of sixteen sections, two of which conducted operations in China and the "far east." There remained fourteen other sections of the INO, NKVD and probably eighteen thousand other agent-officers and administrative staff. Incidentally, the 1937 All-Soviet census reported 270,730 total employees for the NKVD. This number includes agents-officers, executive branch and administrative staff. With all of these numbers in mind, one can understand that 20,000 in the INO, NKVD was no exaggeration. As a matter of fact, by the end of WWII, the INO, NKVD was probably even larger (certainly the NKVD grew from 1937 to 1945).

These agents were also used overseas most probably in Europe, Scandinavia and the Mediterranean including Turkey (Soviet Poles, Germans, Greeks, Finns and Turks—whether Oghuz or Chagatai speakers. It is quite easy for Chagatai speakers to learn, adapt and then speak Oghuz Turkish of Turkey). There is little evidence of this because Russian and Soviet historians (other than the one cited on this page) did not go into these Soviet minority communities to collect photos, interviews and histories. A large majority of researchers and academics (whether Western or Russian) prefer and continue to use exclusively the Soviet archives despite also calling the former USSR "the first propaganda state," and [paraphrasing two historians, Weiner and Holquist] "a totalitarian state where various social, cultural and political thoughts and identities were 'gardened' and 'sculpted' to meet state ideals." Surely these same academicians must have understood that the state archives exist to control history because as they have stated the USSR was a totalitarian state. It was not only a totalitarian state, but rather one which controlled information so tightly that its secret police (OGPU/NKVD) admitted and bragged that "Information [collection and dissemination] is the alpha and omega of our work." Many of the great leaders, Politburo leaders, Central Committee members and regional leaders purged the Soviet archives of their involvement in nefarious, tragic and especially repressive purges of Party members and common workers (Party and non-Party members). For these reasons, the interviews below are absolutely invaluable and rare as they were conducted within the former USSR and not among emigres.

The remaining 18,000 operatives in the INO, NKVD and GRU were being paid extremely well (less so the GRU agents- military intelligence) and their families were given nomenklatura privileges. The salaries, privileges (nomenklatura shops, schools, hospitals, etc.) and special apartments cost the Soviet state an "arm and a leg" and thus, it would have logically demanded that their agents put their lives on the line in "special operations." Sudoplatov also mentioned Poles, Ukrainians, and Germans being recruited as agents by the Soviets during the Molotov-Ribbentrop Pact negotiations, proclaiming to be refugees from communism.

The various set of operations carried out by Operation Maki Mirage from approximately 1920 to 1945 were only a fraction of Soviet intelligence operations carried out overseas using Soviet operatives. Surprisingly, in spite of the Great Terror (and the fear of "foreign nationalities and their influences"), Soviet minorities were utilized heavily in these operations. Despite the nationalities deportations, these operations, planned and led by the INO, NKVD (4th directorate, foreign department of the secret police) and the GRU employed all or almost all of the Soviet diaspora peoples. They recruited Soviet Greeks, Poles, Germans, Chinese, Koreans, speakers of the Oghuz Turkic languages (Tatars, Azerbaijanis, Pontic Greeks, Meskhetian Turks) and others sending them to nations, regions and communities where their co-ethnics (except in the case of the Turks) resided and their titular languages were spoken.

The operations run by the INO, NKVD refute the Soviet claim and that of its supporters that some could not be remade as loyal Soviet citizens or that they had not shown absolute loyalty to Soviet power. In the case of Maki Mirage, large numbers of foreign Chinese students and the Soviet Chinese and Koreans volunteered for these operations despite the deportation of their communities.

It should be pointed out that the Soviet Chinese or Chinese communities in the former USSR faced many difficulties and barriers to their inclusion into Soviet society. First, their communities were overwhelming male (a ratio typically of 97 Chinese males to 3 females per 100). Perhaps, some problems were due to language barriers. However, other factors were due to culture and ethnic differences (including different cultural practices, norms, ways communicating and acting). These would prove much harder to remedy or overcome.

=== Archive openings and historical methodology ===
The historiography and intelligence collected on the Chinese-Lenin School were secret until 2012. Archives and other research and depictions of Operation Maki Mirage were published by the Russian Federation from 2000 to 2014

Between 2006 and 2018, the American historian Chang interviewed former Soviet Chinese and Korean families in the Russian Far East, Uzbekistan, Kyrgyzstan and Ukraine. He came across seven families of former Soviet GRU and NKVD agent officers and recorded the interviews with six of the seven families on video or mp3, scanning family pictures and taking pictures of the interviewees. He sought to gather evidence that did not rely exclusively on Soviet-era archives, which had marginalized national minorities and had written them out of history.

In 2012, China's Ambassador to Russia, Li Hui commissioned the writing of The Chinese Diaspora in Vladivostok to be a monograph written in Russian and Chinese with a special chapter on the Chinese-Lenin School of Vladivostok. This chapter by necessity would utilize files from Russia's off-limits archives (requiring permission by the FSB for select researchers, intelligence agents and the like) since the CLS was a school for espionage operatives (as well as a university). One wonders, "Why was China interested in the Chinese-Lenin School?" The backstory is that during the 1937-38 Chinese deportation, most of the Soviet Chinese and Chinese students abroad in the USSR were deported to China including many former INO, NKVD and GRU agents. Most were arrested upon their return to China and or later tracked down and arrested by KMT intelligence. Some of the former Soviet operatives were forced to sign long confessions and later, were turned into double agents against the CCP (which the CCP re-turned). KMT intelligence was completely infiltrated by CCP intelligence operatives such as Kang Sheng, Li Kenong, Chen Geng and Zhou En-Lai. Thus, China knew about these operations for quite some time.

Returning to the commissioning of the monograph, the PRC diplomats and their Russian counterparts helped to select the authors, Dmitrii Ancha and Nelli G. Miz. Additionally with diplomatic help, the Russian Federation temporarily opened the previously "off-limits" NKVD/KGB/FSB archival documents, which allowed the authors to pen one chapter on the Chinese-Lenin School of Vladivostok and its activities specifically that of training and providing agents for Operation Maki Mirage. This chapter and its materials (written by Ancha and Miz, but requested by Li Hui and the PRC) contain no footnotes or citations unlike the others in The Chinese Diaspora in Vladivostok. Some of the files on the Chinese-Lenin School are available while others are off-limits according to Dmitrii Ancha. In 2015, Ancha and Miz produced a 2nd edition of Chinese Diaspora in Vladivostok in Russian.

Post-Soviet Russian documentary films and articles on Operation Maki Mirage are historically problematic because they lack mention of the hundreds of East Asian agents from 1920 to 1945, focusing mainly on "European" or "Russian" agents, despite the feats of loyalty and bravery demonstrated by the East Asian officers and key role of linguistic and cultural awareness in the espionage activities.

Ancha and Miz's research based on the Soviet archives found that at least 180 out of 400 students of the Chinese-Lenin School were purged as "suspect nationalities" during the Great Terror (1936–39). The number of Chinese students trained in espionage at the CLS, KUTV (Communist University of the Toilers of the East) and the Moscow Sun Yat-sen University was terminated during the Great Terror. As the Korean deportation was ending (Dec. 1937), Stalin concurrently launched the Chinese deportation of 1937-38 (which contained three waves of deportations). The three waves were Dec. 1937 and Feb. and March–April 1938. A certain author has interviewed Soviet Chinese on their deportation. Some were kept in Almaty and Tashkent until as late as 1948 and then deported to Xinjiang, China. The Soviets kept at least 4,000 of their "Soviet Chinese" deported from the Russian Far East in Almaty to use for translating military and diplomatic cables, intelligence work and to use as translators for Soviet publishing houses (a "masterskaia" is one word to call "small publishing houses" employing from three to six people). Lenintsev (the former INO, OGPU-NKVD agent) worked in exactly this field after WWII until 1968 (see photo at the beginning of the article).

=== Korenizatsiia (Soviet indigenization) and the construction of the Chinese-Lenin School ===
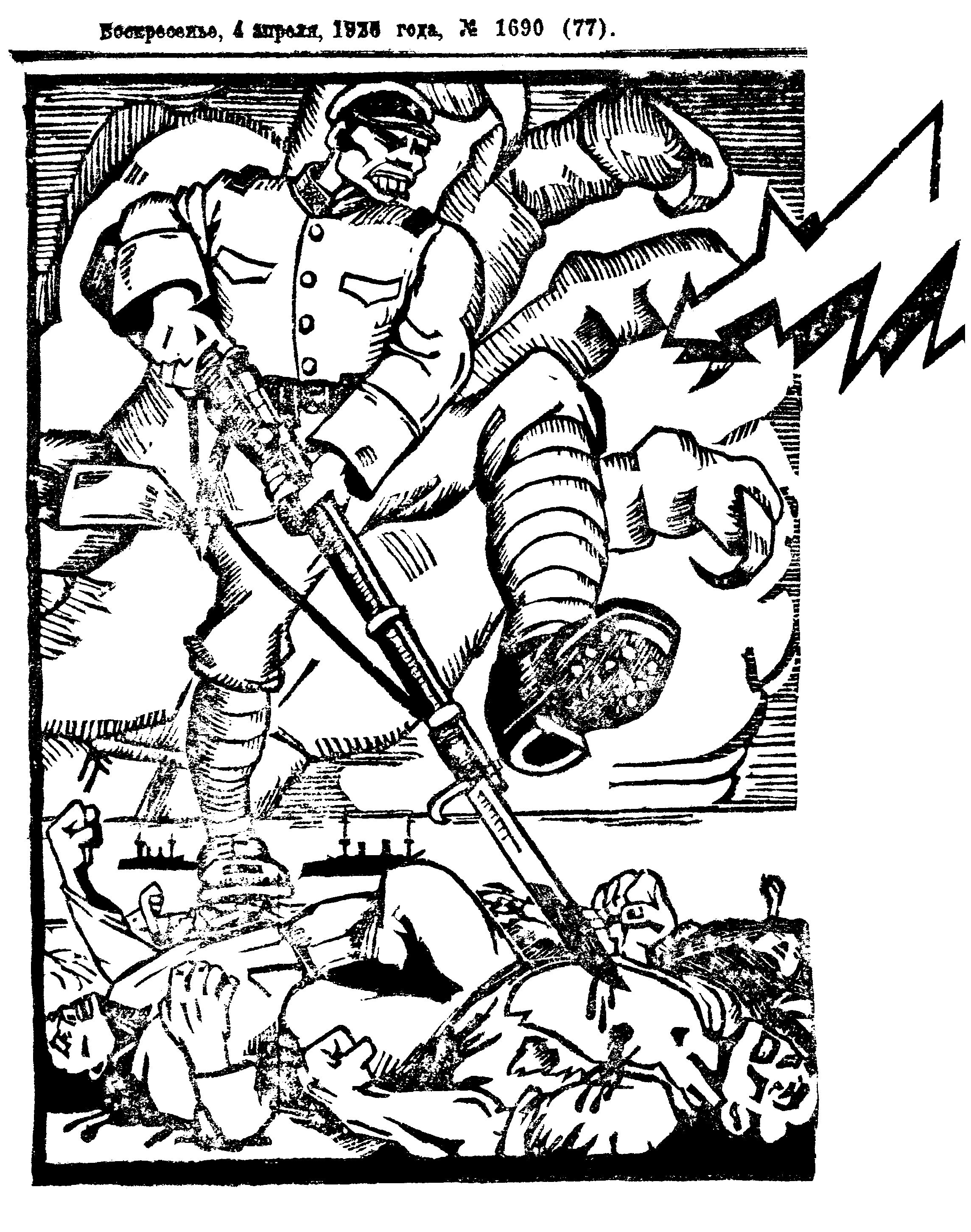
Soviet propaganda of an impending invasion by Japan of the Soviet Far East

Beginning in the 1920s, the Bolsheviks began to construct, consolidate and educate the Chinese and Koreans of the Russian Far East as "Soviet peoples." One major reason was the growing market influence of the Japanese Empire and the Bolsheviks reliance on Japan for hard currency in exchange for resources such as timber, natural gas, minerals and petroleum from the Russian Far East, and especially Sakhalin. Japan already controlled Korea and was setting up various military and political alliances as well as business ventures in Manchuria. Both countries were business partners, political rivals for the other country's leaders, neighbors and military rivals contesting the same geographies.

On October 29, 1923, the Primorskii provincial Communist Party voted to begin investment in large scale infrastructure construction (schools, universities, radio stations, publishing houses and roads) in the Russian Far East to support their political, educational and occupational campaigns for the Chinese and Koreans there. This was called korenizatsiia (indigenization), a sort of "Sovietization" program which would assimilate and integrate national minorities into the institutions of the socialist state through ideological campaigns at work, school and through radio and newspapers. This socio-political policy and movement took place from 1923 to 1934. The Bolsheviks wanted to organize the "construction" of the Chinese and Koreans of the RFE as Soviet peoples while increasing their educational networks (school systems), the number of "socialist" books, pamphlets and other materials printed and their recruitment numbers of East Asians into Party institutions (as cadres) and as labor union members. The USSR would guard their borders with both military might and ideology (Soviet socialism).

There were immediate benefits for the Koreans and Chinese because most Asians were laborers. The "red corners" throughout the USSR would teach the foreign laborers the rudiments of speaking, writing and reading Russian while providing breaks (while on the job) and reading materials. Some large factories even had rabfaks which were small schools/classrooms in the factory or workplace where workers could study from one to three hours a day.

On June 4, 1925, the Chinese section of the Primorskii Provincial Soviet Party School was formed. On March 1, 1933, this entity formally became the Chinese Lenin School in Vladivostok (CLS). Initially, there were 207 students. The students were separated into those studying at the preparatory stage, middle stage (secondary education) and higher education (university level). In the first year of the CLS, there were only 43 students studying at the university level.

=== Learning "tradecraft" and preparation for Operation Maki Mirage ===
The Chinese-Lenin School was established with three main directives/goals: one, the teaching and educating future Chinese and Korean comrades/socialists, two, the creation of a publishing house for the translation of socialist literature in the Chinese language and three, the establishment of a recruitment and training center for East Asian (Koreans and Chinese) agents of Soviet intelligence. The OGPU/NKVD also included a subdivision, the INO (the Foreign Division of the Soviet political police) and the acronym GRU (Soviet military intelligence) also included one subdivision, the RO, OKDVA among others. RO signified "the Intelligence Division" and OKDVA meant "the Special Banner Far Eastern Army."

All of these affiliated agent-officers participated in Operation Maki Mirage. Some students at the CLS who were referred to as "cadets", had been recruited from the Soviet intelligence organs. The cadets who were recruited from the GRU and OGPU/NKVD also monitored the students and the everyday life of the university (reactions to various courses, discussions, political thought among various groups at the university, who had influence and why). The CLS served to train qualified intelligence officers to work behind the "cordon" (behind Soviet borders) on the territory of the Japanese puppet state of Manchukuo. The staff of the school was selected not only from Chinese and Russians who had Soviet citizenship as well as Chinese citizens and those who arrived from illegally from Manchukuo. Most students were Chinese from China as well as some who were from the USSR. Regarding the composition of Koreans, most of the Koreans at the CLS were ex-military and former NKVD officers.

Those who were selected to become intelligence agents, that is, the cadets, were given false names to study under. In addition to a general training regime, Comrade Usenko taught the student cadets how to shoot a gun on the run and shooting on a target range. The cadets practiced their "tradecraft" two to three times a month visiting safe houses in which they had to pass certain tests working with various types of equipment. There are some parallels with the Nakano school and the evolution of intelligence tradecraft in the 1930s. Both schools wanted well-rounded, well-educated recruits. The students learned all the basics of Soviet spycraft, including intelligence, counter-intelligence, guerrilla warfare, radio communication, and techniques in spycraft/espionage. They were also directed to keep in excellent physical condition. Comrades Mastis and Zybalov gave the cadets lessons in weightlifting and boxing. They were supervised by the Primorsky regional administration of the NKVD secret police.

Over twelve hundred agents participated in Maki Mirage. Of these, about four hundred agents were recruited from Vladivostok's Chinese-Lenin School from 1924 to Spring 1938, of which at least one-hundred eighty were repressed in the Great Terror through 1939. Approximately three-hundred agents were Koreans or Chinese from KUTV (Communist University of Toilers in the East in Moscow), and three-hundred Koreans or Chinese from KUTK (Moscow Sun Yat Sen University). Approximately two-hundred agents were not trained for "missions" at a Soviet university, but were Koreans and Chinese from the Red Army, Soviet enterprises, teachers and cadres at Soviet institutions. Additionally, some of the cadets at the Soviet espionage universities were not all students themselves but were veterans of the RO, OKDVA (Special Red Banner Far Eastern Army) and INO (Foreign intelligence).

=== Soviet operational and tactical espionage ===
In the first half of the 1930s, there were periodic cessations of the use of East Asian agents as Japanese penetration was suspected and all East Asian agents would be suspended, despite a lack of evidence for any threat or any major extension of Japanese intelligence into Soviet territory, the Soviets were suspicious of diaspora nationalities. The NKVD purportedly exposed "brotherhoods" and "regional land-based brotherhoods" of "Japanese spies" among Chinese students as an excuse to perpetrate the mid-1930s purge.

All "cadets" had to be ready at a moment's notice for training or work to be sent to Manchuria on a training mission whether simply reconnaissance or to perform acts of sabotage. Ancha and Miz's Chinese Diaspora gives profiles of cadets-turned-students who enrolled at the Chinese-Lenin School (CLS) in the mid-1930s. They are emblematic of what Soviet intelligence wanted in their officers, first-hand knowledge of Manchuria.

Vei Lianshan (born Ui Lianshan) worked in intelligence for the OKDVA. He was involved in leading an underground anti-Japanese movement in Manchuria. His group and work was uncovered in 1934. In that year, Vei Lianshan crossed the border from Sakhalien (now Heihe, China) to Blagoveshchensk and was reassigned to study at the CLS in 1936.

The second cadet was Van Vychin. It appears that he was a GRU agent who was sent to Manchuria fighting in an anti-Japanese partisan unit. He would repeatedly pass information to Soviet intelligence about the Japanese army. In 1936, he enrolled in the Chinese-Lenin School but was arrested and repressed in 1938 during the Great Terror.

Fan Shohua (real name is Wang Juntou) was born in 1912 and served as an intelligence agent in the RO, OKDVA. As part of his work, he repeatedly crossed the Soviet-Manchurian border. In late 1936, he returned illegally from Sakhalien [Heihe], China to the USSR. Beginning in early 1937, he was enrolled at the Chinese-Lenin School.

In Operation Maki Mirage the Soviets in Manchuria would treat their operations like they were nearly on their own home soil. They recruited many agents who had some knowledge of Manchuria having served there during the 1929 Sino-Soviet War and many who stayed there afterwards leading various Soviet NRA (Soviet partisan grounds on Manchuria soil). They would use tactics much like that of guerrilla warfare employing multiple levels of deception to distract the enemy at the border.

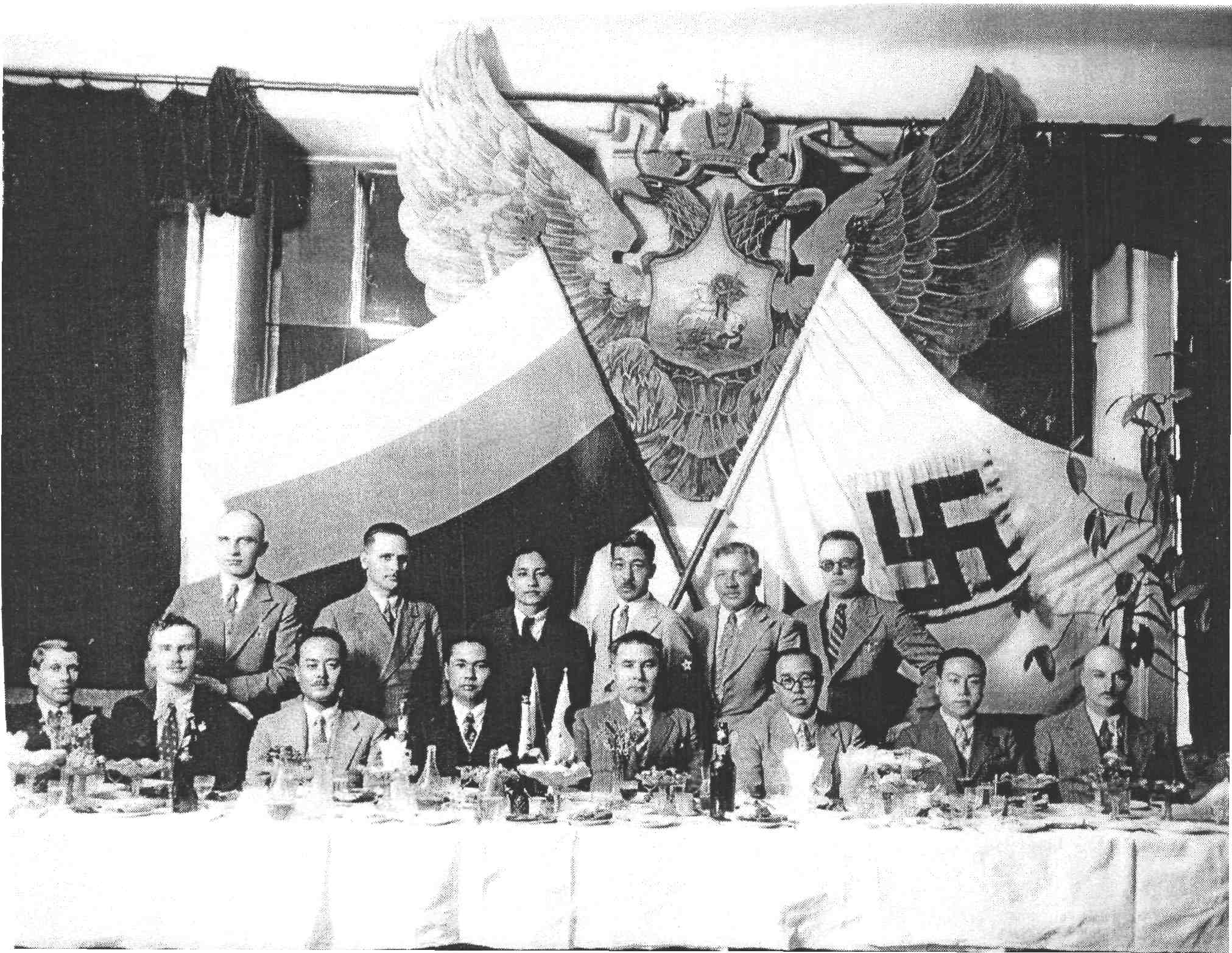
Shun Akikusa at a Russian Fascist Party conference in December 1934, Manchuria/Manchukuo

In other areas, they would carry out acts of diversion or simply allow themselves to be caught (being arrested with false papers, and other kinds of actions attracting the attention of authorities) while allowing those who were sent to carry out the "special tasks," a much higher chance of succeeding and escaping. ("Special tasks" refers to the hard, punitive or murderous actions carried out by OGPU/NKVD agents). But the Japanese, Chinese and Tsarist Whites (including sub-groups of Monarchists, Russian Fascists, etc.) in Manchuria had very little knowledge about one hidden layer of operational deception and that was the employment of hundreds of East Asian agents in Soviet intelligence, while conspicuous Russian agents were the center of focus for anti-Soviet intelligence such as by the Japanese.

The historian Hiroaki Kuromiya sums up the information Akikusa gave to his captors (Akikusa also died in Soviet captivity). Kuromiya also called Maki Mirage and Dreamers "deception" operations (typically to hide one's own "forward" operations). Case studies of specific Soviet agents can show the general outline of what the Soviets were doing at this time.

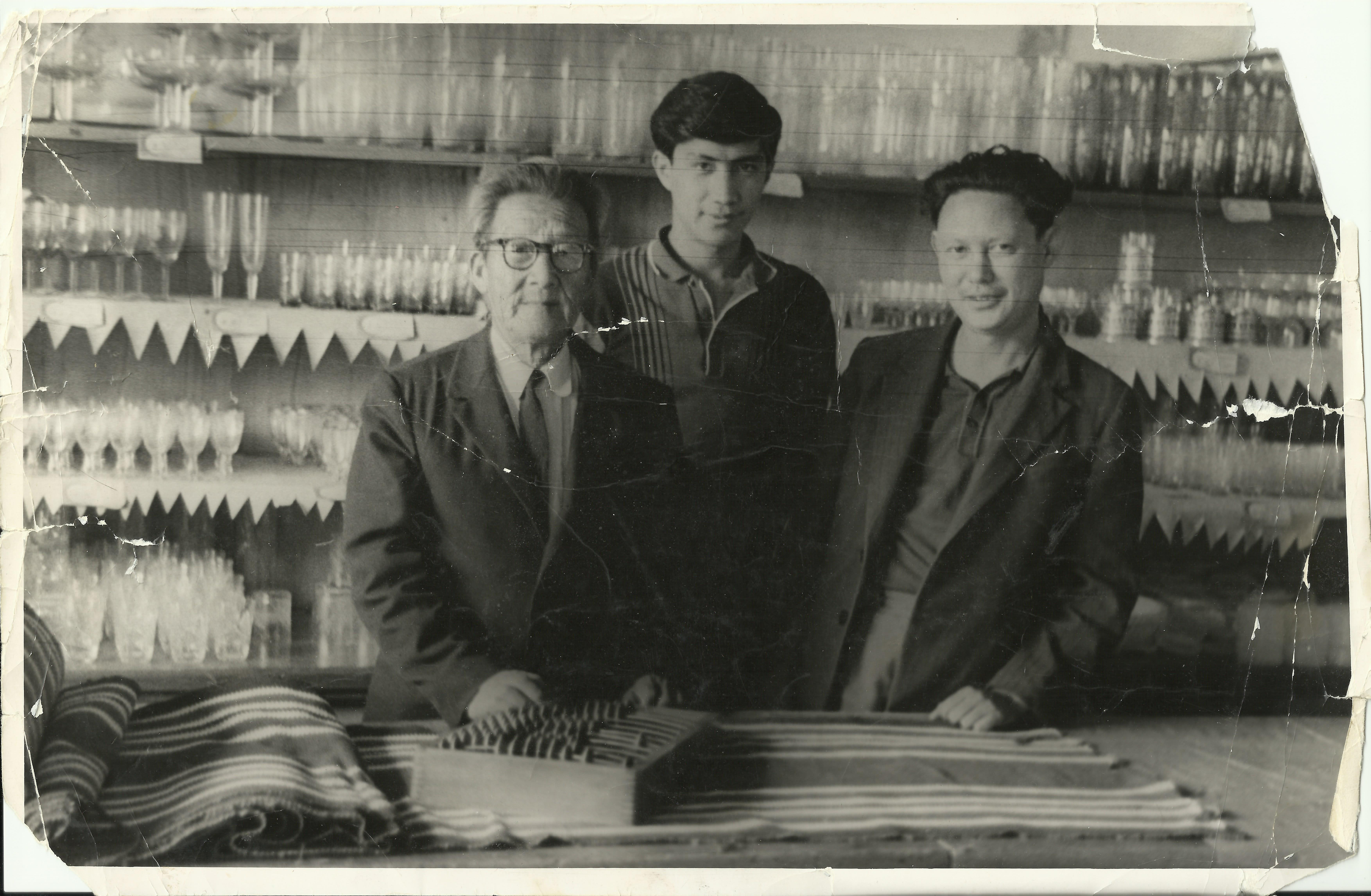
Ven Sian Liu (left) at his Soviet trade store, Bukhara, Uzbekistan 1970. Liu was born in 1904 and was a former Soviet GRU agent who served in the Chinese detachment of the "Red Cavalry" under Semyon Budyonny

Ven Sian Liu was born in 1904 to a rural family from China, and his parents had died en route to Vladivostok. At the age of nine taken in by the Popov family, both doctors, Ven Sian joined the Red Army immediately after the October Revolution at the age of 14. Fighting in Europe during the Russian Civil War, Ven Sian was eventually transferred to the GRU, military intelligence. He worked in surveillance over "immigrants" the contemporary term by the Soviet state for Chinese and Korean residents of the Soviet Far East, most born in the USSR. Following this, Ven Sian participated in the undeclared "war against the Japanese", covert operations in Manchuria that occurred in the 1930s before WWII. In 1937, he engaged in two GRU operations in Manchuria, but returned home and found out that his Korean wife and her son had been deported to Uzbekistan. His Korean wife's son died soon after the deportation to Kazakhstan. His wife blamed Ven Sian for her son's death and this ended their marriage. Despite this, Ven Sian Liu continued to work for the Soviet police MVD as an indirect employee of the state. Later he fought in WWII in the defense against Germany and performed reconnaissance. After the war, he ran a store in Bukhara.

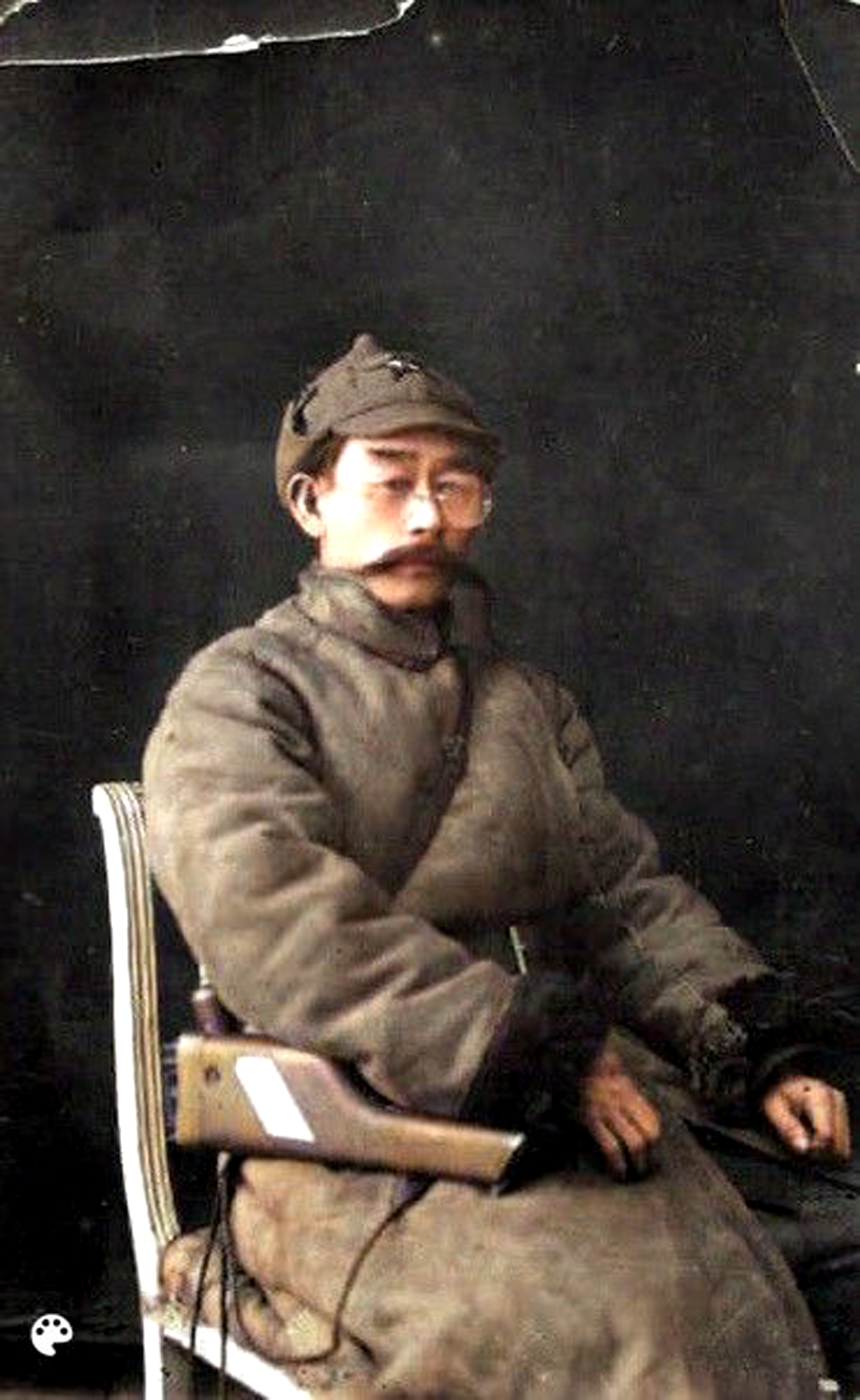
Van In Zun, head of the Chinese OGPU/NKVD regiments

The list of participants in the Maki Mirage documentary Agent Prizrak (Ghost Agent) listed only two East Asian NKVD officers, Khan Chan Ger and Van In Zun. Yet, because of the Soviet deportations of the Chinese and the Koreans and the photos obtained (which are present on this page), we know that there were NKVD regiments made up of only Chinese and Koreans respectively. Thus, the listing of the regimental leaders Khan and Van hints at a much larger recruitment, participation and roles played by the Soviet Chinese and Koreans in Maki Mirage. The pictures above from Blagoveshchensk are indicative of the missions (3 Koreans in one photo and 3 Chinese in another). They are on the Chinese border in Blagoveshchensk, Russia to begin their operations (and not for sightseeing). Official photos at the OGPU/NKVD photo studio were taken because they were to embark on the said missions.

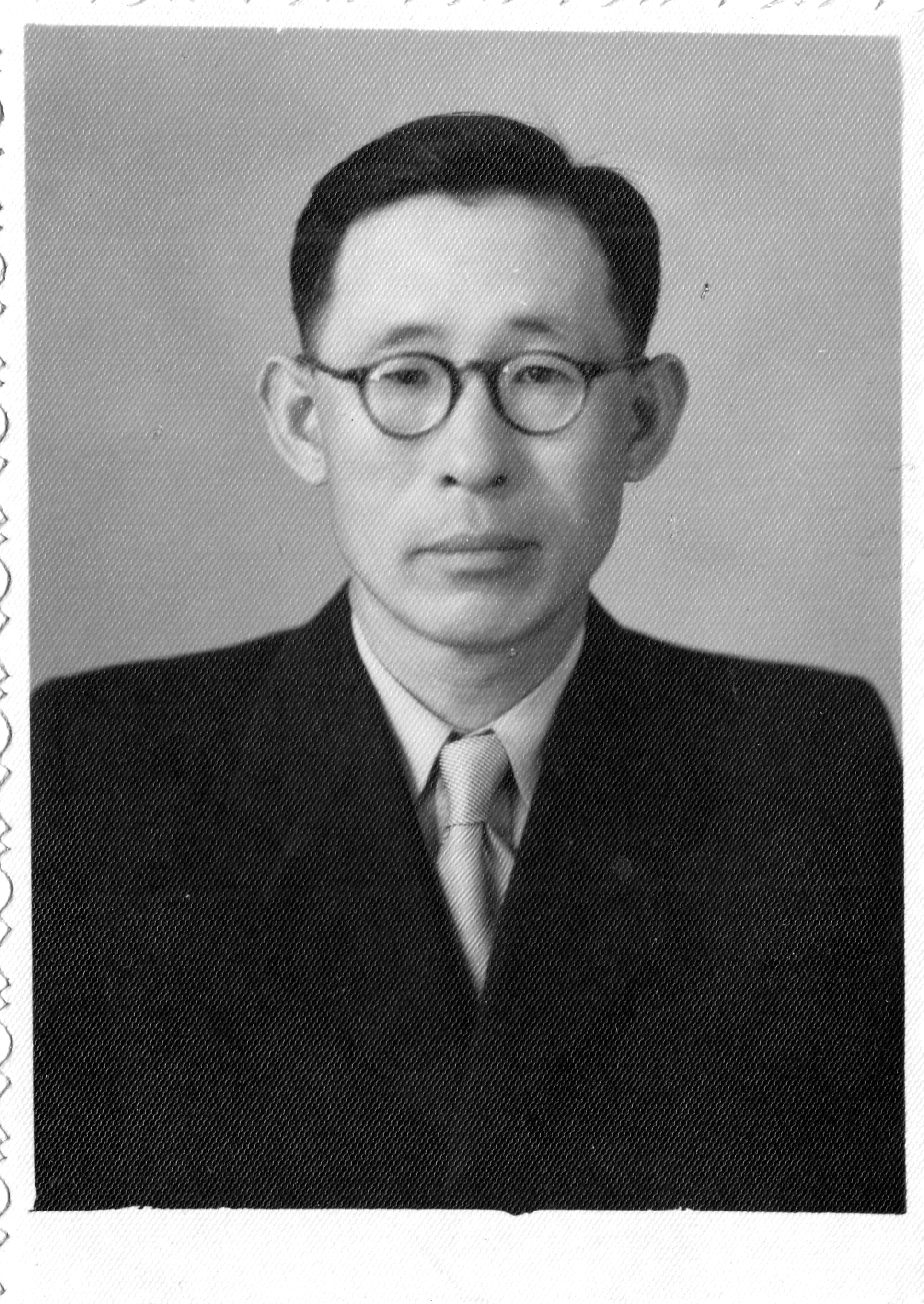
From 1942 to 1944, Khai Ir Ti worked for the Soviet General Staff in Chita as a translator.

Khai Ir Ti was an NKVD operative who emigrated from Manchuria to Chernogorsk in 1934, becoming a translator from 1935 to 1941, through the Great Purge.

=== East Asians, Turks and Mongols in Soviet Intelligence Operations after Maki Mirage (after 1945) ===
Vasilii Mitrokhin, the former NKVD/KGB archivist detailed the use of not only Chinese and Koreans, but also Siberian Turks and Mongols in the Soviet INO (and later PGU, after 1954 when the NKVD became the KGB, the INO became the PGU- First Main Directorate/Administration). Mitrokhin's notes (he was exfiltrated out of Russia by MI6) dated the use of these Soviet nationalities at least through 1957 (without a termination date). Note that most of the findings and documents in the Mitrokhin Archives are still in off-limits archives to this day. Shin, Pak and Tsoi's Soviet Koreans on the fronts of the Great Fatherland war, 1941-1945 years lists thirteen Soviet Koreans who participated in the NKVD and KGB overseas operations in East Asia from 1941 to 1960 Finally, the historian Sanshiro Hosaka gives two other references for the use of East AsianSoviet illegals sent on operations to the Far East in the 1950s and 1960s. Then there is the case of Evgenii (Evgeny) Kim, a Soviet Korean illegal who operated in Japan from 1967 to 1995. It is interesting that G. Serscikov who wrote the two articles on the life and exploits (his life as a Soviet illegal) writes that the Japanese penetration of the Russian Far East was genuine. This is the Chumakov argument from his monograph, The Matter of Maki Mirage (Delo Maki Mirazh). Chumakov was a former KGB historian. Serscikov states that the Soviets found 200 genuine Japanese spies who had crossed into and were active in the Russian Far East. The two hundred in fact are the official 180 East Asians in Soviet intelligence who were executed and or repressed (sent to the labor camps) from 1936 to 1938. If one counts all those accused during the Great Terror of being actual spies, then the figure should go up to 800,000 "genuine spies" because this is the number accused and sentenced during the Great Terror (1936–1939). Notably both Nikolai Ivanovich Van (Van In Zun) and Grigorii Eliseevich Khan (Khan Chan Ger) were rehabilitated, that is, acquitted of all charges in 1956 and 1958 respectively. Almost all of the other EASI who were Soviet citizens were also rehabilitated.

== See also ==
- Japan–Soviet Union relations
- Sino-Soviet relations
