= Chinese-Lenin School of Vladivostok =

Historical Soviet institution in Vladivostok

The Chinese-Lenin School of Vladivostok (Russian: Китайская Ленинская Школа во Владивостоке, romanized: Kitaiskaya Leninskaya Shkola vo Vladivostoke) was a Soviet educational institution and espionage training center established for the official purpose of educating Chinese students into comrades of socialism. It was one of the major espionage training centers of the Soviet Union for East Asians, opened in late 1924 and operated until early 1938. Its students included Red Army veterans, generally Soviet Koreans and Soviet Chinese born or raised in the USSR, and communist students generally recruited in China.

== History ==
=== Background ===
On October 29, 1923, the Primorskii provincial Communist Party voted to begin to invest in large scale infrastructure construction (schools, universities, radio stations, publishing houses and roads) in the Russian Far East to support their political, educational and occupational campaigns for the Chinese and Koreans of the RFE. This was called korenizatsiia (indigenization) a sort of “Sovietization” program which would assimilate national minorities and in general all Soviet citizens through socialist ideological campaigns at work, school and through radio and newspapers. This socio-political policy and movement took place from 1923 to 1934. The Bolsheviks wanted to organize the “construction” of the Chinese and Koreans of the RFE as Soviet socialist peoples while increasing their educational networks (school systems), the number of “socialist” books, pamphlets and other materials and increase the recruitment efforts towards East Asians into Soviet institutions (as cadres) and as labor union members. The USSR would guard their borders with both military might and ideology (Soviet socialism).

There were immediate benefits for the Koreans and Chinese because most Asians were laborers. The “red corners” throughout the USSR would teach the foreign laborers the rudiments of speaking, writing and reading Russian while providing breaks (while on the job) and reading materials. Some large factories even had rabfaks which were small schools/classrooms in the factory or workplace where workers could study from one to three hours a day.

On June 4, 1925, the Chinese section of the Primorskii Provincial Soviet Party School was formed. On March 1, 1933, this entity formally became the Chinese Lenin School in Vladivostok (CLS). Initially, there were 207 students. The students were separated into those studying at the preparatory stage, middle stage (secondary education) and higher education (university level). In the first year of the CLS, there were only 43 students studying at the university level.

=== Development of the Chinese-Lenin School ===
The Chinese-Lenin School was established with three main directives/goals: one, the teaching and educating future Chinese and Korean comrades/socialists, two, the creation of a publishing house for the translation of socialist literature in the Chinese language and three, the establishment of a recruitment and training center for East Asian (Koreans and Chinese) agents of Soviet intelligence. The OGPU/NKVD also included a subdivision, the INO (the Foreign Division of the Soviet political police) and the acronym GRU (Soviet military intelligence) also included two further subdivisions, the RO, OKDVA among others. OKDVA signified "the Intelligence Division" and "the Counter-intelligence Division" of “the Special [Red] Banner Far Eastern Army.”

Some students at the CLS who were referred to as "cadets", had been recruited from the Soviet intelligence organs. The cadets who were recruited from the GRU and OGPU/NKVD also monitored the students and the everyday life of the university (reactions to various courses, discussions, political thought among various groups at the university, who had influence and why). The CLS served to train qualified intelligence officers to work behind the "cordon" (behind Soviet borders) on the territory of the Japanese puppet state of Manchukuo. The staff of the school was selected not only from Chinese and Russians who had Soviet citizenship as well as Chinese citizens and those who arrived illegally from Manchukuo. Most students were Chinese from China as well as some who were from the USSR. Regarding the composition of Koreans, most of the Koreans at the CLS were ex-military and former NKVD officers.

=== Espionage training of the cadets ===
Those who were selected to become intelligence agents, that is, the cadets, were given false names to study under. In addition to a general training regime, Comrade Usenko taught the student cadets how to shoot a gun on the run and shooting on a target range. The cadets practiced their "tradecraft" two to three times a month visiting safe houses in which they had to pass certain tests working with various types of equipment. There are some parallels with the Nakano school and the evolution of intelligence tradecraft in the 1930s. Both schools wanted well-rounded, well-educated recruits. The students learned all the basics of Soviet spycraft, including intelligence, counter-intelligence, guerrilla warfare, radio communication, and techniques in rezidentura. They were also directed to keep in excellent physical condition. Comrades Mastis and Zybalov gave the cadets lessons in weightlifting and boxing. They were supervised by the Primorsky regional administration of the NKVD secret police.

=== Persecution in the Great Terror ===
Ancha and Miz's research based on the Soviet archives found that at least 180 out of 400 students of the Chinese-Lenin School were purged as "suspect nationalities". The number of Chinese students trained in espionage at the CLS, the KUTV (Communist University of the Toilers of the East) and the Moscow Sun Yat-sen University declined during the Great Terror as most faced immense persecution. Many who survived the terror returned to China to be arrested and interrogated as Stalin concurrently launched the Chinese deportation of 1937-38 (which contained three waves of deportations). Students and graduates of the CLS were also persecuted during the Soviet deportation of Koreans in 1937.

=== Spy cadets of the CLS (Chinese-Lenin School) ===
Ancha and Miz's Chinese Diaspora also gives profiles of cadets who enrolled at the Chinese-Lenin School (CLS) in the mid-1930s. Some of them were not students, but were affiliated with the school for training or as military reserve. The agents are emblematic of what Soviet intelligence wanted in their officers, first-hand knowledge of Manchuria.

Vei Lianshan (born Ui Lianshan) worked in intelligence for the OKDVA (Special Red Banner Far Eastern Army). He was involved in leading an underground anti-Japanese movement in Manchuria. His group and work was uncovered in 1934. In that year, Vei Lianshan crossed the border covertly from Sakhalian (now Heihe, China) to Blagoveshchensk and was reassigned to study at the CLS in 1936.

Another cadet was Van Vychin. It appears that he was a GRU agent who was sent to Manchuria fighting in an anti-Japanese partisan unit. He would repeatedly pass information to Soviet intelligence about the Japanese army. In 1936, he enrolled in the Chinese-Lenin School but was arrested and repressed in 1938 during the Great Terror.

Wang Juntou (codename Fan Shohua) was born in 1912 and served as an intelligence agent in the RO, OKDVA. As part of his work, he repeatedly crossed the Soviet-Manchurian border. In late 1936, he returned illegally from Sakhalian [Heihe], China to the USSR. Beginning in early 1937, he was enrolled at the Chinese-Lenin School.

The spy cadets trained at the CLS would take part in multiple covert operations of the USSR across Asia, including Operation «Maki Mirage» a combined deception and "special tasks" (sabotage) operation against Japan in China (chiefly Manchuria) and Korea. Soviet and post-Soviet Russian historiography championed the "Russian" (European and Russian) officers, and largely downplayed the key role of the East Asian agents (who understood cultural and linguistic nuances that aided their mission). Other USSR operations against Japan along the lines of Maki Mirage included "Dreamers", "Shogun", and "Organizator". The operations heavily involved Chinese-Lenin School graduates from Vladivostok, but also included graduates of other Soviet espionage training schools (including the Moscow KUTV and KUTK who recruited from the East Asian diaspora in the Soviet Union), and several hundred recruits who had entered Soviet secret police by other means (i.e. without being part of an official "espionage university"), many also from the Vladivostok area.

=== Later reports ===
Two declassified CIA reports from March 1946, declassified in 1998 and 2000, mention the existence of Soviet espionage training schools in Vladivostok and the nearby cities of Ussuriysk, Khabarovsk, and Komsomolsk-on-Amur, with the espionage schools having students "of Russian, Chinese, Mongolian, and Korean nationalities." The network was said to have begun operation in 1929, when the Chinese Eastern Railway passed to the Soviets in the Sino-Soviet conflict of 1929. An attached report in August 1947 said there were two schools in Vladivostok and Kraskino and said "it is reported that the intelligence agents sent out by Red Army HQ must be a graduate of the Vladivostok school."

== See also ==
- Moscow Sun Yat-sen University (KUTK)
- Communist University of the Toilers of the East (KUTV)
- Communist University of the National Minorities of the West (KUNMZ)
- International Lenin School
- Millionka

== Bibliography ==
- Ancha, Dmitrii Alekseevich; Miz, Nelli (2015). Китайская диаспора во Владивостоке: страницы истории [Chinese diaspora in Vladivostok: pages of history] (in Russian). Vladivostok: Dal'nauka. ISBN 978-5-8044-1539-7.
- Chang, Jon K. (2014). Burnt by the Sun: The Koreans of the Russian Far East. Honolulu: University of Hawaii Press. ISBN 9780824876746. LCCN 2015046032.
- Chang, Jon K. (2018). "East Asians in Soviet Intelligence and the Chinese-Lenin School of the Russian Far East". Eurasia Border Review. 9 (1).
- Chang, Jon K. (2019a). "East Asians in Soviet Intelligence and the Continuities between Soviet and Russian Intelligence Practices". The Intelligencer. 24 (1).
- Chang, Jon K. (2019b). "East Asians in Soviet Intelligence: New Paradigms and Methods". East and West as Centers in the Centerless World. Tokyo: Okura Info Service.
