= Communist University of the National Minorities of the West =

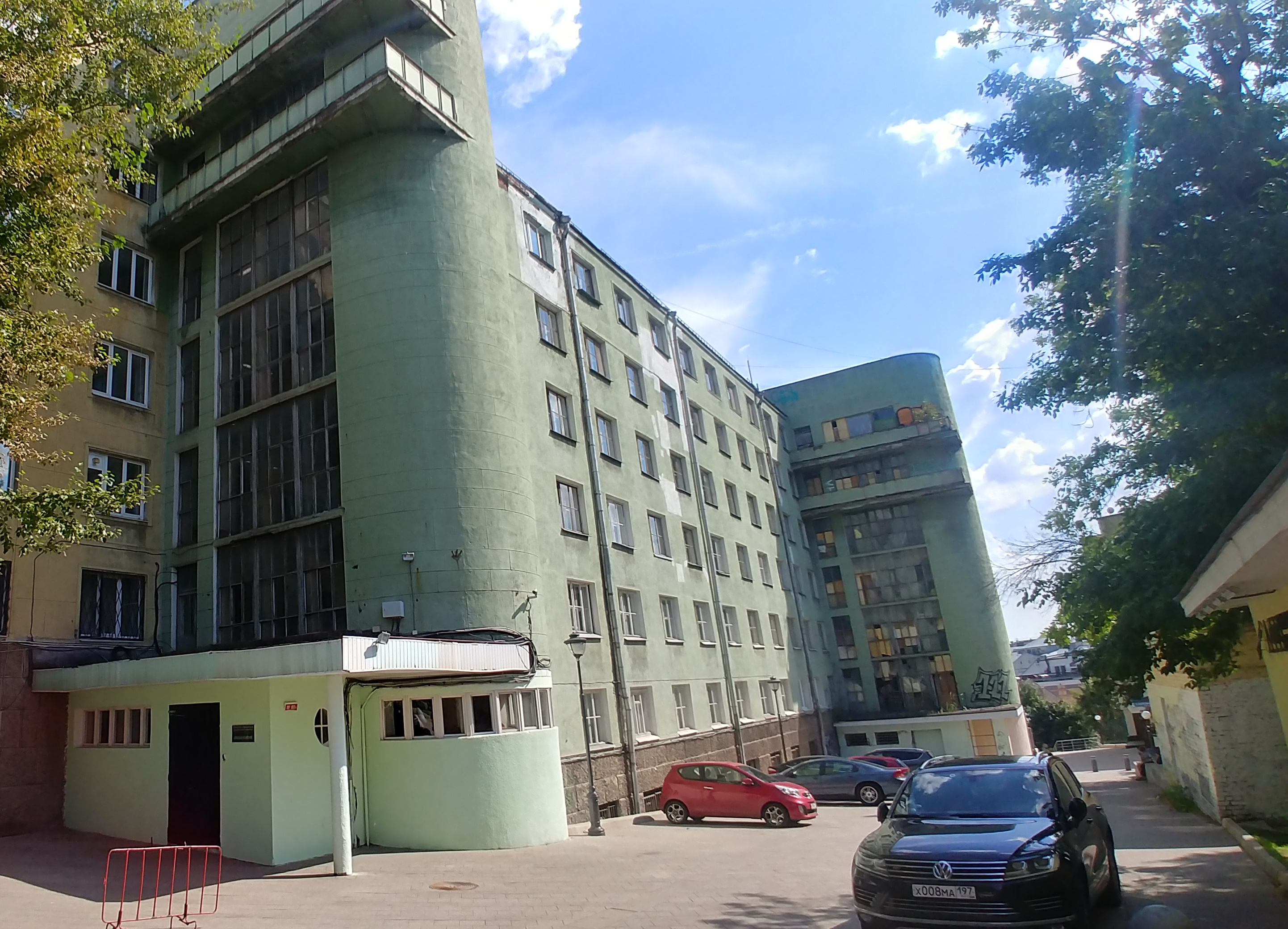
Former Marchlevski University in Moscow, also known as the Communist University of the National Minorities of the West

The Communist University of the National Minorities of the West (KUNMZ – Kommunistichesky Universitet Natsionalnykh Menshinstv Zapada; КУНМЗ - Коммунистический университет национальных меньшинств Запада) was created by a 28 November 1921 decree of the Council of People's Commissars and charged with training party cadres from the western regions of Russia and the Volga Germans. The first rector of the university was the Polish communist Julian Marchlewski, which the university was later named after.

== History ==
In 1929–1930, it began to admit representatives of the communist parties of the Central European, Scandinavian, and Balkan countries, as well as Italy. It turned into an international school for the preparation and education of the "fraternal" communist parties' reserve cadres, aimed at the best political émigrés to study in a 2-3 year special program. Afterward they would have been sent to work in their countries of origin. Political émigrés already living in the USSR, Moscow, KUNMZ organized night courses to study special subjects, i.e. history of the CP of the countries of origin, mass work and party construction.

A similar institution was the Communist University of the Toilers of the East also known as the Far East University was established in 1921 in Moscow by the Communist International as a training college for communist cadres in the colonial world.

KUNMZ was dissolved following the decision of the Executive Committee of the Communist International's Secretariat of 7–8 May 1936.

== Notable alumni ==
Prominent alumni of the KUNMZ include:

- Josip Broz Tito, Secretary-General (later President) of the League of Communists of Yugoslavia (1939–80)
- Edvard Kardelj, Slovene communist political leader
- Ante Ciliga
- Peder Furubotn
- Arvid G. Hansen
- Yrjö Sirola
- Heinrich Vogeler

== See also ==
- Moscow Sun Yat-sen University
- Communist University of the Toilers of the East
- Chinese-Lenin School of Vladivostok
- List of modern universities in Europe (1801–1945)
