= 23rd Busan International Film Festival =

2018 edition of film festival

- Official poster
- Opening film: Beautiful Days
- Closing film: Master Z: The Ip Man Legacy
- Location: Busan Cinema Center
- Founded: 1995
- Hosted by: Kim Nam-gil and Han Ji-min
- Festival date: Opening: 4 October 2018; Closing: 13 October 2018

Busan International Film Festival
- 24th 22nd

The 23rd Busan International Film Festival was held from 4 October to 13 October 2018 at the Busan Cinema Center. A total of 324 films from 79 countries were screened during the festival, including 115 world premieres and 25 international premieres.

The DGK Award, which had been boycotted by the Director's Guild of Korea in 2016 and 2017, was reinstated during this edition of the festival.

== Program ==
=== Opening ===
- Beautiful Days - Jéro YUN (Korea/France)

=== Gala Presentation ===
- First Night Nerves - Stanley Kwan (Hong Kong, China/China)
- Killing - Shinya Tsukamoto (Japan)
- Ode to the Goose - Zhang Lu (Korea)

=== A Window on Asian Cinema ===
- 27 Steps of May - Ravi BHARWANI (Indonesia)
- 3 Faces - Jafar Panahi (Iran)
- A Family Tour - Ying Liang (Taiwan/Hong Kong, China/Singapore/Malaysia)
- Alpha, The Right to Kill - Brillante Mendoza (Philippines)
- Asako I & II - Ryūsuke Hamaguchi (Japan)
- Asandhimitta - Asoka Handagama (Sri Lanka)
- Ash Is Purest White - Jia Zhangke (China/France)
- Bhonsle - Devashish Makhija (India)
- Bulbul Can Sing - Rima Das (India)
- Capernaum - Nadine Labaki (Lebanon/United States)
- The Chrysanthemum and the Guillotine - Takahisa Zeze (Japan)
- Cities of Last Things - Wi Ding HO (Taiwan/China/United States/France)
- Citizen Jake - Mike De Leon (Philippines)
- Come On Irene - Keisuke Yoshida (Japan)
- Complicity - CHIKAURA Kei (Japan/China)
- Dare to Stop Us - SHIRAISHI Kazuya (Japan)
- The Day I Lost My Shadow - Soudade KAADAN (Syria/Lebanon)
- Dear Ex - Mag HSU, HSU Chih Yen (Taiwan)
- Demons - Daniel HUI (Singapore)
- The Enigma of Arrival - SONG Wen (China)
- The Eternity Between Seconds - Alec FIGURACION (Philippines/Korea)
- Every Day a Good Day - Tatsushi Ōmori (Japan)
- Fly By Night - Zahir OMAR (Malaysia)
- Fortitude - Rashid MALIKOV (Uzbekistan)
- The Gentle Indifference of the World - Adilkhan YERZHANOV (Kazakhstan/France)
- The Island - Huang Bo (China)
- Jinpa - Pema Tseden (China)
- Lakbayan (Journey) - Brillante Mendoza, Lav Diaz, Kidlat Tahimik (Philippines)
- Magic Lantern - Amir Naderi (United States)
- The Man From the Sea - Kōji Fukada (Japan/Indonesia/France)
- Manta Ray - Phuttiphong AROONPHENG (Thailand/France/China)
- Manto - Nandita Das (India)
- Memories of My Body - Garin Nugroho (Indonesia)
- My Dear Friend - YANG Pingdao (China)
- Nakorn-Sawan - Puangsoi AKSORNSAWANG (Thailand/Germany)
- Namdev Bhau: In Search of Silence - Dar Gai (India/Ukraine)
- No Matter How Much My Mom Hates Me - MINORIKAWA Osamu (Japan)
- Our Departures - YOSHIDA Yasuhiro (Japan)
- The Rib - ZHANG Wei (China)
- Rona, Azim's Mother - Jamshid MAHMOUDI (Afghanistan/Iran)
- Round Figure - Hardik Mehta (India)
- Sanju - Rajkumar Hirani (India)
- The Scoundrels - Tzu-Hsuan HUNG (Taiwan)
- The Secret of a Leader - Farkhat SHARIPOV (Kazakhstan)
- Shadow - Zhang Yimou (China)
- Signal Rock - Chito S. Roño (Philippines)
- Sincerely Yours, Dhaka - Nuhash HUMAYUN, Syed Ahmed SHAWKI and 9 others (Bangladesh)
- Sly - Kamal Tabrizi (Iran)
- The Song of the Tree - Aibek DAIYRBEKOV (Kyrgyzstan/Russia)
- Ten Years Japan - HAYAKAWA Chie, KINOSHITA Yusuke, TSUNO Megumi, FUJIMURA Akiyo, ISHIKAWA Kei (Japan/Hong Kong, China)
- Ten Years Taiwan - Lekal Sumi Cilangasan, Rina B. TSOU, Po-Shun LU, Pei-Ju HSIEH, Kek Huat LAU (Taiwan/Hong Kong, China)
- Ten Years Thailand - Aditya Assarat, Wisit Sasanatieng, Chulayarnon Siriphol and Apichatpong Weerasethakul (Thailand/Hong Kong, China)
- They Sing up on the Hill - Bat-Amgalan LKHAGVAJAV, Ian ALLARDYCE (Mongolia/United Kingdom)
- The Third Wife - Ash Mayfair (Vietnam)
- Tumbbad - Rahi Anil BRAVE, Adesh PRASAD (India/Sweden)
- Vision - Naomi Kawase (Japan/France)
- Widow of Silence - Praveen Morchhale (India)
- With All My Hypothalamus - Dwein BALTAZAR (Philippines)
- Your Face - Tsai Ming-liang (Taiwan)
- Yours Truly - Sanjoy Nag (India)

=== New Currents ===
- Aurora - Bekzat PIRMATOV (Kyrgyzstan)
- Clean up - KWON Man-ki (Korea)
- Gold Carrier - Touraj ASLANI (Iran)
- His Lost Name - HIROSE Nanako (Japan)
- House of Hummingbird - KIM Bora (Korea)
- House of My Fathers - Suba SIVAKUMARAN (Sri Lanka)
- SAVAGE - CUI Si Wei (China)
- Second Life - PARK Young-ju (Korea)
- The Red Phallus - Tashi GYELTSHEN (Bhutan/Germany/Nepal)
- Vanishing Days - ZHU Xin (China)

=== Korean Cinema Today - Panorama ===
- Along with the Gods: The Last 49 Days - Kim Yong-hwa (Korea)
- Believer - Lee Hae-young (Korea)
- Burning - Lee Chang-dong (Korea)
- The Fortress - Hwang Dong-hyuk (Korea)
- Grass - Hong Sang-soo (Korea)
- Herstory - Min Kyu-dong (Korea)
- Illang: The Wolf Brigade - Kim Jee-woon (Korea)
- Kokdu: A Story of Guardian Angels - Kim Tae-yong (Korea)
- Memories of a Dead End - CHOI Hyunyoung (Korea/Japan)
- Nailed - HA Yoon-jae (Korea)
- Passing Summer - Cho Sung-kyu (Korea)
- Pray - Kang Dong-hun (Korea)
- The Snob - Shin Aga, Lee Sang-cheol (Korea)
- The Spy Gone North - Yoon Jong-bin (Korea)
- Stone Skipping - Kim Jeong-sik (Korea)
- Sunset in My Hometown - Lee Joon-ik (Korea)
- The Witch: Part 1. The Subversion - Park Hoon-jung (Korea)

=== Korean Cinema Today - Vision ===
- A Boy and Sungreen - Ahn Ju-young (Korea)
- A Duck's Grin - Kim Young-nam (Korea/France)
- Between the Seasons - Kim Jun-sik (Korea)
- Bori - Kim Jin-yu (Korea)
- Don't Go Too Far - Park Hyun-yong (Korea)
- Maggie - Yi Ok-seop (Korea)
- Night Light - Kim Moo-young(Korea)
- Our Body - Han Ka-ram (Korea)
- Sub-zero Wind - Kim Yuri (Korea)
- Youngju - Cha Sung-duk (Korea)

=== Korean Cinema Retrospective ===
==== The Pioneer of 1980's Realism: Lee Jang-ho ====
- A Fine, Windy Day - Lee Jang-ho (Korea)
- Children of Darkness Part 1, Young-ae the Songstress - Lee Jang-ho (Korea)
- Declaration of Idiot - Lee Jang-ho (Korea)
- Eoudong - Lee Jang-ho (Korea)
- God's Eye View - Lee Jang-ho (Korea)
- Heavenly Homecoming to Stars - Lee Jang-ho (Korea)
- The Man with Three Coffins - Lee Jang-ho (Korea)
- Widow Dance - Lee Jang-ho (Korea)

=== World Cinema ===
- A Twelve-Year Night - Álvaro Brechner (Spain/Argentina/Uruguay/France)
- El Angel - Luis Ortega (Argentina/Spain)
- At War - Stéphane Brizé (France)
- The Ballad of Buster Scruggs - Ethan Coen, Joel Coen (United States)
- Birds of Passage - Ciro Guerra, Cristina GALLEGO (Colombia/France/Mexico/Denmark)
- Black '47 - Lance Daly (Ireland)
- Blaze - Ethan Hawke (United States)
- Border - Ali Abbasi (Sweden)
- Buy Me a Gun - Julio Hernández Cordón (Mexico/Colombia)
- Capri-Revolution - Mario Martone (Italy)
- Cellar - Igor VOLOSHIN (Slovak Republic/Russia/Czech Republic)
- Climax - Gaspar Noé (France)
- Close Enemies - David Oelhoffen (France/Belgium)
- Cold War - Paweł Pawlikowski (Poland/United Kingdom/France)
- Damsel - Nathan Zellner, David Zellner (United States)
- Dead Women Walking - Hagar BEN-ASHER (United States)
- Dogman - Matteo Garrone (Italy/France)
- Domingo - Fellipe BARBOSA, Clara LINHART (Brazil)
- Donbass - Sergei Loznitsa (Germany/Ukraine/France/Netherlands/Romania)
- Everybody Knows - Asghar Farhadi ( France/Spain/Italy)
- The Fall of the American Empire - Denys Arcand (Canada)
- First Man - Damien Chazelle (United States)
- Happy as Lazzaro - Alice Rohrwacher (Italy/Switzerland/France/Germany)
- High Life - Claire Denis (France/Germany/United States/United Kingdom)
- The Hummingbird Project - Kim Nguyen (Canada/United States)
- I Do Not Care If We Go Down in History as Barbarians - Radu Jude (Romania/Czech Republic/France/Bulgaria/Germany)
- The Image Book - Jean-Luc Godard (France/Switzerland)
- In My Room - Ulrich Köhler (Germany/Italy)
- In This Land Nobody Knew How to Cry - Giorgos Panousopoulos (Greece)
- Jimmie - Jesper GANSLANDT (Sweden)
- The Kindergarten Teacher - Sara Colangelo (United States)
- Let Me Fall - Baldvin Zophoníasson (Iceland/Finland/Germany)
- Loro - Paolo Sorrentino (Italy/France)
- Loveling - Gustavo PIZZI (Brazil/Uruguay)
- Mademoiselle de Joncquières - Emmanuel Mouret (France)
- The Man Who Killed Don Quixote - Terry Gilliam (Spain/Belgium/Portugal/France)
- Mihkel - Ari Alexander ERGIS MAGNÚSSON (Iceland/Estonia/Norway)
- Mug - Małgorzata Szumowska (Poland)
- Never Look Away - Florian Henckel von Donnersmarck (Germany/Italy)
- Non-Fiction - Olivier Assayas (France)
- Our Time - Carlos Reygadas (Mexico/France/Germany/Denmark/Sweden)
- Roma - Alfonso Cuarón (Mexico)
- Sew the Winter to My Skin - Jahmil X.T. QUBEKA (South Africa/Germany)
- The Sisters Brothers - Jacques Audiard (France)
- Sorry Angel - Christophe Honoré (France)
- Steel Country - Simon Fellows (United Kingdom)
- Sunset - László Nemes (Hungary/France)
- The Trouble with You - Pierre Salvadori (France)
- The Wild Pear Tree - Nuri Bilge Ceylan (Turkey/France/Bulgaria/Germany/Bosnia and Herzegovina)
- Woman at War - Benedikt ERLINGSSON (Iceland/France/Ukraine)

=== Flash Forward ===
- The Accused - Gonzalo Tobal (Argentina/Mexico)
- Adam & Evelyn - Andreas Goldstein (Germany)
- Angelo - Markus SCHLEINZER (Austria/Luxembourg)
- Animal - Armando Bó (Argentina)
- Breathing into Marble - Giedrė Beinoriūtė (Lithuania/Latvia/Croatia)
- The Chambermaid - Lila Avilés (Mexico)
- Cutterhead - Rasmus KLOSTER BRO (Denmark)
- The Devil Outside - Andrew Hulme (United Kingdom)
- The Dig - Ryan Tohill, Andy Tohill (United Kingdom)
- Distances - Elena Trapé (Spain)
- The Extraordinary Journey of Celeste Garcia - Arturo Infante (Cuba/Germany)
- Float Like a Butterfly - Carmel Winters (Ireland)
- Fugue - Agnieszka Smoczyńska (Poland/Czech Republic/Sweden)
- Giant Little Ones - Keith Behrman (Canada)
- Girl - Lukas Dhont (Belgium)
- Good Day's Work - Martin TURK (Bosnia and Herzegovina/Turkey/Slovenia)
- The Little Comrade - Moonika Siimets (Estonia)
- The Man Who Bought the Moon - Paolo Zucca (Italy/Albania/Argentina)
- The Man who Surprised Everyone - Natasha Merkulova, Aleksey Chupov (Russia/Estonia/France)
- Museum - Alonso Ruizpalacios (Mexico)
- Our Struggles - Guillaume Senez (Belgium/France)
- Pearl - Elsa Amiel (France/Switzerland)
- Rafiki - Wanuri Kahiu (Kenya/South Africa/France/Germany/Norway/Netherlands)
- Real Love - Claire Burger (France)
- Remember? - Valerio Mieli (Italy/France)
- Sibel - Çağla Zencirci, Guillaume Giovanetti (France/Germany/Luxembourg/Turkey)
- Sofia - Meryem Benm'Barek-Aloïsi (France/Qatar)
- Swimming - Luzie Loose (Germany)
- The Tobacconist - Nikolaus Leytner (Austria/Germany)
- Treat Me Like Fire - Marie MONGE (France)
- Twin Flower - Laura Luchetti (Italy)
- Urgent - Mohcine Besri (Switzerland/Morocco)
- We - René Eller (Netherlands)
- We'll Be Young and Beautiful - Letizia Lamartire (Italy)
- Working Woman - Michal Aviad (Israel)

=== Wide Angle ===
==== Korean Short Film Competition ====
- Beyond the Sea - KIM Si-jin (Korea)
- Cat Day Afternoon - KWON Sungmo (Korea)
- Chicken Fighters - GO Hyeonji (Korea)
- Do Cabbages Grow in Africa? - LEE Na-yeon (Korea)
- Down - LEE Woosoo (Korea)
- Habitat - HONG Eui-jeong (Korea)
- My Little Brother, Seung-hyuk - KIM Deokgeun (Korea)
- The Narrow Gate - KIM Younmi (Korea)
- Only All of Us - HAN Yuwon (Korea)
- Road to Her - CHO Jeehoon (Korea)
- Spring Equinox - SUK Jinhyuk (Korea)
- Stranger - KIM Youjune (Korea)
- Tears - OH Seoung-ho (Korea)
- Water Spray - OH Eunyoung (Korea)

==== Asian Short Film Competition ====
- A Dance for Ren Hang - Yuan Bin Lei (Singapore/Macau China)
- A Million Years - SAN Danech (Cambodia)
- Air - Aizhana Kassymbek (Kazakhstan)
- Chasing Paper - Shoki Lin (Singapore)
- GOLD - Yong Chao LEE (Taiwan/Myanmar)
- In the Middle of Blue - QI Ji (China)
- The Moon Is Bright Tonight - Abinash Bikram Shah (Nepal/Myanmar)
- MOTHER, DAUGHTER, DREAMS - Linh Duong (Vietnam)
- NOOREH - Ashish Pandey (India)
- Similitude - Hariyali DESAI (India)
- The Stain - Nuntanat Duangtisarn (Thailand)
- Tokyo 21st October - OKUYAMA Hiroshi (Japan)
- Void - XU Jianshang (China)
- Waves Interrupted - Dimon John (Sri Lanka)

==== Short Film Showcase ====
- A Cold Summer Night - Yash SAWANT (India)
- A Gift - Aditya Ahmad (Indonesia)
- All These Creatures - Charles WILLIAMS (Australia)
- BELIEVE IT OR NOT - PARK Chan-kyong (Korea)
- The Crying of Tanbur - Anisa Sabiri (Tajikistan)
- Down There - Zhengfan Yang (China/France)
- The Fight - Marco Bellocchio (Italy)
- Heart of Snow: afterlife - Soyoung Kim (Korea)
- Last Order - Joji Villanueva Alonso (Philippines/Singapore)
- Manila is Full of Men Named Boy - Andrew Stephen LEE (Philippines/United States)
- ON THE BORDER - WEI Shujun (China)
- The Open Door - Jamyang Jamtsho Wangchuk (Bhutan/United Kingdom)
- Over There - JANG Minseung (Korea)
- Permanent Resident - Nicole Midori WOODFORD (Singapore)
- Sex, Fear, and Hamburgers - Eldar SHIBANOV (Kazakhstan)
- Supermonk - Shenang Gyamjo TAMANG (Taiwan/Nepal)
- Till Next Time - Paulie HUANG Chih Chia (Taiwan)

==== Documentary Competition ====
- A War of Memories - Bora LEE-KIL (Korea)
- ARMY - Kelvin Kyungkun PARK (Korea)
- KIM-GUN - KANG Sang-woo (Korea)
- Opening Closing Forgetting - James T. Hong (Taiwan)
- Our Happy Birth Day - Angel SU, Mimi CHEN (Taiwan)
- Re-sound - JEONG Ilgeon (Korea)
- Shusenjo: The Main Battleground of Comfort Women Issue - Miki Dezaki (United States/Japan)
- The Song of Grassroots - Yuda Kurniawan (Indonesia)
- The Strangers - MYOUNG So-hee (Korea)
- Swimming Through The Darkness - Supriyo SEN (India)
- Unknown Knowns - HAN Hyesung (Korea)

==== Documentary Showcase ====
- Absence - Ekta MITTAL (India)
- BNK48: Girls Don′t Cry - Nawapol Thamrongrattanarit (Thailand)
- Boy Soldiers: The Secret War in Okinawa - MIKAMI Chie, OYA Hanayo (Japan)
- Bruce Lee and the Outlaw - Joost Vandebrug (United Kingdom/Netherlands/Czech Republic)
- Chi-Town - Nick BUDABIN (United States)
- The Children Gone to Poland - CHOO Sangmee (Korea)
- Chinese Portrait - Wang Xiaoshuai (China/Hong Kong, China)
- Cloud, Encore - Jung Sung-il (Korea)
- Crossing Beyond - Yi Seung-jun (Korea)
- Dead Souls - Wang Bing (France/Switzerland)
- Dear My Genius - KOO Yunjoo (Korea)
- Fahrenheit 11/9 - Michael Moore (United States)
- Gravity of the Tea - Jung Sung-il (Korea)
- Land from God - Kevin Piamonte (Philippines)
- Last Scene - PARK Baeil (Korea)
- Light A Candle, Write A History - Candlelight Revolution - Nungcool (Korea)
- Littleboy 12725 - KIM Jigon (Korea)
- Minding the Gap - LIU Bing (United States)
- Out - Denis PARROT (France)
- The State Against Mandela And The Others - Nicolas CHAMPEAUX, Gilles PORTE (France/South Africa)
- Tranny Fag - Kiko GOIFMAN, Claudia PRISCILLA (Brazil)
- The Trial - Sergei Loznitsa (Netherlands)
- Turning 18 - HO Chao-ti (Taiwan)
- What You Gonna Do When the World's on Fire? - Roberto MINERVINI (Italy/United States/France)

==== Cinekids ====
- Circleen, Coco and the Wild Rhinoceros - Jannik Hastrup (Denmark)
- Gordon & Paddy - Linda HAMBÄCK (Sweden)
- Little Miss Dolittle - Joachim Masannek (Germany)
- Once in a Child′s Life - Sara Momtazian, Jesahel Newton, Mafer Agahi (South Africa/Ecuador/Colombia)
- The Witch Hunters - Rasko Miljkovic (Serbia/Macedonia)

==== Animation Showcase ====
- Funan - Denis Do (France/Belgium/Luxembourg)
- Ireesha, The Daughter of Elf-king - CHANG Hyung-yun (Korea)
- Mirai - Mamoru Hosoda (Japan)
- Monkey Magic - MA Xihai (China)
- The Shaman Sorceress - AHN Jaehuun (Korea)
- The Tower - Mats GRORUD (Norway/France/Sweden)

=== Open Cinema ===
- Arctic - Joe Penna (Iceland)
- Dying to Survive - WEN Muye (China)
- Kursk - Thomas Vinterberg (Luxembourg/Belgium)
- More than Blue - Gavin LIN (Taiwan)
- My Tyrano: Together, Forever - Kōbun Shizuno (Korea/Japan/China)
- One Nation, One King - Pierre Schoeller (France)
- Penguin Highway - ISHIDA Hiroyasu (Japan)
- Summer - Kirill Serebrennikov (Russia)

=== Special Programs in Focus ===
==== Philippines Special Program ====
- The 1970s - Chito S. Roño (Philippines)
- A Portrait of the Artist as Filipino - Lamberto V. Avellana (Philippines)
- As We Were - Eddie Romero (Philippines)
- The Blacksmith - Ronald Allan POE Jr (Philippines)
- Cain and Abel - Lino Brocka (Philippines)
- The Dream of Eleutaria - Remton Siega ZUASOLA (Philippines)
- Miracle - Ishmael Bernal (Philippines)
- Morals - Marilou Diaz-Abaya (Philippines)
- Third World Hero - Mike De Leon (Philippines)
- Three Godless Years - Mario O'Hara (Philippines)

=== Midnight Passion ===
- Arctic - Joe Penna (Iceland)
- The Golem - Yoav Paz, Doron Paz (Ukraine/Israel/United States)
- Halloween - David Gordon Green (United States)
- The House That Jack Built - Lars von Trier (Denmark)
- Isabelle - Robert HEYDON (Canada)
- Lifechanger - Justin McConnell (Canada)
- The Prey - Jimmy Henderson (Cambodia)
- The Purity of Vengeance - Christoffer Boe (Denmark)
- What Keeps You Alive - Colin Minihan (Canada)

=== Busan Classic ===
- Black Peter - Miloš Forman (Czech Republic)
- Farewell My Concubine - Chen Kaige (Hong Kong, China/China)
- The Fate of Lee Khan - King Hu (Hong Kong, China)
- Koryo Saram - Lavrenti Son (Kazakhstan)
- The Land of Vaduls - Lavrenti Son (Kazakhstan)
- Munna Bhai M.B.B.S. - Rajkumar Hirani (India)
- The Other Side of the Wind - Orson Welles (United States)
- Padre Padrone - Paolo and Vittorio Taviani (Italy)
- Rekava - Lester James Peries (Sri Lanka)
- The Scar - Cherd Songsri (Thailand)
- The Seventh Seal - Ingmar Bergman (Sweden)
- The Year of the Dragon - CHOI Kook-in (Kazakhstan)

=== Closing ===
- Master Z: The Ip Man Legacy - Yuen Woo-ping (Hong Kong, China/China)

== Awards ==
- New Currents Award
  - Clean up - KWON Man-ki (Korea)
  - SAVAGE - CUI Si Wei (China)
- BIFF Mecenat Award
  - ARMY - Kelvin Kyungkun PARK (Korea)
  - Opening Closing Forgetting - James T. Hong (Taiwan)
  - Special Mention : A War of Memories - Bora LEE-KIL (Korea)
- Sonje Award
  - Cat Day Afternoon - KWON Sungmo (Korea)
  - NOOREH - Ashish Pandey (India)
- Actor & Actress of the Year Award
  - Choi Hee-seo - Our Body (Korea)
  - Lee Joo-young - Maggie (Korea)
- FIPRESCI Award
  - The Red Phallus - Tashi GYELTSHEN (Bhutan/Germany/Nepal)
- NETPAC Award
  - House of Hummingbird - KIM Bora (Korea)
- Kim Jiseok Award
  - The Rib - ZHANG Wei (China)
  - Rona, Azim's Mother - Jamshid MAHMOUDI (Afghanistan/Iran)
- Citizen Critics' Award
  - Maggie - Yi Ok-seop (Korea)
- Busan Cinephile Award
  - Bruce Lee and the Outlaw - Joost Vandebrug (United Kingdom/Netherlands/Czech Republic)
- DGK Award
  - Bori - Kim Jin-yu (Korea)
  - Sub-zero Wind - Kim Yuri (Korea)
- CGV Arthouse Award
  - Maggie - Yi Ok-seop (Korea)
- KBS Independent Film Award
  - Maggie - Yi Ok-seop (Korea)
- KTH Award
  - Clean up - KWON Man-ki (Korea)
  - A Boy and Sungreen - Ahn Ju-young (Korea)
- The Asian Filmmaker of the Year
  - Ryuichi Sakamoto (Japan)
- Korean Cinema Award
  - Martine Thérouanne (France)
  - Jean-Marc Thérouanne (France)
