= Dheer Momaya =

Indian film producer

- Citizenship: Indian
- Occupation: Film producer
- Years active: 2016–present
- Notable work: Last Film Show, Namdev Bhau: In Search of Silence
- Spouse: Dar Gai (2019–present)

Dheer Momaya is an Indian director, screenwriter, and an Oscar-shortlisted producer. He is best known for producing acclaimed films such as Namdev Bhau: In Search of Silence and Last Film Show, as well as popular music videos including Sage, Liggi, and Kasoor. He is also the founder of Jugaad Motion Pictures.

== Personal life ==
Dheer Momaya was born to Chhaya and Nirmal Momaya. He completed his Bachelor of Management Studies at H.R. College of Commerce and Economics. In 2019, he married Dar Gai.

== Career ==
In 2016, Dheer Momaya co-founded Jugaad Motion Pictures alongside Ukrainian-Indian director Dar Gai. He produced his first feature film "Teen Aur Aadha" released in 2017. It has been co-produced by Anurag Kashyap. The film was showcased in 40 international film festivals, winning 18 awards, and eventually streamed globally on Netflix. For his work on the film, Dheer won the Best Feature Award at the Santa Cruz International Film Festival in Argentina, shared with Dar Gai.

Following the success of Teen Aur Aadha, Dheer produced Namdev Bhau: In Search of Silence, which premiered at the Busan International Film Festival and was featured at several prestigious festivals worldwide.

Dheer's work has also earned him accolades in the international film industry, with his selection as a top producing talent at the Berlinale Talents Program. He was also one of six Indians chosen for the 2019 Trans Atlantic Partners program, held in Germany and Canada.

In 2021, Dheer was recognized on Forbes’ 30 Under 30 list in the Digital Content Creator category. The following year, he won the 69th National Film Award for Best Feature Film in Gujarati for Chhello Show.

In addition to his film work, Dheer has produced highly successful music videos. His video for Prateek Kuhad's Cold/mess was named "The Best Music Video of the Year" by Rolling Stone. His other music videos, Sage and Liggi by Ritviz, have amassed over 200 million views on YouTube and have become iconic "millennial anthems." He also directed the music video for "Kasoor" by Prateek Kuhad, filmed entirely on a phone.

Dheer also served as the producer for the 2021 film Last Film Show, directed by Pan Nalin. The film was selected as India’s official entry for the Best International Feature Film category at the Oscars 95th Academy Awards, making it the first Indian film in 21 years to be shortlisted for the category.

Beyond feature films, Dheer has developed and produced award-winning commercials and digital content for major multinational brands, including Levi’s, Volkswagen, Xiaomi, Bacardi, Netflix, Unilever, Bumble, and Tinder. In 2023, He launched Molfa Music under Jugaad Motion Pictures, a record label to support Independent musicians.

Dheer produced the upcoming Bengali film Shadowbox (also known as Baksho Bondi), starring Tillotama Shome, Chandan Bisht, and Sayan Karmakar. The movie is set to release in theatres in 2025.

== Filmography ==
=== Films ===
| Title | Year |
|---|---|
| Teen Aur Aadha | 2018 |
| Namdev Bhau: In Search of Silence | 2018 |
| Cabin Fever (Web series) | 2020 |
| Last Film Show | 2021 |
| Shadowbox | 2025 |
