= Music of Royal Space Force: The Wings of Honnêamise =

Music of the 1987 anime film

During the production of Royal Space Force: The Wings of Honnêamise, the 1987 debut work of anime studio Gainax, the only member of its main staff known to the general public was its musical director, electronic music pioneer Ryuichi Sakamoto, who had recently overseen the soundtrack to the top Japanese box office hit of 1986, Koneko Monogatari. Sakamoto and his assistants from Koneko Monogatari, musicians Koji Ueno, Yuji Nomi, and Haruo Kubota, composed 47 pieces of background music for Royal Space Force in a process that involved using "keywords" given by film director Hiroyuki Yamaga, examining the film's storyboards, making arrangements based on early "prototype" compositions, as well as composing several new original pieces of music as the project developed. 15 of the arrangements would be featured on the film's original soundtrack album.

Although Sakamoto was strongly associated with the film's promotion at the time through his appearance at its formal press announcement and in a trailer for the movie, in later years he was reluctant to discuss the project, to the extent that media outlets reported that his soundtrack for the 2018 Kōbun Shizuno film My Tyrano: Together, Forever was Sakamoto's first time composing a soundtrack for an animated work. Toshio Okada, who had been closely involved in planning Royal Space Force, expressed the belief that Sakamoto's views originated from a conflict that arose late in production over whether Sakamoto or the film's sound director Atsumi Tashiro should have final authority to edit the musical arrangements, a conflict Okada believed became irreconcilable due to the end of production overlapping with Sakamoto's absence from Japan working on Bernardo Bertolucci's The Last Emperor, a project for which Sakamoto would share the Academy Award for Best Original Score.

== Music ==
=== Sakamoto joins the project ===
In April 1986, Ryuichi Sakamoto was selected as the musical director of Royal Space Force. Sakamoto was already regarded for his work in the pioneering electronic band Yellow Magic Orchestra and his soundtrack for the 1983 Nagisa Oshima film Merry Christmas, Mr. Lawrence which had won the United Kingdom BAFTA Award for Best Film Music; the year following the release of Royal Space Force, Sakamoto would share the Academy Award for Best Original Score with David Byrne and Cong Su for their soundtrack to The Last Emperor. In 1986 Sakamoto was prominent also in the Japanese domestic film market for his soundtrack to the top-grossing nationwide movie of that year, Koneko Monogatari. Sakamoto was one of five staff members who represented the project at the official announcement of the film later that year, and was likewise one of the five names included in a trailer for the movie; (Note: The other representatives at the announcement were Yamaga, Okada, and Yoshiyuki Sadamoto from Gainax, and Makoto Yamashina from Bandai; the other four names featured in the trailer were Yamaga, Sadamoto, Hideaki Anno, and Hiromasa Ogura.) Ryusuke Hikawa commented that in fact the musical director was the only member of Royal Space Force's main staff known to the general public at the time of the film's production. Sakamoto brought into the Royal Space Force project his prior collaborators on Koneko Monogatari, musicians Koji Ueno, Yuji Nomi, and Haruo Kubota. During a 1998 interview with Kentaro Takekuma, Hiroyuki Yamaga remarked that asking Sakamoto to do the music for Royal Space Force required a special increase of 40 million yen above its previous 360 million yen budget, which, together with an additional 40 million yen deficit incurred while making the film, raised its final production costs to 440 million yen, and, when including advertising expenses, its estimated total costs in the accounting records to 800 million yen.

The first commercial release of music for the project occurred three months before the Japanese debut of the film itself, in the form of a December 1986 limited edition 12" maxi single entitled The Wings of Honnêamise: Image Sketch, issued on School, Sakamoto's label within Midi Records, and containing early mixes of four key initial pieces he had composed for the film's soundtrack, referred to on Image Sketch only under the names "Prototype A", "Prototype B", "Prototype C", and "Prototype D". (Note: "Prototype D" was the Royal Space Force anthem; the version on Image Sketch featured Sakamoto's own vocals. Gainax had given Sakamoto a sardonic checklist of items to guide the composition of the Royal Space Force's pompous anthem, requesting for example that it sing of the galaxy even though the force had never even left the planet, that its lyrics evoke manly phrases befitting the 1950s and 60s generation, and that "on a sunny day, you can feel the tranquility of ten people singing it in the middle of a graveyard." The anthem's lyrics would in fact be written by Kenzo Saeki, a bandmate of Haruo Kubota in the group Pearl Brothers, later to create the musical score for the 2006 anime version of Welcome to the N.H.K..) Sakamoto commented in the liner notes for Image Sketch that when he first heard the movie was going to be called "Royal Space Force", he thought that based on the title it was going to be "a film by a far-right organization (my mistake!)" He stated that what struck him immediately about the film's storyboards was "the precision of its detail" (Note: In seeming contrast to Sakamoto's remarks, Ueno commented that although they had the chance to see the film's storyboards before beginning work on the music, they could only vaguely imagine based on the images what the actual scenes would look like.) which convinced him that "these people probably liked the same things I did," and that one of the main reasons he accepted the job was that he saw a resemblance between the meticulous care he put into his music and the efforts the filmmakers were taking with Royal Space Force. Sakamoto concluded by expressing his belief that such "finely crafted" contemporary Japanese animation and music would henceforth be increasingly exported to overseas markets in the future. Yamaga's own remarks in the liner notes declared that "while it was true that this [film] was not made entirely from original materials," it possessed as its "underlying image, a collection of 'deep sensibilities'" that arose from the distinct personal characteristics of each creator who worked upon it, "a shout from each individual's unique sense of self that bleeds through even if covered over. In the same way, Mr. Sakamoto dismissed using the styles of fill-in-the-blank, (Note: Yamaga had begun his comments in the liner notes by saying that today works were being made in "the easy way", by following a maru-maru kaze no…; maru-maru in this case having the sense of "fill-in-the-blank" and kaze no having the sense of a style or following a trend, and so meaning works made in whatever style was popular. Kaze can also have the meaning of "wind," and Kaze no tani no Naushika (Nausicaä of the Valley of the Wind) was being used by the distributors of Royal Space Force as their promotional model based on Nausicaä's popularity, despite the dissimilarities between the two works.) and created an ultimate sound based on his own personal sensibility. I hope you will enjoy that profound deep sensibility of his own."

=== Composition process ===
In an interview conducted shortly before the movie's release with Ueno, Kubota, and Keiko Shinozaki, the A&R coordinator for Midi, Shinozaki described the working process behind the composition of the film music. Ueno, Kubota, and Nomi took as their starting points a set of "keywords" that Yamaga had given them as director, together with the four prototype compositions Sakamoto (whom they referred to as kyōju, "Professor") had made. Kubota detailed the creation of the "chart table" that determined the placement of the various soundtrack elements; made by the music director and sound director [that is, by Sakamoto and Atsumi Tashiro], the chart noted each scene that would require music, which, as Kubota remarked, naturally determined, based on scene length, the length of the needed music. The chart also included notes on the basic kind of music to be used in the scene, and in particular, which of the four prototypes to use as a basis for their arrangements. Ueno, Kubota, and Nomi then decided which scenes in the film they would each arrange, and went to work on their arrangements separately, neither working on them in the studio together, or with Sakamoto. After arranging a piece, they would reassemble as a group and listen to each other's work, and then go their separate ways once again to continue the process.

Of the 47 musical arrangements made for the film based on the chart, of which 15 were later selected to be featured on The Wings of Honnêamise~Royal Space Force Original Soundtrack album released in March 1987, most were developed as different variations on one of Sakamoto's original four prototypes; for example, "Prototype A" would become the basis of the Original Soundtrack's "Main Theme"; whereas "Prototype B" would become "Riquinni's Theme." A few pieces were created based on arrangements combining two of the prototypes, as with "Rishō", used during the ascent of Shiro in the rocket. (Note: Rishō can be translated as "rising," but the kanji used for the track's title, 「離床」have the specific meaning of rising from one's sickbed.) 13 of the 47 pieces, however, were not based on any of the four basic prototypes, but were instead new original compositions created later in the soundtrack process by Ueno, Kubota, Nomi, or Sakamoto himself. Several of these 13 pieces were featured on the Original Soundtrack, including Sakamoto's "Ministry of Defense," used for the General's nighttime meeting with his superiors, Kubota and Ueno's "War," used for the battle to capture the launch site, Nomi's "The Final Stage," played after the General decides to proceed with the countdown, and Ueno's "Dr. Gnomm's Funeral". Two of the 47 pieces combined variations on the prototypes with new material, most prominently "Out To Space," used for Shiro's monologue from orbit and the subsequent visionary sequence, which employed successive variations on "B" and "A", followed by an additional original composition by Sakamoto. The background music pieces not included on the Original Soundtrack would eventually be collected as a bonus feature on the 1990 Royal Space Force~The Wings of Honnêamise Memorial Box LaserDisc edition, where the pieces were accompanied by images from the film's concept art; this bonus feature would also be included as an extra on the 2000 Manga Entertainment DVD.

=== Reflections on Sakamoto's involvement ===
Toshio Okada made only two brief mentions of Sakamoto's musical role on Royal Space Force in his memoir; (Note: The first reference to Sakamoto is a comment that the budget for Royal Space Force had already "ballooned" as Gainax extensively expanded their ideas for the look and content of the full-length movie beyond the pilot film, until Bandai's financial commitment to the project had passed the "point of no return, and Ryuichi Sakamoto was chosen as the music director." The second reference is in regard to the idea of re-using Sakamoto's music to save money in making a proposed early sequel concept Okada refers to as Honneamise 2.) in his 1995 interview with Animerica, Okada had remarked that he was not personally a fan of Sakamoto's music: "I didn't really like Sakamoto's style back then, or even now. But I know his talent, his ability to construct a strong score, and write an entire orchestration. That's why I chose him," asserting that "at that time, he was the only choice for an original movie soundtrack. Composers for ordinary anime music can make a pop song, something in the enka style— you know, just songs, like an opening theme. But they can't do orchestration, or a sad melody like ["Riquinni's Theme"]." When asked if he had considered approaching Jo Hisaishi, associated with scoring the films of Hayao Miyazaki, Okada replied, "Jo Hisaishi always writes one or two melodies, and the rest of the soundtrack is constructed around them. You can see that in Nausicaä and Laputa. But his kind of style wouldn't have worked for [Royal Space Force]. As I said— for better or worse, the film has a very differentiated structure, and we needed a score to match that. So I told Sakamoto, "Don't make the soundtrack all by yourself. You should direct it, but get a staff with real musical talent, young and old, and incorporate their work." (Note: The composer had noted however in 1986 that he had already begun the practice of working with a staff while making his previous soundtrack for Koneko Monogatari, remarking of Ueno, Nomi, and Kubota: "I enjoy working with them, and it's very much a smooth process. I'm proud to say that we are the most efficient group of composers in Japan today.")

Whereas Sakamoto's own 2009 autobiography made extensive reference to his other 1987 film project The Last Emperor, it does not discuss Royal Space Force. Sakamoto's film score for the Kōbun Shizuno film My Tyrano: Together, Forever was reported by media outlets in 2018 as his first time composing a soundtrack for an animated work; noting his recent Grammy and Golden Globe nominations for The Revenant, The Hollywood Reporter quoted Sakamoto as saying that "he had avoided animated film projects for a long time because he was more used to composing for serious live-action dramas" while The Japan Times related, "Ryuichi Sakamoto has spent a career steeped in high drama [but] the Japanese star revealed he had now realized a childhood dream by working for the first time in animation. 'I grew up watching Astro Boy,' said Sakamoto, referring to the cartoon crime fighter. 'So I have a great respect for this world.'" Earlier that year, in an interview with film critic Nobuhiro Hosoki during Sakamoto's visit to the Tribeca Film Festival for the screening of the documentary on his career Ryuichi Sakamoto: Coda, the composer remarked that he had been in charge of the music for an anime film "35 [sic] years ago, but I didn't like it very much (so I can't say the title)." (Note: Sakamoto did include pieces from the Royal Space Force soundtrack on two subsequent 1993 Midi compilation releases: the "Main Theme" on Gruppo Musicale II, an album that included his groundbreaking electronica track "Riot In Lagos," and "Riquinni's Theme" on Opera, an album that also featured the themes to Merry Christmas, Mr. Lawrence and The Last Emperor. Midi re-issued the Royal Space Force soundtrack itself in 1993 as well. Sakamoto also made what Hosoki described as a surprising revelation that, two or three years prior to the interview, Isao Takahata had hired him to compose the music for an anime project, but, laughed Sakamoto, "my music was too serious and he ended up firing me.")

Commenting on Sakamoto's remarks in 2018, Okada recalled that the composer had been sincerely excited about creating the music for Royal Space Force early on in the project, and had studied its storyboards closely for inspiration; (Note: Sakamoto had remarked that in composing for My Tyrano he had also been obliged to work from an incomplete film: "When I was making the music, the film featured only [black and white] animated silhouettes and there was no dialogue. I had to resort to my own imagination to compose.") the liner notes for the 1987 Original Soundtrack album noted a music planning meeting where the enthusiasm was so great that the participants ended up staying for 12 hours. Okada felt that Sakamoto may have viewed the storyboards, with their breakdown of scene lengths into seconds, as a guide that would permit him to achieve a perfect sync between his music and the images; however, Okada noted, the actual length of a finished cut of animation may vary slightly from the storyboard, and ultimately the sound director has the prerogative to edit or adjust the music accordingly to fit. Okada believed that such issues could have been resolved if he had the opportunity to speak directly with Sakamoto and make adjustments, but after a point communication with Sakamoto had become indirect, relayed through his then-management, Yoroshita Music. The composer himself had been away from Japan during the final months of Royal Space Force's production, which overlapped with the shooting schedule of The Last Emperor that had begun in China in early August 1986 and which was still continuing as of February 1987 in Rome; Sakamoto had been working in both locations as an actor in the film, portraying the role of Masahiko Amakasu. (Note: Although he would receive the Academy Award for his soundtrack work on the film, Sakamoto commented in 2017 that he had in fact not planned originally on writing any music for The Last Emperor; the request to do so came several months after shooting had concluded, via a sudden phone call from the producer. Sakamoto remarked that he was given only one week to compose his contributions.) Okada asserted that although Sakamoto and Yamaga themselves never came into conflict, the situation led to frustration among the film's staff, and in particular between Yoroshita and sound director Atsumi Tashiro; Tashiro eventually asked Okada to make the call as to whether he or Sakamoto would have final say on placing the music. (Note: The chart table containing the exact scene placements and composition details for the film's musical tracks was featured on the back cover of Image Sketch, released on December 20, 1986, indicating these decisions had been made by that point.) Okada chose Tashiro, remarking that he accepted responsibility for the decision although he believed that it was what soured Sakamoto on Royal Space Force, to the extent of not discussing it as part of his professional history as a film composer.
