= You Are Umasou =

Heart And Yummie

おまえうまそうだな (Omae Umasō da na)
- Anime television series

Miyanishi Tatsuya Gekijō: Omae Umasō da na
- Directed by: Masaya Fujimori
- Written by: Hiroaki Jinno; Osamu Murakami
- Studio: Kids
- Licensed by: NA: Discotek Media
- Original network: TV Tokyo
- Original run: October 4, 2010 – October 29, 2010
- Episodes: 20
- Anime film
- Directed by: Masaya Fujimori
- Written by: Hiroaki Jinno; Osamu Murakami
- Music by: Tamiya Terashima
- Studio: Ajia-do Animation Works
- Licensed by: NA: Discotek Media
- Released: October 16, 2010
- Runtime: 90 minutes
- Anime film

Anata o Zutto Aishiteru
- Directed by: Gong-Sook Choe
- Written by: Hisao Masuda; Tatsuya Miyanishi
- Studio: Media Castle
- Licensed by: NA: Discotek Media
- Released: June 6, 2015
- Runtime: 82 minutes
- Anime film

My Tyrano: Together, Forever
- Directed by: Kōbun Shizuno
- Written by: Dai Satō; Kimiko Ueno; Naohiro Fukushima
- Music by: Ryuichi Sakamoto
- Studio: Tezuka Productions
- Released: August 14, 2019 (South Korea); December 10, 2021 (Japan)
- Runtime: 108 minutes

You Are Umasou (Japanese: おまえうまそうだな, Hepburn: Omae Umasō da na; "You look tasty") is a Japanese picture book series by Tatsuya Miyanishi, published by Poplar. The series has spawned three animated film adaptations.

== Plot ==
In the Late Cretaceous Period, a female Maiasaura finds an egg and adopts it as her own. She takes it to her nest near Egg Mountain, a volcano with a giant egg shaped rock. One day, a marauding pack of Troodon attack the nesting grounds, snatching and eating the Maiasaura eggs. The mother loses all but two of her eggs, one of which being the egg she saved. When the eggs hatch, one is a male Maiasaura, whom the mother names Light, and the other is a Tyrannosaurus, named Heart. The herd leader plans to kill Heart in order to prevent him from eating anyone when he gets older, but the mother Maiasaura stops him, arguing that he is a newborn and harmless. The leader gives her the chance to leave him in the wild, but she feels guilty about abandoning Heart and decides to leave the herd and raise her children by herself.

Years later, Light and Heart live in the forest with their mother, safe from predators and free from the herd. Heart is unaware of his carnivorous nature and can only eat berries. While they are playing, Heart and Light fell from a cliff into a swamp, where they meet a sloth mother singing a song about tyrannosaurs and describing their appearances. The sloth sees Heart and retreats in fear, while Light jokes about the appearance of Heart, saying that he looks like the description in the song. His words make Heart sad and he starts crying. When their mother finds them, she forces Light about to apologize. Although Heart asks their mother to not blame Light, he begins to question things internally.

As Heart is unable to live by eating plants and can't sustain himself of berries, he travels outside the forest and into the plains to look for food that he can eat. He sees a Triceratops fighting a pack of Tyrannosaurus, one of which is impaled by one of its horns and killed. Suddenly from the mist enters Baku, a particularly large Tyrannosaurus with a scar over his right eye, who slams the Triceratops to the ground, killing it. After watching the pack eat the corpse, Heart panics and tries to retreat quietly to avoid being eaten as well. However, one of the Tyrannosaurus, Gonza, notices him and that he smells like a herbivore. Baku asks him about his family, and Heart fearfully answers that he has a brother and a mother, not telling that they are Maiasaura. Baku explains the lifestyle of a predator, which makes Heart flee in panic, without noticing that Gonza is following him. After rejoining Light, Heart tells him disdainfully about his experience with the Tyrannosaurus. Gonza arrives and threatens to eat Light. Light yells to Heart to save himself, causing Gonza to wonder why a Maiasaura would take care of a Tyrannosaurus. Light explains that Heart is his brother before Gonza reveals Heart's real species. Heart denies this and attacks Gonza, ripping off his tail and causing Gonza to flee in pain, feeling betrayed. Upon eating the tail, Heart realizes that Gonza was telling the truth. He tackles Light, unable to control his predatory instincts, and decides to run away to avoid killing and eating his family.

Years later, Heart is a fully grown dinosaur with enhanced hunting and martial arts skills, which he demonstrates by beating a whole herd of Titanosaurus, and having a step forward from Gonza's pack. Meanwhile, Light is allowed to return to the herd as Heart doesn't live with them anymore. One day, Heart discovers an egg which houses an Ankylosaurus. When the baby hatches, Heart tells him that he is "Umasou" (the Japanese word for delicious), and he prepares to devour him, until the baby jumps and cuddles Heart, believing that Heart was his father and that Umasou was his name, much to Heart's surprise and confusion. He decides to raise him, initially to wait until he fattens enough for him to eat, but he gives up this scheme after a bad dream about his old family. Umasou acts very loving toward Heart, but Heart remains emotionally distant to Umasou as he doesn't know exactly how to deal with him. Later, Heart goes to hunt a Parasaurolophus, leaving Umasou waiting for him in the grass. A nearby Chilantaisaurus notices him and is about to eat him, but Heart arrives and sends it flying away with a kick. Umasou cheers Heart for saving him, and Heart angrily tells him that the Chilantaisaurus could have eaten him and to stay alert for predators. The next day, Umasou wants to gather berries to eat with his father, while Heart frantically searches for Umasou. He gives up the search and loses hope, when Umasou returns with the berries like nothing happened. Enraged, Heart yells at Umasou to go away, which makes Umasou cry. Heart notices the berries and apologizes for yelling at him before starting to eat to make him feel better, even starting to be moved. Umasou mentions that he got the berries from an elderly Tyrannosaurus who has grown too old to eat solid food and eats the berries, who introduced himself as Bekon. The two go to meet him and he explains that one day, a massive pack of Giganotosaurus arrived from the south and went on a rampage, killing everything in their path, forcing Baku to fight them by himself. The battle resulted in him losing an eye and receiving his scar, but he defeated the Giganotosaurus and is now the king of the plains. After Bekon asks Heart how he will deal with the fact that Umasou will one day be separated from him due to their respective condition, Heart decides to train Umasou to protect himself from predators.

Even after all the time he has spent with Umasou, Heart still didn't accept him as his son. He tricks him into having a race where, if Umasou wins, Heart will stay with him forever, and lets him run away from Heart. But Umasou enters the outlands where encounters Gonza's pack, who nearly kill him. Realizing Umasou is in danger, Heart goes to the rescue and sees Gonza about to eat Umasou. In a rage, Heart attacks Gonza and defeats the gang. Baku appears and decides to banish Heart as a punishment for beating others of his kind. Once Heart leaves the plains, he is relieved to see that Umasou, although weakened, is alive and safe. But Umasou also notices that he didn't catch him in time, so Heart finally accepts him as his son and promises to live together, and they leave the plains to find their new home. Meanwhile, Baku meets with Bekon, who says that Heart looks like Baku at his age. When Bekon begins to talk about Baku's lost egg, Baku says that that matter belongs to the past.

Months later, Heart and Umasou (who has grown slightly bigger) have moved to a beach. Heart falls from a cliff and into the ocean, where he is saved by a female Elasmosaurus called Pero Pero. Pero Pero doesn't know at first that Heart is a carnivore, until the two are attacked by a Tylosaurus, which Heart kills by ripping off one of its flippers. Heart promises to never hurt Pero Pero. After Pero Pero tells Heart that Egg Mountain is having high volcanic activity, he and Umasou go to save their family. On the way, as they cross Baku's territory again, their first obstacle is Gonza, who wants to get revenge for everything that Heart did to him, and declares that he won't let them pass until he's dead. The two have a very short fight, in which Heart wins by ripping a chunk off of Gonza's neck. As he lays dying, Gonza ridicules the fact that Umasou is Heart's son, telling Umasou that Heart is not his father. Umasou says that he knew this, but still considers Heart his dad, which moves Heart. Gonza tries to apologise, but finally succumb to his wound. When Heart reaches Light's herd, his brother informs him that their mom doesn't live with the herd all the time and that she is probably in their former home in the forest. He didn't look for her because of his job in the herd as guardian. However, the herd is too afraid of the volcano to move. Heart starts to scare away all the Maiasaura to move to safety. After clearing the second obstacle, Heart rushes to encounter his mother, who is relieved and warm-hearted upon finding her lost son.

After apologizing to her for leaving so suddenly when he was young, Heart introduces Umasou, and meets his new siblings, a girl and two male twins. After the warm reunion, all the family, including Light, head away from the mountain, whose eruption was strong enough to blast the egg rock from the volcano. They almost escape from the eruption, but Baku appears from the volcanic dust and threatens to kill Heart since he disobeyed his order of exile. In order to protect his family, Heart accepts a duel with Baku, in which Baku uses normal Tyrannosaur attacks and movements and Heart displays quick martial arts kicks. In the midst of the battle, Heart bites Baku's neck, which proves to be a great mistake when Baku grabs Heart, leaps, and smashes him with all his weight to crush him, almost killing him. Heart's mother pleads to spare him, revealing that she is his adoptive mother. This makes Baku wonder what she would do if Heart was starving, to which she responds that she would let him eat her, which Baku considers nonsense. He explains that a carnivore has to eat meat every day in order to survive. At the same time, he accepts that Heart wouldn't have survived without her help, so he agrees to spare Heart and the others. As Baku lies down to recover from his wounds from the battle, he tells Heart to be strong and good.

In the aftermath, Heart's mom asks him if he will live with them when they reach their new home. He refuses, saying that it would be better for everyone to stay with their own species, but also says that he enjoyed being her son. The family say goodbye before Heart and Umasou go on their way again. During the end credits, the Maiasaura herd move on to a new home. Baku returns to the plains and Bekon welcomes him back. The movie ends with Heart and Umasou watching the egg rock of Egg Mountain fly away to outer space.

== Series works ==
- You look delicious
  - Released March 2003 ISBN 9784591076439
  - (Large picture book) Released in April 2006 ISBN 9784591092620
- I am a Tyrannosaurus
  - Released January 2004 ISBN 9784591079256
- You are really wonderful
  - Released September 2004 ISBN 9784591082409
- I love you forever
  - Released January 2006 ISBN 9784591089842
- Please give me that love too
  - Released October 2006 ISBN 9784591094440
- I Love You
  - Released June 2007 ISBN 9784591098011
- Thank you for loving me
  - Released December 2008 ISBN 9784591105665
- I'm really glad we met.
  - Released November 2009 ISBN 9784591112199
- The one who is loved the most is me
  - Released September 2010 ISBN 9784591120422
- I believe
  - Released June 2011 ISBN 9784591124611
- We'll be together forever and ever
  - Released June 2012 ISBN 9784591129494
- Loving and being loved
  - Released September 2013 ISBN 9784591135679
- Kindness and compassion
  - Released March 2015ISBN 9784591144329
- Hehehehehe looks delicious
  - Released in September 2017 ISBN 978-4-591-15488-5
- The stars were shining brightly.
  - Released October 2018ISBN 9784591160220
- Goodbye Umasou
  - Released December 2023ISBN 9784591180020

== Cast ==
- Tomoyo Harada as Mother
- Kato Seishiro as Umasou
- Kappei Yamaguchi as Heart
  - Rikako Aikawa as Heart (Young)
- Tokuyoshi Kawashima as Light
  - Fumiko Orikasa as Light (Young)
- Takuya Kirimoto as Gonza
- Maria Kawamura as Pero Pero
- Minoru Yada as Beckon
- Tetsuya Bessho as Baku

== Animated adaptation ==
Miyanishi Tatsuya Gekijō: Omae Umasou da na, the anime series, aired on TV Tokyo beginning on October 4, 2010, to October 29, 2010. The film opened in Japan on October 16, 2010. Discotek Media released Heart and Yummie as a limited edition Blu-ray collection with only 2,000 copies total. It includes both the movies and television anime shorts in Japanese with English subtitles.

== Dinosaurs and other prehistoric reptiles featured ==
- Achillobator (two individuals chased by Heart)
- Alamosaurus (cameo)
- Ankylosaurus (Umasou)
- Archelon (cameo)
- Avisaurus (background only)
- Camarasaurus (skull only)
- Chilantaisaurus (the purple horned carnivore, species implied in the second episode of the animated series)
- Elasmosaurus (Pero Pero)
- Giganotosaurus (seen only in Baku's backstory, referred to as "gluttonous long-necks from the south")
- Maiasaura (Light, Heart and Light's mother, among others)
- Ornithocheirus (background only, one is seen in the beach scene dropping a red berry)
- Ornithomimus (background only)
- Parasaurolophus (background only, one is killed by Heart)
- Protoceratops (seen fleeing from Heart, one is killed and eaten)
- Pteranodon (background only)
- Spinosaurus (Mesomeso)
- Titanosaurus (the sauropod herd Heart defeats)
- Triceratops (one battles Gonza's pack and is killed by Baku, others appear in the background)
- Troodon (the flock of maniraptorans that raid the Maiasaura nesting grounds)
- Tylosaurus (fights Heart and is killed)
- Tyrannosaurus (Heart, Baku, Gonza, Bekon, among others)
- Velociraptor (burnt corpse seen during eruption)
- prehistoric mammal (most likely Cimolestes)
- fictiotis sloth liked Therizinosauridae
- several neornithes
- corpse of a narrow-snouted theropod, possibly a Baryonyx

== Stage ==
The play, titled You Look Delicious, was performed at five locations nationwide starting at Kameari Lirio Hall in October 2024, with a national tour planned for 2025. The plays to be performed are You Look Delicious and You're Really Wonderful.

=== Performance Schedule (Stage) ===
2024

- October 5th - October 6th, Kameari Lirio Hall, Tokyo
- October 12th, Minoh Municipal Cultural and Performing Arts Theater, Osaka
- October 13th, Kobe Asahi Hall, Hyogo
- December 1st, Kumamoto Castle Hall, Kumamoto
- December 21st, Gunma, Mikihi Kiryu Cultural Center
- December 22nd, Oyama City Cultural Center, Tochigi

=== Cast (stage) ===
Voice Cast

- Tyrannosaurus - Kento Ito
- Umasou - Yuko Mori
- Elasmosaurus - Shotaro Uzawa

others

=== Staff (stage) ===
- Original story: Tatsuya Miyanishi / Poplar Publishing
- Screenplay, lyrics and direction: Aki Sakaguchi ( all staff )
- Music: Kazune Tanaka
- Art: Tomoyuki Ikeda
- Sound: Kaerimacho Yoshiyasu (Cambit)
- Lighting: Kumiko Akutagawa (Lightship)
- Costume: Yoko Fujimura
- Video: Urashima Kei (Colore)
- Doll production: Yoshiko Kashima ( Kokutsu no Ki )
- Staging: Tomoka Fujita
- Stage director: Tomoyuki Izumi
- Planning and production: Kyodo Factory
- Production: All Staff

== Reception ==
Freelance writer Riley Black said in a Smithsonian article that the film was one of the strangest and "most adorable" dinosaur films she has seen.

== See also ==
- List of films featuring dinosaurs
