= Namdev Bhau: In Search of Silence =

- Directed by: Dar Gai
- Written by: Dar Gai; Kanishq Banka; Dheer Momaya
- Produced by: Dheer Momaya; Dar Gai
- Starring: Namdev Gurav
- Cinematography: Aditya Varma
- Edited by: Shounok Ghosh
- Music by: Andrea Guerra
- Release date: 5 October 2018 (23rd Busan International Film Festival)
- Country: India
- Languages: Marathi; Hindi

Namdev Bhau: In Search of Silence is a 2018 Indian adventure drama film directed by Dar Gai's Jugaad Motion Pictures and starring Namdev Gurav, a chauffeur in real life, in the title role. The film contains Hindi and Marathi dialogues and was released with Hindi subtitles.

== Synopsis ==
A 65-year-old chauffeur who travels from Mumbai to Ladakh in search of inner peace and quietude.

== Cast ==
- Namdev Gurav as Namdev Bhau
- Aarya Dave as Aaliq
- Zoya Hussain as Tara
- Geetanjali Naik as Namdev's wife

== Production ==
Namdev Gurav, a driver for forty-five years, was signed to play a chauffeur in the film. The film was shot in Bombay and Ladakh.

== Release ==
Namdev Bhau was featured as the opening film for the Dharamshala International Film Festival. The film was also featured at the Busan International Film Festival.

=== Reception ===
The Hollywood Reporter wrote that "Written and directed by the young Kiev-born, India-based Dar Gai, the film builds slowly but inexorably to a touching surprise ending that exceeds expectations". Firstpost wrote that "Namdev Bhau's organic and unschooled performance and Dar Gai's gentle observation of this man who reveals so much while saying so little are the film's soul. Namdev Bhau: In Search of Silence will resonate with residents of big cities who endure daily sensory overload".

== Awards and nominations ==
Year	Award	Category	Nominee	Outcome	Ref.
2019	Indian Film Festival of Melbourne	Best Actor	Namdev Gurav	Nominated	
2019	Indian Film Festival of Melbourne	Best Indie Film	Namdev Bhau: In Search of Silence	Nominated	
