= Nobody Knows (TV series) =

2020 South Korean television series

- Promotional poster
- Hangul: 아무도 모른다
- RR: Amudo moreunda
- MR: Amudo morŭnda
- Genre: Crime; Mystery; Melodrama
- Written by: Kim Eun-hyang
- Directed by: Lee Jeong-heum
- Starring: Kim Seo-hyung; Ryu Deok-hwan; Park Hoon; Ahn Ji-ho
- Country of origin: South Korea
- Original language: Korean
- No. of episodes: 16

Production
- Running time: 70 minutes

Original release
- Network: SBS TV
- Release: March 2 – April 21, 2020

Nobody Knows (Korean: 아무도 모른다; RR: Amudo moreunda) is a 2020 South Korean television series starring Kim Seo-hyung, Ryu Deok-hwan, Park Hoon and Ahn Ji-ho. It aired on SBS TV from March 2 to April 21, 2020.

Ahead of the premiere, a webtoon depicting why the series' main character, Cha Young-jin (Kim Seo-hyung), became a detective was released on KakaoPage.

== Synopsis ==
Still haunted by the death of her friend who was murdered 19 years ago by the infamous Stigmata serial killer, detective Cha Young-jin (Kim Seo-hyung) is determined to catch the culprit.

She is soon joined by school teacher Lee Sun-woo (Ryu Deok-hwan), and they do their best to protect the youth at risk, whose lives could have been changed if they had been surrounded by good adults. One such youth is Go Eun-ho (Ahn Ji-ho), a sixteen-year-old boy who lives in the same apartment block as detective Cha Young-jin, and who seeks her friendship to avoid a traumatic home life. The school he attends, where also Lee Sun-woo is a teacher, has close connections to a church and religious cult, and following a single act, saving the life of an old man (Kwon Hae-hyo) who collapsed in the street, he finds himself drawn into a web of intrigue, corruption and murder.

== Cast ==
=== Main ===
- Kim Seo-hyung as Cha Young-jin
  - Kim Sae-ron as young Cha Young-jin
- Ryu Deok-hwan as Lee Sun-woo
- Park Hoon as Baek Sang-ho
- Ahn Ji-ho as Go Eun-ho

=== Supporting ===
==== Seoul Metropolitan Police Agency ====
- Moon Sung-keun as Hwang In-beom
- Min Jin-woong as Lee Jae-hong
- Kang Ye-won as Yoon Ja-young
- Jun Suk-chan as Kim Byung-hee
- Baek Soo-jang as Park Jin-soo
- Park Chul-min as Han Geun-man

==== New Life Church ====
- Kang Shin-il as Seo Sang-won
- Kwon Hae-hyo as Jang Ki-ho
- Baek Hyun-joo as Im Hee-jung
- Jeon Moo-song as Kwon Jae-chun

==== Shinsung Middle School ====
- Jo Han-chul as Yoon Hee-seob
- Yoon Chan-young as Joo Dong-myung
- Yoon Jae-yong as Ha Min-sung

==== Baek Sang-ho's people ====
- Seo Young-joo as Kim Tae-hyung
- Shin Jae-hwi as Oh Doo-seok
- Tae Won-seok as Go Hee-dong
- Park Min-jung as Bae Sun-ah

==== Others ====
- Choi Go as Joo Han-sol
- Ahn Mi-na as Lee Sun-kyung
- Jang Young-nam as Jeong So-yeon
- Han Soo-hyun as Kim Chang-soo
- Seo Yi-sook as Soo-jung's mother
- Kim Nam-kyoon as a detective
- Kim Si-eun as Choi Soo-jung
- Ham Sung-min as Lee Young-shik's friend
- Lee Joo-young as Min-sung's mother
- Jang Jae-ho as Choi Dae-hoon
- Min Sung-wook as Kevin Jung
- Ryu Sung-rok as Lee Young-shik

== Original soundtrack ==
Nobody Knows OST

Soundtrack album by Various Artists
- Released: 2020
- Genre: Soundtrack
- Languages: Korean; English
- Labels: Vlending Co., Ltd.

=== Part 1 ===
Released on March 9, 2020
No.	Title	Lyrics	Music	Artist	Length
1.	"Embrace" (온기 (Note: Lit. "Warmth"))	OneTop	OneTop	Sunwoo Jung-a	3:46
2.	"Embrace" (Inst.)		OneTop		3:46
Total length:					7:32

=== Part 2 ===
Released on March 10, 2020
No.	Title	Lyrics	Music	Artist	Length
1.	"Happiness"	Major League	Major League	Saay	4:18
2.	"Happiness" (Inst.)		Major League		4:18
Total length:					8:36

=== Part 3 ===
Released on March 16, 2020
No.	Title	Lyrics	Music	Artist	Length
1.	"The Secret Not Revealed" (누구도 풀지 않는 비밀)	Shoon	Shoon	Richard Parkers	3:21
2.	"The Secret Not Revealed" (Inst.)		Shoon		3:21
Total length:					6:42

=== Part 4 ===
Released on March 17, 2020
No.	Title	Lyrics	Music	Artist	Length
1.	"Lost"	ZigZag Note; Kang Myung-shin	ZigZag Note; Kang Myung-shin	Kim Jong-wan (Nell)	4:02
2.	"Lost" (Inst.)		ZigZag Note; Kang Myung-shin		4:02
Total length:					8:04

=== Part 5 ===
Released on April 6, 2020
No.	Title	Lyrics	Music	Artist	Length
1.	"Even If Nobody Cares For You" (아무도 찾지 않더라도)	SE O; Park Se-joon	SE O; Park Se-joon	SE O	3:21
2.	"Even If Nobody Cares For You" (Inst.)		SE O; Park Se-joon		3:21
Total length:					6:42

== Viewership ==
Nobody Knows : South Korea viewers per episode (millions)

Season	Episode number																Average
Season	1	2	3	4	5	6	7	8	9	10	11	12	13	14	15	16	Average
1	1.593	1.437	1.607	1.561	1.709	1.523	1.714	1.710	1.565	1.645	1.603	1.649	1.667	1.822	1.659	1.860	1.645

Source: Audience measurement performed nationwide by Nielsen Korea.

Average TV viewership ratings
Ep.	Part	Original broadcast date	Average audience share		
Ep.	Part	Original broadcast date	Nielsen Korea		TNmS
Ep.	Part	Original broadcast date	Nationwide	Seoul	Nationwide
1	1	March 2, 2020	6.6% (16th)	6.9% (17th)	6.7% (16th)
1	2	March 2, 2020	9.0% (5th)	9.6% (4th)	8.9% (11th)
2	1	March 3, 2020	7.1% (11th)	8.1% (8th)	6.6% (16th)
2	2	March 3, 2020	8.8% (7th)	9.6% (4th)	8.0% (11th)
3	1	March 9, 2020	7.1% (14th)	7.8% (11th)	6.3% (19th)
3	2	March 9, 2020	9.3% (7th)	10.0% (4th)	7.9% (13th)
4	1	March 10, 2020	7.8% (10th)	8.2% (7th)	7.3% (13th)
4	2	March 10, 2020	9.5% (6th)	10.2% (5th)	8.8% (11th)
5	1	March 16, 2020	7.5% (14th)	7.9% (15th)	6.8% (16th)
5	2	March 16, 2020	9.8% (5th)	10.5% (4th)	7.9% (13th)
6	1	March 17, 2020	7.6% (11th)	8.4% (7th)	6.6% (15th)
6	2	March 17, 2020	9.1% (5th)	9.5% (4th)	7.5% (11th)
7	1	March 23, 2020	6.8% (16th)	7.4% (14th)	6.2% (NR)
7	2	March 23, 2020	9.1% (8th)	9.5% (6th)	7.7% (11th)
8	1	March 24, 2020	7.2% (11th)	7.5% (10th)	7.1% (13th)
8	2	March 24, 2020	9.8% (5th)	10.5% (4th)	8.8% (10th)
9	1	March 30, 2020	7.0% (16th)	7.5% (16th)	6.5% (18th)
9	2	March 30, 2020	9.0% (7th)	9.3% (6th)	8.4% (11th)
10	1	March 31, 2020	7.0% (11th)	7.3% (9th)	6.1% (17th)
10	2	March 31, 2020	9.6% (4th)	10.1% (4th)	9.0% (8th)
11	1	April 6, 2020	7.4% (14th)	7.8% (11th)	6.9% (13th)
11	2	April 6, 2020	9.2% (5th)	9.5% (5th)	8.7% (9th)
12	1	April 7, 2020	8.1% (9th)	8.7% (5th)	7.9% (10th)
12	2	April 7, 2020	9.7% (4th)	10.4% (4th)	8.9% (9th)
13	1	April 13, 2020	7.9% (12th)	8.8% (6th)	7.9% (12th)
13	2	April 13, 2020	9.9% (5th)	11.1% (3rd)	—N/a
14	1	April 14, 2020	8.6% (7th)	9.5% (5th)	7.2% (12th)
14	2	April 14, 2020	10.5% (4th)	11.2% (4th)	8.6% (10th)
15	1	April 20, 2020	8.1% (8th)	8.8% (7th)	7.2% (14th)
15	2	April 20, 2020	10.0% (6th)	10.8% (4th)	8.8% (11th)
16	1	April 21, 2020	8.8% (8th)	9.8% (5th)	7.9% (11th)
16	2	April 21, 2020	11.4% (4th)	12.0% (3rd)	9.6% (8th)
Average			8.6%	9.2%	— (Note: Due to some ratings not recorded, the exact average rating is unknown.)
In the table above, the blue numbers represent the lowest ratings and the red numbers represent the highest ratings.; NR denotes that the drama did not rank in the top 20 daily programs on that date.; N/A denotes that the rating is not known.

== Awards and nominations ==
Year	Award	Category	Nominee	Result	Ref.
2020	SBS Drama Awards	Top Excellence Award, Actor in a Miniseries Genre/Action Drama	Ryu Deok-hwan	Nominated	
2020	SBS Drama Awards	Top Excellence Award, Actress in a Miniseries Genre/Action Drama	Kim Seo-hyung	Won	
2020	SBS Drama Awards	Excellence Award, Actor in a Miniseries Genre/Action Drama	Park Hoon	Nominated	
2020	SBS Drama Awards	Excellence Award, Actress in a Miniseries Genre/Action Drama	Jang Young-nam	Nominated	
2020	SBS Drama Awards	Best Young Actor	Ahn Ji-ho	Won	
