= Lavrenti Son =

Korean Kazakhstani writer (born 1941)

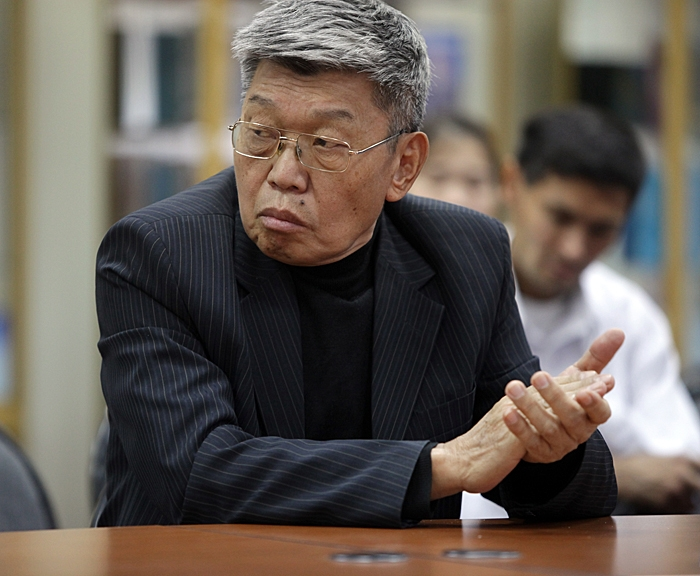

Lavrenti Dyadyunovich Son (Russian: Лаврентий Дядюнович Сон; born February 2, 1941) is a Koryo-saram playwright, author of short stories, and founder of Song Cinema, a documentary company producing movies about the minority ethnicities of the former USSR. His play Memory (기억), about the deportation of Koreans in the Soviet Union, is one of the few plays to ever be written in Koryo-mar. It was first performed by the Korean Theatre of Kazakhstan in 1997.
