= The Red Phallus =

2018 Bhutanese film directed by Tashi Gyeltshen

- Directed by: Tashi Gyeltshen
- Written by: Tashi Gyeltshen
- Produced by: Tashi Gyeltshen; Kristina Konrad; Ram Krishna Pokharel
- Starring: Tshering Euden; Singye; Dorji Gyeltshen; Choten Wangchuk
- Cinematography: Jigme T. Tenzing
- Edited by: Saman Alvitigala
- Music by: Jigme Drukpa; Frances-Marie Uitti
- Production companies: Studio 108; Zoom Out Productions; Icefall Productions; Welt films
- Distributed by: Asian Shadows
- Release date: 6 October 2018 (Busan International Film Festival)
- Running time: 82 minutes
- Countries: Bhutan; Germany; Nepal
- Language: Dzongkha

The Red Phallus is a 2018 Bhutanese Dzongkha-language drama film written and directed by Tashi Gyeltshen.

== Plot ==
Sangay (Tshering Euden) is a 16-year-old high school student living with her widowed and controlling father Ap Atsara (Dorji Gyeltshen), who entertains people in the bazaar by playing the character of Atsara — a sacred character in various festivals — and also carves wooden phalli for various rituals. Sangay is bullied in school, partially for her father's profession. Sangay is having an affair with a married man named Passa (Singye) whose occupation as a butcher means his status in the society is very low. Passa is initially kind to Sangay, but he eventually starts to berate her when she hesitates to run away to the capital city, Thimphu, with him. Sangay is withdrawn and depressed, she is fed up with phalli, school and life. She does not study well and is four years behind her peers. The psychologist calls Sangay's father Atsara to school and tells him to separate Sangay and her lover. Atsara quarrels with Passa and almost kills him. Sangay wants to leave, but he can't mentally. The butcher then rapes Sangay during their meeting. Then she endures humiliation from him for a long time and then kills him with a board. Arriving home, when her father was not at home, she smashes all the wooden phalli and then kills herself. It can be seen that the phalli are dripping with blood.

== Release and reception ==
The film was shown in several international film festivals. Tashi Gyeltshen decided not to release the film in Bhutan after Bhutan's censor board cut 12 minutes of the film. The film was picked up by Asian Shadows for international distribution.

=== Critical reception ===
Variety critic Richard Kuipers said that "[t]hough a tad slow at times, "Phallus" leaves a lasting impression". He also praised Tshering Euden's performance as the lead character. Writing for The Hollywood Reporter, Clarence Tsui described the film as a "taut and gripping debut." Davide Abbatescianni of Cineuropa criticized the performance of the male leads, character development and the rhythm of the narration but praised the sound design and "visual rigour" of the film. Alexander Knoth of Asian Movie Pulse praises the film as a "courageous feature mastering a gritty atmosphere" and the crew, writing "[t]he whole crew did an amazing job capturing the feeling of the environment and turning it into a metaphor for the cruel interpersonal proceedings that take place." In his review of the film for Eastern Kicks, Andrew Heskins gave it three out of five stars, calling it "[a]chingly beautiful but equally as slow".

=== Accolades ===
The film won the FIPRESCI award at the 23rd Busan International Film Festival and was nominated for the 2019 Best International Feature Film in Edinburgh International Film Festival.
