= Kazakhstan–South Korea relations =

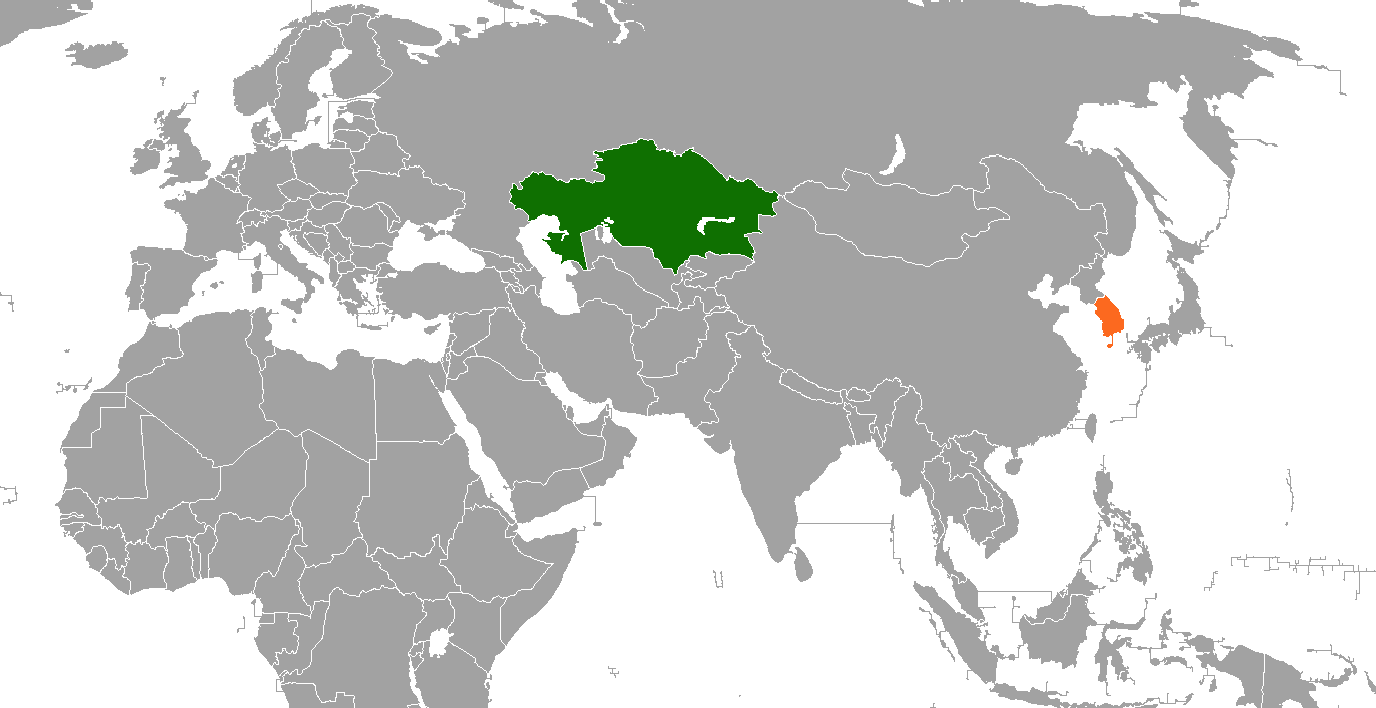

- Kazakhstan: South Korea

Kazakhstan–South Korea relations are the international relations between Kazakhstan and the South Korea.

Diplomatic relations between the two countries were established on January 28, 1992, shortly after Kazakhstan's independence. Bilateral relations have grown steadily since that time. Cooperation between the two nations has grown in political, economic, and educational spheres.

== History ==
=== Koryo-saram ===
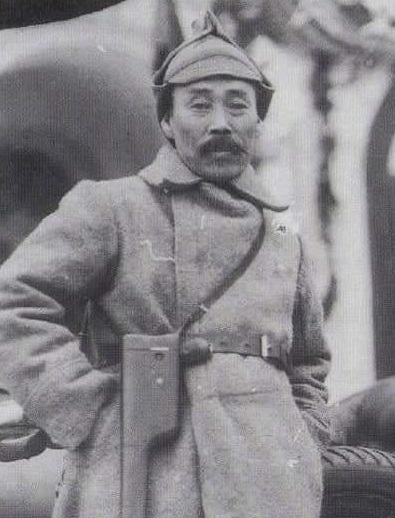
One of well-known Koryo-saram who was forced to moved by the Soviet Union was Hong Beom-do.

In the late 1930s thousands of Koreans in the Soviet Union were deported to Central Asia, supposedly to prevent further Japanese espionage. These people are now known as Koryo-saram(Korean: 고려인). It is estimated that more than 120,000 ethnic Koreans (known as Koryo-saram) still live in the territory of Kazakhstan. The presence of these ethnic Koreans helps to strengthen ties between the two countries. Hong Beom-do, Korean independence activist, was also forced and moved to Kazakhstan, where he spent rest of his life. His memorial tomb was located in Kyzylorda until 2021, and his remains were returned to his home country, South Korea. He was buried at Daejeon National Cemetery where martyrs and heroes rest in peace.

=== Modern relations ===
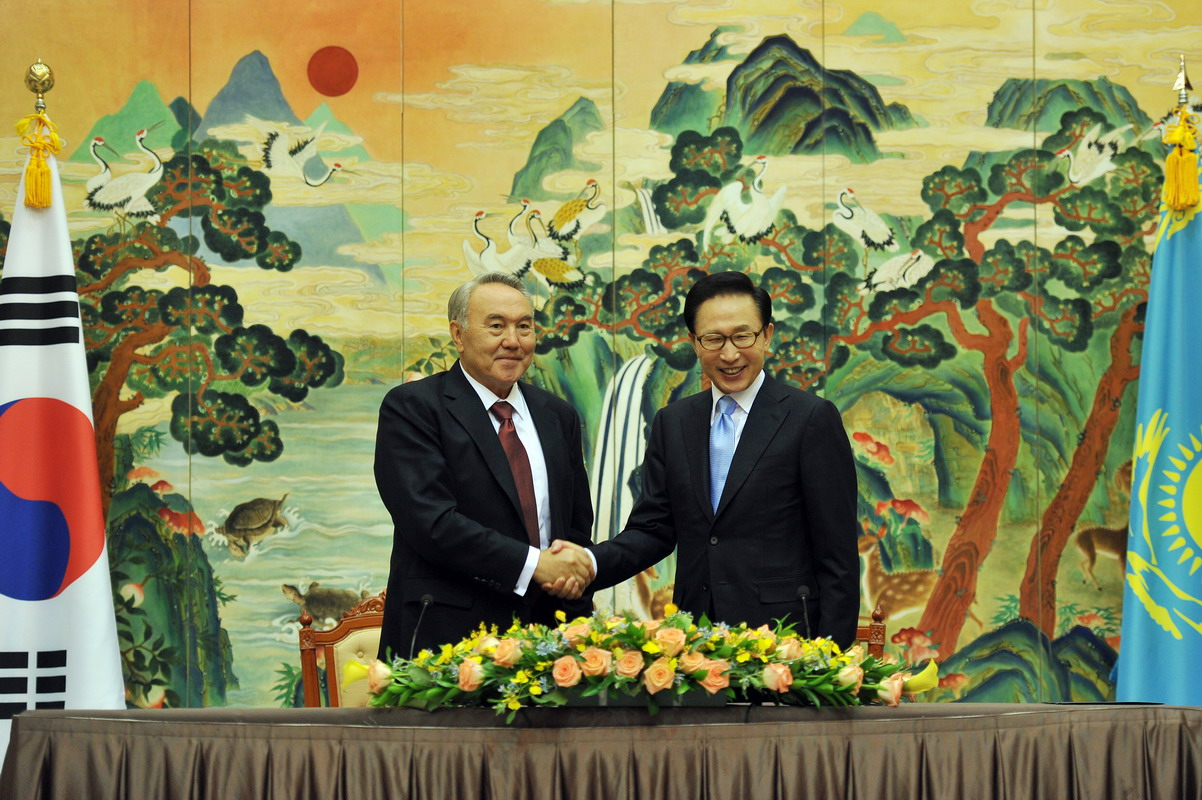
Visit of Nazarbayev to South Korea, 2010

South Korea and Kazakhstan formally established diplomatic relations in January 1992. Soon thereafter South Korea opened its embassy in Almaty, and in 1996 Kazakhstan opened its embassy in Seoul.

Kazakhstani president Nursultan Nazarbayev has made five official visits to South Korea, in 1995, 2003, 2010, 2012, 2016. The first state visit of the President of Kazakhstan, Nursultan Nazarbayev, to South Korea took place from 12 to 14 November 2003. During the meeting between the two presidents, issues related to deepening bilateral cooperation were discussed, and an agreement was reached to elevate relations to a new level of strategic partnership. During the visit, Nursultan Nazarbayev was awarded the title of Honorary Citizen of Seoul.

In 2004, South Korean president Roh Moo Hyun visited Kazakhstan. His successor, Lee Myung-bak, visited Kazakhstan in 2009. President Park Geun-hye visited Kazakhstan in 2014 where she and President Nazarbayev agreed to strengthen economic and investment cooperation and technology exchange. President Moon Jae-In visited Kazakhstan in 2019.

Kazakhstan President Kassym-Jomart Tokayev paid a state visit to S. Korea on 16-17 of August, 2021, and has become first foreign leader to visit South Korea amid pandemic. Low-level officials, including ministers and mayors, make regular visits between the two countries.

South Korea President Yoon Suk Yeol paid a state visit to Kazakhstan on 11-13 of June, 2024, upgrading strategic partnership between the 2 states.

== Economic relations ==
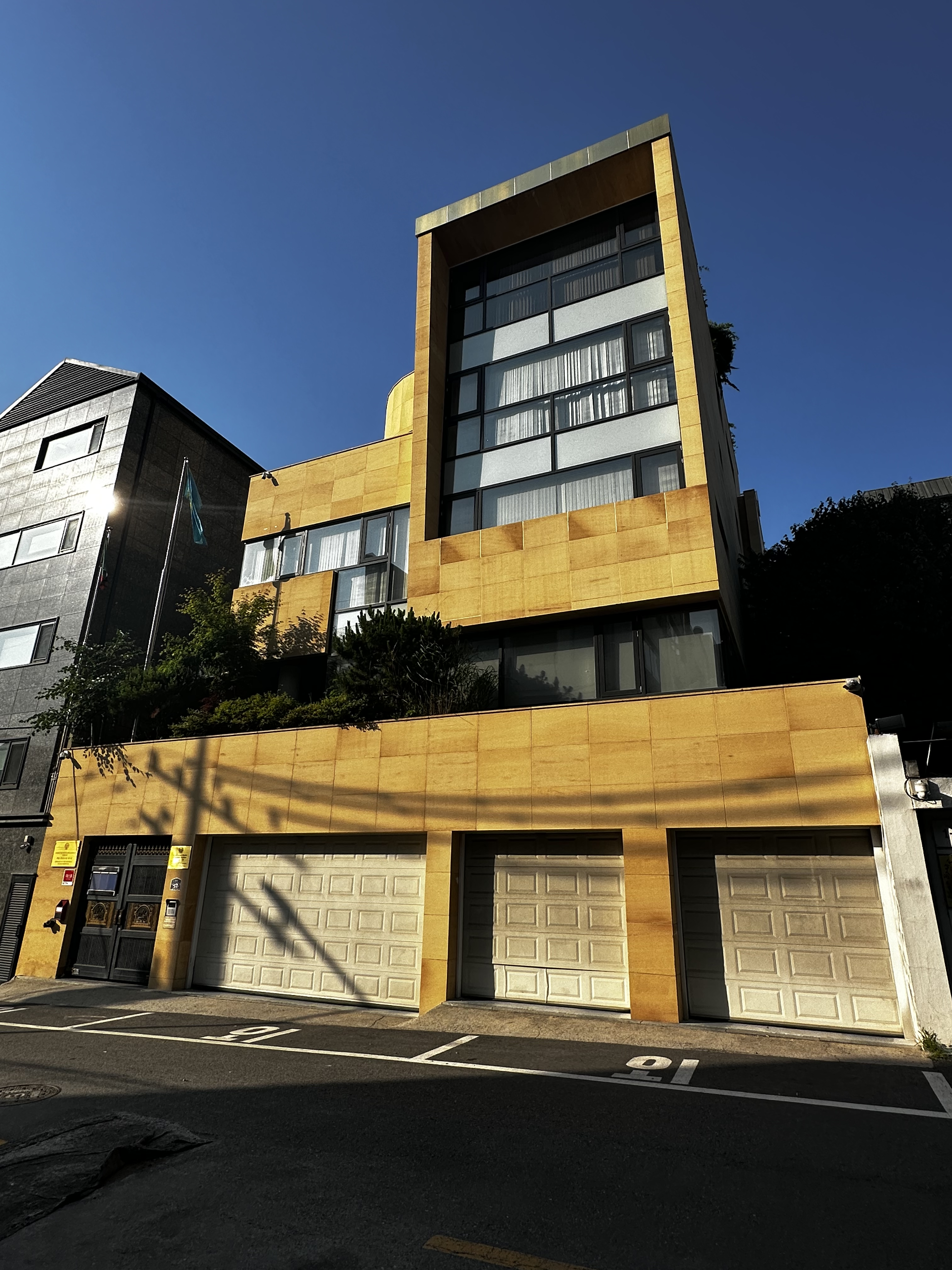
Embassy of the Republic of Kazakhstan to the Republic of Korea

Since independence, South Korea and Kazakhstan have witnessed deepening economics ties, as Kazakhstan has become South Korea's most important trading partner in Central Asia. In 2008, Kookmin Bank, one of South Korea's largest banks, purchased a 30% stake in Kazakhstan's CenterCredit Bank for about $634 million.

Korean companies are also involved in Kazakhstan's oil industry. The Korean Consortium of the Caspian Oil Project, which is led by the Korea National Oil Company and includes SK Corporation, LG International, Samsung, and Daesung Industrial, is involved in the development of the Zhambyl oil field, located in the Caspian Sea. Under the agreement, the consortium will own 27% of drilling rights, with the option to purchase up to 50% of the rights, depending on what is found after further exploration. The field is estimated to hold 1 billion barrels of crude oil.

In May 2009 the two countries signed an agreement for Korean investments in Kazakhstan's energy and technology sectors totaling over $5 billion. The agreement includes a $2.5 billion investment by South Korean companies in a new power plant in southern Kazakhstan. The two companies, Korea Electric Power Corporation and Samsung C&T will own 65% of the plant, which is scheduled for completion by 2014.

South Korean President Park Geun-hye expressed support for the economic development Kazakhstan 2050 Strategy on a 2014 visit to Kazakhstan.

In November 2020, the South Korean embassy in Astana organized a webinar looking at Kazakhstan's approach to voluntary disposing of the 1410 warheads it inherited from the Soviet Union. The two countries also had productive talks during the 13th Central Asia-South Korea Cooperation Forum in Seoul, in which they discussed the consequences and opportunities for economic cooperation in the context of the COVID-19 pandemic, as well as the removal of remaining barriers to trade and improving product quality and competitiveness.

South Korea's major exports to Kazakhstan include automobiles, televisions, and other electronics. Kazakh exports primarily raw materials, including copper and zinc, to South Korea. As of 2024, South Korea is the 5th largest investor and 4th largest trade partner of Kazakhstan. Trade turnover between the two countries amounted to US$6 billion in 2023, and over the past 18 years, the gross inflow of foreign direct investment from Korea to Kazakhstan reached US$9.6 billion.

Korean business is represented quite widely in Kazakhstan. World-famous Korean companies such as Samsung, Hyundai, Kia, Lotte, Doosan, KT, Posco, LG, Shinhan, CU are successfully implementing their projects. In total, about 740 companies with Korean capital operate in Kazakhstan. There are 55 joint projects between the 2 countries. In 2024, a chain of South Korean stores “CU” opened in Kazakhstan. BGF Retail plans to open 500 CU stores in Kazakhstan.

== Cultural/educational relations ==
In 2005 the Association for Kazakhstan Studies in Korea (AKSK) was founded in response to South Korean president Roh's visit to Kazakhstan. The association aims to improve bilateral relations between the two countries as well as improve academic study of the different ethnicities in Kazakhstan.

The oldest Korean-language newspaper outside of the Korean peninsula, Koryo Ilbo, celebrated its 100th anniversary with events both in Kazakhstan and in South Korea.

The Korean Theatre of Kazakhstan, an ethnic theatre for Koryo-saram in Almaty, has served as a cultural link for South Korea and Kazakhstan. The theatre has been visited by prominent South Korean politicians, and in 2023 it served as a venue for a joint South Korean-Kazakh play during a cultural exchange year.

== Tourism ==
According to the results of 2023, the tourist flow from South Korea to Kazakhstan increased by 125%.

The number of Koreans visiting Kazakhstan more than doubled in 2023. In March 20-21, 2024, civil aviation authorities of the 2 countries agreed to increase the number of current flights between Almaty and Seoul from 10 to 42 flights per week. Additionally, starting from June 15, 2024, Air Astana will operate two direct flights a week between Astana and Seoul.

== Ambassadors of Korea in Kazakhstan ==
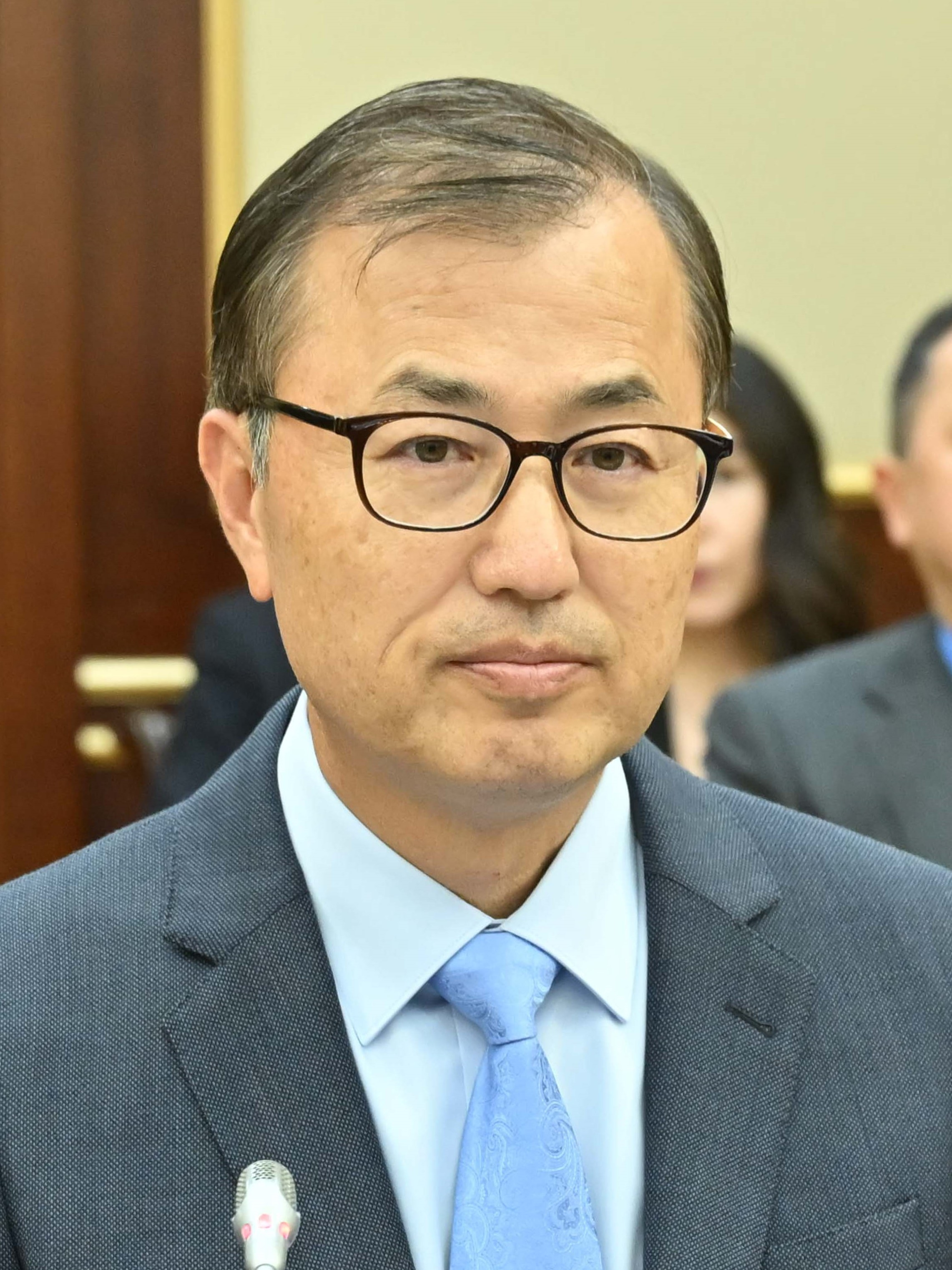
- Ambassador Cho Tae-ik
  (embassy since 1992–1996)
1. Kim Chang Geun 김창근 1993.11
2. Lee Young Min 이영민 1996.10
3. Choi Seung Ho 최승호 1999.11
4. Tae Suk Won 태석원 2002.08
5. Kim Il Soo 김일수 2005.09
6. Lee Byung Hwa 이병화 2009.03
7. Baek Joo Hyun 백주현 2012.04
8. Cho Young Cheon 조용천 2015.10
9. Kim Dae Sik 김대식 2017.04
10. Goo Hung Suk 구홍석 2020.07
11. Cho Tae-ik 조태익 2023.05

== Resident diplomatic missions ==
- Kazakhstan has an embassy in Seoul.
- South Korea has an embassy in Astana.

== See also ==
- Foreign relations of Kazakhstan
- Foreign relations of South Korea
