= Korean Cultural Center, Ussuriysk =

Organization in Primorsky Krai, Russia

Ussuriysk Korean Cultural Center
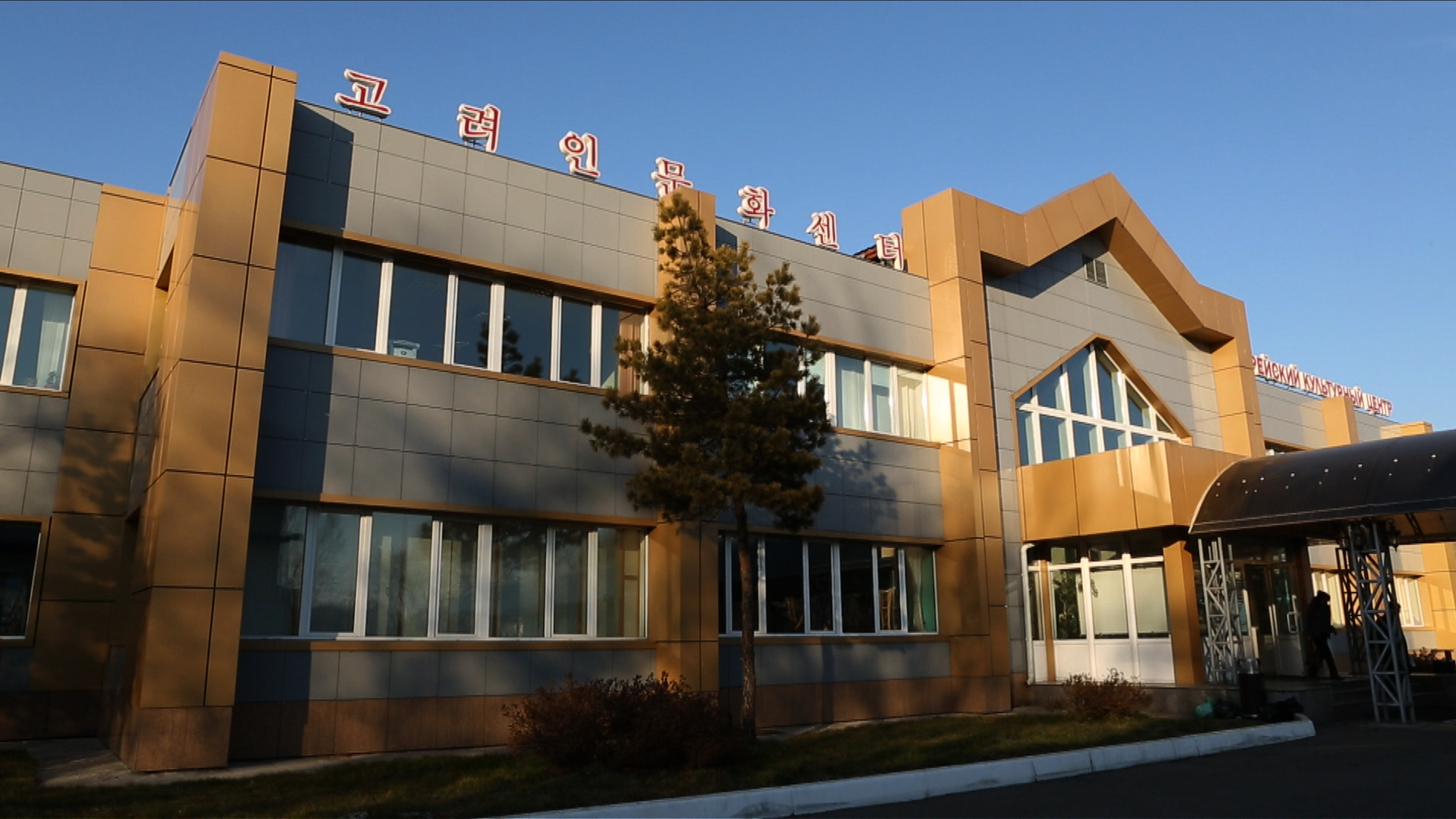
- The building in 2015

General information
- Location: Ussuriysk, Russia
- Coordinates: 43.8065°N 131.9507°E
- Completed: 2009

Technical details
- Floor count: 2
- Floor area: 4,000 m^{2} (43,000 ft^{2})

The Ussuriysk Korean Cultural Center (Russian: Корейский культурный центр, Уссурийск; Korean: 우수리스크 고려인문화센터) is a branch of the South Korean organization Korean Cultural Centers in Ussuriysk, Primorsky Krai, Russia. It was built in 2009, and serves as an activity center for Koryo-saram: ethnic Koreans of the former Soviet Union. It also houses the Maritime Territory Koryo-saram Cultural Association (Национально-культурной автономии корейцев города Уссурийска и Приморского края, 'National-cultural Autonomy of Koreans of the City of Ussuriysk, Primorsky Krai'; 연해주 고려인 민족 문화 자치회).

The building is host to a Museum of the History of Russian Koreans, which covers the history of Koryo-saram.

== Description ==
An Ussuriysk Koryo-saram cultural organization was first established in 1991. Planning for the construction of a building for their activities began in 2004, and was completed by 2009. It has two floors above ground, and a floor area of around 4,000 square meters (43,000 ft^{2}). The history museum was first opened on October 31, 2009. The organization also manages a separate history exhibit at the former house of the Korean independence activist Choi Jae-hyeong (Пётр Семёнович Цой). A monument to another independence activist An Jung-geun also stands outside the building.

The building is now host to a number of cultural activities, including free Korean language classes, a Korean traditional dance group Arirang (named for Arirang, the Korean folk song), and a Korean drum group. A Korean restaurant and library are present on the first floor. A monthly Russian-language newspaper is also published from the building.

The building and organization have become notable for their celebrations of the holiday Chuseok. Their events become so popular with non-Korean residents of the city, that the mayor of Ussuriysk observed in October 2014 that the holiday had become a holiday for the entire city. For their 2023 celebration, on the 160th anniversary of the first arrival of Koreans emigrants to Russia, over a thousand Koryo-saram participated.

On September 6, 2017, the First Lady of South Korea Kim Jung-sook visited the building and participated in several cultural activities.

== Gallery ==
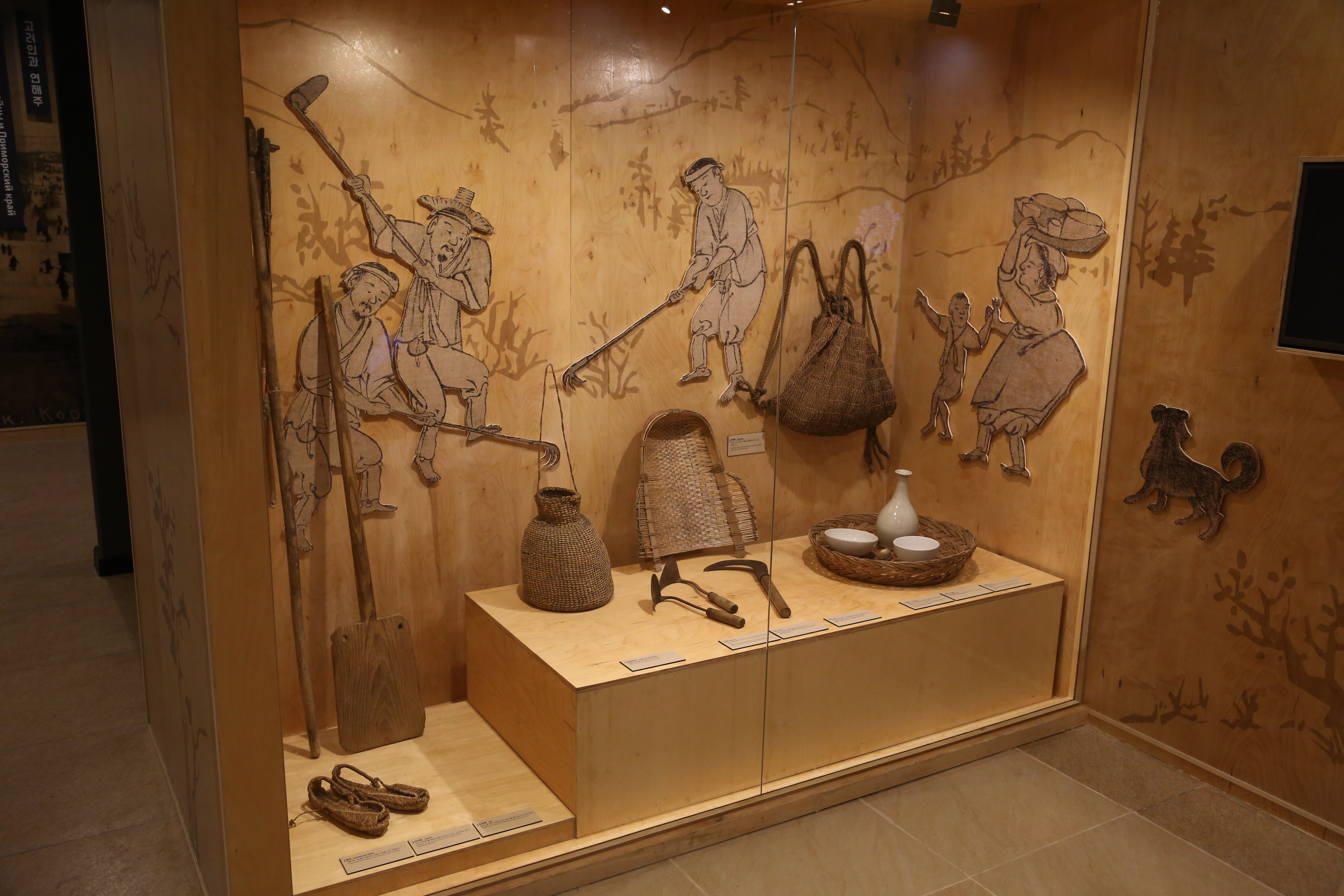
An exhibit in the museum showing various Korean agricultural tools, including a winnowing basket (2016)

== See also ==
- Korean Theatre of Kazakhstan
- Category:Koryo-saram organizations
- Category:Koryo-saram communities
