= Ahn Ji-ho (actor) =

South Korean actor (born 2004)

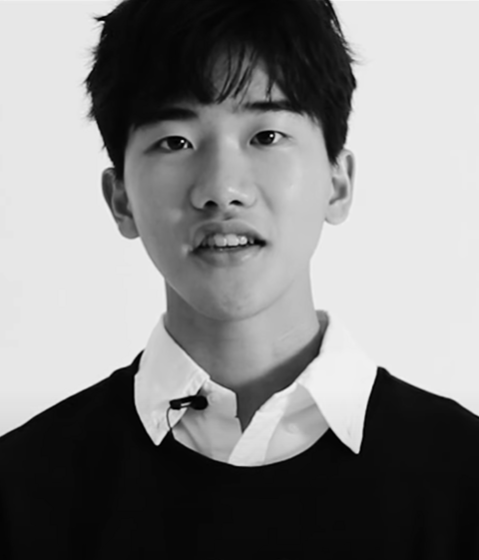
- Ahn in October 2019
- Born: 5 January 2004 (age 22); South Korea
- Occupation: Actor
- Agent(s): CL&Company

Korean name
- Hangul: 안지호
- RR: An Jiho
- MR: An Chiho

Ahn Ji-ho (Korean: 안지호; born January 5, 2004) is a South Korean actor represented by CL&Company. He began his acting career at the age of 10, debuting in the 2014 web series Drawing, Spring. His interest in acting was sparked during a leadership class he took while preparing to run for student council vice-president in primary school.

== Filmography ==
=== Film ===
Year	Title	Role	Ref.
2016	Vanishing Time: A Boy Who Returned	Sang-chul	
2018	The Princess and the Matchmaker	Deok-goo	
2018	Along with the Gods: The Last 49 Days	Haewonmak (young)	
2019	Inseparable Bros	Se-ha (young)	
2019	A Boy and Sungreen	Bo-hee	
2019	The House of Us	Chan	
2023	Rebound	Jung Jin-wook	
2024	Walker (Korean: 검은소년)		

=== Television series ===
Year	Title	Role	Ref.
2020	Nobody Knows	Go Eun-ho	
2021	The Veil	Choi Sang-kyun	
2023	Night Has Come	Jin Da Beom	

=== Web series ===
Year	Title	Role	Ref.
2014	Drawing, Spring	Seo Geun-tae (young)	
2021	Move to Heaven	Han Jung-woo (young)	
2022	All of Us Are Dead	Kim Chul-soo	
2023	Gyeongseong Creature	Park Beom-o	
2024	Begins ≠ Youth	Jeong Ho-su	
2025	Heesu in Class 2	Lee Hee-su	
2025	The Manipulated	Park Tae-jin	

== Awards and nominations ==
Year	Award	Category	Nominated work	Result
2018	Seoul Independent Film Festival	Independent Star Award	A Boy and Sungreen	Won
2020	56th Grand Bell Awards	Best New Actor	A Boy and Sungreen	Nominated
2020	56th Baeksang Arts Awards	Best New Actor	A Boy and Sungreen	Nominated
2020	SBS Drama Awards	Best Young Actor	Nobody Knows	Won
