= A Boy and Sungreen =

2018 film by Ahn Ju-young

- Hangul: 보희와 녹양
- RR: Bohuiwa nogyang
- MR: Pohŭiwa nogyang
- Directed by: Ahn Ju-young
- Screenplay by: Ahn Ju-young
- Produced by: So Jun-beum
- Starring: Ahn Ji-ho; Kim Ju-a; Seo Hyun-woo; Shin Dong-mi
- Cinematography: Lee Seong-yong
- Edited by: Ahn Ju-young
- Music by: Juno Lee
- Release dates: October 11, 2018 (BIFF); May 29, 2019 (South Korea)
- Running time: 99 minutes
- Country: South Korea
- Language: Korean

A Boy and Sungreen (Korean: 보희와 녹양) is a 2018 South Korean drama film written, directed and edited by first-time director Ahn Ju-young. The coming-of-age film stars Ahn Ji-ho, Kim Ju-a, Seo Hyun-woo and Shin Dong-mi. It made its world premiere at the 23rd Busan International Film Festival and won KTH Award.

== Plot ==
Bo-hee (Ahn Ji-ho) is a timid middle school student who struggles with the uncertainties of life. When he finds out that his mother has a boyfriend and that his supposedly-dead father is alive, he sets out to find him with his best friend Nok-yang (Kim Ju-a).

== Cast ==
- Ahn Ji-ho as Bo-hee
- Kim Ju-a as Nok-yang (Sungreen)
- Seo Hyun-woo as Sung-wook
- Shin Dong-mi as Bo-hee's mother

== Awards and nominations ==
Year	Award	Category	Recipient	Result	Ref
2018	23rd Busan International Film Festival	KTH Award	A Boy and Sungreen	Won	
2018	Seoul Independent Film Festival	Independent Star Award	Ahn Ji-ho	Won	
2020	56th Grand Bell Awards	Best New Actor	Ahn Ji-ho	Nominated	
2020	56th Baeksang Arts Awards	Best New Actor	Ahn Ji-ho	Nominated	
