= Joost Vandebrug =

Dutch artist

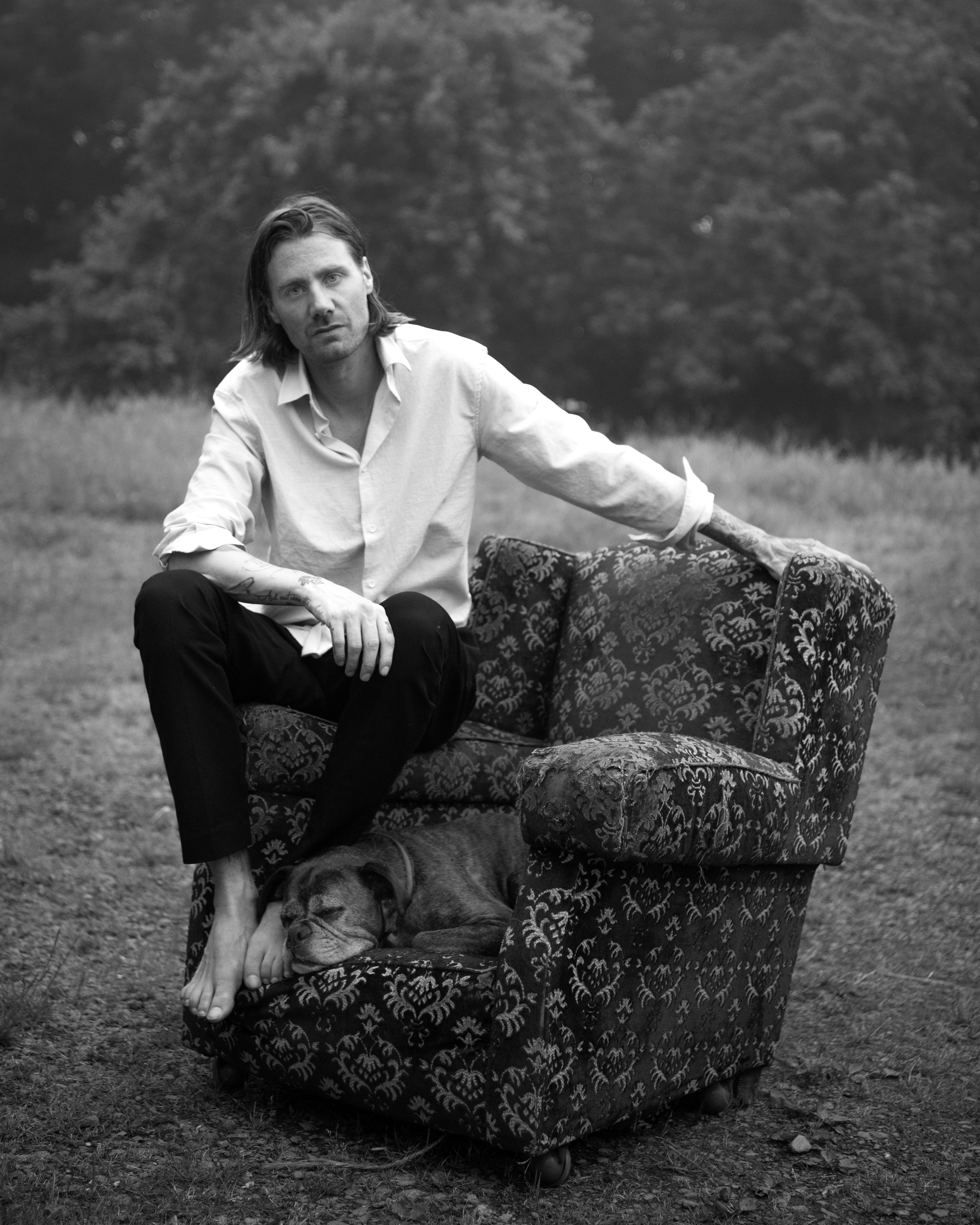
- Born: 24 June 1982 (age 44); Harlingen, Netherlands
- Education: Gerrit Rietveld Academie
- Occupation: Artist

Joost Vandebrug (born 24 June 1982) is a Dutch artist working across photography and film.

== Life and work ==
Vandebrug studied at the Gerrit Rietveld Academie in Amsterdam.

Vandebrug's photo-based works include both conventional and unconventional printing techniques such as pigment transfers and gelatin silver process, both on the hand-made and hand-coated Washi as well as the more traditional Baryte papers. The susceptibility and fragility of the Japanese paper, which often parallels his subject matters, led to Vandebrug's embrace of imperfection and accidents that go against the photographic tradition of producing and preserving unblemished prints.

His documentary film, in which he follows a group of adolescents for 6 years as they inhabit abandoned tunnels in Bucharest, received a 5-star review in The Guardian, and was screened in over 50 film festivals around the world. The film is produced by Grain media and executive producer Noomi Rapace.

== Publications ==
- A Life in Tunnels. 2011. Edition of 200 copies.
- Bruce Lee, Regele Canalelor (Bruce Lee, King of the Tunnels). 2014.
- Cinci Lei. 2014.

== Films ==
- Bruce Lee and the Outlaw (2018) – feature documentary
