= James T. Hong =

James T. Hong (Chinese: 洪子健; pinyin: Hóng Zǐjiàn) is a Taiwanese-American filmmaker and artist whose works tend to focus on philosophical topics and figures, controversial race and class issues, and historical conflicts in Asia.

== Works ==
His films and videos include Behold the Asian: How One Becomes What One Is, Condor: A Film from California, The Form of the Good, Taipei 101: A Travelogue of Symptoms, The Spear of Destiny, Suprematist Kapital, and The Denazification of MH about Martin Heidegger, which is analyzed in the journal Film-Philosophy.

Hong produced the award-winning documentary 731: Two Versions of Hell about Japan's Unit 731 in 2007, which was followed by Lessons of the Blood in 2010.

His 2012 film The Turner Film Diaries is based on the infamous, racist American novel, The Turner Diaries.

He has written for e-flux journal and has been featured in various contemporary art biennials.

In 2016 he released the documentary Terra Nullius or: How to Be a Nationalist, which focuses on disputed territory in the East China Sea.
