= My Tyrano: Together, Forever =

- Korean theatrical release poster
- Directed by: Kōbun Shizuno
- Written by: Dai Satō; Kimiko Ueno; Naohiro Fukushima
- Based on: Tyrannosaurus series by Tatsuya Miyanishi
- Produced by: Kang Sang-wook; Yoshimi Suzuki; Mitsuaki Oishi; Kang Min-ha; Yoshihiro Shimizu
- Starring: Shinichiro Miki; Kaori Ishihara; Aoi Yūki; Toshiyuki Morikawa; Nobuyuki Hiyama
- Cinematography: Toru Shinozaki
- Music by: Ryuichi Sakamoto
- Production company: Tezuka Productions
- Distributed by: Next Entertainment World; Toho
- Release dates: October 5, 2018 (Busan); August 14, 2019 (South Korea); October 5, 2019 (China); December 10, 2021 (Japan)
- Running time: 108 minutes 97 minutes (China version)
- Countries: South Korea; Japan; China
- Languages: Korean; Japanese; Mandarin

My Tyrano: Together, Forever (Japanese: さよなら、ティラノ, Hepburn: Sayonara, Tyranno) is a 2018 Japanese–Korean animated film directed by Kōbun Shizuno. A joint production between South Korea, Japan and China, it is based on the 11th book in Tatsuya Miyanishi's Tyrannosaurus series. It made its world premiere in the Open Cinema section at the 23rd Busan International Film Festival. The scoring of the film is by the prominent Japanese musician Ryuichi Sakamoto.

== Plot ==
The film depicts the friendship of a lonely Tyrannosaurus rex (OKA Ceratosaurus), Tyrano, and the orphaned baby dinosaur Punon as they begin their journey in search for an earthly paradise.

== Cast ==
- Shin-ichiro Miki as Tyrano
- Kaori Ishihara as Punon
- Aoi Yūki as Top
- Toshiyuki Morikawa as Ructo
- Nobuyuki Hiyama as Ruichi
