= Korean Theatre of Kazakhstan =

Ethnic theatre in Almaty, Kazakhstan

Korean Theater of Kazakhstan
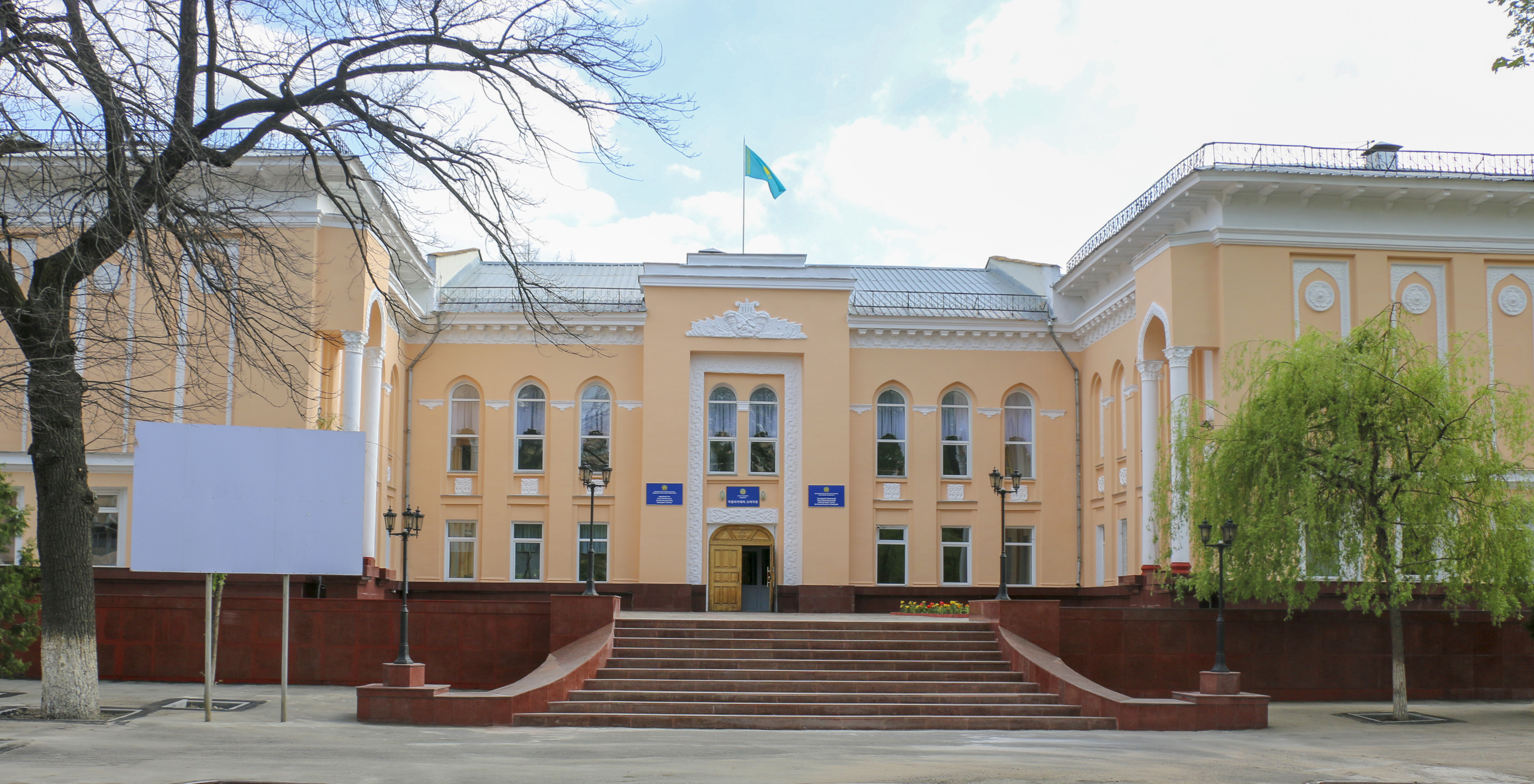
- The theater in 2019

General information
- Location: Bogenbai Batyr Street 158, Almaty, Kazakhstan
- Coordinates: 43.2517°N 76.9314°E
- Opened: September 9, 1932; 94 years ago
- Relocated: December 2003

Website
- koreantheatre.com

The Korean Theatre or Koryo Theatre (Kazakh: Корей Театры, romanized: Korei Teatry; Korean: 고려극장) (Note: Full name: Republican State Academic Korean Theatre of the Republic of Kazakhstan (Russian: Республиканский государственный академический корейский театр Республики Казахстан; Korean: 카자흐스탄공화국 국립 아카데미 고려극장). Also called the State Republican Academic Korean Musical Comedy Theatre and sometimes Goryeo Theatre.) is a national theatre that specializes in the culture of Korea in Almaty, Kazakhstan. It is operated by and associated with the Koryo-saram community: ethnic Koreans of the former Soviet Union. The theatre troupe has operated since 1932, making it the oldest still-running Korean theatre troupe in the world, including in Korea.

It moved to Almaty in 1968, and into its current building in December 2003.

The theatre is a notable cultural hub for Koryo-mar, the dialect of Koryo-saram. All productions are in Korean, with simultaneous translation into Russian.

== Description ==
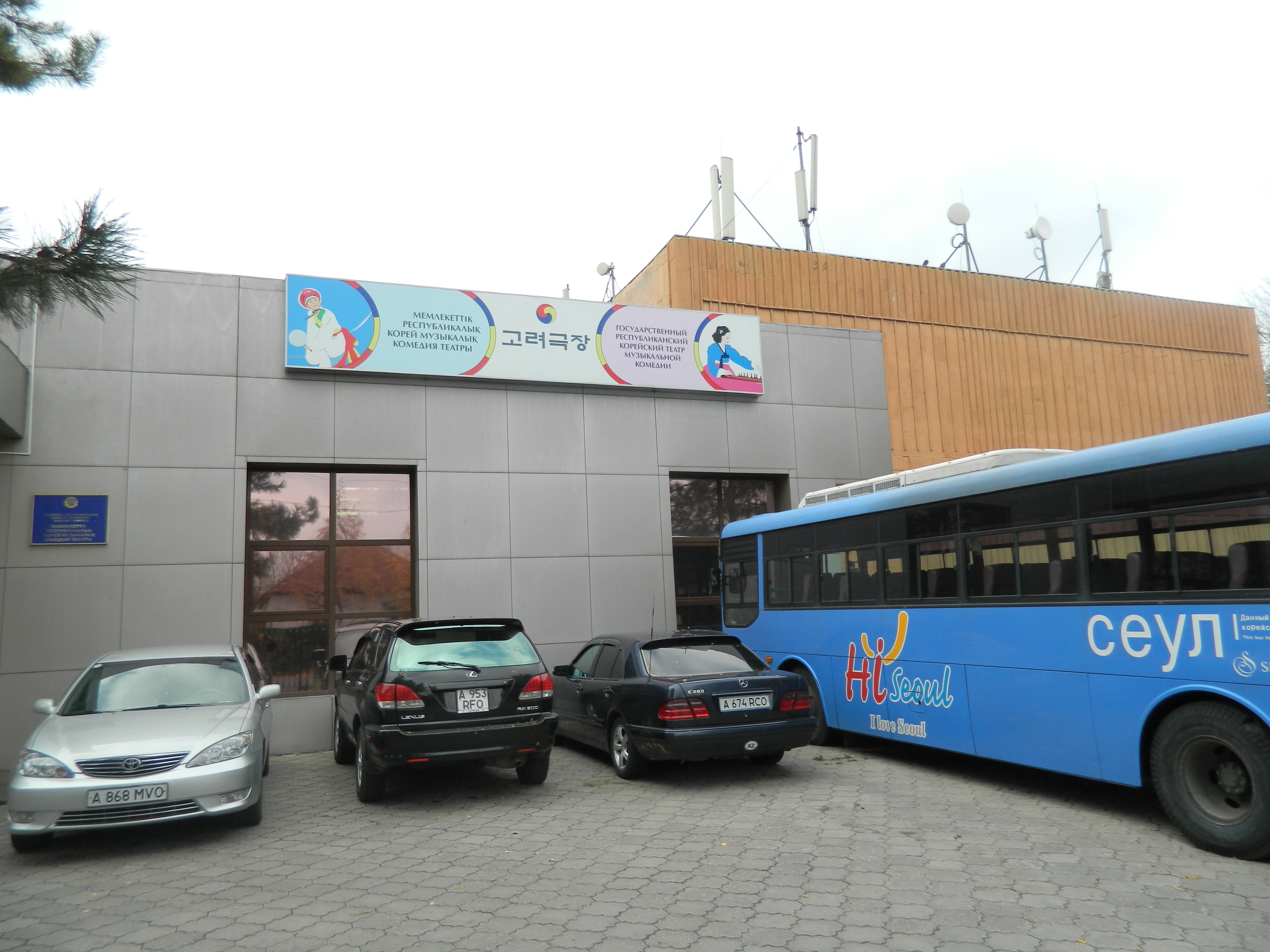
Side view of the theater, with the bus visible (2012)

The theatre is located around 30 minutes from downtown by car. They have a Seoul Metropolitan Government–branded bus used to shuttle audience members that was donated to them by the mayor of Seoul (and later president of South Korea) Lee Myung-bak.

As of 2012, the theatre employed 96 people, around half of whom were performers. A traditional Korean performance was held every Saturday.

Plays cover a variety of topics. Some cover the Korean independence movement against the Empire of Japan, some cover Koryo-saram heroes like Hong Beom-do, and others are more historical or traditional Korean plays.

== History ==
It was originally established on 9 September 1932 as the Far Eastern Krai Korean Theatre (극동지방고려극단; Дальневосточный краевой корейский театр) in Vladivostok, during the 1910–1945 Japanese occupation of Korea. This not only makes it one of the only Korean theatres outside of Korea, it also makes it one of the oldest still-running Korean theatres including even in Korea.

Around the time of its creation, actors were looked down upon by the community. This changed due to Soviet Union norms about all professions being respectable. Art and drama also took up societal positions of prominence under Soviet policies, which led to acting even becoming a desirable role.

In September 1937, the theatre company became divided during the forced deportation of Koreans to Central Asia. One part became the settled in Kyzylorda, Kazakhstan. Another settled in Khorazm, Uzbekistan, and lasted until 1942 before closing. Another opened in 1937 in Tashkent, Uzbekistan (타슈켄트 극단; ташкентской труппой). In 1939, the famous Korean independence activist Hong Beom-do worked as a night watchman in one of the theatres.

The various theatre groups traveled between various Korean communities in the region. One person interviewed in 2012 whose parents were performers during this period recalled that their parents would leave home for six months at a time while performing. If actors were married, often both partners were actors, which led to children being left at home for months, which caused friction in families. As there was little freedom of movement at the time, these traveling performers also served as an important cultural and communication network between the dispersed Korean people in the region. Performers would deliver messages between families and friends in different towns.

In the early years, plays often covered topics relating to the Korean independence movement. For example, they debuted a play about Hong Beom-do in 1942. When Korea was eventually liberated in 1945, fewer plays addressed this topic.

During World War II, the Kyzylorda group moved to Ushtobe in Almaty, and became the Taldykorgan Regional Music and Drama Korean Theatre (탈듸쿠르간 지역 음악 및 드라마 고려극장; Талды-Курганский областной корейский музыкально-драматический театр). In 1950, the Tashkent and Ushtobe groups merged.

The group moved to its current location in Almaty in 1968. Around the time of the Perestroika reform movement, the group began portraying the negative impacts of Soviet policies on Koryo-saram more openly. The group developed a play in 1988 called "1937: The Train of Deportation". It toured North and South Korea in 1989. The theatre experienced economic troubles in the 1990s.

It eventually moved into its current building (formerly a cinema called "Zhalyn") in December 2003, to celebrate its 70th anniversary in 2002. As fewer Koryo-saram speak Korean now, it is reportedly more difficult to recruit actors as of late. However, due to the rise of the Korean Wave in Kazakhstan, there is now significant interest in Korean culture in the country.

On March 11, 2018, the South Korean National Assembly speaker Chung Sye-kyun visited the theatre. He gave a speech to the community there, and watched some of its cultural productions. Later that month, the troupe received an award For Merits in the Development of Culture and Art from the CIS Interparliamentary Assembly. According to the group, by this point the group had over 5 million viewers over its history.

In 2019, South President Moon Jae-in visited the theatre.

The group has been well-received even among non-Koreans. Kim Yelena, director of the theatre in 2023, explained that Koreans were just one of a hundred ethnic groups in Kazakhstan, and that many groups shared the experience of having been forcefully moved to the area.

To mark the 30th anniversary of South Korean-Kazakhstani diplomatic relations, the two countries held a Korea–Kazakhstan Mutual Cultural Exchange Year between 2022 and 2023. The two countries produced a play that opened on September 23 at the Korean Theatre. It is about the deportation of Koryo-saram, as well as about the Korean independence fighter Hong Beom-do. It was consistently sold out after its opening, and was also performed in various locations in South Korea.

== See also ==
- Ussuriysk Korean Cultural Center – a Korean cultural center in Ussuryisk, Russia that also does cultural productions
