= Shadowbox (film) =

2025 Indian film

- Festival release poster
- Directed by: Tanushree Das; Saumyananda Sahi
- Screenplay by: Saumyananda Sahi
- Story by: Tanushree Das
- Produced by: Naren Chandavarkar; Shaunak Sen; Aman Mann; Saumyananda Sahi
- Starring: Tillotama Shome; Chandan Bisht; Sayan Karmakar
- Cinematography: Saumyananda Sahi
- Edited by: Tanushree Das
- Music by: Benedict Taylor; Naren Chandavarkar
- Production companies: Jugaad Motion Pictures; Bridge PostWorks
- Release date: 16 February 2025 (Berlinale)
- Countries: India; France; United States; Spain
- Language: Bengali

Shadowbox (Bengali: Baksho Bondi) is a 2025 Bengali-language drama film co-directed by Tanushree Das and Saumyananda Sahi in their directorial debut. The film starring Tillotama Shome as Maya is set against the backdrop of a dusty Kolkata suburb, and is a powerful narrative of love, resilience, and the quiet strength of a working woman.

It was selected in Perspectives at the 75th Berlin International Film Festival and was screened on 16 February 2025.

== Synopsis ==
Maya lives with her husband, Sundar, and their son, Debu, in a Kolkata suburb. She works multiple jobs to support the family, while Sundar, an ex-soldier with Post-traumatic stress disorder, faces ridicule. Debu cares for his father, torn between love and embarrassment. Maya's family offers no support, disapproving of her marriage. Despite her urging, Sundar refuses to work. One night, he disappears and becomes a murder suspect. When he returns days later, terrified and hungry, the family faces its greatest test.

== Cast ==
- Tillotama Shome as Maya
- Chandan Bisht as Sundar
- Sayan Karmakar as Debu
- Suman Saha as Ripon

== Release ==
Shadowbox had its world premiere on 16 February 2025, as part of the 75th Berlin International Film Festival, in Perspectives.

== Accolades ==
The film selected in the newly formed Perspectives competition will compete for Best First Feature Award.

Award	Date of ceremony	Category	Recipient	Result	Ref.
Berlin International Film Festival	23 February 2025	GWFF Best First Feature Award	Shadowbox	Nominated	
El Gouna Film Festival	27 October 2025	Best Asian Narrative	Shadowbox	Won	
