= Dar Gai =

Ukrainian filmmaker

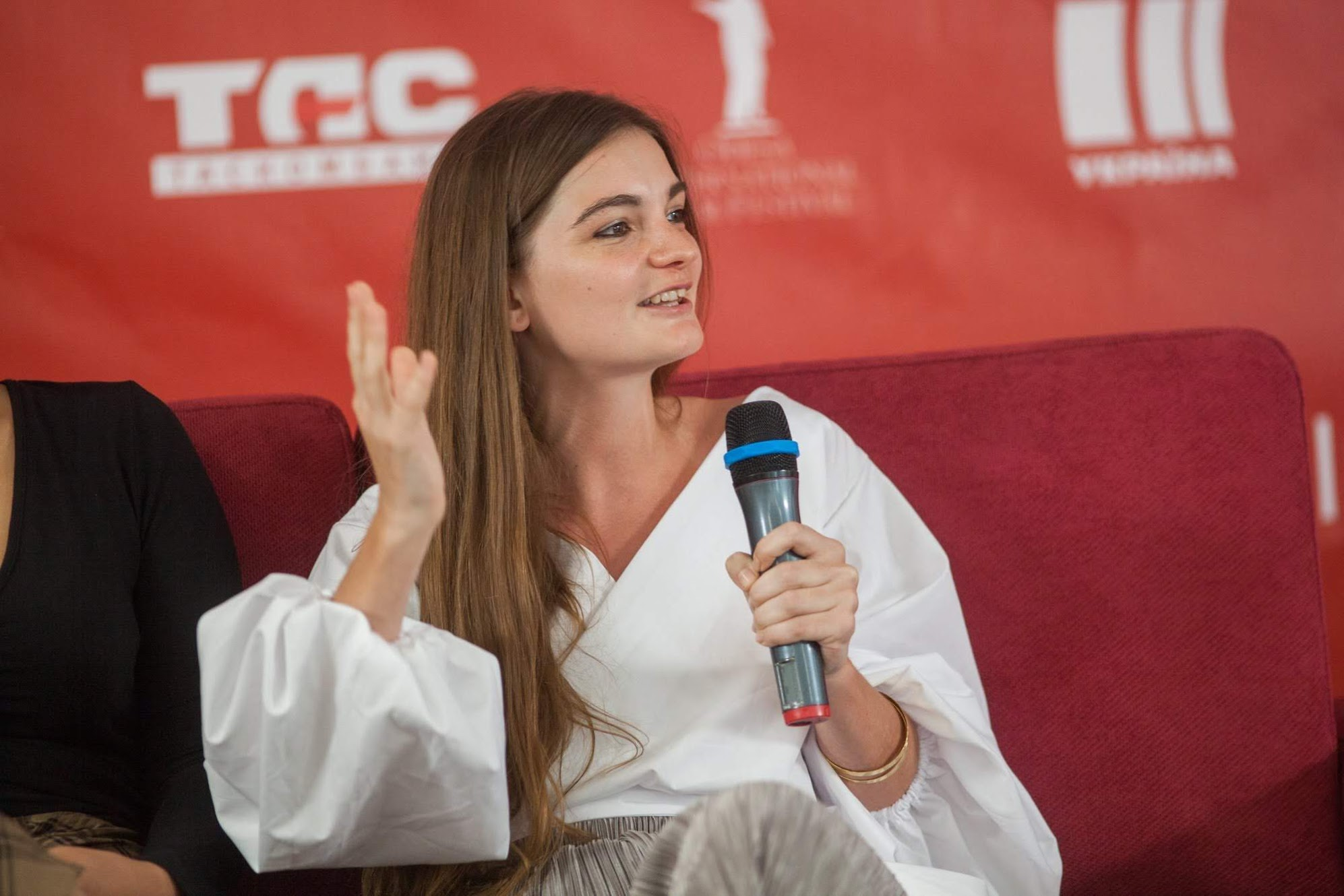
- Born: Daria Gaikalova; December 15, 1989 (age 35); Kyiv, Ukraine
- Education: Minor in film, MBA & PhD in Philosophy
- Occupation(s): Director, Producer
- Years active: 2018 - present

Dar Gai (Ukrainian: Дар Гай) (born, 15 December 1989) is a Ukrainian-Indian director, screenwriter and producer. She is best known for her work on the films Teen Aur Aadha and Namdev Bhau: In Search of Silence. She is the founder of Jugaad Motion Pictures, a Mumbai-based media studio engaged in the production of feature films, television series, commercials, and music videos. Gai has directed popular music videos for Indian artists like Prateek Kuhad and Ritviz.

== Early life ==
Dar was born in Kyiv, Ukraine. She is the alumni Berlinale Talents. Dar holds a BFA and MFA degrees in Philosophy with a minor in film and theatre from the NaUKMA. Later, she was invited to India to direct theatre plays at the Scindia School, in Gwalior. She also taught screenwriting and film appreciation in Whistling Woods International Institute, in Mumbai.

== Career ==
She began her career in India by teaching screenwriting and film appreciation at ‘Whistling Woods International’, a private film school in Mumbai founded by filmmaker Subhash Ghai. Dar's debut narrative feature film “Teen Aur Aadha” (Three and a Half) was co-produced and directed by Indian filmmaker Anurag Kashyap. The film was featured in 40 International film festivals and won 18 Awards, eventually streaming globally on Netflix.

In 2018, Dar directed her second film, “Namdev Bhau: In Search of Silence,” which world-premiered at the Busan International Film Festival, followed by a UK premiere at the BFI London Film Festival and screenings at MAMI, Dharamshala International Film Festival, and IFFI. The film then had a North American premiere at the Palm Springs International Film Festival.

Dar was also the executive producer for the 2021 Film ‘"Last Film Show", directed by Pan Nalin. This film was selected as the Indian entry for the Best International Feature Film at the 95th Academy Awards, marking the first Indian film in 21 years to be shortlisted for the Best International Film category.

She has directed music videos with international music labels like Spinnin Records, Sony Music, and JioSaavn for Indian artists like Ritviz, and Prateek Kuhad. Liggi & Sage have garnered over 300 million views on YouTube, with "Cold/mess" named "Music Video of the Year” by Rolling Stone.

In 2021, She directed the music video for Kasoor by Prateek Kuhad, produced during the COVID-19 lockdown. The video featured fan-submitted clips filmed at home, capturing a range of personal expressions and emotions. The music video subsequently garnered over 20 million views on YouTube.

In 2022, Dar Gai was invited to direct two music videos “ Doobey” and, “Bekaboo” from the film, Gehraiyaan starring Deepika Padukone, Ananya Pandey and, Siddhant Chaturvedi garnering over 140 million views on YouTube collectively. After her work in the music videos, she was invited to work as an intimacy director in the film.

In 2024, she directed Adidas Teen Ka Dream, the Cricket World Cup Anthem, released under Jugaad Motion Pictures. She also directed JioCinema's 'Dum Laga Ke Haisha’, a film for the Olympic Games Paris 2024, celebrating the inspiring dedication of our Olympians.

She has been named one of the “Top 15 Female Filmmakers of the Last Decade” by Taste of Cinema.

== Filmography ==
=== Films ===
Year	Film	Role
2018	Teen Aur Aadha	Director, Writer, Producer
2018	Namdev Bhau: In Search of Silence	Director, Writer, Producer
2021	Last Film Show	Executive Producer
2022	Gehraiyaan	Intimacy Director

=== Music Videos ===
Year	Artist(s)	Track title
2020	Prateek Kuhad	cold/mess
2021	Ritviz	Sage
2021	Ritviz	Liggi
2021	Ritviz	Raahi
2021	Prateek Kuhad	Kasoor
2022	Lothika, OAFF, Savera, and Kausar Munir	Doobey
2020	Jasleen Royal	Nit Nit
2019	KSHMR, Lost Stories ft. Kavita Seth	Bombay Dreams
2019	Ape Echoes	Hold Tight

== Awards ==
Year	Award	Category	Nominated work	Result	Source
2018	LifeArt Festival	Jury prize	Three And A Half (Teen Aur Aadha)	Nominated	
2018	Odesa International Film Festival	International competition program	Three And A Half (Teen Aur Aadha)	Nominated	
2018	Santa Cruz International Film Festival	Best film	Three And A Half (Teen Aur Aadha)	Won	
2019	Ulju Mountain Film Festival	NETPAC award	Namdev Bhau: In Search of Silence	Nominated	
