= Kōbun Shizuno =

Japanese television and film director

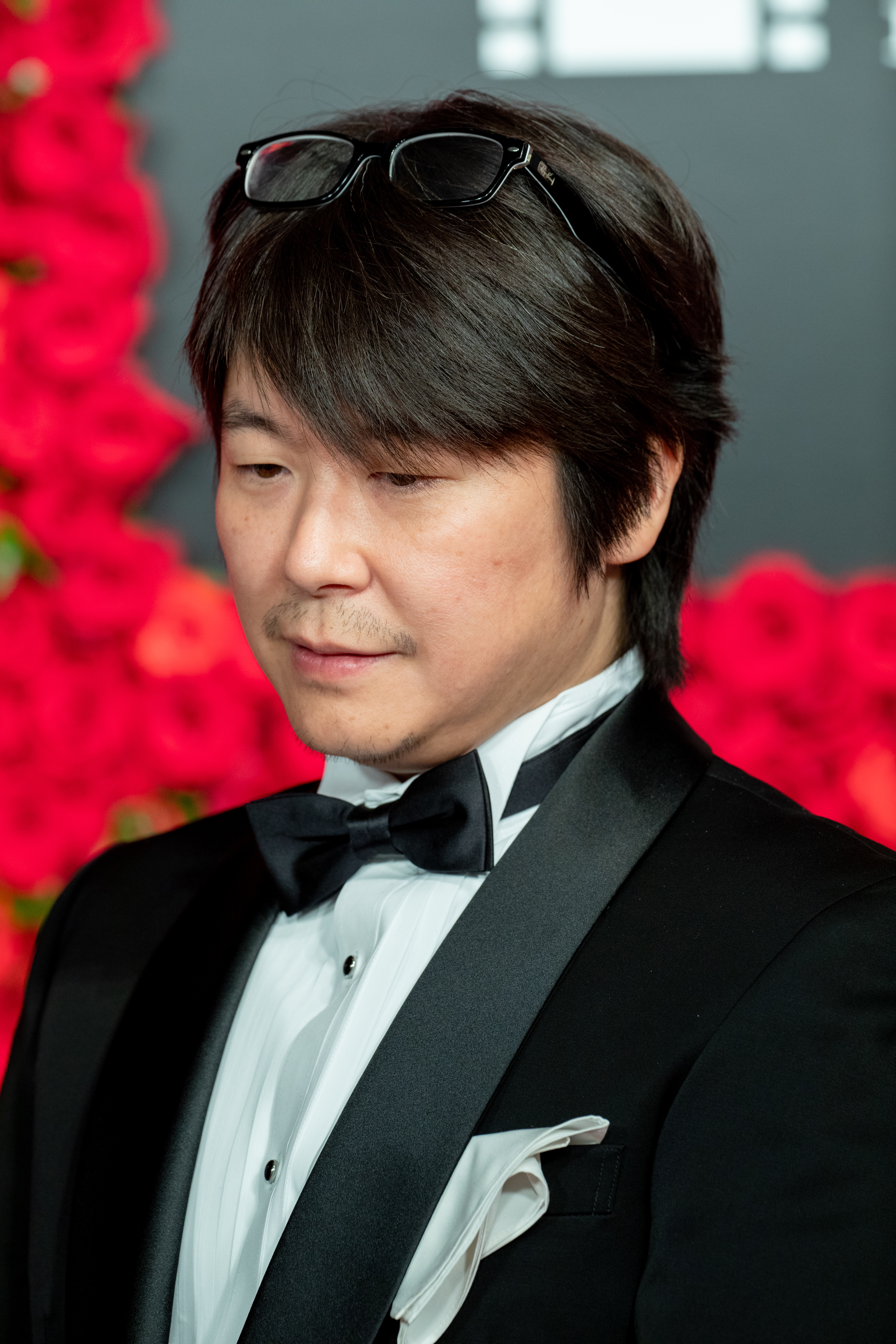
- Born: September 2, 1972 (age 53); Tokyo, Japan
- Occupations: Anime film and television director

Kōbun Shizuno (静野孔文, Shizuno Kōbun) (born September 2, 1972) is a Japanese anime film and television director.

== Works ==
=== Films ===
- Legend of Toki (2008)
- Detective Conan: Quarter of Silence (2011)
- Detective Conan: The Eleventh Striker (2012)
- Detective Conan: Private Eye in the Distant Sea (2013)
- Detective Conan: Dimensional Sniper (2014)
- Detective Conan: Sunflowers of Inferno (2015)
- Detective Conan: The Darkest Nightmare (2016)
- Detective Conan: Crimson Love Letter (2017)
- Godzilla: Planet of the Monsters (2017)
- Godzilla: City on the Edge of Battle (2018)
- Godzilla: The Planet Eater (2018)
- My Tyrano: Together, Forever (2018)
- Monster Strike the Movie: Lucifer Zetsubō no Yoake (2020)
- The Journey (2021)
- Lupin the Third vs. Cat's Eye (2023)
- My Tyrano II: Easter, Garden (2025)

=== Television series ===
- Samurai Girls (2010; credited under the pseudonym KOBUN)
- Samurai Bride (2013; credited under the pseudonym KOBUN)
- Knights of Sidonia (2014)-season 1
- Soul Buster (2016)

=== OVAs ===
- Mahō Sensei Negima!: Mō Hitotsu no Sekai (2009, episodes 1 and 2)
