= Central Asian cuisine =

Culinary traditions of Central Asia

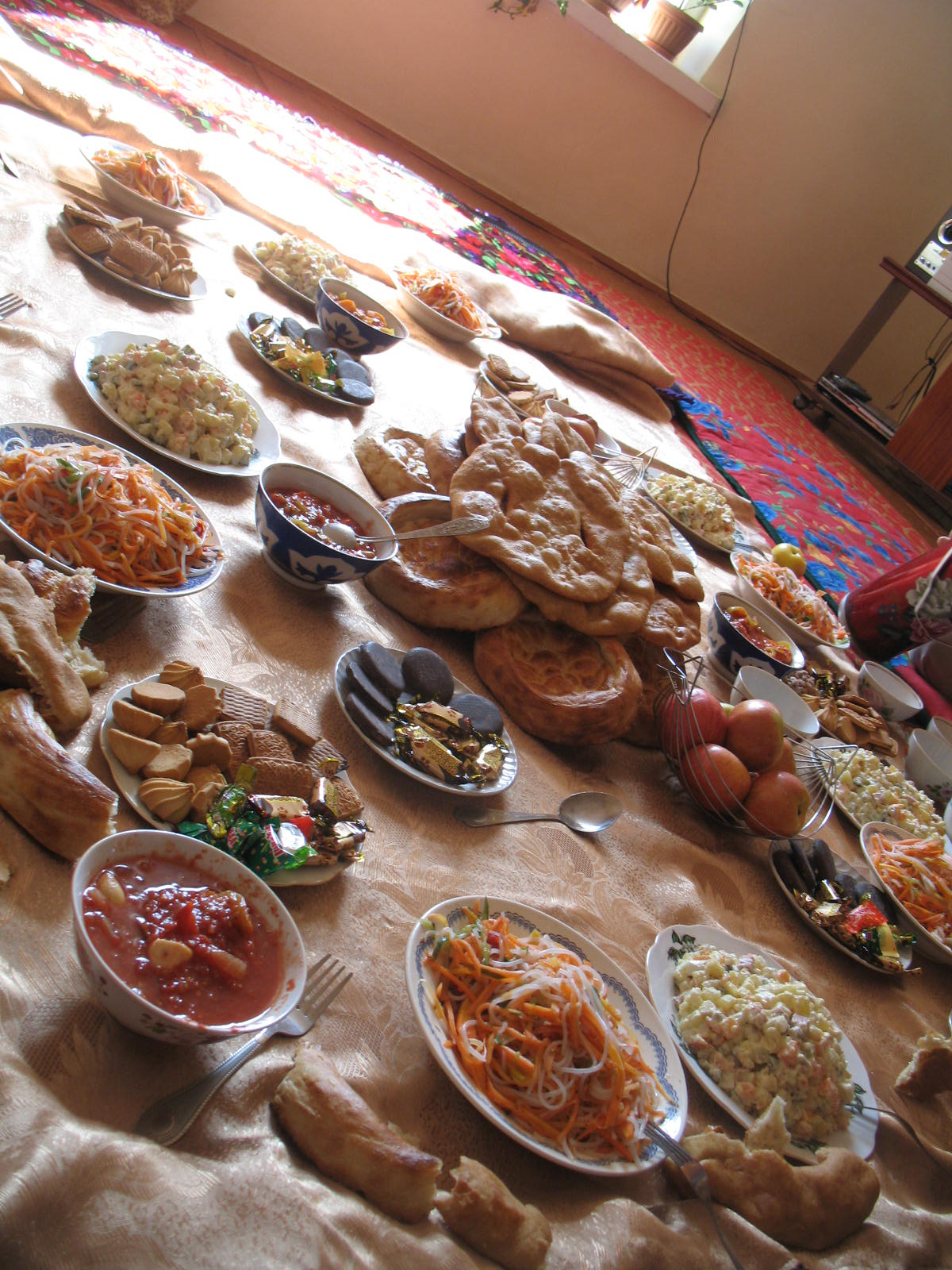
Meal served on a dastarkhan for the holiday of Nowruz

Central Asian cuisine has been influenced by Persian, Indian, Arab, Turkish, Chinese, Mongol, and Russian cultures, as well as the culinary traditions of other varied nomadic and sedentary civilizations. Contributing to the culinary diversity were the migrations of Uyghur, Slav, Korean, Tatar, Dungan and German people to the region.

== Background ==
Nomadic peoples of the Eurasian steppe had simple subsistence diets based primarily on dairy products, and to a lesser extent game and plant-based foods. Excavations at Adji Kui in the Karakum Desert of Turkmenistan have shown the site was occupied between 2400 and 1300 BC. Archaeobotanical evidence has shown that crop diffusion was ongoing across the mountain valleys and oasis towns of Central Asia as early as the 3rd millennium BC. The earliest evidence of domesticated grains bring used by nomadic herders (2800 to 2300 BC) has been found at the Tasbas and Begash sites of the Kazakh highland steppe. Triticum turgidum and panicum miliaceum found at highland campsites in Central Eurasia represent the first known transmission of these domesticated grains from China and the region south of the Syr Darya river into Central Eurasia.

Central Asian cooking techniques were influenced by the lack of water. Poplar trees, saxaul and animal dung were the primary fuel sources used in tandyr ovens, designed to maximize the heat gained from the limited supply of fuel, where flatbread, samsa and meats were cooked. Soups, stews and steamed dumplings were cooked in single cauldron pots.

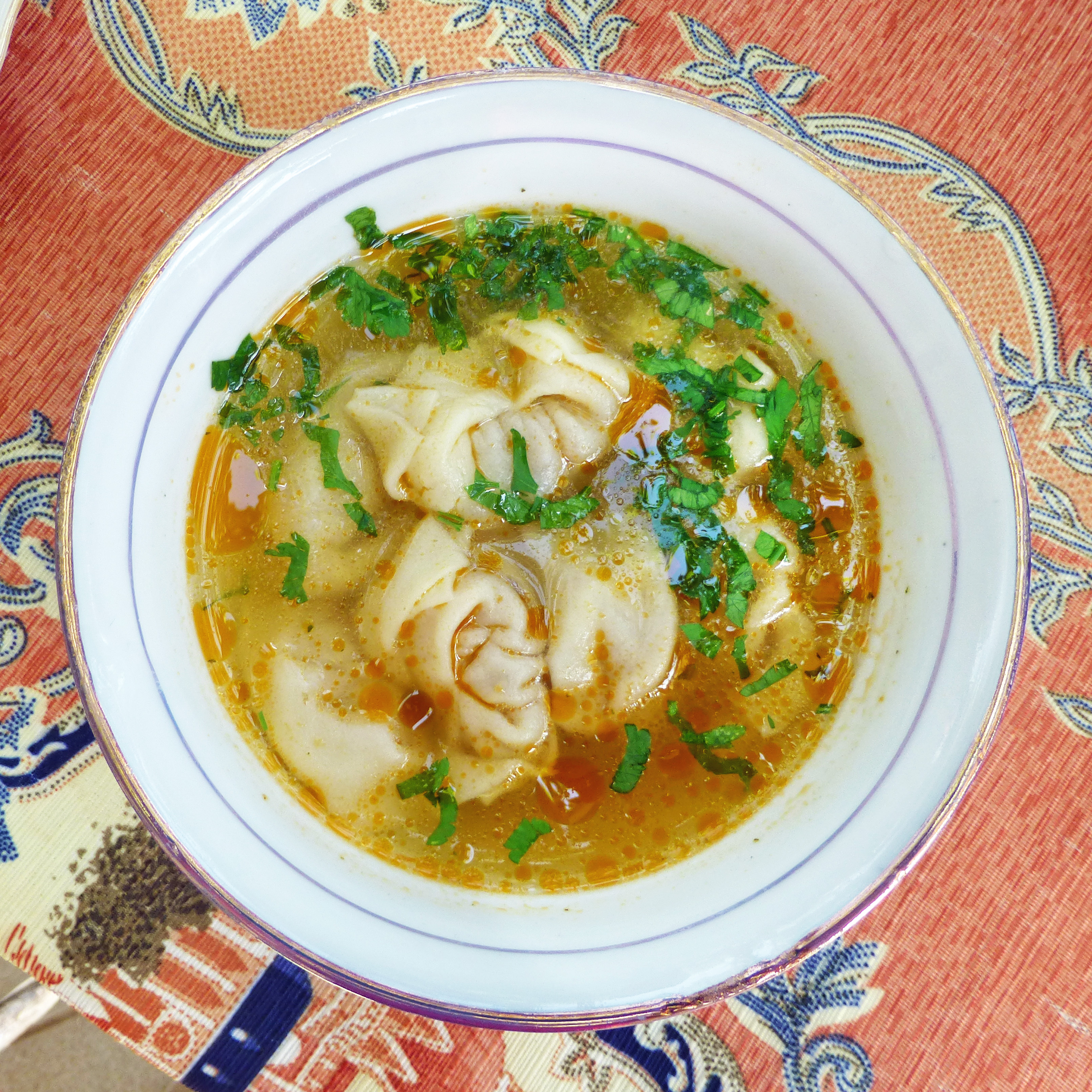
Uzbek manti (dumpling) soup

Persian cuisine in the golden age of Iran was highly sophisticated with ingredients from China and the Mediterranean. Turkic influence was seen in manti dumplings, wheat porridge called sumalak and assorted dairy products. Mahmud al-Kashgari describes pit cooking, baking in earthenware and grilling. Even after the disruption of the 13th century Mongol invasions, Iranian and Turkic culinary traditions carried on in Ottoman palace cuisine and have survived into the 20th century.

Timur's empire is considered the last significant Central Asian Empire of the 14th century, covering the territories of modern-day Baghdad, the Volga and Delhi. The Mughal Empire, founded by Babur, a descendant of Timur, was noted for cultural achievements, among this a sophisticated cuisine that blended Indian and Persian elements into a unique style. Fragrant spices like nutmeg, cinnamon and mace were used to flavor dishes, that were served with thick sauces made from yogurt and crushed nuts. The rice pilafs were sophisticated. Desserts were flavored with rose. Modern Indian cuisine is heavily influenced by Mughal cuisine, including the grilled tandoori meats and yogurt sauces.

== Characteristics ==
The culinary cultures of Central Asia may be divided as follows: nomadic or urban; highland or lowland; and Mongol, Turkic or Iranian. The nomadic diet based on meat and dairy products is found in Turkmenistan, Kazakhstan and Kyrgyzstan. While lamb and beef, breads, baked pies and homemade noodles are common across the region, besh barmak (a lamb dish eaten with the hands) and horse meat are found only in some regions, mostly Kazakhstan and Kyrgyzstan.

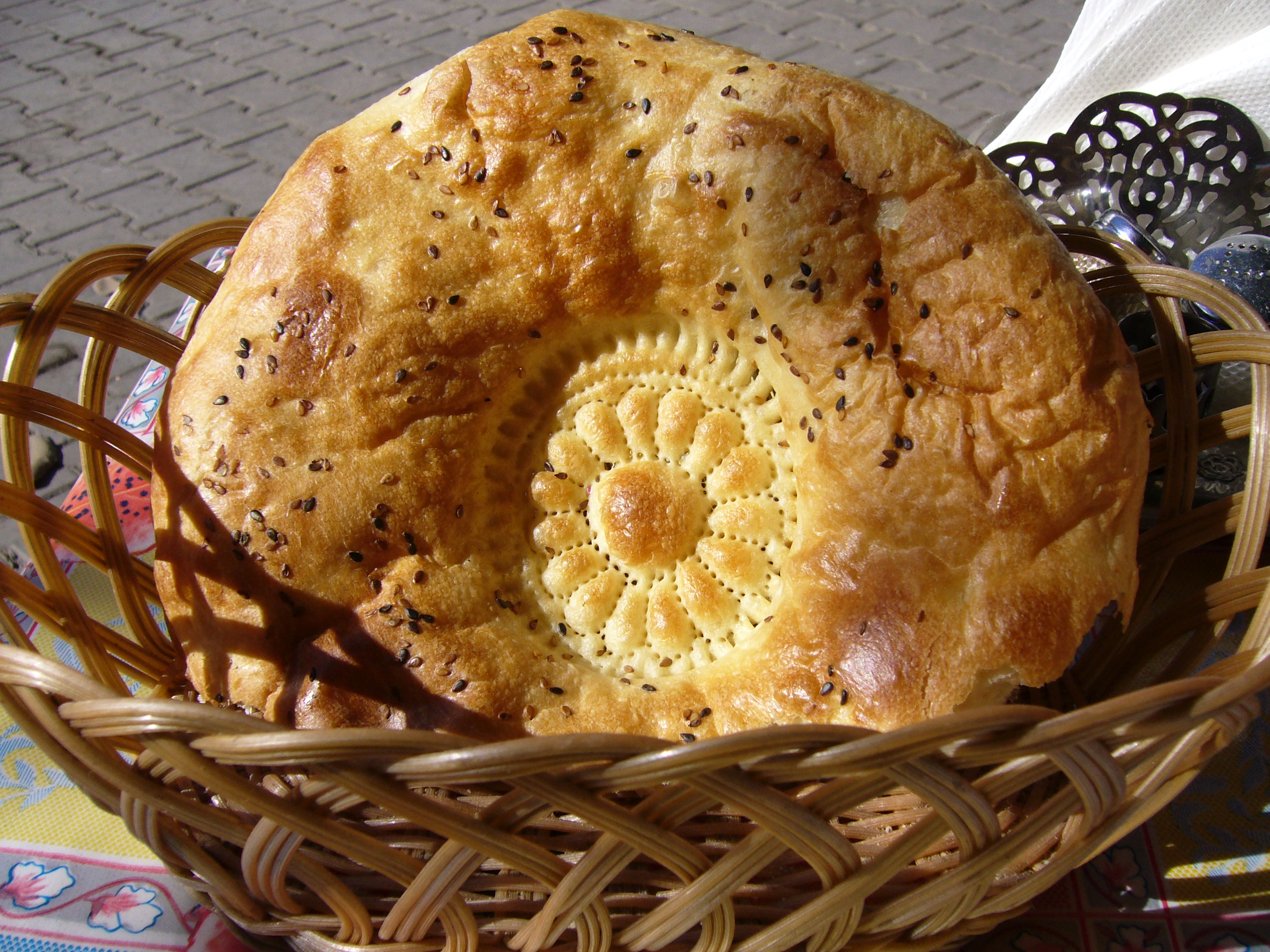
Uzbek nan bread cooked in a tandyr oven

The typical dishes of the settled Turkic peoples—Uzbek and Uighurs—are pilafs, kebabs, stews, noodles, tandyr flatbreads and savory pastries. The Iranian cultural influence is seen in the cuisine of Tajikistan and southern Uzbekistan, reaching into northern Pakistan and India, where rice and stewed vegetable dishes are more elaborately spiced.

Some common ingredients and flavors can be found in the varied cuisines of region. These include generous use of tail fat from sheep and onion, hot peppers, black pepper, cumin, sesame seed, nigella, basil, cilantro, parsley, mint and dill. These are used in all sorts of dishes including soups, salads and pilafs. Less common are cinnamon and saffron.

Tea is the most popular beverage. Green tea with cream is more common in Kyrgyz cuisine, while black tea is more common in Kazakhstan and Uzbekistan. A chaikhana is a Central Asian teahouse where people gather to socialize over tea. Traditional dishes are served like shorpo (soup), shashlik (grilled meats), mastoba, manty, pilov and samsa.

Kumis is a traditional drink of the Turkic peoples of Central Asia. It is a fermented dairy product traditionally made from mare's milk or donkey milk.

A meal typically begins with tea or fresh tandyr nan bread, followed by soup (shorpo) or pulled noodles (lagman). The main course is often a pilov dish with meat, rice and carrots; hundreds of variations of the basic pilov are possible with the addition of different herbs, dried fruits like raisins and apricots, nuts and other ingredients. After the main course a guest may be offered dumplings or grilled skewers of meat, and fresh fruit often takes the place of a final dessert course. In many parts of Central Asia the meal is served on the floor with many plates laid out on a dastarkhan cloth.

Korean cuisine has also influenced Central Asian cuisine, through Koryo-saram cuisine. Koryo-saram, ethnic Koreans of the former Soviet Union, have introduced dishes such as morkovcha that have become significantly popular throughout the former Soviet Union.

== Dishes ==
=== Desserts ===
Halva is made from sesame seeds, with flour, sugar, milk and nuts. Fruit compote with nuts is a typical dessert dish. There are hundreds of melon varieties grown locally in Central Asia, and plums, apples, apricots, pears, berries and cherries are locally available. In addition to these pomegranates, fig, peaches and persimmons are imported.

The local version of baklava is called paklama. For Eid celebrations, deep-fried dough balls drenched in honey syrup called çäkçäk are piled into mounds, along with sugar-dusted dough spirals called urama. Kyrgyz boortsog is a similar deep-fried dough dish, called bogursak in Turkmenistan, and baursaq in Kazakhstan.

Not traditional to the regional cuisine, European-style layered cakes and pastries are available in modern times. Nuts, honey, fruits and halva remain common traditional choices.

=== Fruits ===
The region's melons are renowned, and cherries, apples, plums, peaches and figs are also locally grown. Fruit is consumed as a snack, fresh or dried, at all times of day.

=== Grains ===
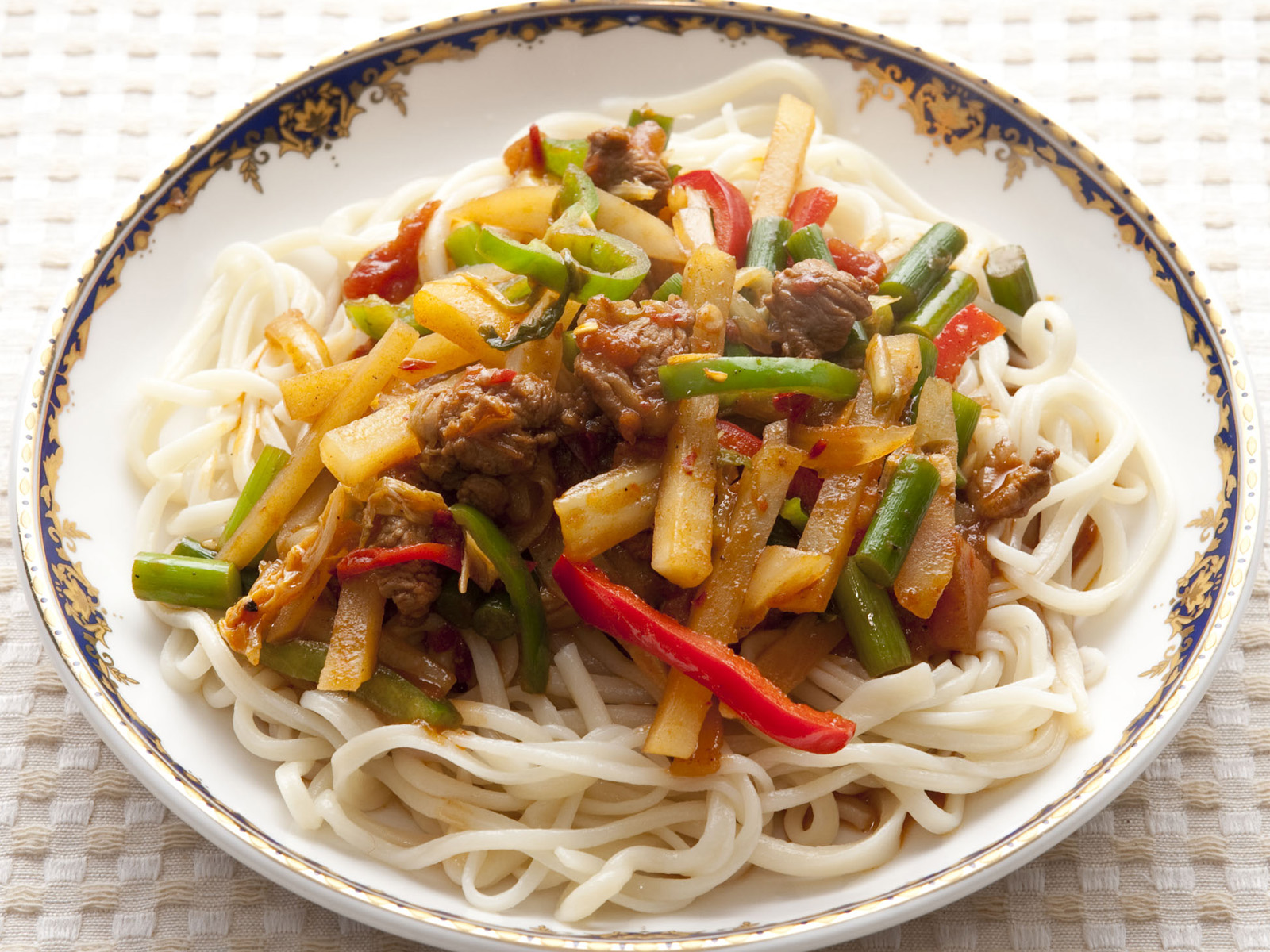
Laghman, an Uyghur pulled noodle dish popular across Central Asia

The main grain crops of Central Asia are millet, rice, wheat and barley. Rice and wheat are used to make the staple dishes of flatbread and noodles. Wheat flour is used to make traditional flatbread called tandyr nan, dumplings called manti, smaller dumplings called chuchvara and stuffed pastries called samsa.

Millet is the main ingredient of the beverage boza. Similar in flavor to beer, boza is made in Kazakhstan and Kyrgyzstan.

Rice pilaf is the most iconic Central Asian dish, with Uzbek cuisine offering a multitude of varieties, often mixed with legumes for added protein.

From Turkic cuisine came the flatbreads yufka and çörek, qatlama pastry and a noodle dish called tutmaç. Beliashi are open-faced pies cooked in a skillet.

=== Vegetables ===
The most common vegetables are turnips, tomatoes, radishes, onions, peas, red peppers and cucumbers. Turp is the local name for a large green radish that is usually eaten fresh as a side dish or salad. "Yellow carrot" (sabzi turisida) is actually a type of parsnip that is used in pilaf dishes. Squash are a common ingredient for stews, soups, dumplings, and samsa.

Both written history and molecular genetic studies indicate that the domestic carrot has a single origin in Central Asia. Its wild ancestors probably originated in Persia (regions of which are now Iran and Afghanistan).

== See also ==
- List of Asian cuisines
- Bukharan Jewish cuisine
- Kazakh cuisine
- Koryo-saram cuisine
- Kyrgyz cuisine
- Soviet cuisine
- Tajik cuisine
- Turkmen cuisine
- Uzbek cuisine
