= Pyanse =

Russo-Korean stuffed dumpling

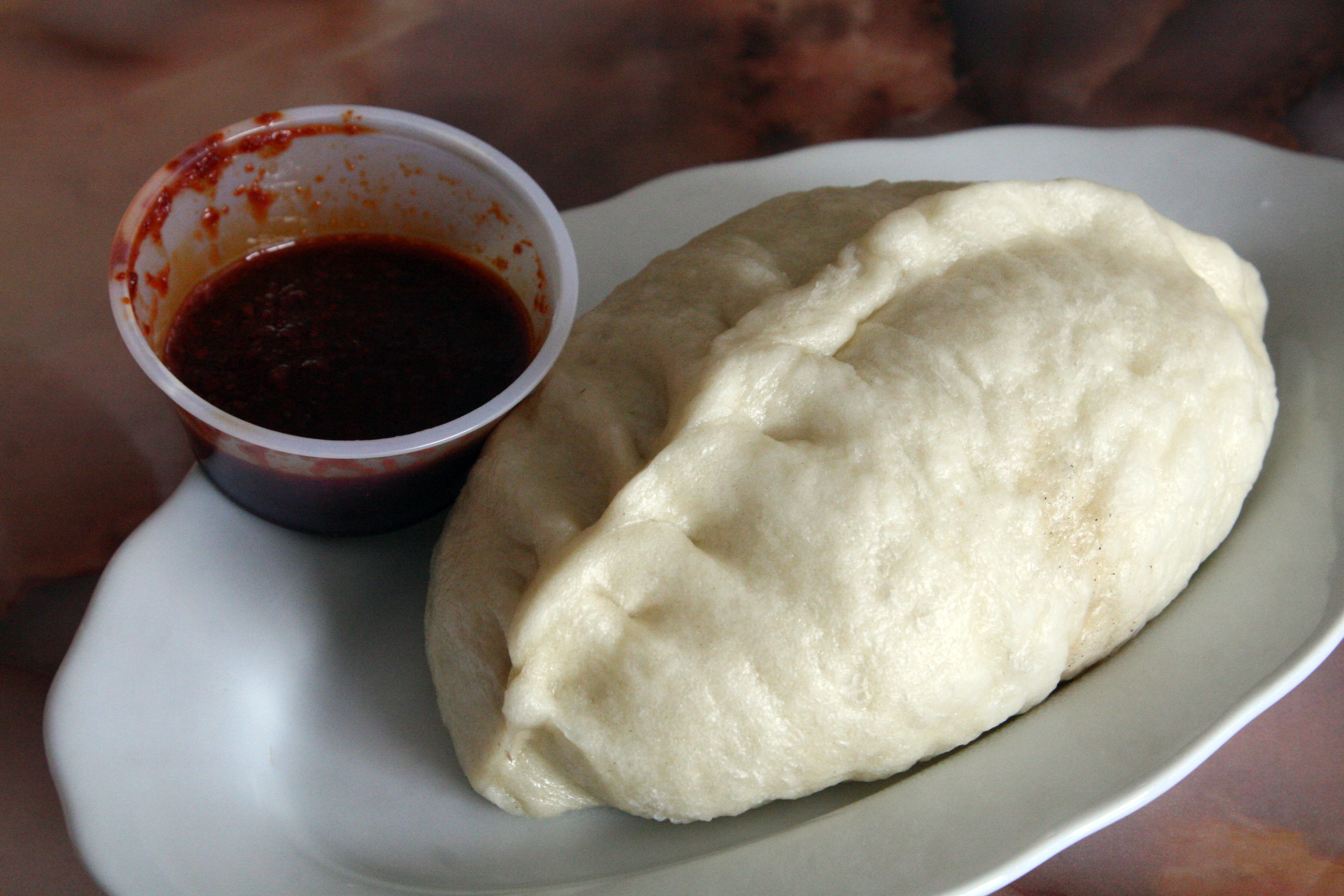
- Begodya, sold in a former New York City Koryo-saram restaurant (2023)
- Alternative names: Pigodi (pigodya), begodya
- Type: Mandu; meat pie
- Course: Snack; Street food
- Place of origin: Soviet Union
- Region or state: Sakhalin, Primorsky Krai, Central Asia
- Associated cuisine: Korean cuisine; Koryo-saram cuisine; Sakhalin Korean cuisine; Central Asian cuisine; Cuisine of Kazakhstan; Cuisine of Kyrgyzstan; Cuisine of Uzbekistan; Russian cuisine
- Created by: Russo-Koreans (Koryo-saram, Sakhalin Koreans)
- Invented: Pigodi: unknown, pyanse: early 1980s
- Main ingredients: Dough, cabbage, meat
- Similar dishes: Wang-mandu; belyash; kulebyaka; pirozhki

Pyanse

Korean name
- Hangul: 퍈세
Transcriptions
- Revised Romanization: pyanse
- McCune–Reischauer: p'yanse

Russian name
- Russian: пянсе

Pyanse (Russian: пянсе) or pigodi (Russian: пигоди, sing. pigodya пигодя), also known as begodya (Russian: бегодя), is a type of steamed filled bun or dumpling associated with Sakhalin Korean and Koryo-saram cuisines, the cuisines of ethnic Koreans of the former Soviet Union. It is typically filled with cabbage and meat and is commonly consumed as street food in the Russian Far East and in Koryo-saram communities across Central Asia and beyond. The dish is a popular menu item at Cafe Lily, an Uzbek-Korean restaurant, located in Brooklyn, New York City.

== Names and etymology ==
The name pyanse is primarily used by Sakhalin Koreans and in the Russian Far East, especially in Sakhalin and Primorsky Krai. The names pigodi (pigodya) and begodya are more commonly used among Koryo-saram communities in Central Asia.

The Russian word pigodi (пигоди, plural), derived from pigodya (пигодя, singular), is the Russian transcription of the Koryo-mar word begoja (베고자). The variant begodya reflects an alternative Russian transcription closer to the original pronunciation.

== History ==
Pigodi (pigodya, begodya) is derived from Korean dumpling (mandu) traditions, specifically the large wang-mandu ("king dumpling") variety. The dish became widespread among Koryo-saram communities in Central Asia, who were forcibly deported from the Russian Far East to Kazakhstan and other parts of Central Asia under Joseph Stalin in 1937.

Pyanse is said to have first made in Kholmsk, Russia, by Sakhalin Koreans in the early 1980s, as an adaptation of Korean wang-mandu ("king dumpling"). It has been the most popular street food in Vladivostok since the early 1990s, and became popular in Moscow in the 2010s.

== See also ==
- Morkovcha
