= Sakhalin Korean cuisine =

Ethnic cuisine in Sakhalin, Russia

Sakhalin Koreans are a group of ethnic Koreans on the island of Sakhalin, Russia. They have a distinct style of cuisine that descends from Korean cuisine and Russian cuisine. They are often considered distinct from Koryo-saram, Koreans of the former Soviet Union, who have their own cuisine.

== Background ==
The Sakhalin Koreans are part of the Korean diaspora that left Korea during the Japanese colonial period. Many were moved either forcefully to Sakhalin, especially after Japan mobilized Koreans to support its war effort, or because they were trying to escape conditions in Korea. After the end of the colonial period in 1945, many were prevented from returning to Korea by the Soviet Union.

== Description ==
The seas and mountains of Sakhalin have significant biodiversity, from which the Sakhalin Koreans drew materials for their cooking. Several first generation Sakhalin Koreans reportedly believed that food was so plentiful on Sakhalin that one can live anywhere, as long as one is diligent. When they first arrived on Sakhalin, living conditions were difficult, but they reportedly eventually came to feel that, due to the biodiversity of the island, (Note: "산에 가도 돈이고, 바다에 가도 돈이고, 강에 가도 돈이[다].")

Money can be found in the mountains, money can be found in the sea, money can be found in the rivers.

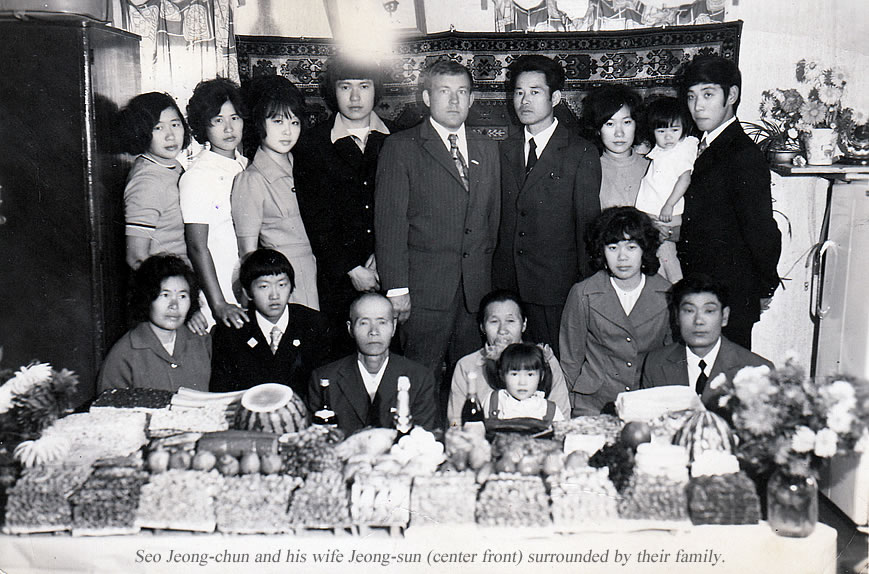
Sakhalin Koreans with food ceremonially prepared for a special occasion, possibly jesa (c. 1940)

While the Korean language and other Korean cultural elements have dwindled since they first arrived, Korean cuisine has been relatively preserved in Sakhalin. Rice and small portions of varied side dishes are offered at each meal, as is typical for Korean cuisine. According to a September 2012 survey of Sakhalin Koreans, 90% reported to often eating Korean food, 80% were proud of their cuisine, and over 80% of young people knew how to cook it. Kimchi, miyeok-guk (seaweed soup), sundae (blood sausage), gosari-namul (고사리나물), manari-namul (마나리나물), and ueong-namul (우엉나물) were reported to be eaten. Other traditions surrounding eating, including which foods are consumed on which holidays and special occasions, letting adults eat first before children, and having soup placed to the right of rice were also reportedly widely observed.

The Sakhalin Koreans reportedly call several shared dishes with Korea by different names. For instance, what is called "curry rice" (카레라이스) in South Korea is called "rice curry" (라이스카레) in Sakhalin, jokbal (족발) is called baljok (발족), doenjang-jjigae is called doenjang-guk, and gopchang is called ttongchang (똥창).

The cuisine has had a significant impact on the diet of non-Korean Sakhalin Russians. Seaweed, kelp, and squid were reportedly previously thought to be inedible (and reportedly used as feed for livestock) by the Russians, but after they were exposed to Sakhalin Korean cuisine, they began not only consuming them, but gathering, preparing, and selling the ingredients themselves. Korean food is now reportedly widely sold in restaurants, markets, and grocery stores on the island. This trend has been bolstered by the rise of the Korean Wave in the past several decades. The cuisine has reportedly become an avenue for mutual cultural exchange between South Koreans, Sakhalin Koreans, and Sakhalin Russians.

A September 2012 survey of non-Korean Sakhalin Russians in their 30s found that 63% reported to consuming Sakhalin Korean cuisine often, 33% occasionally, and 4% never. 74% felt that Korean cuisine was the most popularly consumed East Asian cuisine on the island, compared to 19% for Japanese and 7% for Chinese. They reportedly enjoyed the food because it was well-seasoned, not greasy, healthy, and nutritious. 35% reported to knowing how to cook Sakhalin Korean cuisine, with 64% expressing interest in learning to cook it.

The food is now consumed in South Korea by members of the Sakhalin return diaspora that now live in Hometown Village in Ansan.

== List of dishes ==
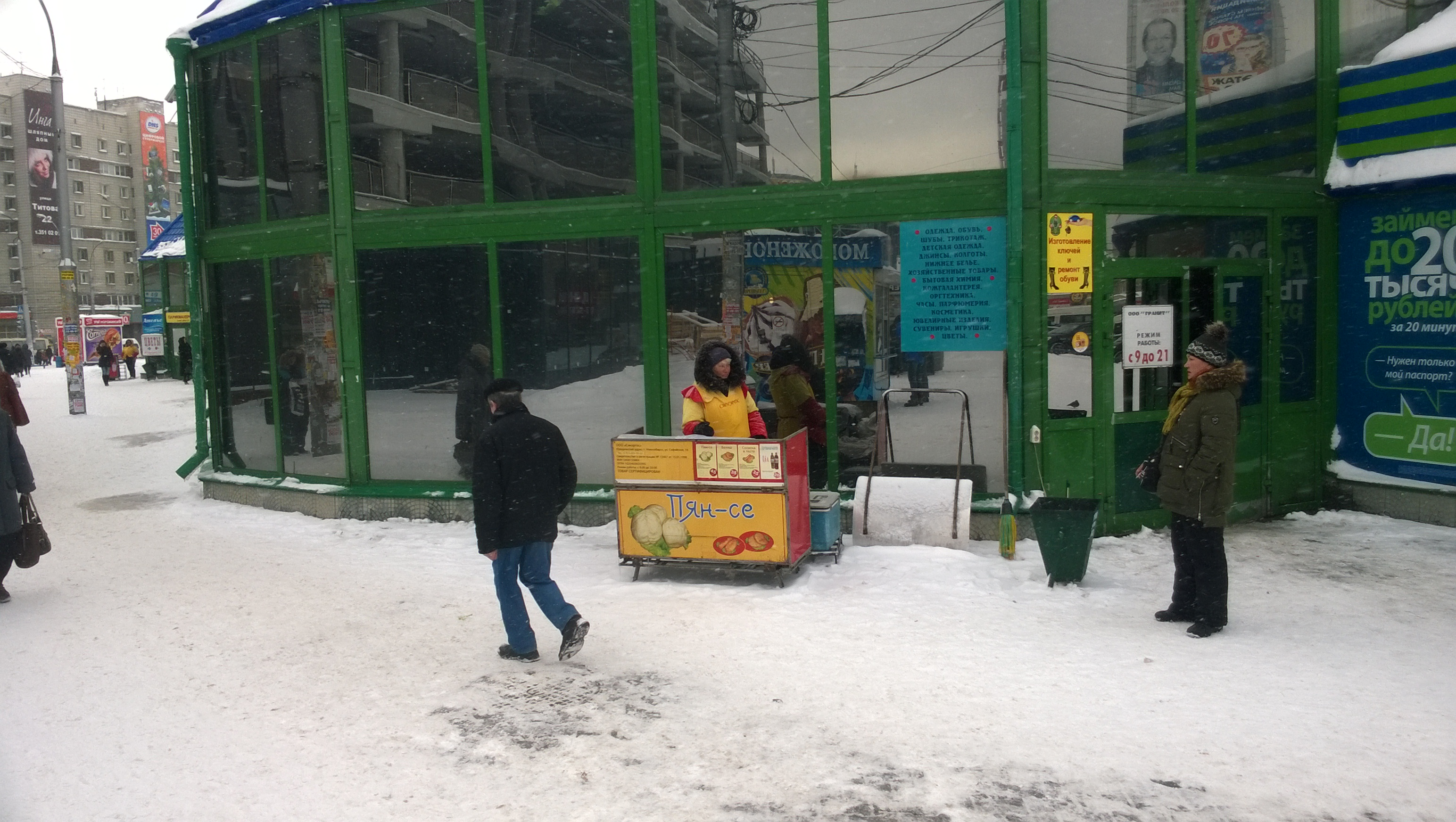
Pyanse being sold at a street cart in Novosibirsk, Russia (2015)

- Pyanse – steamed buns invented in the early 1980s as an adaptation of wang-mandu. It has been popular in Vladivostok since the 1990s. In 2014, Russian entrepreneurs brought the dish to Moscow, and in 2016, there were 10 stores in the central district that sold it.
- Paporotnik – dried and boiled ferns, seasoned with sesame oil, pepper, and garlic
- Lopukh – burdock that is boiled, fried, and seasoned
- Morskaya kapusta – boiled seaweed salad
- Khe – a marinated raw fish dish descended from hoe
- Hemultan – spicy seafood stew descended from haemultang
- Shyupaltsa – name meaning "tentacle", contains squid, carrots, apples, egg, and onion
- Petrushka
- Ukrop
- Kotleta (Russian: котлета) – Cutlets from Russian cuisine
