= Siryak-tyamuri =

Soybean paste stew in Koryo-saram cuisine

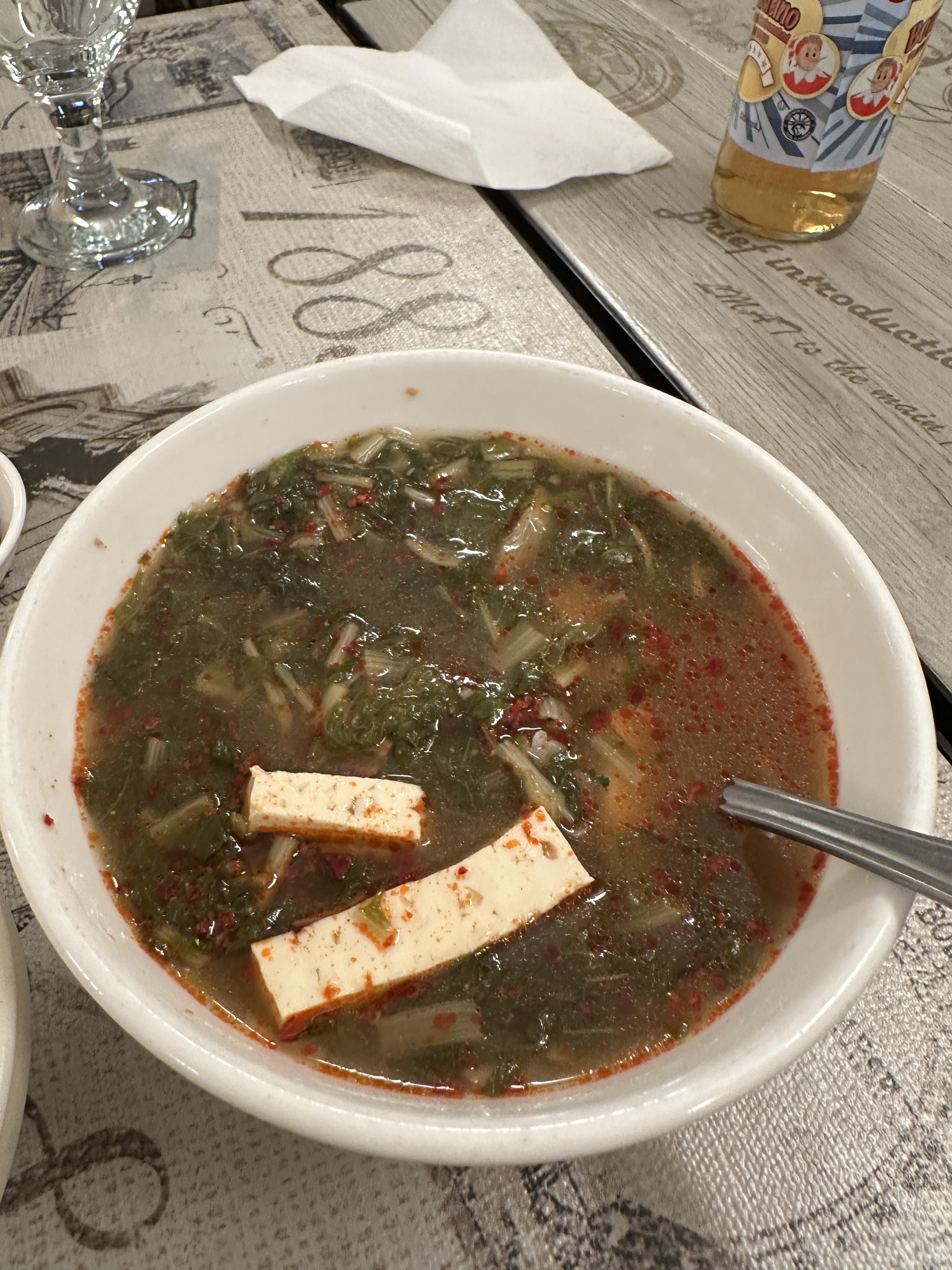
- Siryak-tyamuri served in Cafe Lily, in Brooklyn, United States
- Region or state: Post-Soviet states
- Associated cuisine: Koryo-saram cuisine
- Main ingredients: Doenjang, siraegi
- Similar dishes: Siraegi doenjang-guk

Siryak-tyamuri (/sɪərˈjæk tɪəˈmʊəri/; Russian: сиряк-тямури) or sirak-jangmul (Koryo-mar: 시락장물; сиракжаңмул; [ɕiɾɐk̚tɕ͈ɐŋmuɭ]) is a stew in Koryo-saram cuisine that uses fermented soybean paste (jai; 자이; тяй) as the primary flavorant for the broth. It is a descendent of the Korean dish siraegi doenjang-guk, and prominently features siraegi, dried radish stems.

The dish is considered a staple for Koryo-saram, leading one journalist to remark that the Korean people can survive on just lettuce, doenjang, and rice. One Koryo-saram interviewed in Kazakhstan reported that local Kazakhs and Russians called the dish "Korean soup" (Корейский суп). She also reported that local non-Koreans also enjoyed the soup.

The dish has been used as a metaphor for Koryo-saram identity, and its similarity to siraegi doenjang-guk has also made it a metaphor for shared culture between Koryo-saram and South Koreans. It is known to be consumed in Koryo-saram enclaves in South Korea, including Ttaetgol Village. It has also been served as ceremonial food in a Koryo-saram doljanchi ceremony.

== See also ==
- Pukjai – another doenjang-based dish
