= Pukjai =

Soybean stew in Koryo-saram cuisine

- Type: Jjigae
- Region or state: Former Soviet Central Asia
- Associated cuisine: Koryo-saram cuisine
- Main ingredients: Fermented soybean paste (doenjang; jai)
- Similar dishes: Doenjang-jjigae

Pukjai (Russian: пуктяй, romanized: puktjaj, IPA: [pʊkˈtʲaj]) or bukjai (Koryo-mar: 북자이; букжай; [puk̚tɕ͈aɪ]) is a soybean stew dish in Koryo-saram cuisine. It is a descendant of the Korean dish doenjang-jjigae. The dish uses soybean paste (jai; тяй; 자이) as the base flavoring for the broth. Various ingredients are then added to the base stew.

Koryo-saram are Koreans of the former Soviet Union. They have a cuisine descended from the Korean peninsula and influenced by the regions they have lived in. They primarily descend from Korean populations in the North Hamgyong Province, and as such their language and cuisine is influenced by that region. The word pukjai descends from the term bukjang (북장), which was the term for the North Hamgyong-style doenjang.

In one restaurant in the return migration enclave Ttaetgol Village in Ansan, South Korea, the soup contained tomatoes, cabbage, and a whole egg. This would be considered unusual for South Korean doenjang-jjigae.

== See also ==
- Siryak-tyamuri – another Koryo-saram dish made with soybean paste
