= Koryo-saram cuisine =

Food of former Soviet Union Koreans

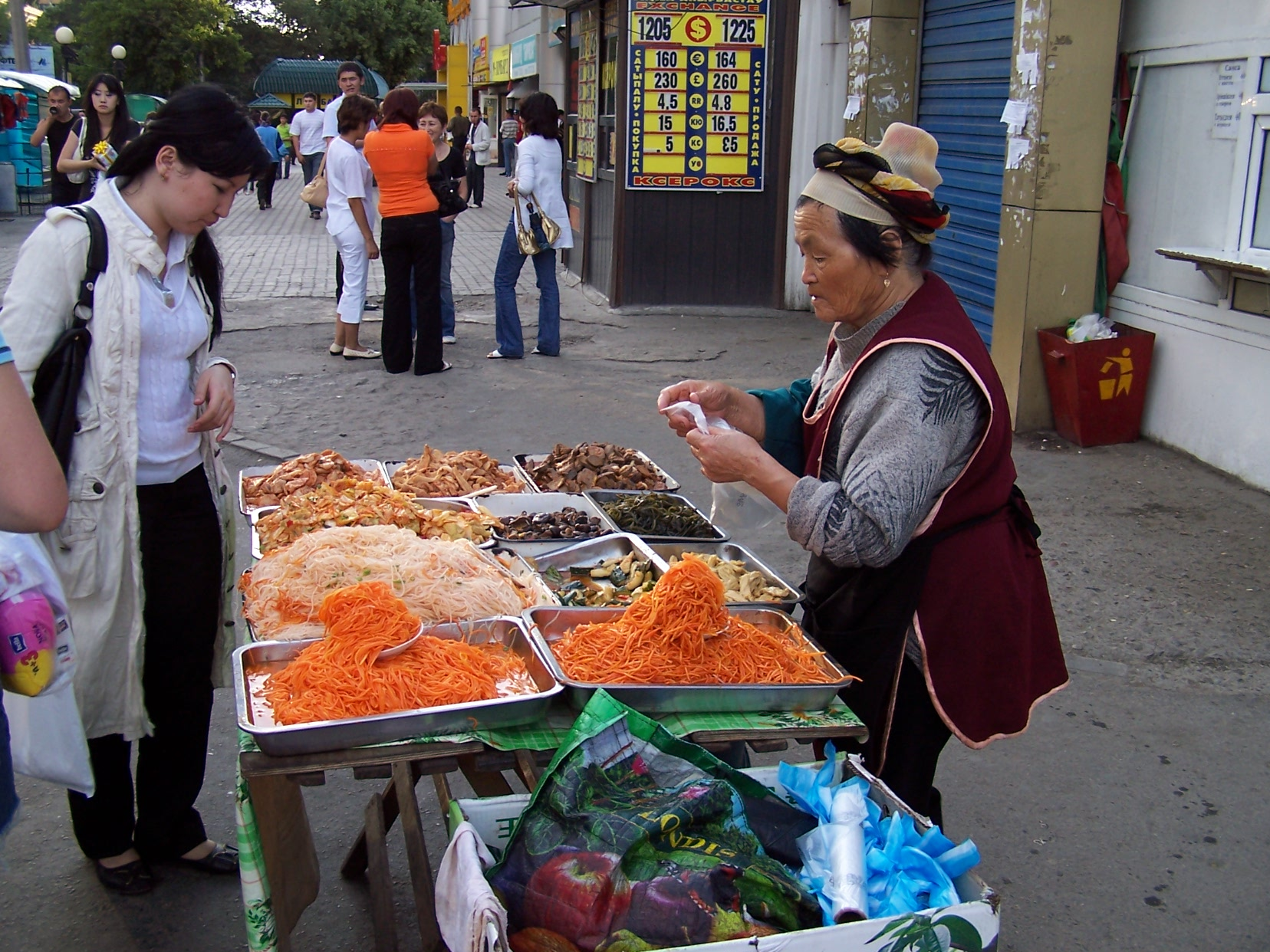
A vendor selling Koryo-saram cuisine in Almaty, Kazakhstan. Two dishes closest to the camera are morkovcha (2007)

Koryo-saram are ethnic Koreans of the former Soviet Union. They have a distinct style of cuisine that is descended from Korean cuisine and influenced by the cuisines of various countries they have lived in. They are often considered distinct from Sakhalin Koreans, another Korean group from the former Soviet Union that has their own cuisine.

The cuisine has achieved significant popularity throughout the former Soviet Union, with dishes like morkovcha widely available in grocery stores. However, to the reported surprise of some visitors from Russia, the cuisine is virtually unknown in South Korea. It is also considered by some to differ from South Korean cuisine significantly, especially as it descends primarily from the cuisine of regions now in North Korea.

== Description ==
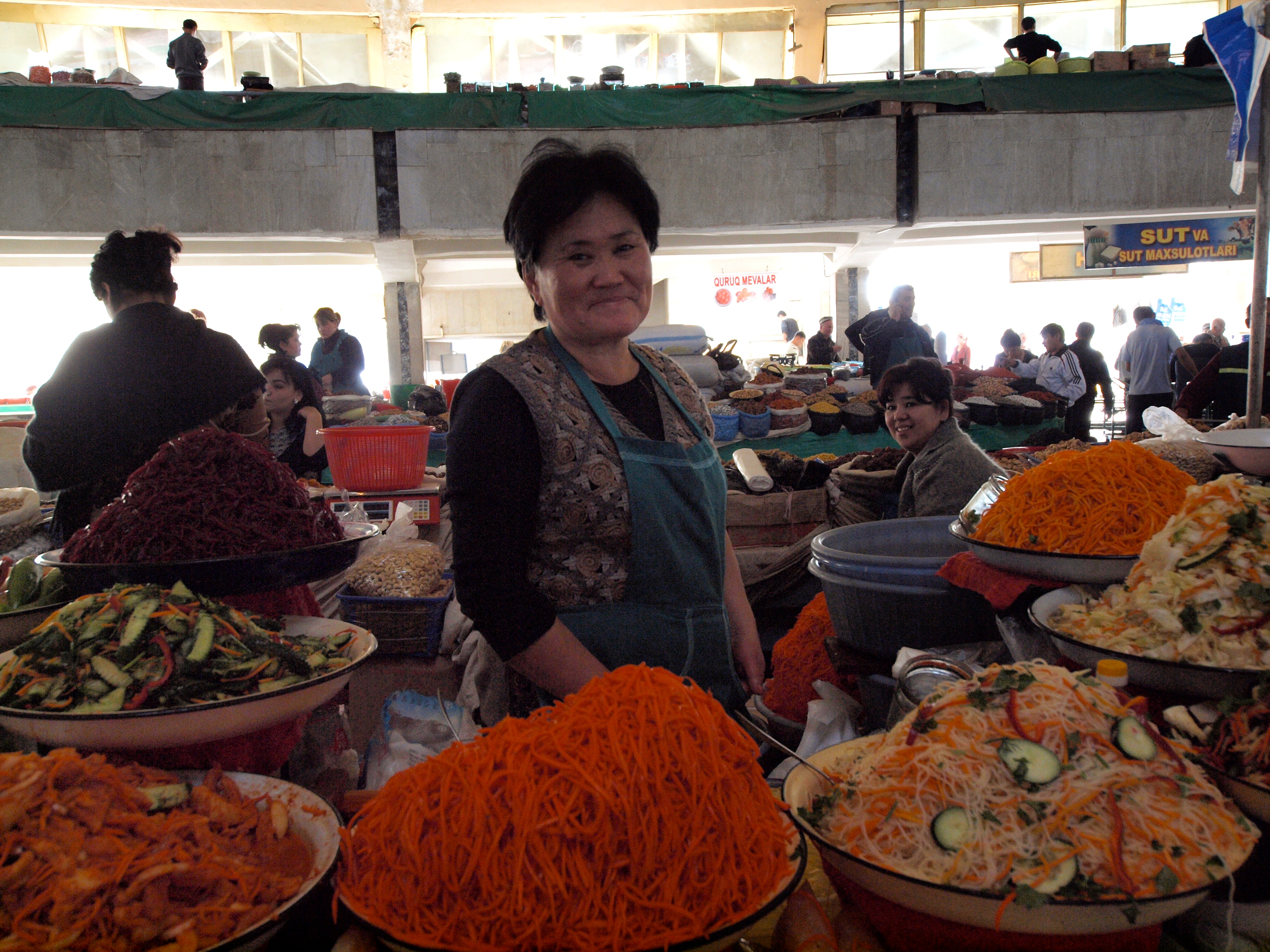
A Koryo-saram vendor in Tashkent, Uzbekistan, with various Koryo-saram banchan, including morkovcha (center) and funchoza (front, right)

Of Korean regional cuisines, Koryo-saram cuisine is most closely related to that of the Hamgyong provinces, now in North Korea. This is because many Koryo-saram are descended from people from that area.

Many of the dishes are adaptations of Korean dishes that use ingredients that Koryo-saram had access to. For example, while pork is popular in Korea, Koryo-saram cuisine in Uzbekistan lacks it since it is not widely available as a result of Islamic dietary restrictions on the consumption of pork. Seafood is also popular in Korea, but inland Koryo-saram do not consume it. The cuisine was also adjusted to suit the tastes of local non-Korean customers, notably by reducing the amount of pepper used.

Koryo-saram also consume food typical to the region that they are in. For example, a significant proportion of Korean Ukrainians move to South Korea for work. Many of them report that they miss Ukrainian food and enjoy South Korean food less than their food from back home. Cafe Lily, an Uzbeki Korean restaurant in New York City, serves Central Asian cuisine alongside Koryo-saram cuisine.

The cuisine is also considered so distinct from South Korean cuisine (in part because it descends from cuisine from areas now in North Korea) that some Koryo-saram, like notable academic German Kim, find many South Korean dishes unfamiliar and even unpleasant. Some Russians are reportedly surprised when they visit South Korea and find that morkovcha is virtually unknown.

Koryo-saram have also incorporated elements of Korean cuisine into other dishes, particularly through the use of Korean spices.

Some Koryo-saram dishes have achieved significant popularity throughout the former Soviet Union. For example, such dishes as morkovcha and jimchi can be found pre-made in many grocery stores.

== List of dishes ==
=== Basic staples ===
English name (Latin)	Koryo-mar (Cyrillic)	Koryo-mar (Hangul)	Notes
Begodya	Бегодя; пегодя	베고자	Steamed buns similar to jjinppang-mandu.
Babi	Баби; паби	바비	Steamed white rice (bap).
Gamachibogu; gamachi; nurungji	Гамачибогу; гамачи	가마치보구; 가마치	Term for nurungji.
Ogureji		오구래지	Patjuk.

=== Banchan ===
Latin	Cyrillic	Hangul	Notes
Bkhanchani; dzhekukddzhi	Бханчхани; джекукджи	판차니	Kkakdugi.
Gimi	Гими; ким	기미	Gim.
Jimchi	Чимчхи; чимчи	침치	Descendant of kimchi, made without saeu-jeot. Name pronunciation comes from the Hamgyong Province pronunciation of the word.
Megi	Меги	메기	Miyeok.
Morkovcha	Морков-ча; марков-ча	마르코프차	Carrot-based dish descended from kimchi. Commonly called "Korean carrot salad" (морковь по-корейски) in Russian.

=== Noodle and soup dishes ===
Latin	Cyrillic	Hangul	Notes
Pukjai	Пуктяй	북자이	A soybean stew descended from doenjang-jjigae. In one restaurant in Ttaetgol Village in South Korea, the dish was served with tomatoes, cabbage, and a hardboiled egg. Jai (тя́й; джай) refers to doenjang.
Funchoza	Фунчоза	푼초자	Cold or room-temperature variant of japchae.
Kuksu; kuksi	Куксу; кукси	국수; 국씨	Cold noodle dish descended from janchi-guksu.
Siryak-tyamuri	Сиряк-тямури; сиряги-тямури	시락장물	Similar to siraegi doenjang-guk.
Tedekugi	Тэдэкуги	뜨더꾸기	A soup similar to sujebi. Egg is poured into boiling pork broth, then pieces of a dough made from potato and flour are inserted into the broth.

=== Entrées ===
Latin	Cyrillic	Hangul	Notes
Banchan; panchan	Панчхан, банчхан, панчан, банчан	반찬	Descendent of sikhae, a salted fermented fish dish.
Sundya	Сундя	순댜	Blood sausage descended from sundae.

=== Other ===
Latin	Cyrillic	Hangul	Notes
Gamdzhi	гамджи	감지	Mashed fermented rice, sikhye.
