= Funchoza =

Koryo-saram noodle salad

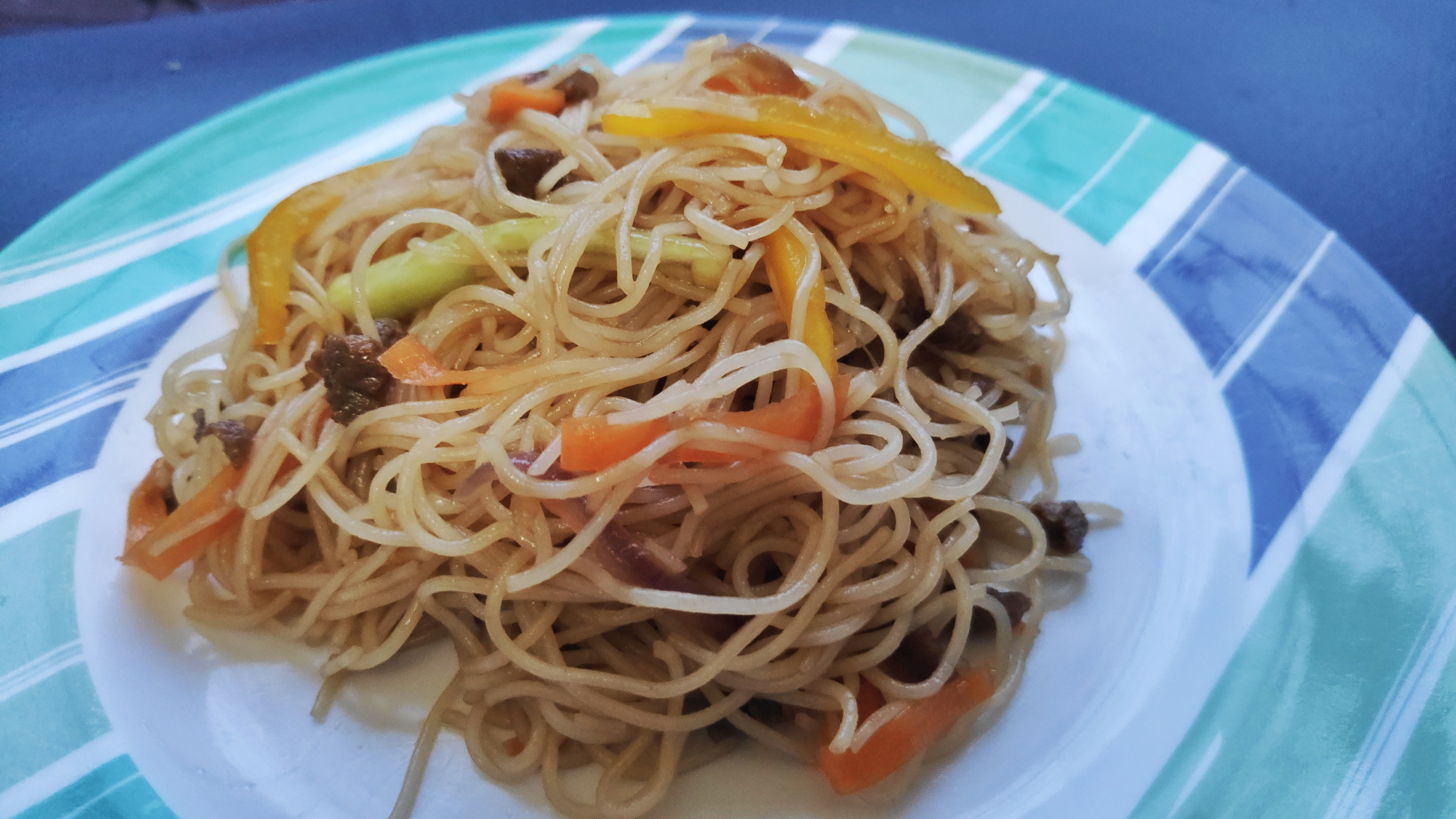
- Type: Japchae
- Region or state: Soviet Union
- Associated cuisine: Korean cuisine
- Created by: Koryo-saram
- Main ingredients: Cellophane noodles

Funchoza (Russian: фунчоза; Korean: 푼초자) or salat funchoza (салат фунчоза; 살라트 푼초자; lit. 'cellophane noodle salad') is a dish in Koryo-saram cuisine. It is a variant of the Korean dish japchae, created by the Koryo-saram: a group of the Korean diaspora of the former Soviet Union.

The dish, along with Korean and Koryo-saram cuisine in general, has achieved popularity in Uzbekistan, where there is a relatively high concentration of Koryo-saram.

== Description ==
Like with japchae, cooked cellophane noodles (당면) form the base of the dish, although unlike japchae, funchoza is consistently expected to be served at room temperature or cold. The recipe is relatively flexible otherwise; various other vegetables, seasonings, and optionally meats can be mixed in with the cooled noodles. Popular seasonings include soy sauce and sesame oil.

== Gallery ==
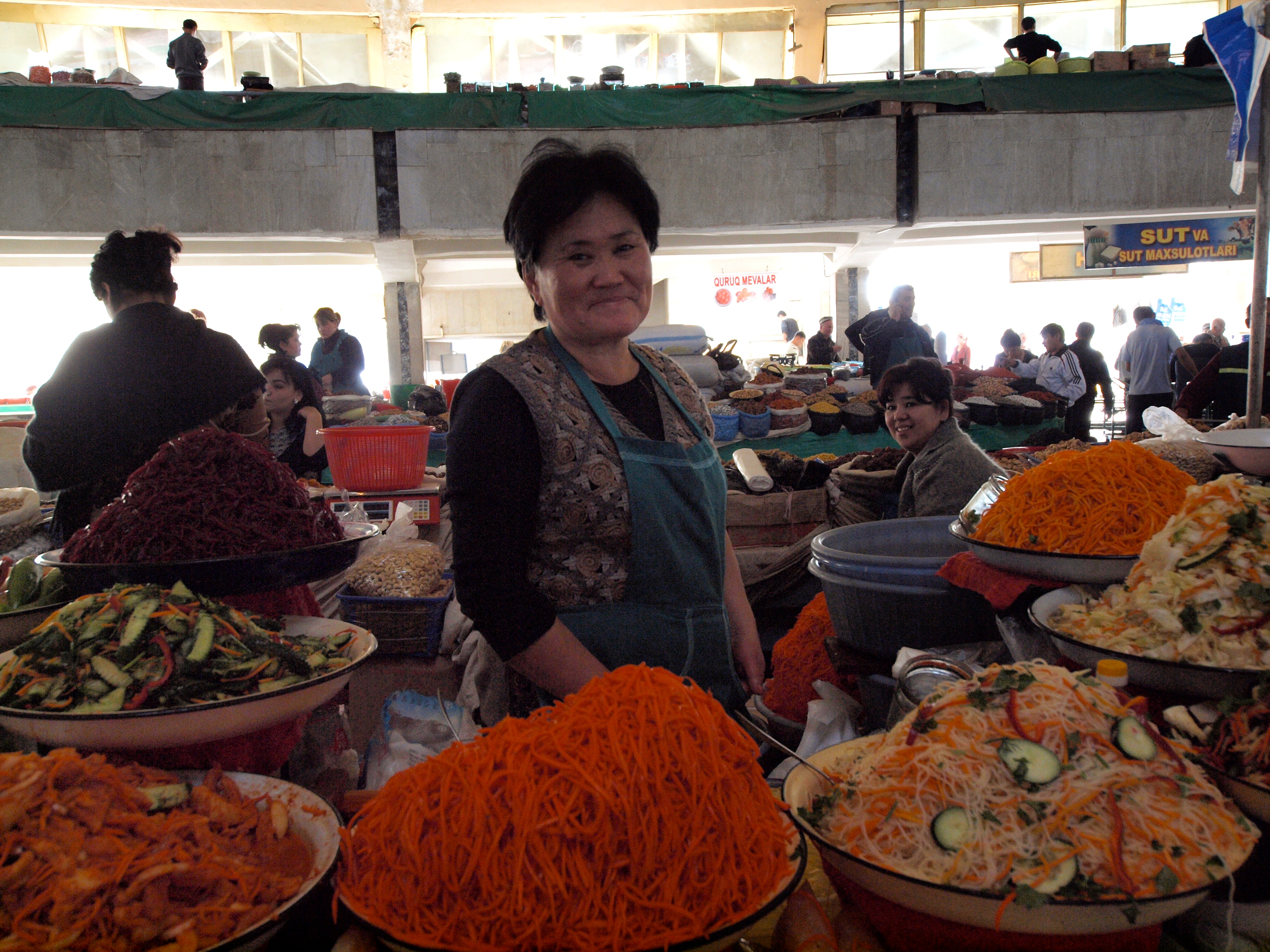
A food market in Uzbekistan, with markovcha in the center and funchoza on the right (2009)

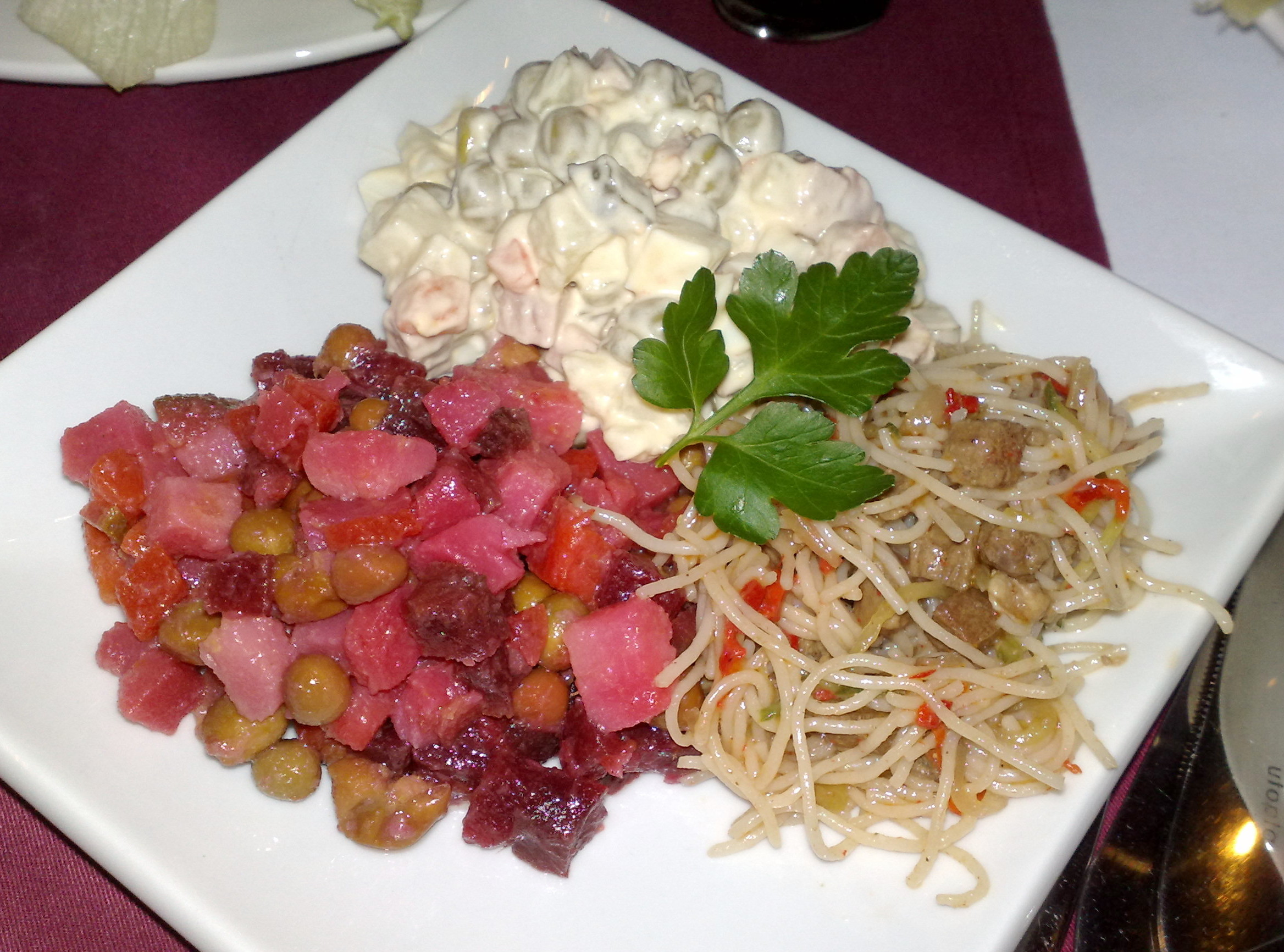
Kyrgyz-Kazakh starters served at a restaurant in the United Kingdom. Clockwise from left: vinegret, olivier salad, and funchoza (2009)

== See also ==
- Morkovcha
