= Cafe Lily =

Korean Uzbeki restaurant in Brooklyn, New York

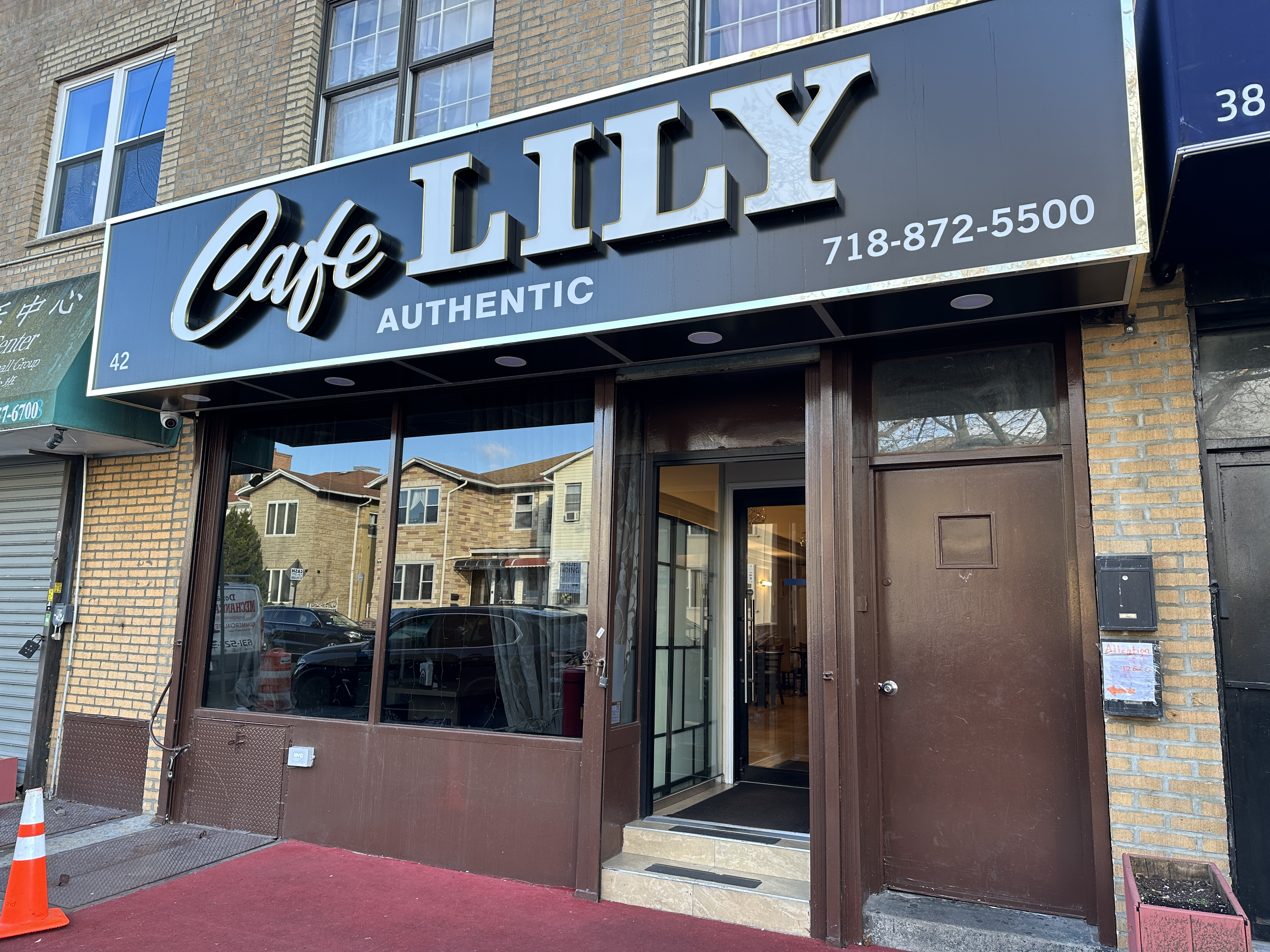
- Storefront (2024)
- Interactive map of Cafe Lily

Restaurant information
- Established: 2015
- Location: 42 Avenue O, Brooklyn, New York, United States
- Coordinates: 40.610140°N 73.983605°W
- Website: www.cafelilybrooklyn.com

Cafe Lily is a Korean Uzbeki restaurant in the Bensonhurst neighborhood of Brooklyn in New York City, New York, United States. It opened in 2015.

The restaurant serves Uzbek, Koryo-saram cuisine, and Russian cuisine.

== Description ==
For Uzbek cuisine, dishes like manti, kebabs, and plov (pilaf) are served.

For Koryo-saram cuisine, dishes like morkovcha (a Koryo-saram carrot-based variant of kimchi), kuksu (loosely similar to janchi-guksu), and u-kadya are served. There is also khe (based on hoe, similar to sashimi), begodya (similar to jjinppangmandu, dumplings), and sundya (similar to sundae, blood sausages).

=== Background ===
The restaurant is run by Uzbekistanis from a population of Koreans from the former Soviet Union called Koryo-saram. Chef Lilia Tyan grew up in Tashkent, the capital of Uzbekistan. Her ancestors were Koreans who lived in Eastern Russia, until they were forced to migrate to Central Asia in 1937. The restaurant is also run by Tyan's son, Dmitry Pyagay.

== See also ==
- All Nations Baptist Church – a church for Koryo-saram also in Brooklyn
