= All Nations Baptist Church =

Koryo-saram church in Brooklyn, New York

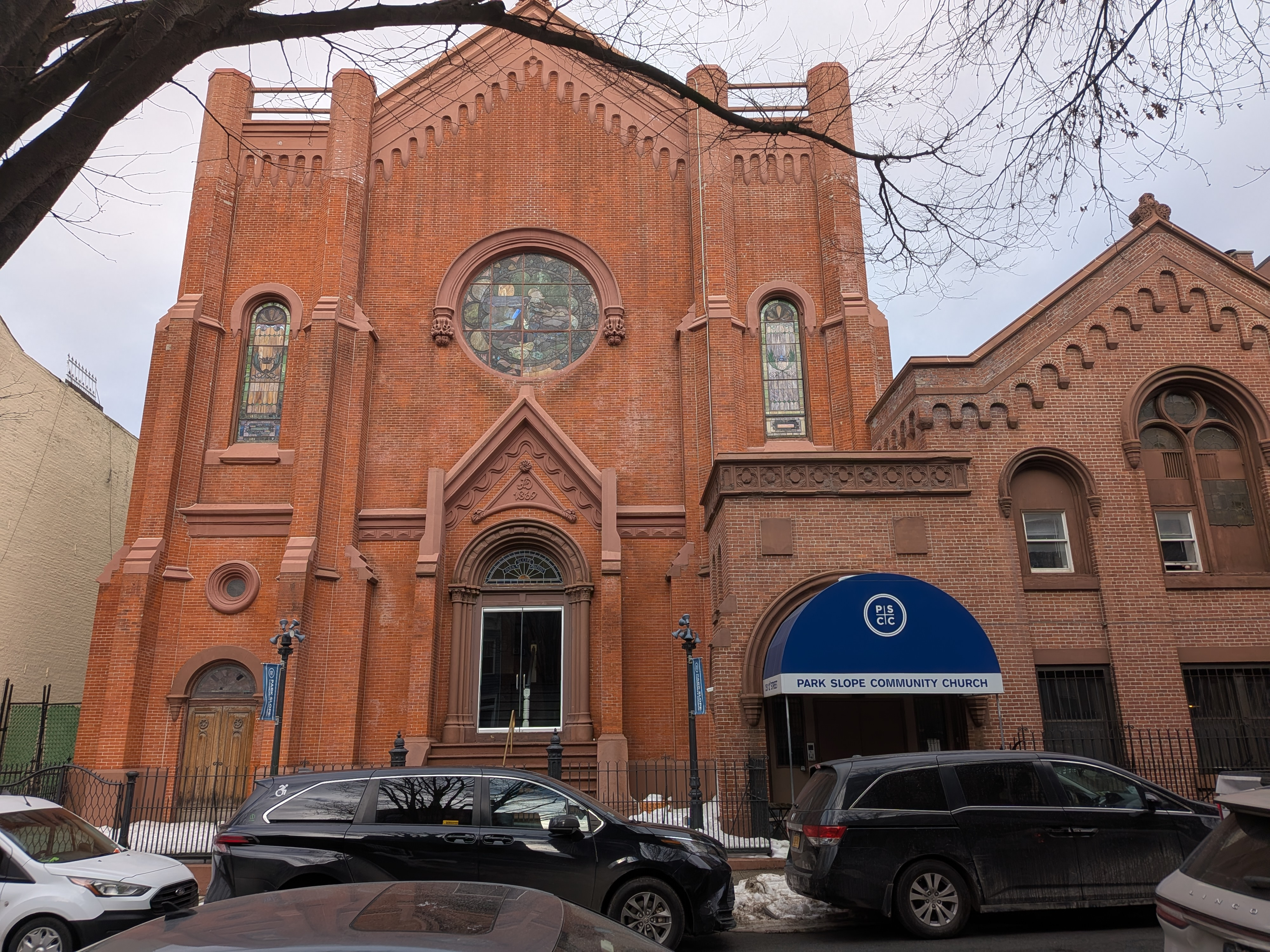
- The Park Slope Community Church, which All Nations Baptist Church holds its services in (2026)
- All Nations Baptist Church
- 40.6680°N 73.9888°W
- Address: 251 12th St, Brooklyn, New York, United States
- Language(s): Russian & Korean
- Denomination: Baptist
- Website: www.anbc12.com

Architecture
- Years built: since 2002

Clergy
- Pastor: Leonid Kim

All Nations Baptist Church (Russian: Баптистская церковь Всех Наций) is a Russian-language Baptist congregation in the Park Slope neighborhood of Brooklyn, New York City, United States. It shares facilities with the Park Slope Community Church. The congregation is often associated with Koryo-saram: ethnic Koreans of the mainland former Soviet Union. It has been described as the only such Koryo-saram church in New York City.

== Description ==
The founding leader of the congregation is Leonid Kim. Kim was born in Uzbekistan. His grandparents were Koreans who lived in the Russian Far East and were forced to move to Central Asia in 1937. Kim was first introduced to Christianity at age 41, when he still lived in Uzbekistan, by a Korean-American missionary from Texas. Despite Soviet discouragement on religion, he converted and became devout. After the collapse of the Soviet Union in 1991, he openly approached Korean missionaries, learned Korean, and openly attended church. He emigrated to the United States in 1995 at the invitation of the American Baptist College. From 1997, he worked as a missionary in Ukraine.

He started the congregation in 2002. Initially, the congregation had four members: Kim, his wife, his son, and one other woman. By 2008, it had over 100 members. During this time, the Korean American Christian community continued to send missionaries to Central Asia in order to convert and bring more Koryo-saram to the United States. After arriving, these immigrants often needed communities and assistance, and found churches such as these to be helpful with that.

According to Kim, the congregation serves some function as a community center for Koryo-saram. Some join the congregation initially because they come to ask for help on immigration issues, but end up staying for the community. In 2017, it was reported that the congregation was 60% Koryo-saram. In 2022, the demographics were reported as 30% Koryo-saram, 40% Ukrainian, and 20% Russian. The congregation has also been known to collaborate and host joint events and services with other local Korean American churches.

According to Kim, the ongoing Russian invasion of Ukraine initially caused some strife in the community that eventually healed. In 2022, the congregation collected donations and funded Kim to visit Ukraine to offer donated goods and funds, as well as his assistance.

== See also ==
- Cafe Lily – a Koryo-saram restaurant in Brooklyn
