= Begash =

- Location in Kazakhstan Begash (Kazakhstan)
- 44.9°N 78.5°E
- Type: winter campsite
- Periods: Bronze Age, Iron Age
- Associated with: transhumant pastoralists
- Region: Zhetysu

History
- Built: ca. 2460 BC
- Abandoned: ca. 1900 AD

Site notes
- Elevation: 950 m (3,120 ft)
- Area: 2,500 m^{2} (26,910 sq ft)
- Excavation dates: 2002, 2005, 2006
- Archaeologists: Michael D. Frachetti, Alexei N. Mar'yashev

Begash in an archaeological site in the Koksu River valley in historic Zhetysu, Kazazkstan. The site is situated in piedmont steppes above the Zhalgyzagash River, a tributary of the Koksu River. The people of Begash were transhumant pastoralists who mainly herded sheep and goats. They likely used the site primarily as a place of winter residence. The people of Begash buried their dead first in cist and later in kurgan burials. So far, the earliest direct evidence for domesticated grains in Central Asia can be found at Begash, with the earliest evidence for the presence of both domesticated free-threshing wheat (from West Asia) and broomcorn millet (from East Asia).

== Chronology ==
- Begash phase 1a (2460-1950 BC): this is the earliest period, dating from the Middle Bronze Age. A stone structure was found from this period. The first burials, coming from this period, were cist burials. The domesticated animal remains came overwhelming from sheep and goats, with some coming from cattle. Wheat and broomcorn millet seeds were first found from this period.
- Begash phase 1b (1950-1690 BC): this layer dates from the Late Bronze Age. The domesticated animal remains came from sheep, goats, cattle, horses and dogs.
- Begash phase 2 (1625-1000 BC): this layer recorded a noticeable decline in usage of the site at Begash. Some bronze artefacts and Fedorovo-type ceramics were found from this period.
- Begash phase 3a (970-400 BC): this layer dates to the Early Iron Age. A golden hair-ornament was discovered from this period in the burial of a young woman. This period shows evidence of artefacts associated with the Saka culture. Low, stone kurgan burials begin to appear.
- Begash phase 3b (390 BC-30 AD): A re-intensification of usage occurred at the site during this period. Walled, multi-room houses were built starting from this period. Saka artefacts are also found in this layer.
- Begash phase 4 (70-550 AD): artefacts associated with Wusun were discovered from this period.
- Begash phase 5 (1260-1410 AD): people returned to re-use the site heavily during this period.
- Begash phase 6 (1680-1900 AD)

== Crops and domesticated animals ==
Direct AMS dating of broomcorn millet and wheat seeds from Begash date to around 2460-2150 BC. Most of the seeds were recovered from cist burials, with very few seeds being recovered from hearths. As almost all of the seeds came from burial contexts, the domesticated wheat and millet was most likely primarily used only for ritual purposes.

Free threshing wheat, either Triticum aestivum or Triticum turgidum, and broomcorn millet were found in all of the cultural layers at Begash.

The early wheat seeds from Begash were small, compact and round. The seeds are morphologically similar to modern Indian dwarf wheat and were similar to the seeds found in early China. The domesticated grains at Begash were not cultivated locally and were likely obtained through trade. Located near the Dzungarian Alatau, Begash is situated along the way on what is described as the "wheat road", a route of likely transmission of wheat and other goods from Western Asia to China.

The people of Begash relied mostly on herding, supplemented by limited hunting. The people of Begash herded sheep, goats, cattle, and horses and hunted red deer, goitered gazelle, Siberian ibex, and Argali.

Most of the animal remains at Begash came from domesticated animals. Starting from the earliest period at Begash, sheep and goat remains were found most frequently, and remained the primary animal remains found at Begash throughout its entire history. Over time, cattle slowly began to increase and eventually became the third most commonly found domesticated animal remains at Begash. Surprisingly, the presence of horse remains remained rather low at Begash throughout its history, although the presence of horse remains did gradually increase over time, especially from the Iron Age onwards.

The people of Begash likely burned dung as fuel.

== Bibliography ==
- Frachetti, Michael; et al. (2007). "Long-Term Occupation and Seasonal Settlement of Eastern Eurasian Pastoralists at Begash, Kazakhstan". Journal of Field Archaeology. 32 (3): 221–242. doi:10.1179/009346907791071520. S2CID 129297613.
- Frachetti, Michael; et al. (2009). "From sheep to (some) horses: 4500 years of herd structure at the pastoralist settlement of Begash (south-eastern Kazakhstan)". Antiquity. 83 (322): 1023–1037. doi:10.1017/S0003598X00099324. S2CID 54548388.
- Frachetti, Michael (2008). Pastoralist landscapes and social interaction in bronze age Eurasia. University of California Press. ISBN 978-0-520-25689-7.
- Frachetti, Michael; et al. (2010). "Earliest direct evidence for broomcorn millet and wheat in the central Eurasian steppe region". Antiquity. 84 (326): 993–1010. doi:10.1017/S0003598X0006703X. S2CID 163132760.
- Spengler, Robert N.; Frachetti, Michael D.; Fritz, Gayle J. (2013). "Ecotopes and Herd Foraging Practices In the Steppe/Mountain Ecotone of Central Asia During the Bronze and Iron Ages". Journal of Ethnobiology. 33 (1): 125–147. doi:10.2993/0278-0771-33.1.125. ISSN 0278-0771. S2CID 83904988.
- Spengler, Robert; et al. (2014). "Early agriculture and crop transmission among Bronze Age mobile pastoralists of Central Eurasia". Proceedings of the Royal Society. 281 (1783) 20133382. doi:10.1098/rspb.2013.3382. PMC 3996608. PMID 24695428.
