= Koryo-saram =

Ethnic Koreans in the former USSR

Total population
- About 500,000

Regions with significant populations
- Uzbekistan: 174,200
- Kazakhstan: 118,450
- Russia: 87,819
- Kyrgyzstan: 17,094
- Ukraine: 12,711
- Turkmenistan: 2,500
- Tajikistan: 634
- Belarus: 400
- Estonia: 208
- Lithuania: 62

Languages
- Russian, Korean (Koryo-mar)

Religion
- Buddhism, Eastern and Western Christianity, Islam, native Korean religions and others

Related ethnic groups
- Koreans, Sakhalin Koreans

Koryo-saram

Korean name
- Hangul: 고려사람
- Hanja: 高麗사람
Transcriptions
- Revised Romanization: Goryeosaram
- McCune–Reischauer: Koryŏsaram

South Korean name
- Hangul: 고려인
- Hanja: 高麗人
Transcriptions
- Revised Romanization: Goryeoin
- McCune–Reischauer: Koryŏin

Russian name
- Russian: Корё сарам / Корё ин
- Romanization: Koryo saram / Koryo in

Koryo-saram (Note: Russian: Корё сарам[kɐˈrʲɵ ˈsarəm]; Korean: 고려사람; MR: Koryŏ-saram; [koˈrʲɔˑ ˈsɐˑrɐm], also known as Goryeoin/Koryoin in South Korea(Корё ин; 고려인; Goryeoin; Koryŏin) or Soviet Koreans) are ethnic Koreans of the mainland former Soviet Union who descend from Koreans who lived in the Russian Far East.

Koreans began settling in the Russian Far East and Siberia in the late 19th century. Their numbers swelled as Koreans fled the Japanese colonization of Korea beginning in 1910. A number of Koryo-saram became significant Korean independence activists, such as Hong Beom-do and Chŏng Sangjin. In 1937, they were deported to Central Asia, where most have since remained.

Approximately 500,000 Koryo-saram reside in the former Soviet Union, primarily in the now-independent states of Central Asia. There are large Korean communities in Southern Russia (around Volgograd), the Russian Far East (around Vladivostok), the Caucasus, Kyrgyzstan, Turkmenistan and Southern Ukraine. Like most immigrant populations of different nationalities worldwide, they have retained some elements of Korean culture, including Korean naming practices despite increasing assimilation in all respects. Koryo-saram cuisine has become popular throughout the former Soviet Union, with the dish morkovcha now widely available in grocery stores there. Many Koryo-saram have moved temporarily or permanently to South Korea for economic or cultural reasons. The Russo-Ukrainian War, especially the 2022 Russian invasion of Ukraine, motivated several thousand Korean Ukrainians to move to South Korea.

Sakhalin Koreans also exist on the island of Sakhalin in Russia, but they are often considered a separate ethnic group. The majority of this population originated from when Sakhalin was partially under Japanese rule, and did not experience the forced deportation to Central Asia. Some of them identify as Koryo-saram, but many do not. This has led to the term materikovye (материковые) for Koryo-saram, meaning "continentals".

== Autonym ==
The term by which they refer to themselves is composed of two Korean words: Goryeo/Koryo, of the Goryeo (Koryŏ) Dynasty from which Korea was derived, and saram, meaning "person" or "people". (Note: Nouns in Korean do not inflect for number unless it is needed to avoid ambiguity, therefore "saram" translates as either "person" or "people" depending on context.)

The name Soviet Korean was also used, more frequently before the collapse of the Soviet Union. Russians may also lump Koryo-saram under the general label koreytsy (корейцы); however, this usage makes no distinctions between ethnic Koreans of the local nationality and Korean nationals (citizens of North Korea or South Korea).

In Standard Korean, the term Koryo-saram is typically used to refer to historical figures from the Goryeo dynasty; to avoid ambiguity, Korean speakers use a word Goryeoin (고려인; 高麗人, meaning the same as Koryo-saram) to refer to ethnic Koreans in the post-Soviet states. However, the Sino-Korean morpheme -in (인; 人) is not productive in Koryo-mal, the dialect spoken by Koryo-saram, and as a result, only a few (mainly those who have studied Standard Korean) refer to themselves by this name; instead, Koryo-saram has come to be the preferred term.

== History ==
=== Initial Immigration to Russia ===
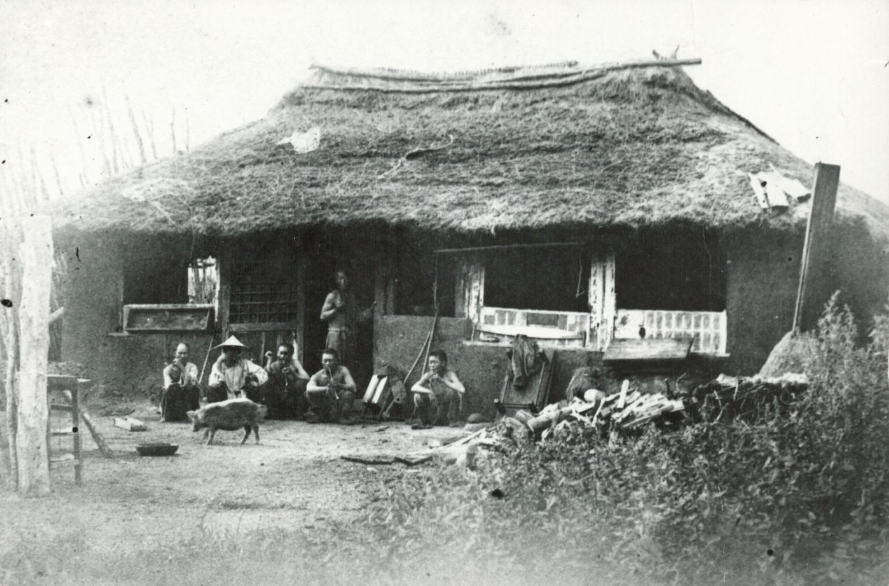
A Korean home in Nakhodka, Russia (1893)

The early 19th century saw the decline of the Korean Joseon dynasty. A small population of wealthy elite owned the farmlands in the country, and poor peasants found it difficult to survive. Koreans leaving the country in this period were obliged to move toward Russia, as the border with China was sealed by the Qing Dynasty. However, the first Koreans in the Russian Empire, 761 families totaling 5,310 people, had actually migrated to Qing territory; the land they had settled on was ceded to Russia by the Convention of Peking in 1860. Many peasants considered Siberia to be a land where they could lead better lives, and so they subsequently migrated there. According to Russian sources early as 1863, 13 Korean households were recorded in Posyet, near the Bay of Novgorod. (Note: The old name of Posyet at the date of foundation in 1860 was Novgorodsky Posyet. The Korean source says it is Novgorod Bay; however, by context, it means Novgorodsky Bay, which can be translated as Bay of Novgorod by the Russian -sky.) These numbers rose dramatically, and by 1869 Koreans composed 20% of the population of the Primorsky Krai. Prior to the completion of the Trans-Siberian Railway, Koreans outnumbered Russians in the Russian Far East; the local governors encouraged them to naturalize. The village of Blagoslovennoe was founded in 1870 by Korean migrants. Another Korean village near Zolotoy Rog that Russians called Koreyskaya slabodka (Корейская слабодка, literally means Korean village) and what Koreans called Gaecheok-ri (開拓里,개척리) was officially recognized by the Vladivostok authorities. (Note: The region already had a Korean house in 1874, and was the biggest Korean village among the 7 villages recorded in the 1907 Russian census. The town was abandoned after the 1911 order by the Russian authorities due to cholera concerns. and the old town became the new base for the Russian Kazakh military.) The 1897 Russian Empire Census found 26,005 Korean speakers (16,225 men and 9,780 women) in the whole of Russia.

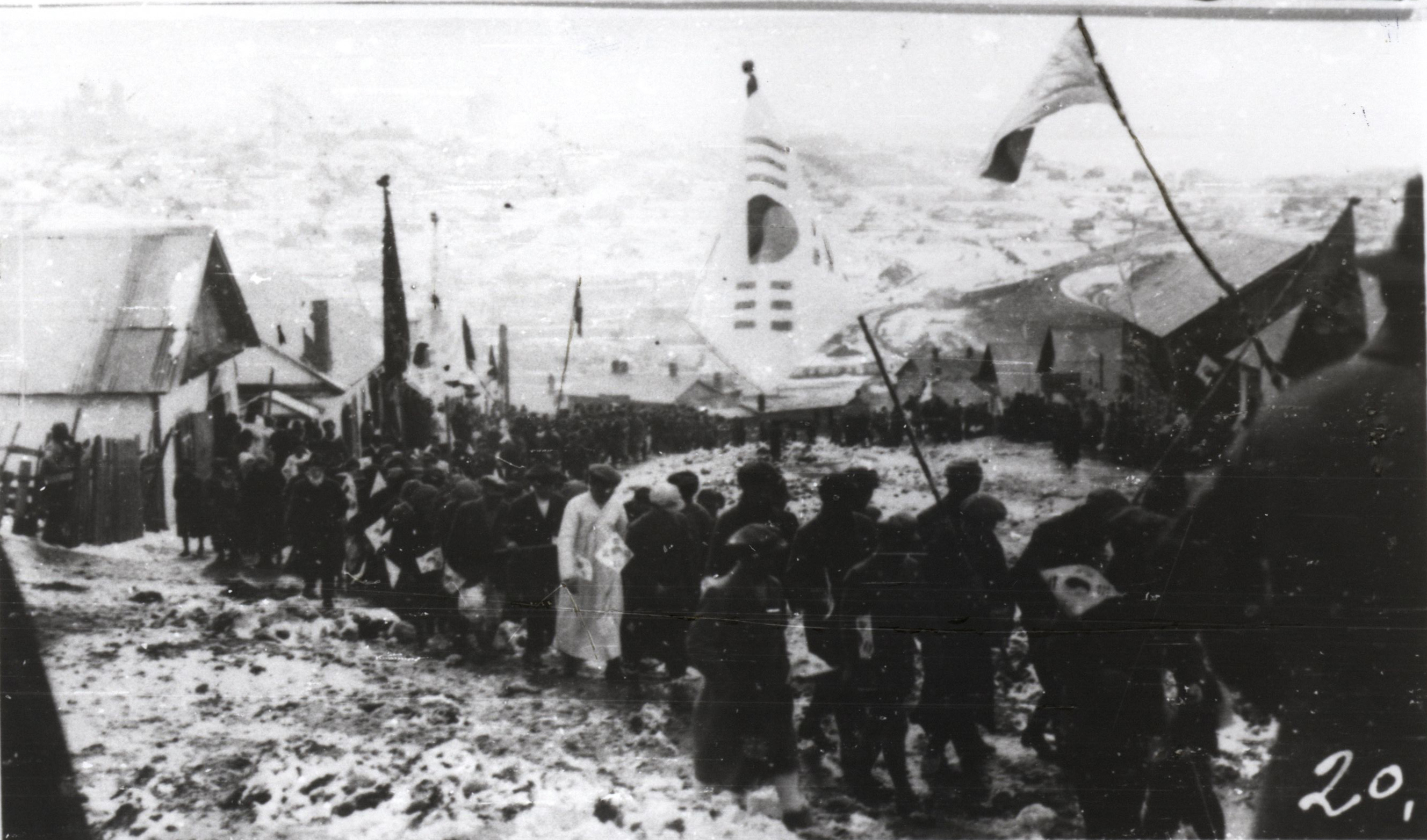
March 1st Movement anniversary protests in Vladivostok (1920)

In the early 20th century, both Russia and Korea came into conflict with Japan. Following the end of the Russo-Japanese War in 1907, Russia enacted an anti-Korean law at the behest of Japan, under which Korean lands were confiscated and Korean workers were let go. However, Korean migration to Russia continued to grow; 1914 figures showed 64,309 Koreans (among whom 20,109 were Russian citizens). Even the 1917 October Revolution did nothing to slow migration; after the repression of the 1919 March First Movement in Korea under Japanese rule, migration actually intensified. Korean leaders in Vladivostok provided support to the independence movement, making it a hub for armed/or unarmed nationalist activities; the Japanese attacked it on April 4, 1920, leaving hundreds dead. By 1923, the Korean population in the Soviet Union had grown to 106,817. The following year, the Soviets began taking measures to control Korean population movement to their territory; however, they were not completely successful until 1931; after that date, they halted all migration from Korea and required existing migrants to naturalize as Soviet citizens.

The Soviet policy of korenizatsiya (Russian: коренизация, romanized: korenizatsiya, pronounced [kərʲɪnʲɪˈzatsɨjə]; transl. "indigenization" or "nativization") resulted in the creation of 105 Korean village soviets (councils) in mixed-nationality raions, as well as an entire raion for the Korean nationality, the Pos'et Korean National Raion; these conducted their activities entirely in the Korean language. The Soviet Koreans had a large number of their own official institutions, including 380 Korean schools, two teachers' colleges, one pedagogical school, one theater, three hospitals, six journals, and seven newspapers (the largest of which, Vanguard, had a circulation of 10,000). The 1937 Census showed 168,259 Koreans in the Soviet Union. However, officials in the Russian Far East viewed the Koreans' ethnic and family ties to the Japanese Empire with suspicion, which would soon set the stage for the deportation of the whole population.

=== Deportation to Central Asia ===
In 1937, facing reports from the People's Commissariat for Internal Affairs (NKVD) that there were possibilities that Japanese could have infiltrated the Russian Far East by means of ethnic Korean spies, Joseph Stalin and Vyacheslav Molotov signed Resolution 1428-326 ss, "On the Exile of the Korean Population from border Raions of the Far East Krai", on August 21. According to the report of Nikolai Yezhov, 36,442 Korean families totaling 171,781 persons were deported by October 25. The deported Koreans faced difficult conditions in Central Asia: monetary assistance promised by the government never materialized, and furthermore, most of the deported were rice farmers and fishermen, who had difficulty adapting to the arid climate of their new home. Estimates based on population statistics suggest that 40,000 deported Koreans died in 1937 and 1938 for these reasons. Nonetheless, the deportees cooperated to build irrigation works and start rice farms; within three years, they had recovered their original standard of living.

The events of this period led to the formation of a cohesive identity among the Korean deportees. However, in schools for Soviet Korean children, the government switched Korean language from being the medium of instruction to being taught merely as a second language in 1939, and from 1945 stopped it from being taught entirely; furthermore, the only publication in the Korean language was the Lenin Kichi (now called Koryo Ilbo). As a result, subsequent generations lost the use of the Korean language, which J. Otto Pohl alleged "emasculat[ed] the expression of Korean culture in the Soviet Union. Up until the era of glasnost, it was not permitted to speak openly of the deportations.

=== Liberation and division of Korea ===
During the Soviet-Japanese War, Koryo-saram Chŏng Sangjin was the only ethnic Korean who had a combat role on the Soviet side. He notably participated in the Seishin Operation. Chŏng and a number of other Koryo-saram joined North Korea after the division of Korea. Some Koryo-saram, including Pak Chang-ok, became key figures in that government, where they formed a faction of Soviet Koreans. However, in the mid-1950s, Kim Il Sung purged many Soviet-aligned Korean people, which led to the expulsion of a number of Koryo-saram from the North. Several of them, including Chŏng, returned to Central Asia and continued writing for the Lenin Kichi.

Following the establishment of Sakhalin Oblast, Koryo-saram would be sent to Sakhalin to establish Korean-language schools for the education of Sakhalin's Korean population, with 2,000 Koryo-saram residing on Sakhalin by 1959. These Korean language schools were then closed in 1963 and supplanted by Russian language ones.

== 2021 status ==
=== Russia ===
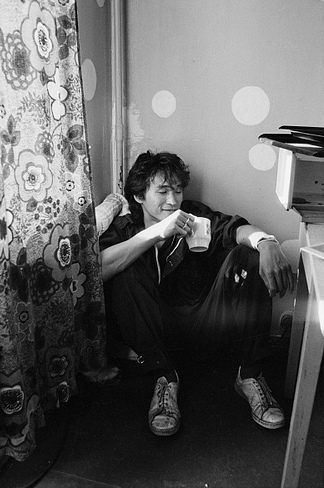
Viktor Tsoi, singer and songwriter who co-founded Kino, one of the most popular and musically influential bands in the history of Russian music

The 2002 census gave a population of 148,556 Koreans in Russia, of which 75,835 were male and 72,721 female. More than half were living in Asian Russia. Meanwhile, the 2010 census gave a population of 153,156 Koreans in Russia, this time more than half were living in European Russia instead, but Russian Far East remained the federal district with highest number of Koreans. The Korean population there trace their roots back to a variety of sources. Aside from roughly 33,000 CIS nationals, mostly migrants retracing in reverse the 1937 deportation of their ancestors, between 4,000 and 12,000 North Korean guest workers can be found in the region. Smaller numbers of South Koreans and ethnic Koreans from China have also come to the region to settle, invest, and/or engage in cross-border trade.

	2002 census	2010 census:	2021 census:
Russian Federation	148,556	153,156	87,819
Number by federal districts			
Central Federal District	16,720	21,779	12,194
Northwestern Federal District	6,903	7,000	4,054
Southern Federal District	39,031	40,191	27,065
Volga Federal District	9,088	12,215	7,455
Ural Federal District	4,071	3,805	2,112
Siberian Federal District	10,797	11,193	5,084
Far Eastern Federal District	61,946	56,973	29,855

=== Ukraine ===
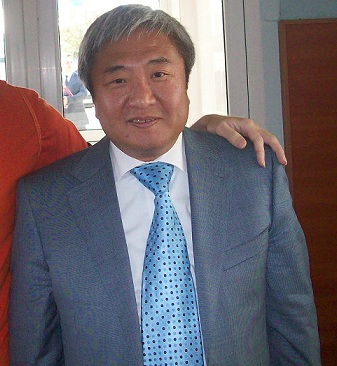
Oleksandr Sin, a mayor of Zaporizhzhia

In the Ukrainian 2001 census, 12,711 people defined themselves as ethnic Koreans, up from 8,669 in 1989. Of these only 17.5% gave Korean as their native language. The majority (76%) named Russian as their native language, while 5.5% named Ukrainian. The largest concentrations can be found in Kharkiv, Kyiv, Odesa, Mykolaiv, Cherkasy, Lviv, Luhansk, Donetsk, Dnipro, Zaporizhzhia and Crimea. The largest ethnic representative body, the Association of Koreans in Ukraine, is located in Kharkiv, where roughly 150 Korean families reside; the first Korean language school was opened in 1996 under their direction. Some of the most famous Korean-Ukrainians are Vitalii Kim, current governor of Mykolaiv Oblast, Pavlo Lee, actor killed in Russo-Ukrainian war, and Oleksandr Sin, former mayor of Zaporizhzhia.

=== Central Asia ===
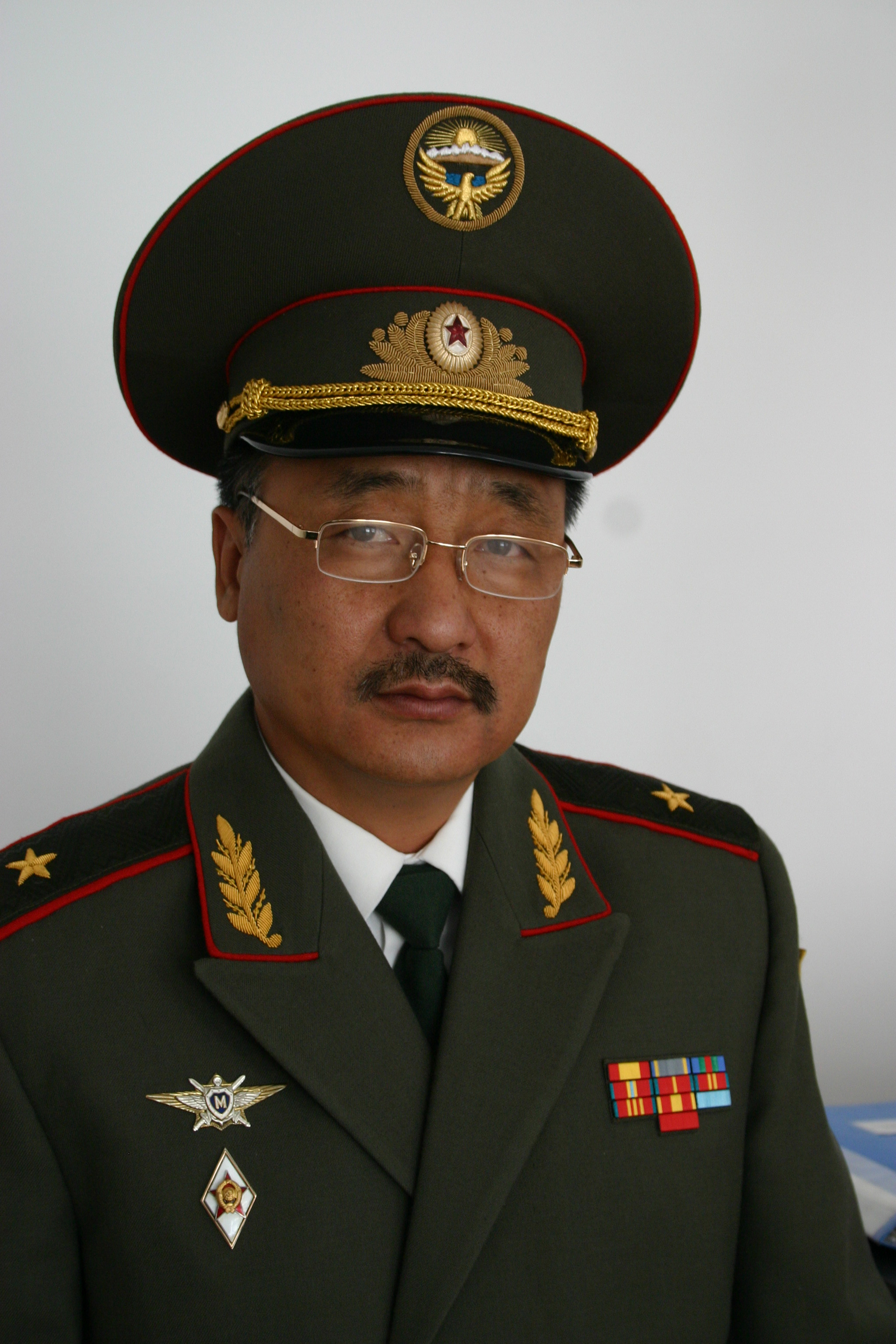
Boris Yugai, a Kyrgyzstani Major General, was a notable member of the Koryo-saram community in Kyrgyzstan.

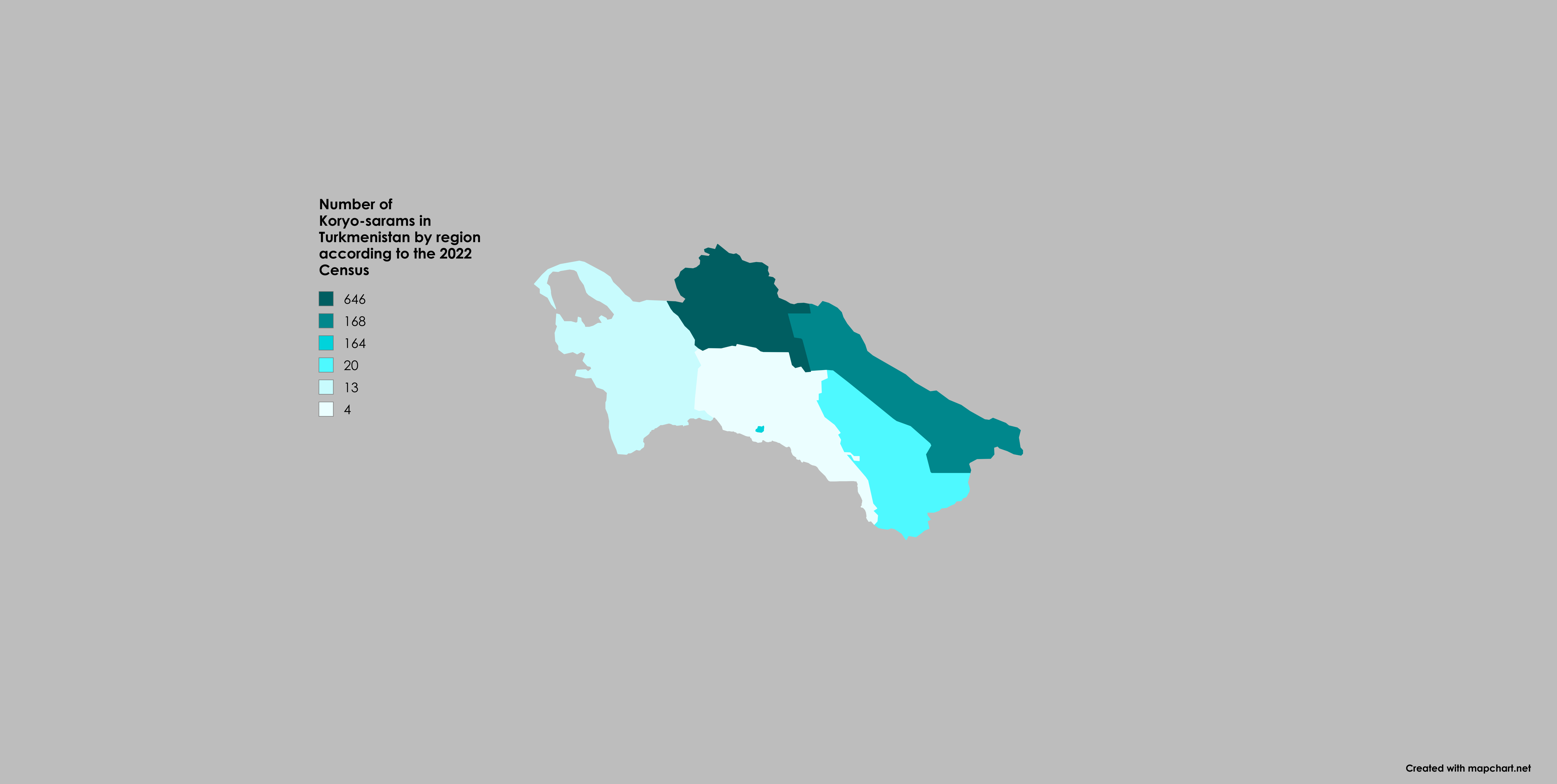
Number of Koryo-saram in Turkmenistan by region

The majority of Koryo-saram in Central Asia reside in Kazakhstan and Uzbekistan. Korean culture in Kazakhstan is centered in Almaty, the former capital. For much of the 20th century, this was the only place in Central Asia where a Korean language newspaper (the Koryo Ilbo) and Korean language theater (the Korean Theater of Kazakhstan) were in operation. The censuses of Kazakhstan recorded 96,500 Koryo-saram in 1939, 74,000 in 1959, 81,600 in 1970, 92,000 in 1979, 100,700 in 1989, and 99,700 in 1999.

In Kyrgyzstan, the population has remained roughly stable over the past three censuses: 18,355 (1989), 19,784 (1999), and 17,299 (2009). This contrasts sharply with other non-indigenous groups such as Germans, many of whom migrated to Germany after the breakup of the Soviet Union. South Korea never made plans to promote return migration of their diaspora in Central Asia, unlike Germany. However, they have established organizations to promote Korean language and culture, such as the Korean Center of Education which opened in Bishkek in 2001. South Korean Christian missionaries are also active in the country.

The population in Uzbekistan is largely scattered in rural areas. This population has suffered in recent years from linguistic handicaps, as the Koryo-saram there spoke Russian but not Uzbek. After the independence of Uzbekistan, many lost their jobs due to being unable to speak the national language . Some emigrated to the Russian Far East, but found life difficult there as well.

There is also a small Korean community in Tajikistan. Mass settlement of Koreans in the country began during the late 1950s and early 1960s, after the loosening of restrictions on their freedom of movement which had previously kept them confined to Uzbekistan and Kazakhstan. Pull factors for migration included rich natural resources and a relatively mild climate. Their population grew to 2,400 in 1959, 11,000 in 1979 and 13,000 in 1989; most lived in the capital Dushanbe, with smaller concentrations in Qurghonteppa and Khujand. Like Koreans in other parts of Central Asia, they generally possessed higher incomes compared to members of other ethnic groups. However, with the May 1992 onset of civil war in Tajikistan, many fled the country; by 1996, their population had fallen by over half to 6,300 people. Most are engaged in agriculture and retail business. Violence continued even after the end of the civil war; in 2000, suspected Hizb ut-Tahrir members exploded a bomb in a Korean Christian church in Dushanbe, killing 9 and wounding 30.

=== Return migration to Korea ===
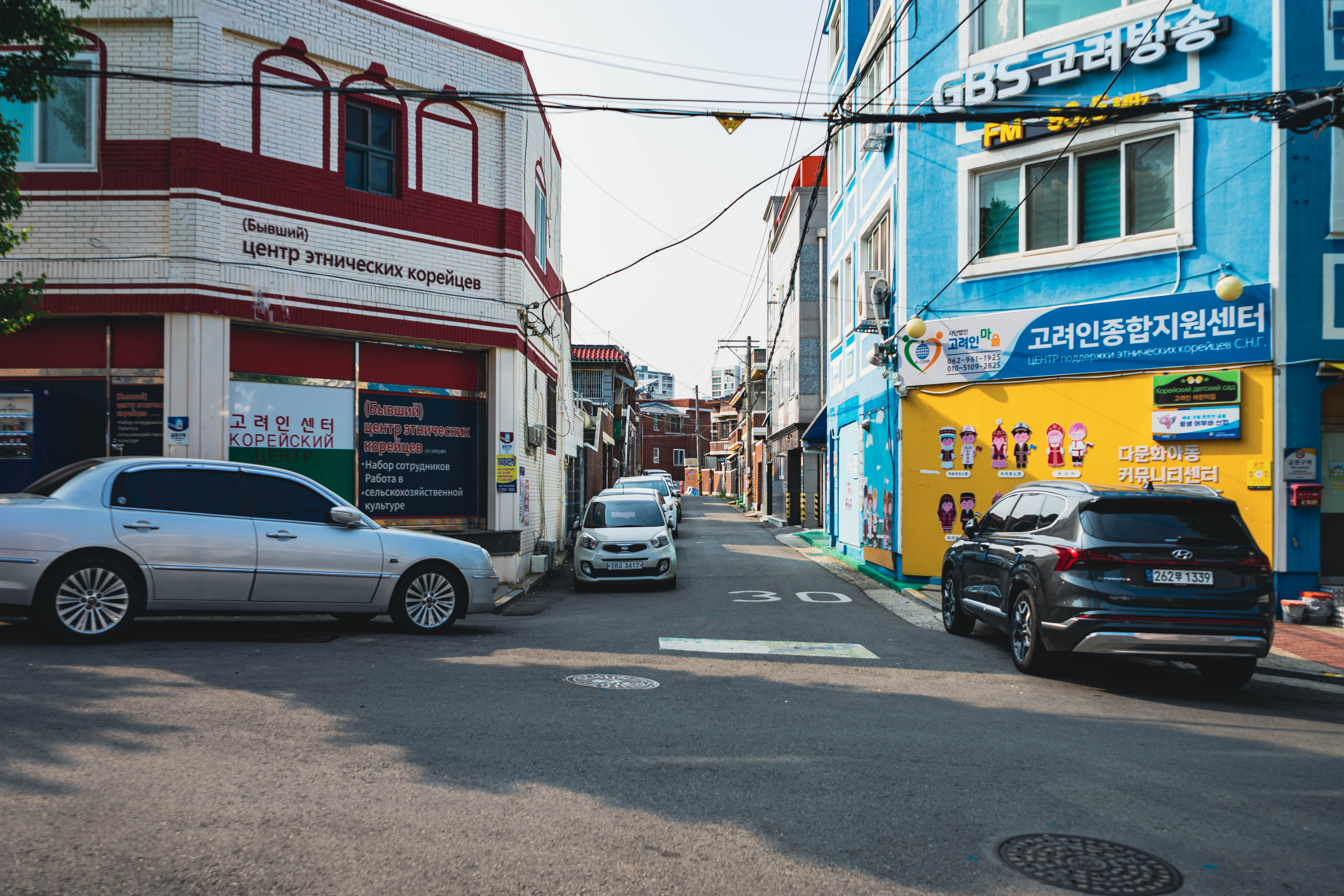
Community centers for Gwangju Koryoin Village, which is one of the largest ethnic enclaves of Koryo-saram in South Korea. (2022)

There was some minor return migration of Soviet Koreans to Korea in the first half of the 20th century. They formed four main groups: those sent for intelligence work during the Japanese colonial period, the Red Army personnel who arrived in 1945–1946, civilian advisors and teachers who arrived in the northern half of the peninsula in 1946–1948 and individuals who repatriated from the Soviet Union to North Korea for personal reasons. Though it was common in most of the newly socialist countries of the Eastern Bloc to receive Soviet-educated personnel who were from the country or had ancestral ethnic connections there, in North Korea such returned members of national diaspora played a more important role than in other countries.

Later, guest worker migration to South Korea swelled. As of 2005, as many as 10,000 Uzbekistani nationals worked in South Korea, with most of them being ethnic Koreans. It is estimated that remittances from South Korea to Uzbekistan exceed $100 million annually.

As of 2022, a number of Koryo-saram communities existed in South Korea, including Ttaetgol Village, Gwangju Koryoin Village, Hambak Village, Texas Street, and Central Asia Street in Seoul. Several of these communities are also host to Russian speakers of other ethnicities.

Koryo-saram have consistently reported feeling social isolation or even employment discrimination when in Korea. The experience of returnees has been portrayed in media, such as the 2011 film Hanaan, by Koryo-saram director Ruslan Pak.

== Culture ==
Religion of Koryo-saram in Kazakhstan
1. Christianity (49.4%)
2. Atheism (28.5%)
3. Buddhism (11.4%)
4. Islam (5.24%)
5. Judaism (0.21%)
6. Others (0.14%)
7. Not Answered (5.16%)

After their arrival in Central Asia, the Koryo-saram quickly established a way of life different from that of neighboring peoples, setting up irrigation works for as rice farming. They interacted little with their nomadic neighbors, instead focused on education. Although they soon ceased to wear traditional Korean clothing, they adopted Western-style dress rather than the clothing worn by the Central Asian peoples.

The ritual life of the Koryo-saram community has changed in various respects. Marriages have taken on the Russian style. At Korean traditional funerals, the coffin is taken out of the house either through the window or a single door threshold; however, if there is more than one door threshold on the way out (e.g. in modern multi-stories buildings), three notches are made on each threshold. The name of the dead is traditionally written in hanja; however, as hardly anyone is left among the Koryo-saram who can write in hanja, the name is generally written in hangul only. On the other hand, the rituals for the first birthday and sixtieth anniversary have been preserved in their traditional form.

In New York City, United States, there is the All Nations Baptist Church, a Russian-speaking Christian church for Koryo-saram.

=== Cuisine ===
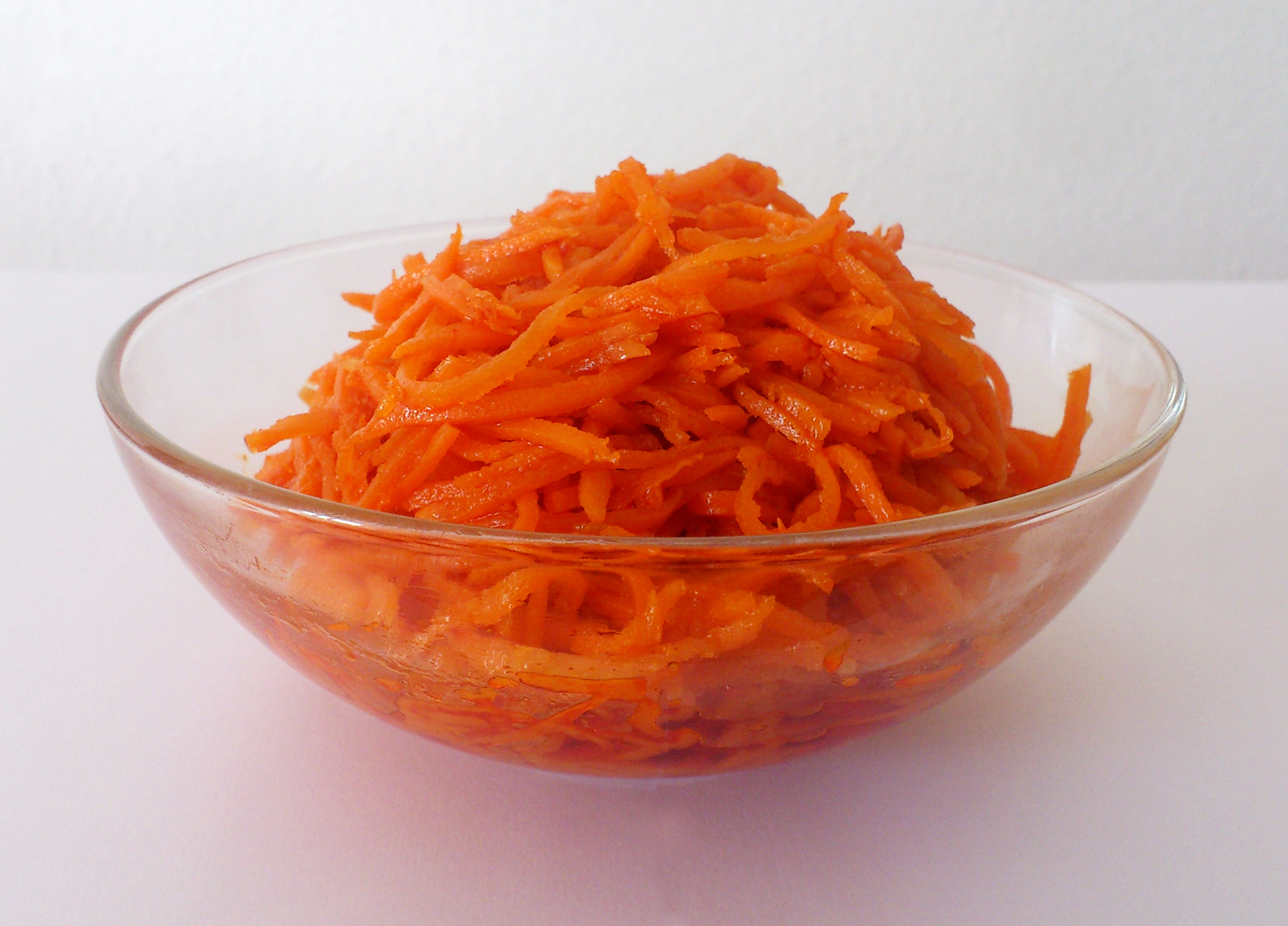
Morkovcha (Korean carrot salad)

The cuisine of the Koryo-saram is closest to that of the Hamgyong provinces in North Korea and is dominated by meat soups and salty side dishes. It uses similar cooking techniques but is adapted to local ingredients, which resulted in invention of new dishes. One well-known example is morkovcha, a variant of kimchi that uses carrots. It has become popular in many parts of the former Soviet Union.

Other examples of dishes include pyanse, kuksu, funchoza, timpeni, khe, chartagi, kadi che (가지채), kosari che, chirgym che, siryak-tyamuri, and kadyuri.

=== Personal and family names ===
Korean surnames in Romanization/Cyrillization
Korean (RR)			Russian (BGN)		Alternative English Spellings
안	安	An	Ан	An	Ahn
배	裵	Bae	Бя; Пягай	Bya; Pyagay	Pae
백	白	Baek	Пэк; Пяк	P∙ek; Pyak	Baik; Paek
박	朴	Bak	Пак	Pak	Park
반	潘	Ban	Пан	Pan	Pahn
방	方 房	Bang	Пан	Pan	Pang; Phang
부	夫 傅	Bu	Пу; Пугай	Pu; Pugay	Booh; Pooh
변	卞 邊	Byeon	Пён	Pyon	Pyoun
차	車	Cha	Ча; Чагай	Cha; Chagay	Char; Tchah
채	蔡	Chae	Цай	Tsay	Chai
천	千	Cheon	Чен	Chen	Choun
최	崔	Choe	Цой; Цхай; Цхой	Tsoy; Tskhay; Tskhoy	Choi; Chey; Choy
엄	嚴	Eom	Эм	Em	Oum
강	姜 康 强 彊 剛	Gang	Кан	Kan	Kang
김	金	Gim	Ким	Kim	Kim
고	高	Go	Ко; Когай	Ko; Kogay	Koh
구	具	Gu	Ку	Ku	Koo
곽	郭	Gwak	Квак	Kvak	Kwak
권	權	Gwon	Кван; Квон	Kvan; Kvon	Kwon
한	韓	Han	Хан	Khan	Hahn
허	許	Heo	Хе; Хегай	Khe; Khegay; Khegai	Huh; Hur
홍	洪	Hong	Хон	Khon	Houng
황	黃	Hwang	Хван	Khvan	Hwang
현	玄	Hyeon	Хён	Khyon	Hyoun
이 리	李	I Ri	И Ли; Лигай; Ни; Нигай	I Li; Ligay; Ni; Nigay	Lee; Rhee; Yi
임 림	林	Im; Rim	Им; Лим	Im; Lim	Rhim; Yim
인	印	In	Ин	In	Yin
장	張	Jang	Тян; Чан	Tyan; Chan	Chang; Jang
전	全 田	Jeon	Тен	Ten	Chun; Jun
정	鄭 丁	Jeong	Тен; Чжен	Ten; Chzhen	Chung; Tseung
지	池 智	Ji	Ти; Тигай	Ti; Tigay	Chi; Jee
진	陳	Jin	Чен	Chen	Chin
조	趙 曺	Jo	Дё; Тё	Dyo; Tyo	Cho
주	朱 周	Ju	Дю; Дюгай; Дзю; Тюгай; Цзю	Dyu; Dyugay; Dzyu; Tyugay; Tszyu	Chu
마	馬 麻	Ma	Ма; Магай	Ma; Magay	Mar; Mha
맹	孟	Maeng	Мян	Myan	Maeing
민	閔	Min	Мин	Min	Mhin
문	門 文	Mun	Мун	Mun	Moon
명	明	Myeong	Мён	Myon	Myoung
나 라	羅	Na; Ra	На; Ра	Na; Ra	La; Rha
남	南	Nam	Нам	Nam	Nahm
노 로	盧 魯 路	No; Ro	Но; Ногай; Ро	No; Nogay; Ro	Nho; Noh; Rho
오	伍 吳	O	О Огай	O Ogay	Au; Oe; Oh
유	兪 劉	Yu	Ю Югай	Yu; Yugay	Yoo; You
류	柳	Ryu	Ю Югай, Люгай	Yu; Yugay, Lyugay	Ryoo; Ryou
서	徐	Seo	Ше; Шегай	She; Shegay	So; Sur
석	石 昔	Seok	Шек	Shek	Suk
설	薛 偰	Seol	Шер	Sher	Sol; Sull
성	成	Seong	Сен	Sen	Song
심	沈	Sim	Сим; Шим	Sim; Shim	Seem; Sheem
신	申 辛 愼	Sin	Син; Шин	Sin; Shin	Seen; Sheen
손	孫	Son	Сон	Son	Sohn
송	宋	Song	Сон	Son	Sung
태	太	Tae	Тхай; Тхя	Tkhay; Tkhya	Tai; Tay
우	禹	U	У Угай	U Ugay	Ou; Woo
왕	王	Wang	Ван	Van	(none)
원	元	Won	Вон	Von	Woon
양 량	梁	Yang; Ryang	Лян; Рян; Ян	Lyan; Ryan; Yan	Lyang; Ryang; Yaung
여 려	余 呂 汝	Yeo; Ryeo	Ё Ёгай	Yo; Yogay	Yea; Yo; Yu
염 렴	廉	Yeom; Ryeom	Ём; Лём	Yom; Lyom	Yeoum
연 련	延 燕 連	Yeon; Ryeon	Ён	Yon	Yeoun
윤	尹	Yun	Юн	Yun	Yoon

Many Korean surnames, when Cyrillized, are spelled and pronounced slightly differently from English-based romanizations. and the resulting common pronunciations, as can be seen in the table at right. Some surnames of Koryo-saram have a particle "gai" added to them, such as Kogai or Nogai. The origin of this is unclear. The introduction of international passports by newly independent CIS countries, resulted in further differences in pronunciation as Korean surnames had to be transliterated from Cyrillic into Latin. In addition to a surname, Koreans also use clan names (known as bongwan in Korea and pronounced as пой among Koryo-saram) denoting the place of origin.

Korean naming practices and Russian naming practices are different – Koryo-saram use Russian name practices, but Korean surnames and sometimes Korean names. But most often Christian names are used from the saints of the Russian Orthodox Church, typical for Russians.

==== Patronymics ====
Legislation of the Russian Empire in issuing documents required the father's name.

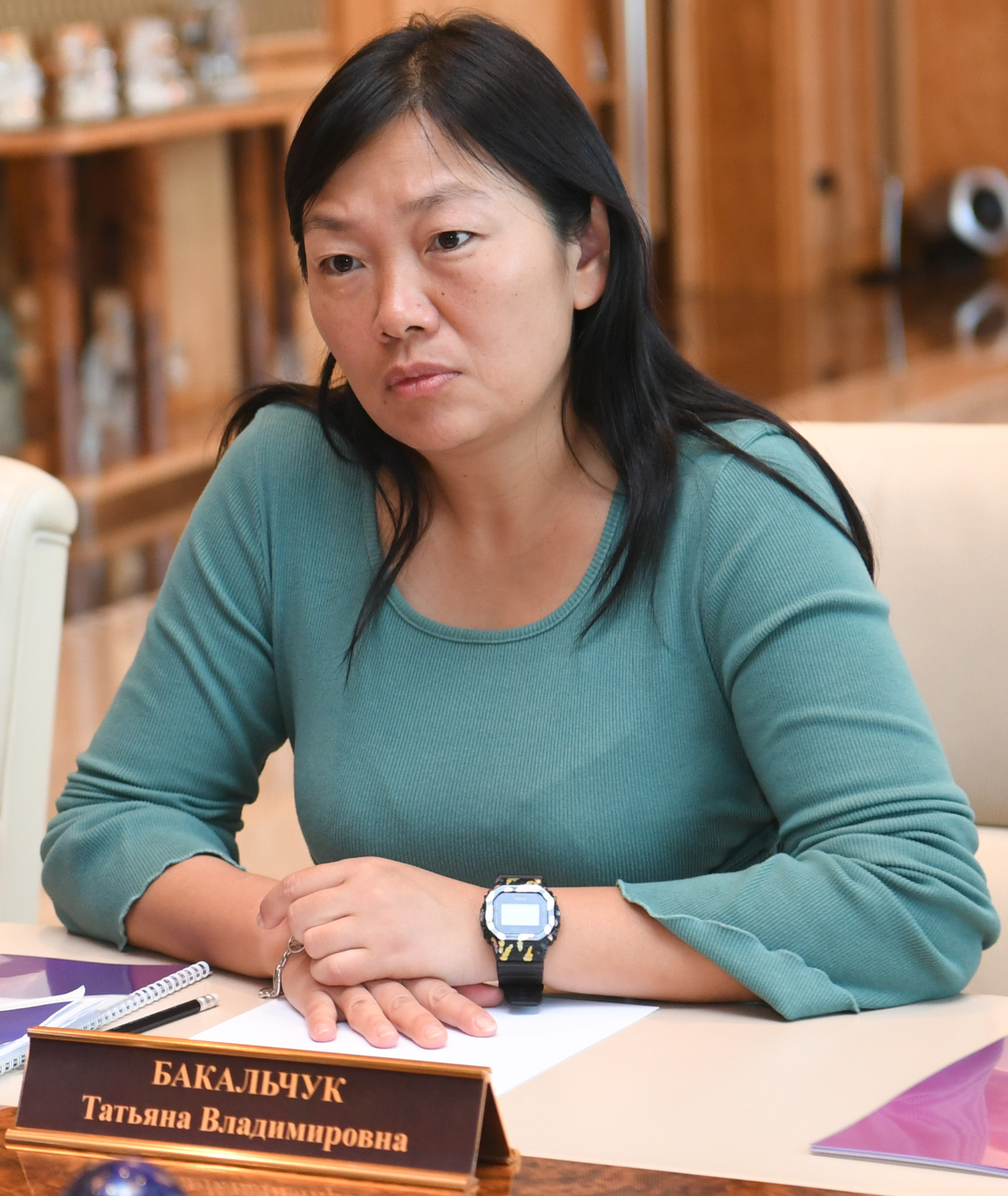
Tatyana Kim is founder and CEO of Wildberries, Russia's largest online retailer, and the country's first self-made woman billionaire. (photo with old surname before returning to née surname Kim)

Koreans began with the use of patronymics that were formed from the Korean names of their fathers. Over time, as the proportion of Christians increased, Koreans were given, in accordance with the tradition of the Russian Orthodox Church, names from the general list of revered saints.

Currently, 80% of Koryo-saram have a record of their Korean names. This differs from the pattern typical in the US, where Korean American parents often register their children with a Korean given name as their legal middle name (e.g. Daniel Dae Kim, Harold Hongju Koh).

==== Surnames of married women ====
In Korea, until the 20th century, women were generally called by their family name. Nobles received as a pseudo-name the name of the estate in which they lived and this did not change when getting married.

The preservation of his wife's name has been preserved as a tradition among modern Koreans, after women began to be given names.

The Koreans began to migrate to the Russian Empire in 1864 long before women were allowed to be given names in modern Korean tradition in Korea.

Legislation of the Russian Empire required the mandatory presence of the surname and patronymic name for everyone, including poor serf wives. When they were married they were given the surname of the husband, a patronymic formed on behalf of the father and given a name from the Sviatcy (List of names of saints of the Orthodox Church).

==== Generation names ====
In Korea, it is common for siblings and cousins of the same generation to have one hanja syllable in common among all of their names; this is known as dollimja. Russians have no equivalent practice, although they do have patronyms which the Koryo-saram have for the most part adopted. Therefore, Koryo-saram do not use generation names. They use, depending on religion, either a name from Sviatcy or a name arbitrarily chosen from the hanja character used in Korea to form names.

=== Language ===
Languages among the Soviet Union's Korean population
	1970	1979	1989
Total population	357,507	388,926	438,650
Korean L1	245,076	215,504	216,811
Russian L1	111,949	172,710	219,953
Russian L2	179,776	185,357	189,929
Other L2	6,034	8,938	16,217

Due to deportation and the continuing urbanization of the population after 1952, the command of Korean among the Koryo-saram has continued to fall. This contrasts with other more rural minority groups such as the Dungan, who have maintained a higher level of proficiency in their ethnic language. In 1989, the most recent year for which data are available, the number of Russian mother tongue speakers among the Koryo-saram population overtook that of Korean mother tongue speakers.

== Tourism ==
There are a number of places in multiple countries that can be visited to learn about Koryo-saram history and culture. Korean Cultural Centers throughout the former Soviet Union, such as the one in Ussuriysk, Russia, offer cultural experiences and sometimes museums on Koryo-saram and Korean history. In Uzbekistan, most Koreans live in Tashkent or in Upper Chirchik District, where prominent Uzbek-Korean kolkhozs such as Politotdel and Polyarnaya Zvezda are located. There is a Seoul section constructed to reminisce a Korean palace in the Tashkent Friendship Park, which has a memorial dedicated to the events of the Deportation. The local Korean community's cultural and education needs are typically served by the Association of Korean Cultural Centers and South Korean government-run Korean Education Center in Tashkent. In Kazakhstan there is a number of places. In Ushtobe, there is a Kazakhstan–Korea Friendship Park that marks where the Koryo-saram first settled in Kazakhstan. It has a Korean cemetery and memorials for Koryo-saram figures. Also in Ushtobe, the Karatal Korean History Center has a museum with authentic houses and historical materials on display. In Almaty, there is the Korean Theater of Kazakhstan, where one can watch plays in Korean with Russian subtitles. In South Korea, one can visit the various enclaves they live in, as well as visit a history museum in Gwangju Koryoin Village. In New York City, United States, the restaurant Cafe Lily is operated by Koryo-saram, and serves Koryo-saram cuisine.

== See also ==
- Deportation of Koreans in the Soviet Union
- Dungan, the Turkic name for Hui Chinese who settled in Central Asia.
- Korean diaspora
- Koreans in Kamchatka
- List of Koryo-saram
- Russians in Korea
- North Korea–Russia relations
- Russia–South Korea relations
- Workers' Party of Korea, whose predecessors were founded by Korean nationalists in exile in the Soviet Union.
