= Morkovcha =

Koryo-saram spicy marinated carrot dish

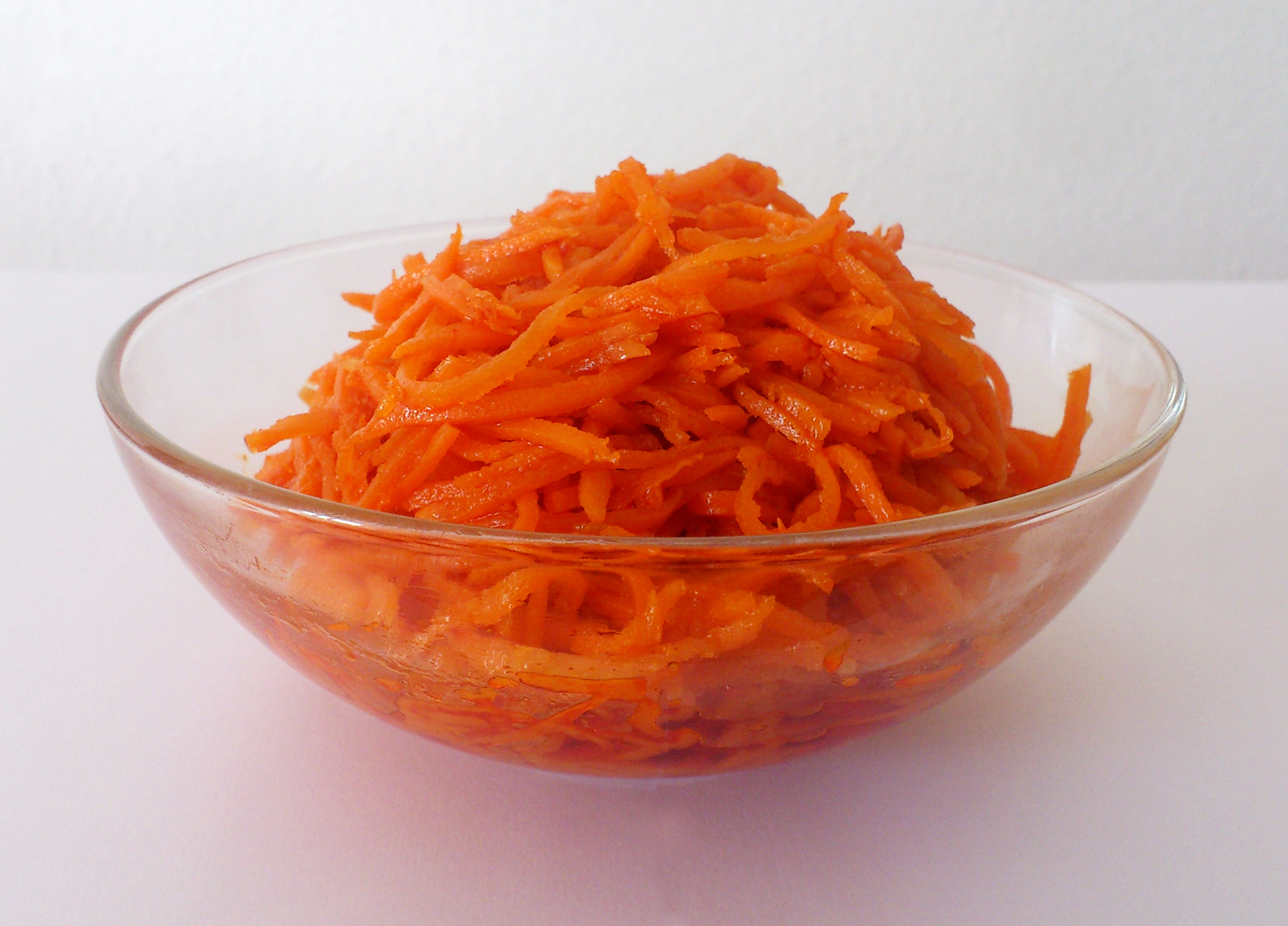
Morkovcha served plain

Morkovcha (Note: UK: /mɔːrˈkɒftʃə/ mor-KOF-chə; US: /mɔːrˈkoʊvtʃə/ mor-KOHV-chə) (Note: Koryo-mar: 마르코프차, Cyrillic: марковча, pronounced [mɐɾɯ̆kʰobɯ̆ˈtɕʰɐ]; Russian: морковча, romanized: morkovča, IPA: [mərkɐfˈtɕa]) also known as Korean-style carrots (Note: Russian: морковь по-корейски, romanized: morkovj po-korejski, IPA: [mɐrˈkofʲ pə‿kɐˈrʲejskʲɪ]; Uzbek: Корейс услубида тайёрланган сабзи, romanized: Koreys uslubida tayyorlangan sabzi) or Korean carrot salad, (Note: Uzbek: корейсча сабзили салат, romanized: koreyscha sabzili salat) is a spicy marinated carrot salad. It is a dish in Koryo-saram cuisine, and is a variant of banchan.

== History ==
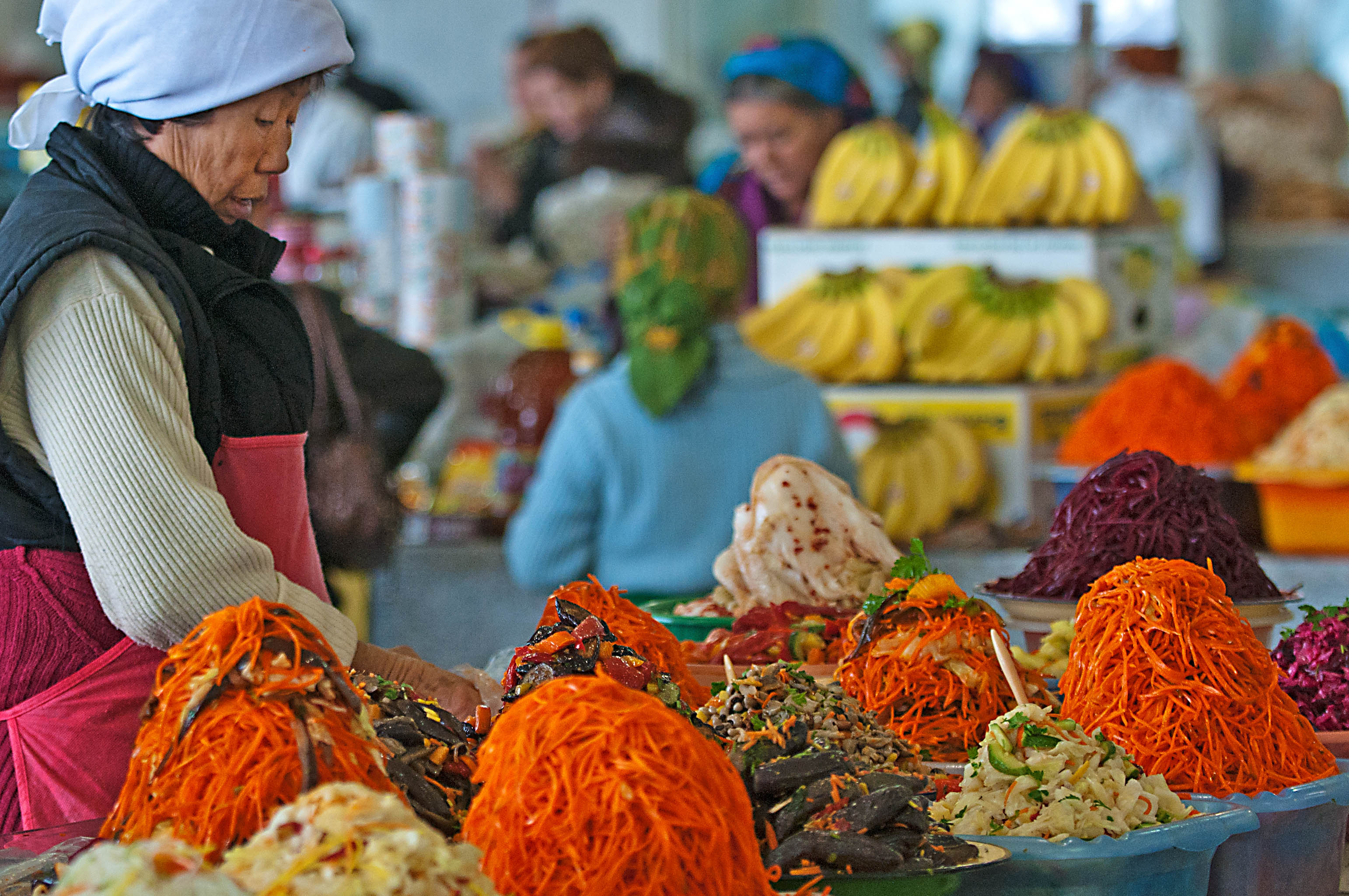
Morkovcha and other salads at Tolkuchka Bazaar, Turkmenistan

Koryo-saram (ethnic Koreans located in post-Soviet countries) created the dish as they lacked access to traditional ingredients and root vegetables following their deportation of 1937 to Central Asia. In the region, where many Koryo-saram have lived since the deportation, the salad is also named morkovcha, which is a combination of Russian morkov ("carrot") and Koryo-mar cha (derived from Korean chae 채 meaning salad-type banchan).

Food historians and ethnographers highlight two primary culinary origins for the salad:

- The Doraji Hypothesis: The salad was crafted to replicate doraji-muchim (도라지무침), a traditional banchan made from seasoned balloon flower roots (locally known in the Koryo-mar dialect as tarodi or taradi). Since the original root is prepared by scrubbing with salt and splitting it lengthwise into fibrous strips, the shredded carrot precisely mimicked its unique crunchy texture and visual presentation.
- The Kkakdugi Hypothesis: The dish developed as a substitute for kkakdugi (깍두기) or mu-saengchae (무생채), which are popular varieties of salad and kimchi made from Korean radish (mu). When traditional Korean radish proved unavailable in local Soviet markets, Koryo-saram adapted the recipe using the region's abundant carrots, shifting the preservation process from long-term fermentation to quick oil-and-vinegar marinating.

The salad was unknown in South Korea until recently, when Russo-Koreans' return migration as well as Russian and Central Asian immigration became common. However, it has gained an international following, being served in most cafeterias throughout post-Soviet countries, sold in many supermarkets, and featured regularly as an appetizer (zakuska) and a side dish on dinner tables and in holiday feasts set by all ethnicities of the former Soviet Union.

== Ingredients ==
The typical ingredients are finely julienned carrots, garlic, onion, ground red pepper, ground coriander seeds, vinegar, vegetable oil (or olive oil), salt and pepper. It may also include sesame seeds.

== See also ==
- Funchoza – another Koryo-saram dish, a variant of japchae
- List of carrot dishes
- Pickling
