= 14 Carrot Cafe =

Restaurant in Seattle, Washington, U.S.

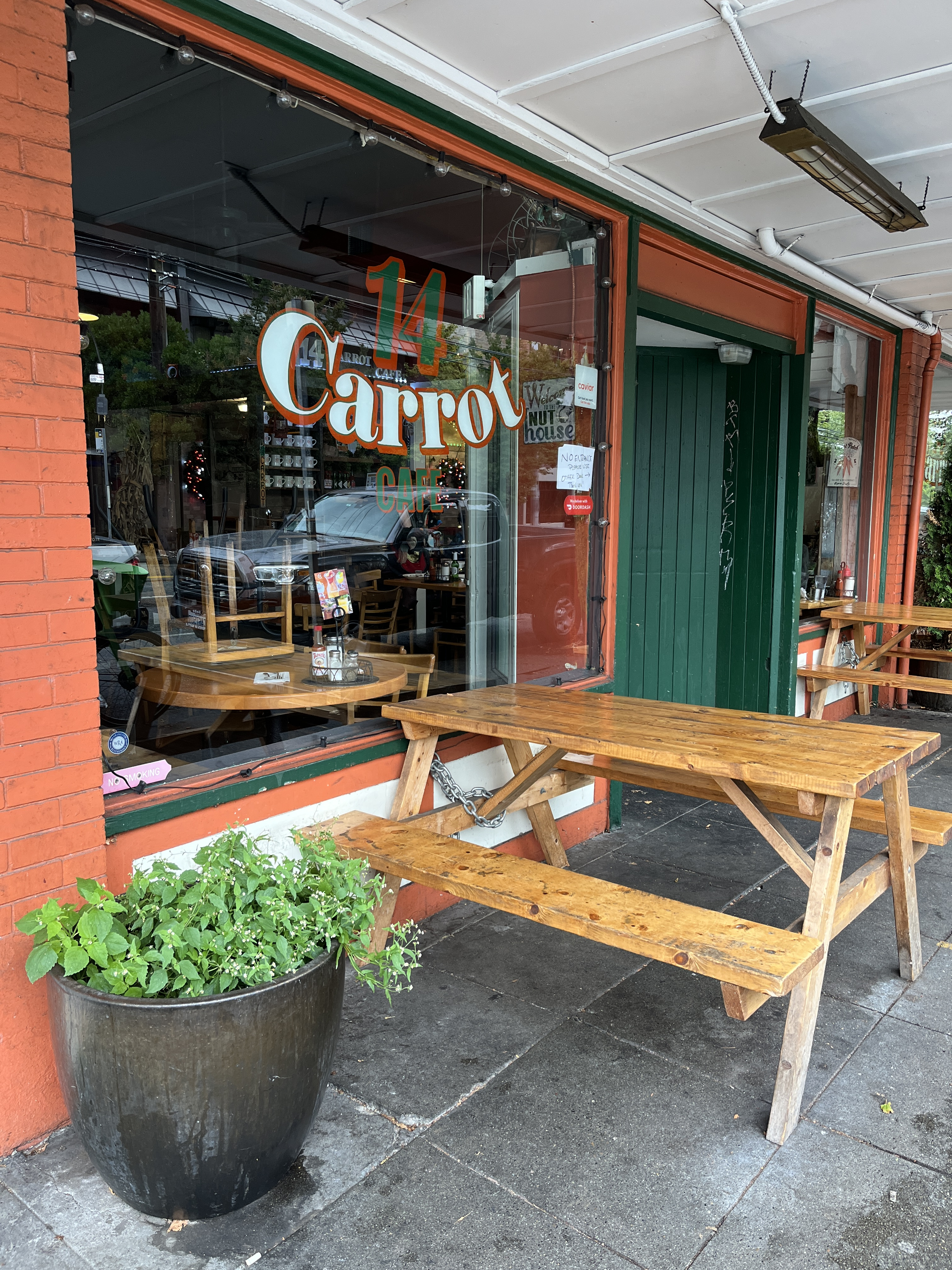
- The restaurant's exterior, 2024
- Interactive map of 14 Carrot Cafe

Restaurant information
- Established: 1977; 49 years ago
- Food type: American
- Location: 2305 Eastlake Ave E, Seattle, King, Washington, 98102, United States
- Coordinates: 47.639922°N 122.326052°W

14 Carrot Cafe is a restaurant in Seattle's Eastlake neighborhood, in the U.S. state of Washington. It opened in 1977.

== Description ==
14 Carrot Cafe is a family-operated restaurant serving American cuisine for breakfast and lunch in the Hines Public Market Building on Eastlake Avenue, near the intersection with East Lynn Street, in Seattle's Eastlake neighborhood. The Infatuation's Aimee Rizzo has described 14 Carrot Cafe as a diner and a greasy spoon that is "charming in a nothing's-been-updated-since-1977 kind of way, based on the old photo collages, vintage dining tables, and coin-operated Runts dispensers that definitely nobody uses". The menu has included biscuits and gravy, cinnamon rolls, egg dishes, "Tahitian" French toast with tahini, crab cake benedicts, hash browns, carrot cake and carrot pancakes, as well as mimosas and carrot juice.

== History ==
The restaurant opened in 1977. In 2009, 14 Carrot Cafe hosted the street food startup Tako Truk.

== Reception ==
The Not for Tourists Guide to Seattle says of 14 Carrot Cafe: "Typical breakfast fare that's, well, typical. Popular anyway." 14 Carrot Cafe was included in USA Today's 2017 list of Seattle's ten best cafes.
