= Carrot salad =

Salad made with carrots

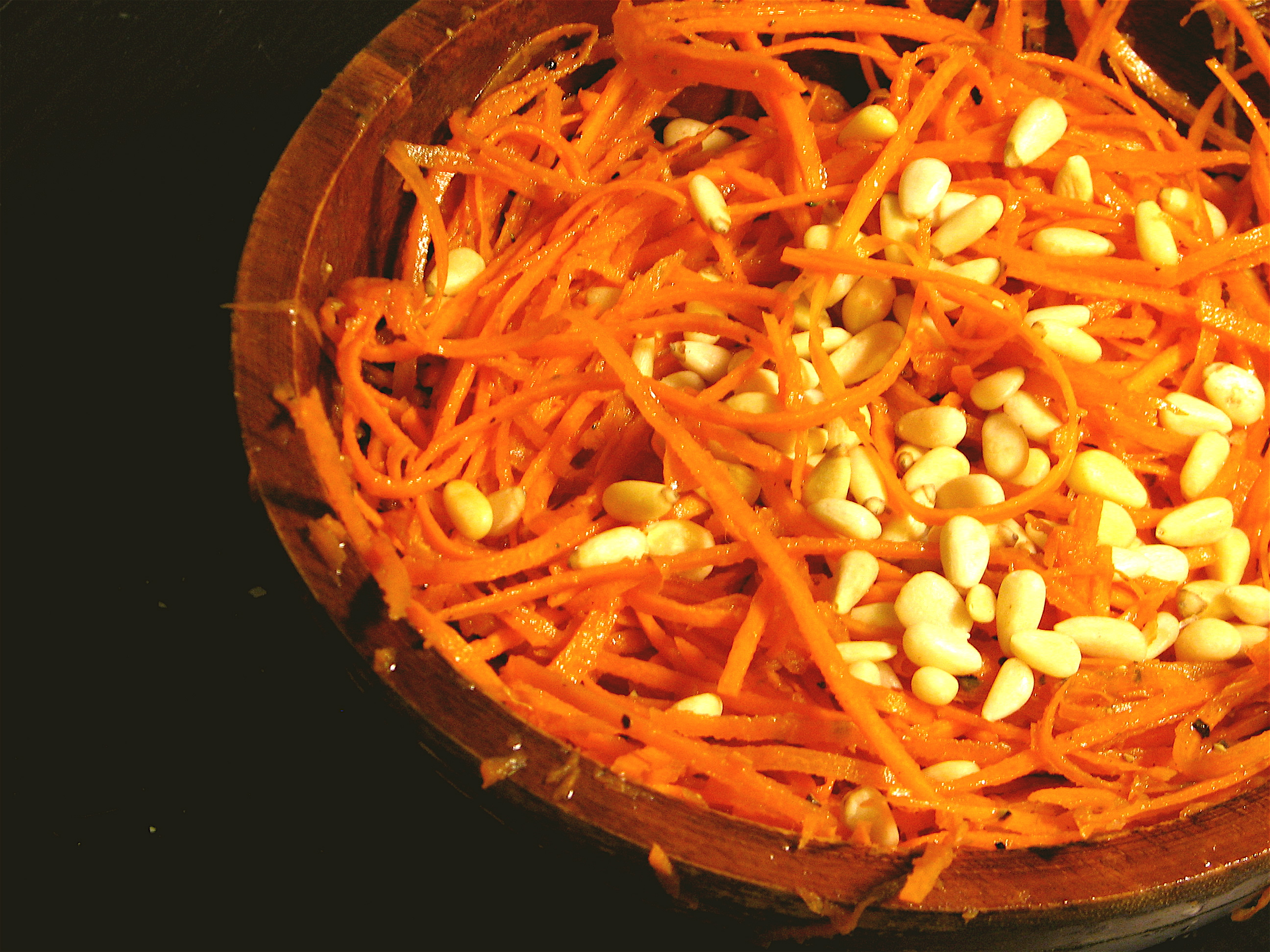
Nest of carrot salad

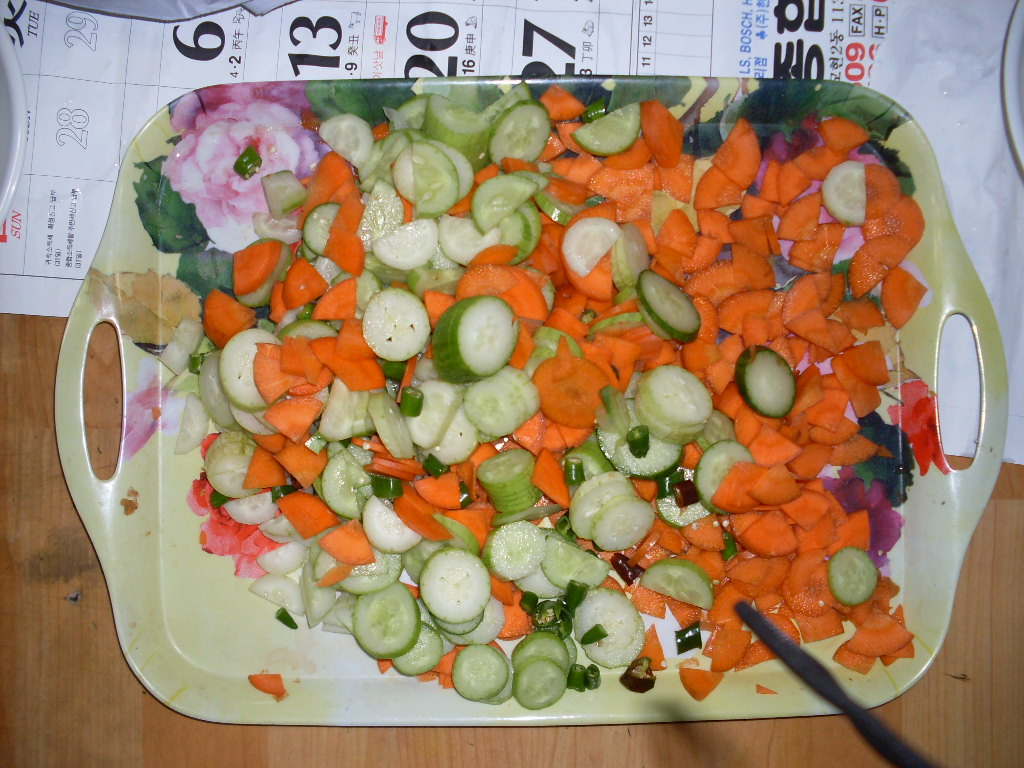
Cucumber and carrot salad

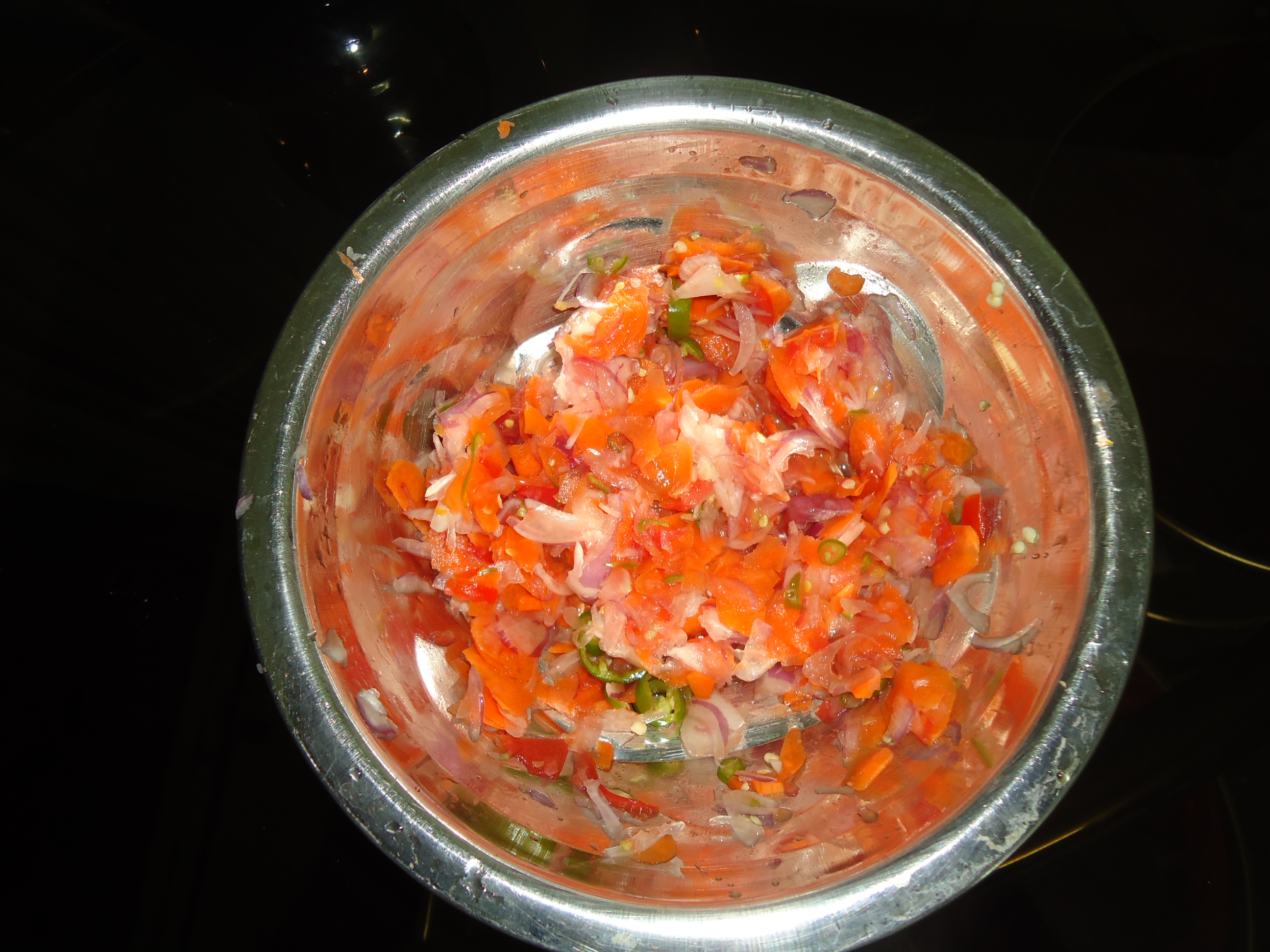
Carrot and onion salad

Carrot salad is a salad made with carrots. Recipes for carrot salad vary widely by regional cuisine. Shredded carrot is often used. Shredded carrot salads are often used as a topping for other dishes.

== By country ==
=== America ===
"Carrot raisin salad" is a traditional dish in the Southern United States. Grated carrot is mixed with raisins, mayonnaise dressing, granulated sugar, salt and black pepper.

Another carrot salad eaten in America is Shredded carrot and serrano chili salad, a savory dish that include ingredients like peanuts, scallions, sesame oil, garlic and lime juice.

In Brazilian cuisine, churrasco service often includes potato salad and carrot salad made with mayonnaise, raw onion, green peas, sweetcorn or sometimes chayote squashes.

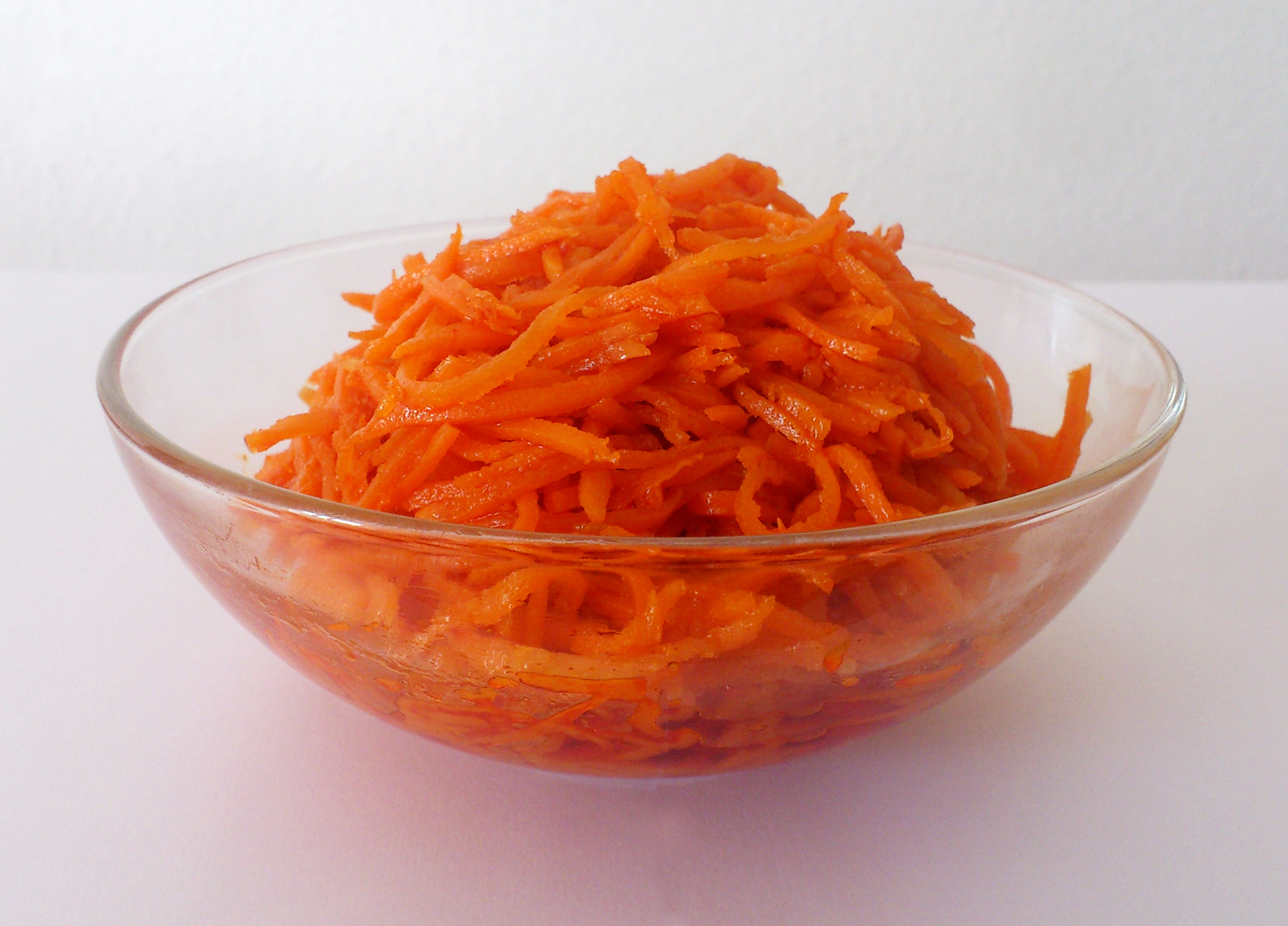
Morkovcha (spicy Korean-style carrot salad) from Koryo-saram cuisine

=== Asia ===
The Koryo-saram, ethnic Koreans in the post-Soviet Union states, popularized spicy pickled carrot salad, known throughout the Soviet Union as Korean-style carrots. It is said to have been unknown in South Korea until recently, but has gained an international following and is served in many cafeterias throughout the CIS where it is also sold in supermarkets, and featured regularly as a side dish on dinner tables and at holiday feasts set by many ethnicities of the former Soviet Union.

In Russia, doner kebab often includes carrot salad as an accompaniment to the meat.

In India, carrot salads are often made with grated carrots are cooked with mustard seeds and green chillies in hot oil.

=== Europe ===
In Bulgarian cuisine a salad with carrots and cabbage is traditional.

Carrot salad is eaten across the Middle East most commonly by mixing carrots with parsley and lemon juice.

Surówka z Marchewki is a Polish cuisine carrot salad made with carrots, Granny Smith apple, lemon juice, sunflower oil or vegetable oil, salt, and sugar.

In France, carottes râpées (or salade de carottes râpées) is a grated carrot salad made with whole-grain mustard.

Tzimmes is an Ashkenazi Jewish sweet side dish that originated in Germany, and it is eaten either cold, or warm. Its main ingredients are carrots, and there are many recipe variations that may include sweet potatoes, prunes, apricots, honey, brown sugar and honey.

=== Africa ===
Houria is a cooked, and often mashed, carrot salad in Tunisian cuisine.

In Morocco, carrot salad is made by mixing cooked carrots with lemon juice and cumin and oftentimes herbs and garlic.

Macedonia is a dish that was represented in the 1940s and 1950s in north Africa and Québec (Québec City especially) with cans "de la macédoine" of diced carrots and peas.

== See also ==
- List of carrot dishes
- List of salads
