= Carrot soup =

Soup prepared with carrot as a primary ingredient

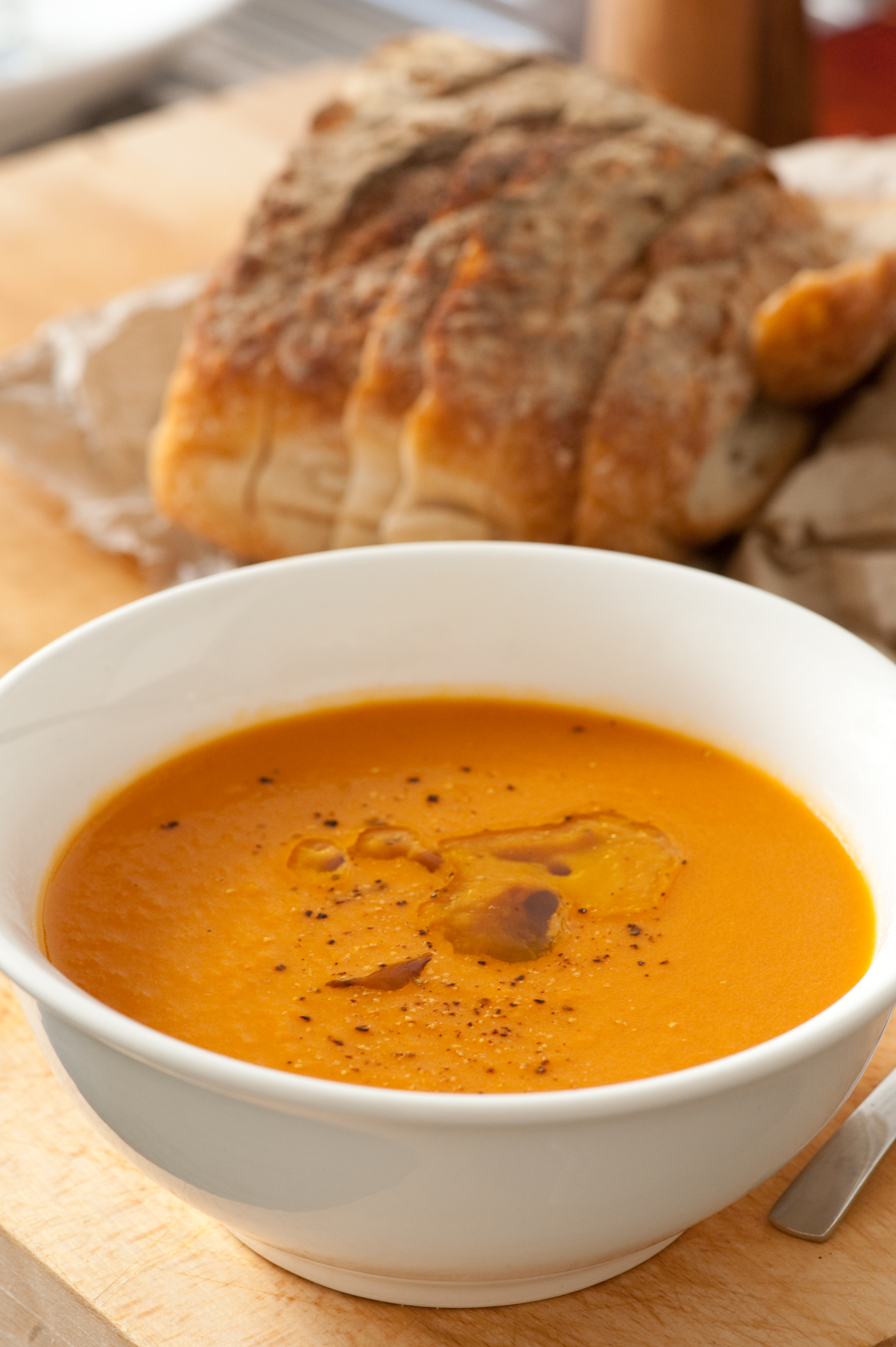
A cream of carrot soup with loaf

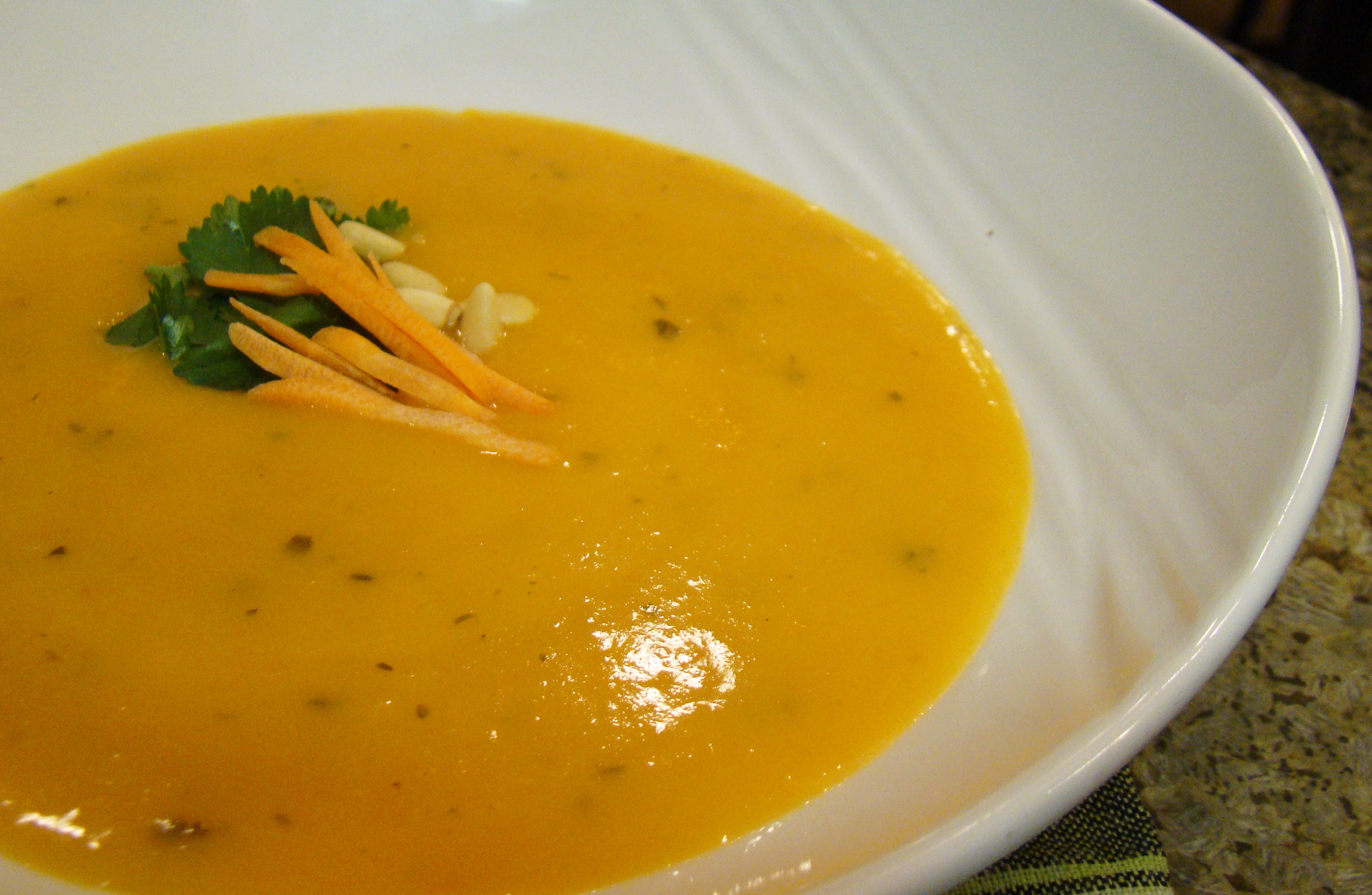
A cream of carrot soup

Carrot soup (referred to in French as potage de Crécy, potage Crécy, potage à la Crécy, purée à la Crécy and crème à la Crécy) is a soup prepared with carrot as a primary ingredient. It can be prepared as a cream- or broth-style soup. Additional vegetables, root vegetables and various other ingredients can be used in its preparation. It may be served hot or cold, and several recipes exist.

Carrot soup has been described as a "classic" dish in French cuisine.

== Overview ==
Carrot soup can be prepared as a cream-style soup and as a broth-style soup. Vegetable stock or chicken stock can be used as ingredients in both styles of soup. Other vegetables may be used in the dish, including root vegetables, the latter of which may include garlic, onion, shallot, potato, turnip and others. Carrot juice and orange juice can be used in its preparation, and some versions are prepared using puréed carrot. After cooking, the dish can be run through a sieve to strain it. The carrots used can be peeled or unpeeled, and the use of peeled carrots can lend to increased smoothness in puréed versions of the dish. Those prepared with puréed carrot may have a thick consistency while also being smooth in texture. The soup's color can vary based upon the coloration of the carrots used. Young carrots tend to make the soup sweeter and imbue it with a bright orange coloration, while older, larger carrots provide less sweetness and may imbue a yellow coloration. The use of old, cracked carrots that have a woody texture in their interior can produce a soup of inferior quality.

Several ingredient variations exist in carrot soup preparations. Some carrot soups are prepared using coconut milk, coconut water, coconut cream, coconut butter or coconut pieces. Some versions include ginger as an ingredient, and some include curry. Green carrot leaves (greens) from the top of carrots can be used as an ingredient in the dish. Chopped mint leaves are used in some versions. It can be served hot or chilled. Salt and pepper can be used to season the dish, and nutmeg is sometimes used as a seasoning. It is sometimes topped with yoghurt, a yoghurt sauce, crème fraîche, sour cream, and other ingredients.

In the United Kingdom, a distinct soup variety much more popular than plain carrot soup is carrot and coriander soup, made with coarsely chopped or grated carrot, garlic and coriander (cilantro) seeds.

The zest of orange can be used as a garnish, as an ingredient within the dish itself, and in both ways. Additional garnishes can include dill, carrot leaves, grated, minced or diced carrot, chives, other fresh, chopped herbs, croutons, and toast squares, among others. Carrot soup can be prepared as a vegan food, and can also be prepared as a bisque.

Carrot soup may contain a significant amount of nitrate.

Carrot soups

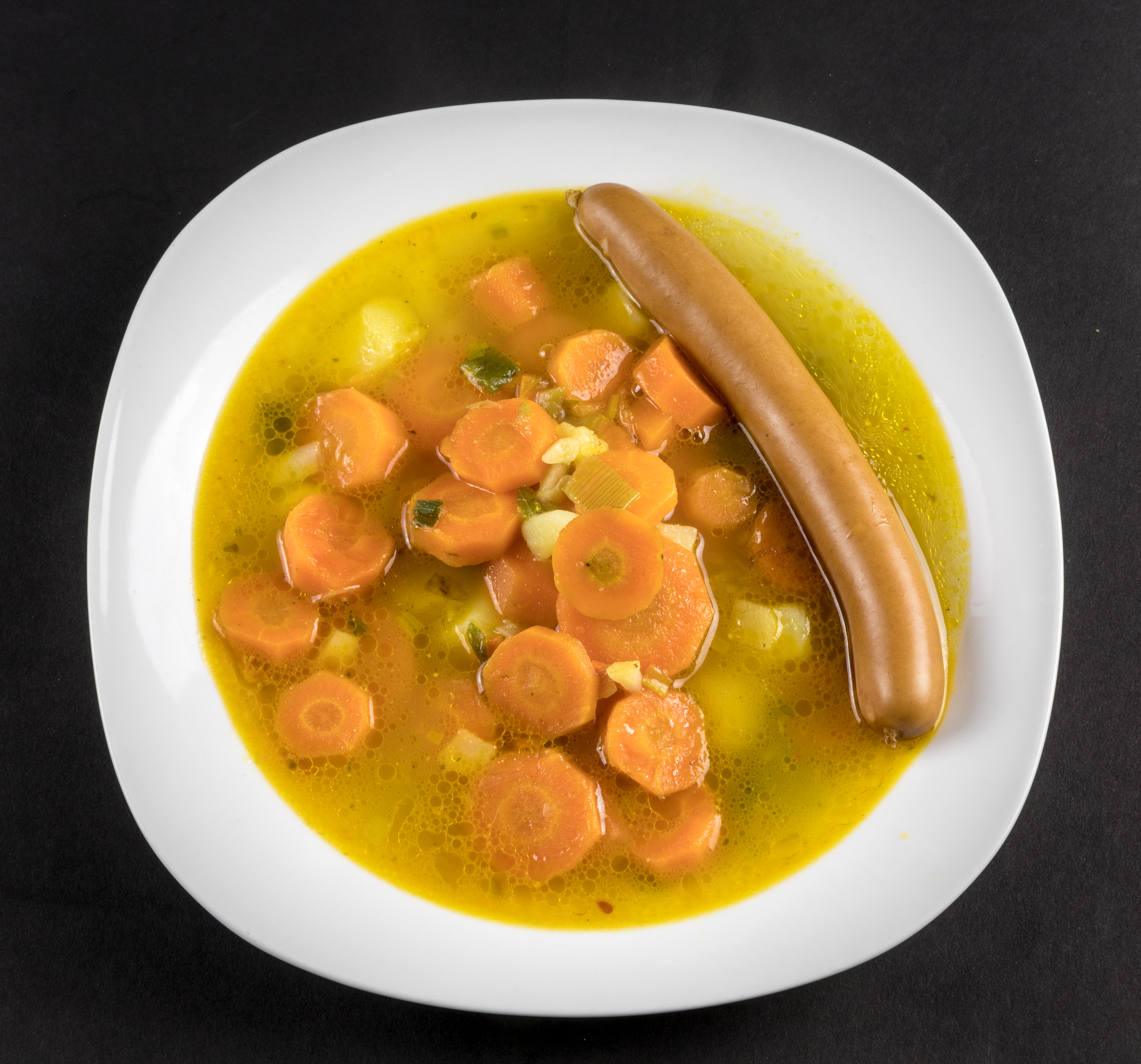
Carrot-potato soup with German sausage

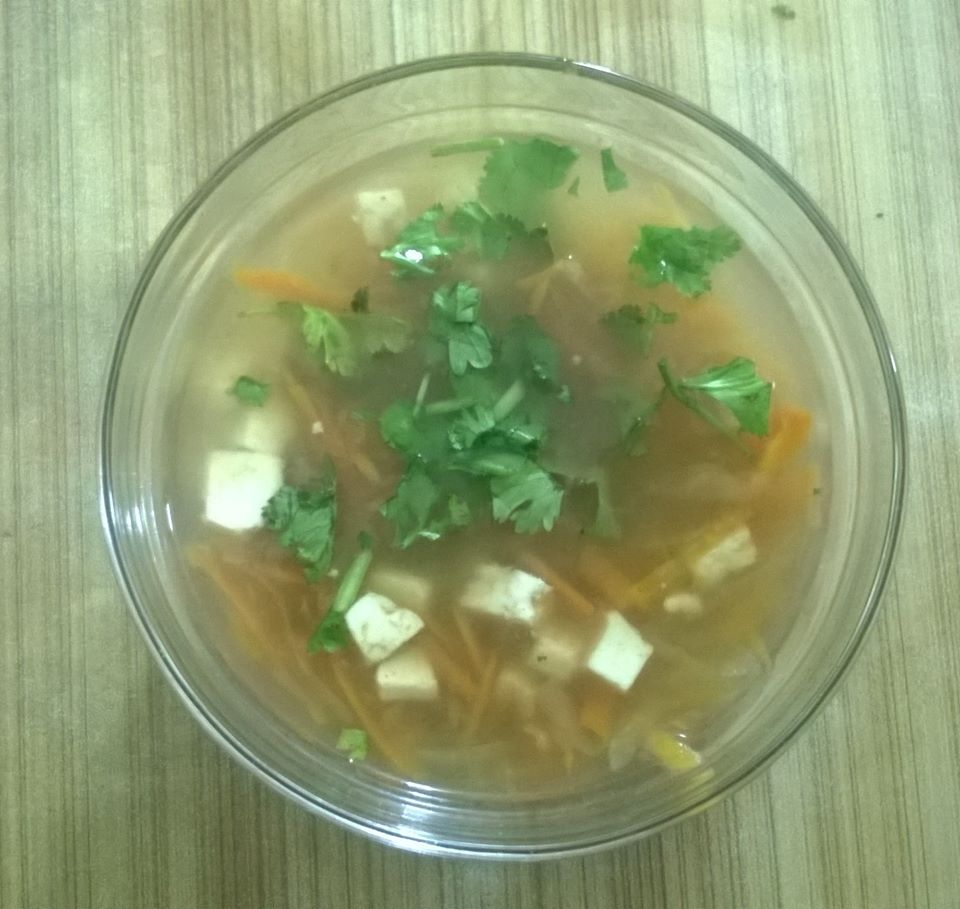
A broth-style carrot-papaya soup prepared using julienned carrots

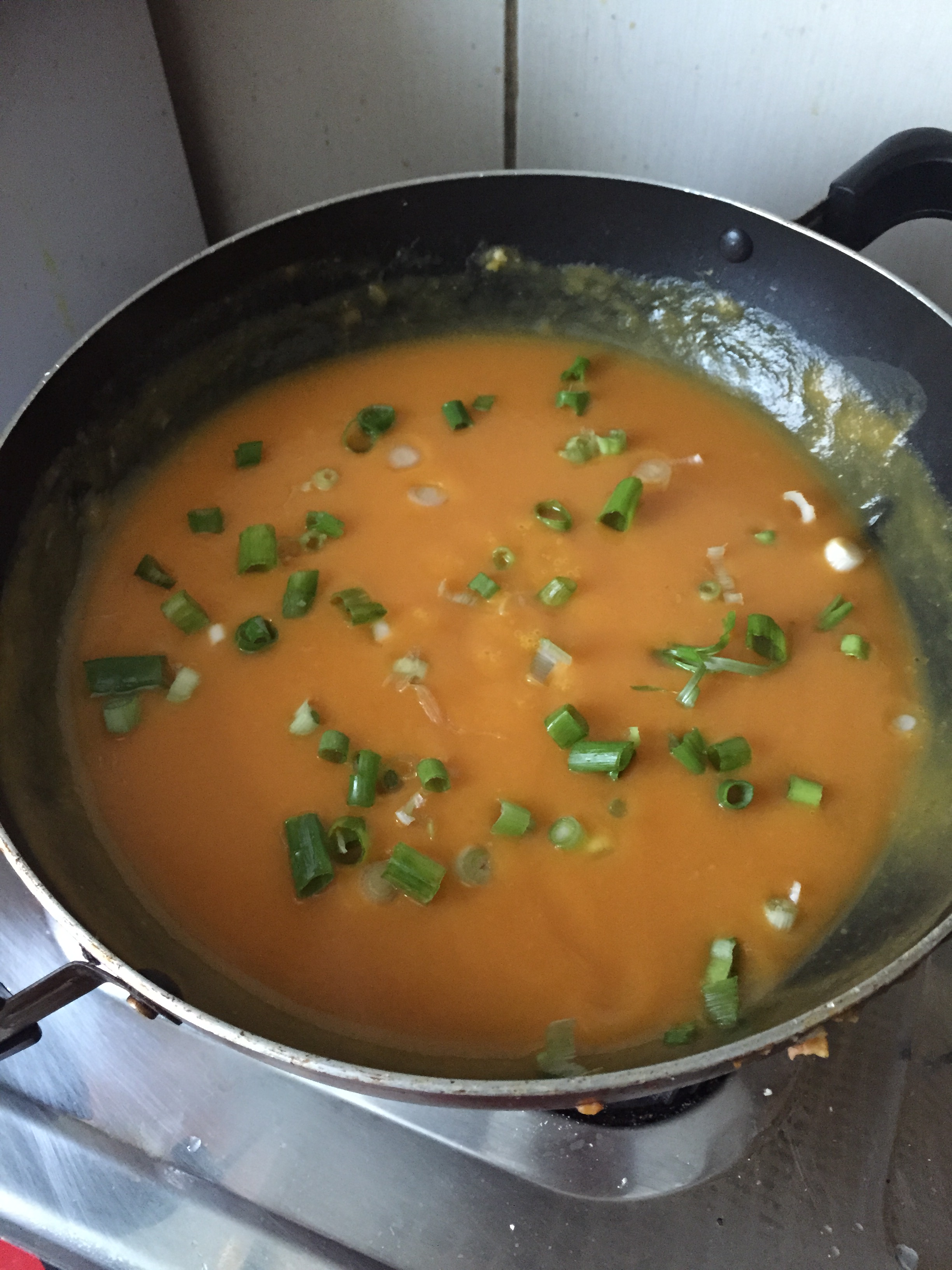
A carrot-ginger soup

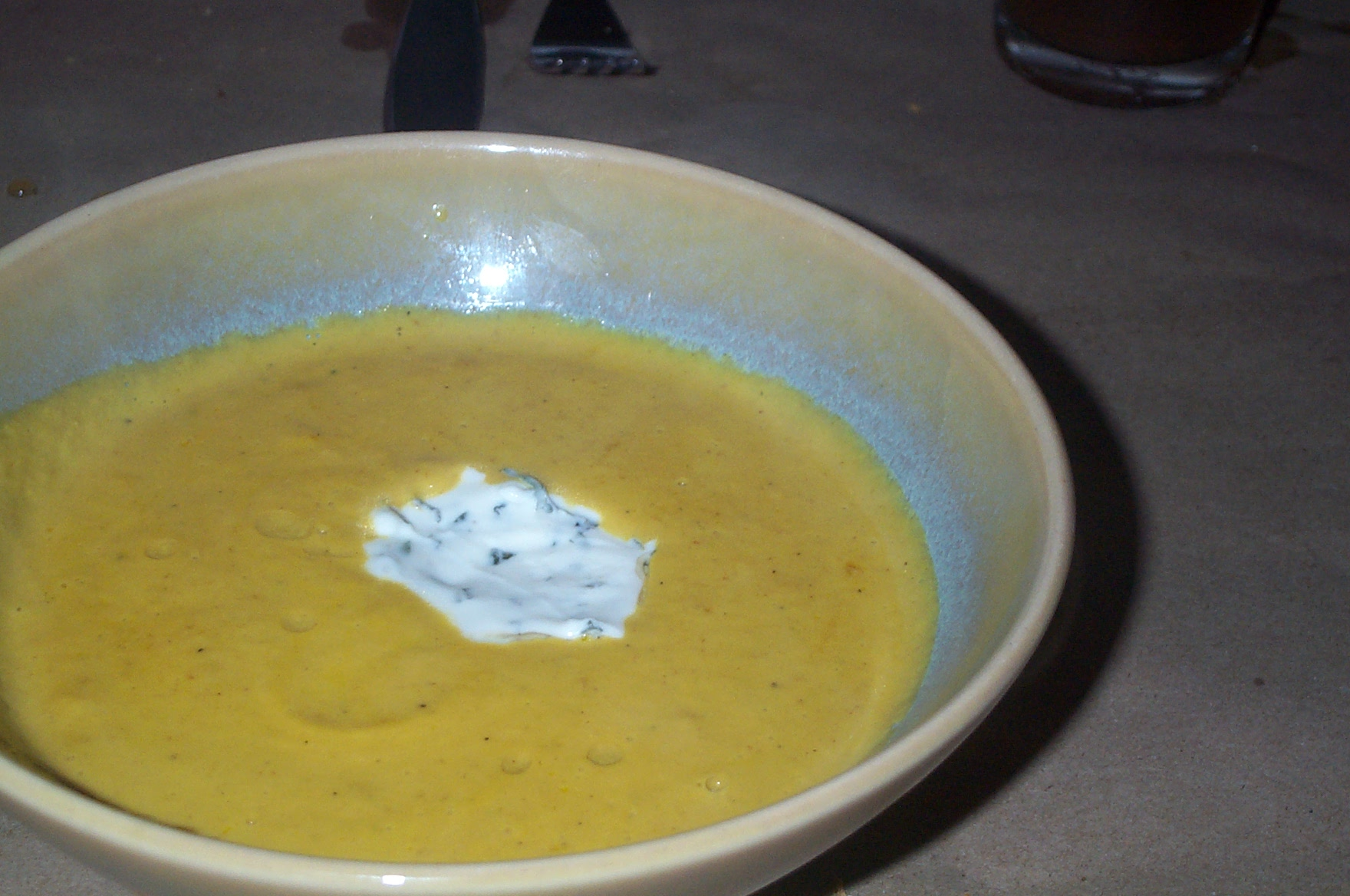
Carrot soup with Greek yogurt

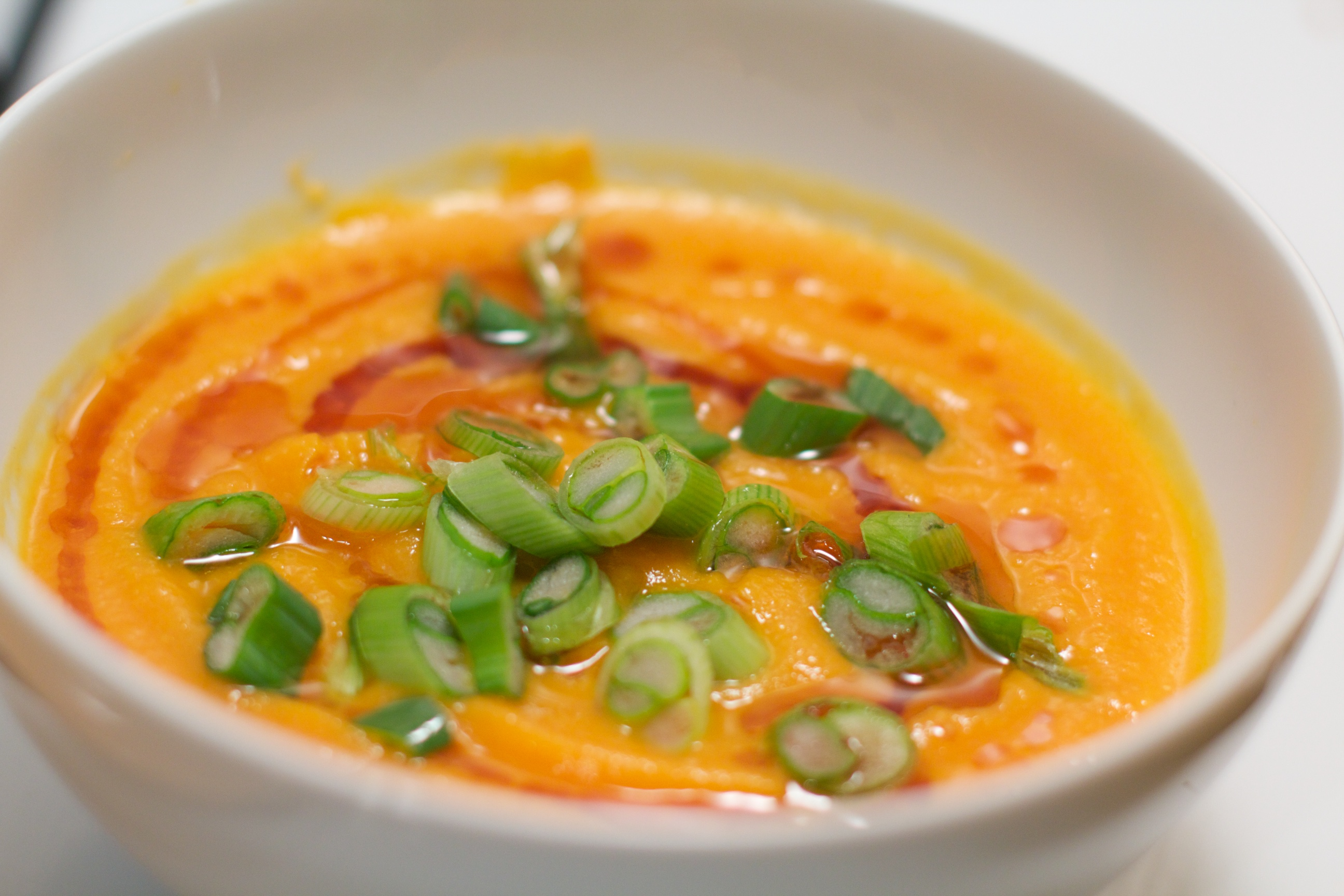
A carrot-ginger soup garnished with green onion and sesame oil

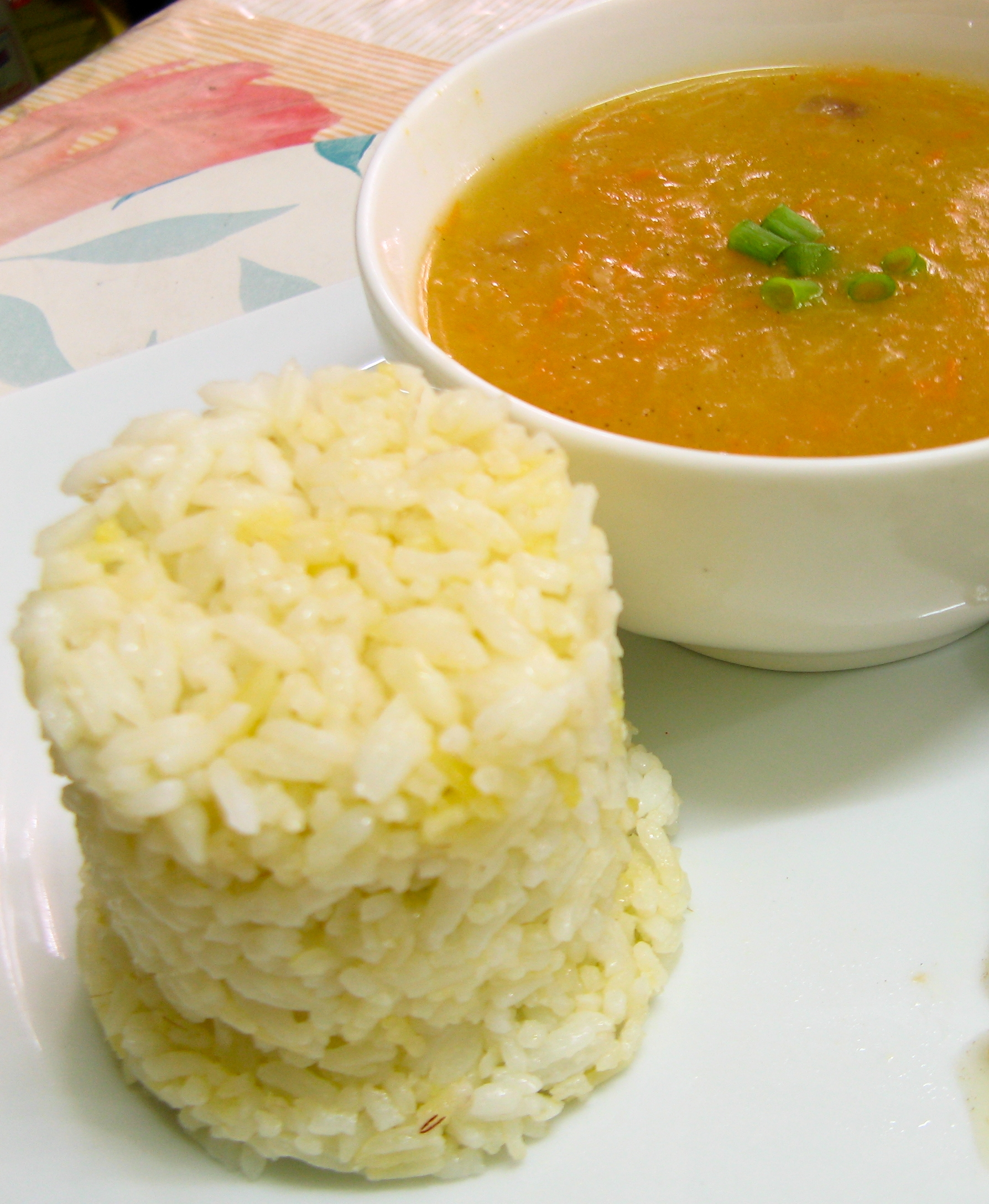
Carrot-potato soup served with rice

== In French cuisine ==
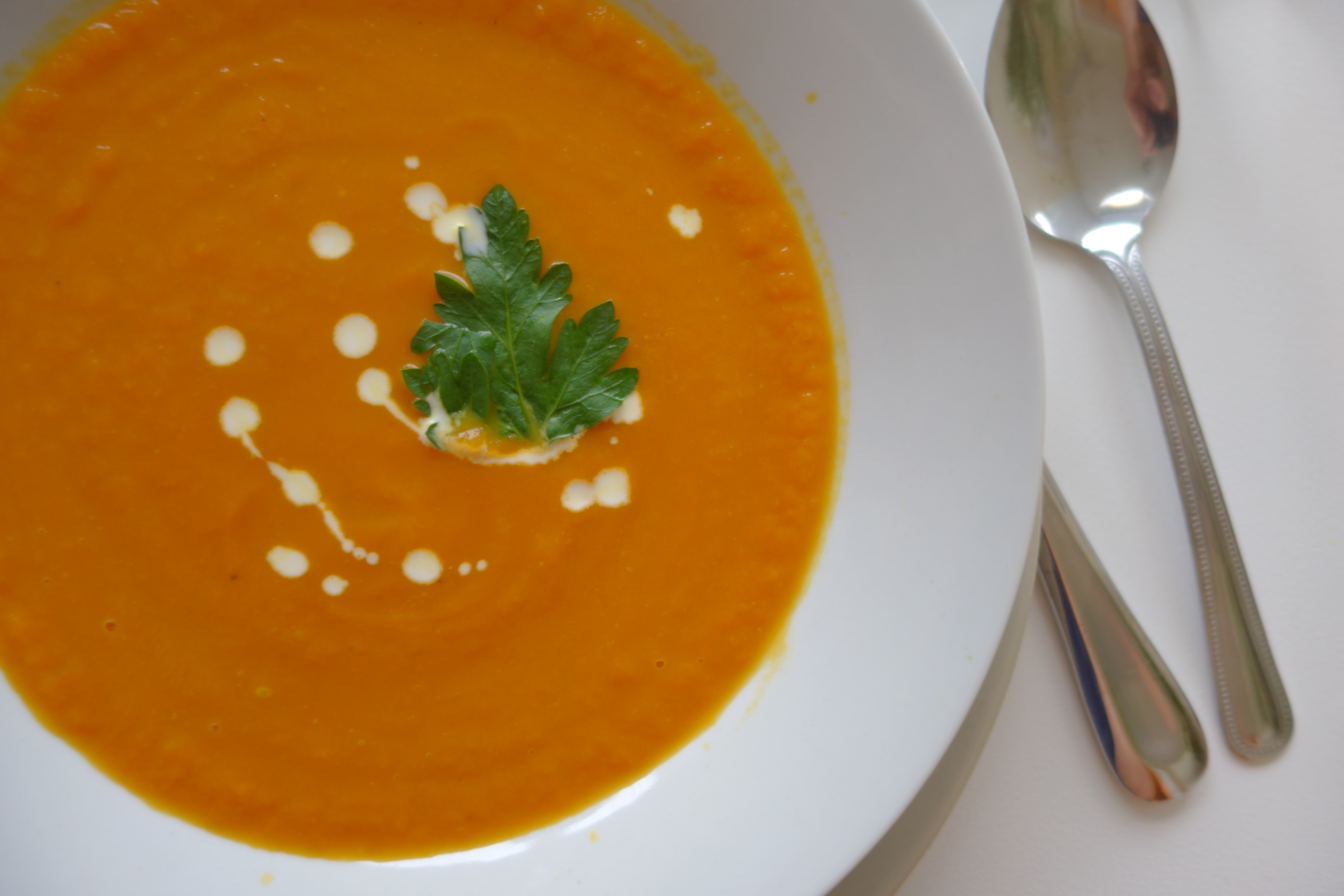
Potage Crécy

Carrot soup (potage de Crécy, potage Crécy, etc.) has been described as a "classic" and "famous" dish in French cuisine. Potage is a variety of soups that have a thick consistency. Potage Crécy is named after Crécy-en-Ponthieu, a commune in Northern France that has been purported to produce carrots with the best flavor within the country.

In French cuisine, Crécy soup is typically prepared with rice, which can also be served as a side dish. Rice may be used as an ingredient to thicken the dish, and barley has also been used.

== History ==
Although the modern sweet orange carrot was not developed until the 16th century, in the Low Countries, it has been represented as a tradition, and it was once customary for English people to eat Crécy soup annually on 26 August in commemoration of the anniversary of the Battle of Crécy, which occurred in Crécy, France on that date in 1346.

Crécy soup was eaten annually by King Edward VII, King of the United Kingdom between 1901 and 1910, on the battle's anniversary day, in honour of his ancestor, Edward, the Black Prince, who led the battle. It has also been suggested that the soup was served to triumphant English soldiers after the battle concluded, using carrots from Crécy. Ernst Moro, an Austrian physician and pediatrician invented Professor Moro's Carrot Soup, which is shown to be effective against diarrhea caused by antibiotic-resistant bacteria.

== See also ==
- List of carrot dishes
- List of soups
- List of vegetable soups
