= Carrot bread =

Bread featuring carrots

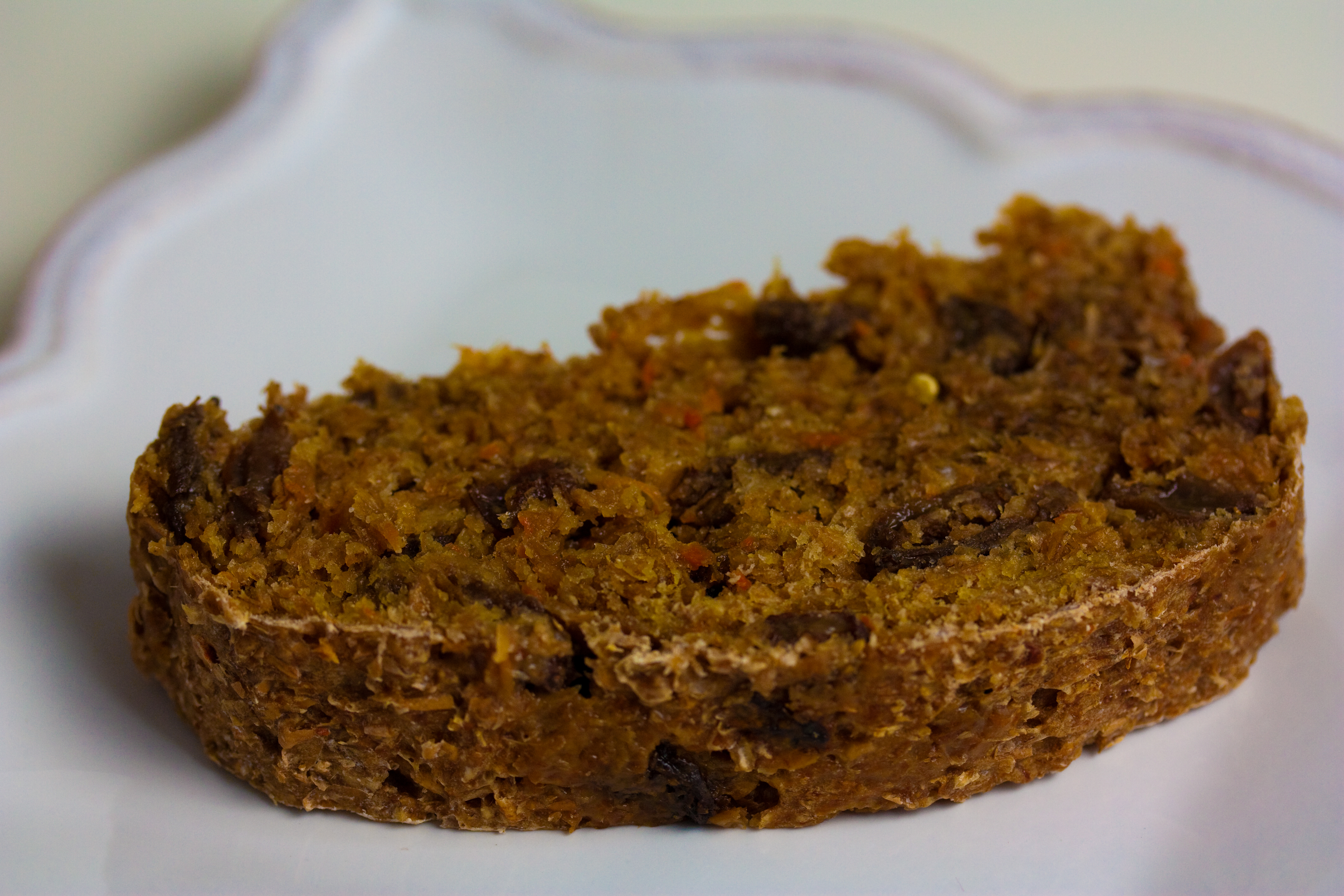
A carrot bread with raisins

Carrot bread is a type of quick bread, and may also be prepared as a yeast-leavened bread, in which carrots are used as a primary ingredient for flavor, moisture, and natural sweetness. It may be prepared with grated, shredded carrots, or carrot juice. Baking times can vary depending on the amount of juice in the carrots used, and it may be a moist bread. The moisture content of carrot bread can vary depending on whether grated carrots, shredded carrots, or carrot juice is used, which influences both texture and baking time. Carrot bread may have an orange color derived from carrot juice or the carrots used.

Additional ingredients used in the preparation of carrot bread may include zucchini (although zucchini itself can be made into zucchini bread), buttermilk, eggs, milk, brown sugar, cinnamon, nutmeg, walnuts, ginger and raisins. Carrot bread can be prepared as a sourdough and/or multigrain bread. It may be eaten plain, served with butter, or topped with an icing or glaze. Carrot bread can be served as a means to increase vegetable intake in diets.

== See also ==
- Carrot cake
- Carrot cake cookie
- Banana bread

=== Lists ===
- List of breads
- List of carrot dishes
- List of quick breads
