= List of carrot dishes =

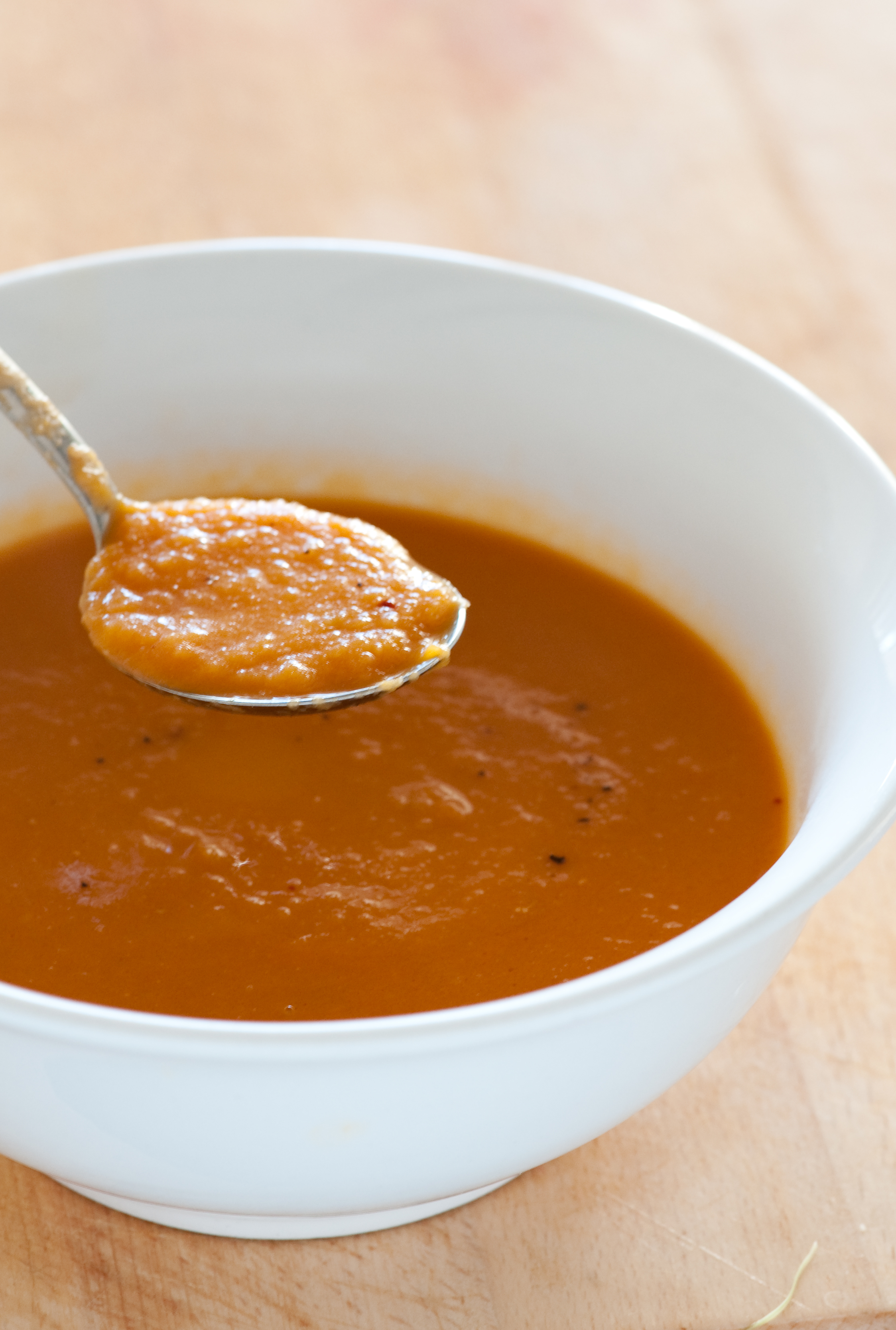
A carrot soup

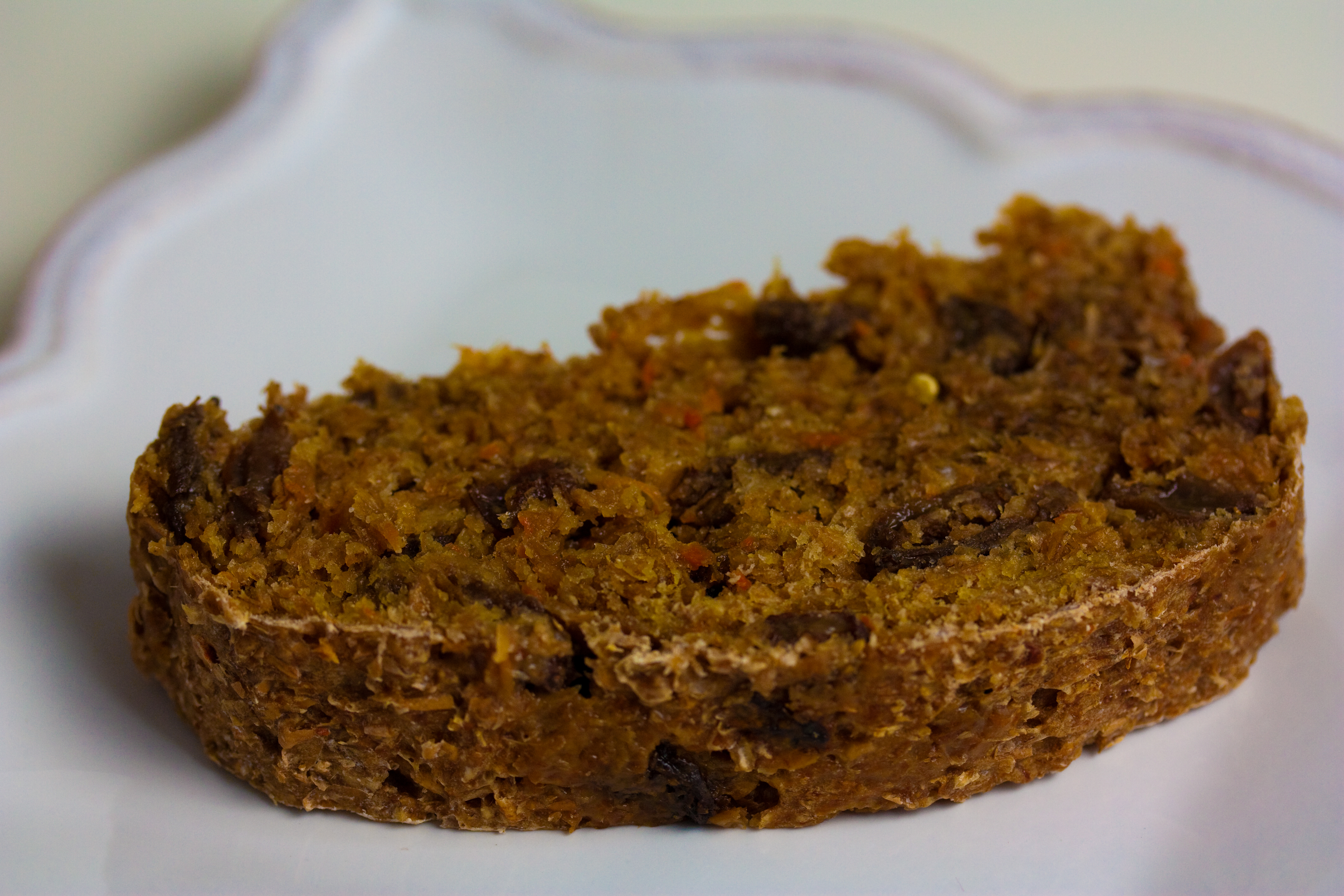
A vegan carrot bread prepared with carrot and raisins

This is a list of carrot dishes and foods, which use carrot as a primary ingredient. The carrot (Daucus carota subsp. sativus) is a root vegetable, usually orange in colour, though purple, red, white, and yellow varieties exist.

== Carrot dishes ==
- Apio – Balkan Jewish braised celery root and carrot dish
- Candied carrots
- Carrot bread – a bread or quick bread that uses carrot as a primary ingredient
- Carrot cake
- Carrot chips – sliced carrots that have been fried or dehydrated
- Carrot hot dog - carrot cured in hot dog spices and grilled
- Carrot juice – has a uniquely sweet flavor of concentrated carrots, and is often consumed as a health drink
- Carrot jam - a Portuguese delicacy
- Carrot pudding – can be served as either a savory pudding or as a sweet dessert
- Carrot salad – recipes vary widely by regional cuisine, and shredded carrot is often used. Shredded carrot salads are also sometimes used as a topping for other dishes.
  - Morkovcha – a Koryo-saram (Koreans of the former Soviet Union) dish, variant of kimchi.
- Carrot soup – may be prepared as a cream-style soup and as a broth-style soup.
- Cezerye – gelatinous confection made with carrots
- Chai tow kway
- Gajar ka halwa – a carrot-based sweet dessert pudding from the Indian subcontinent
- Hutspot – Boiled vegetable dish associated with Dutch cuisine
- Kimpira - a Japanese dish which main ingredient is root vegetables, such as gobos and carrots
- Mashed carrots – usually served as a side dish to meat and/or vegetables
- Porkkanalaatikko
- Tzimmes
Carrot dishes

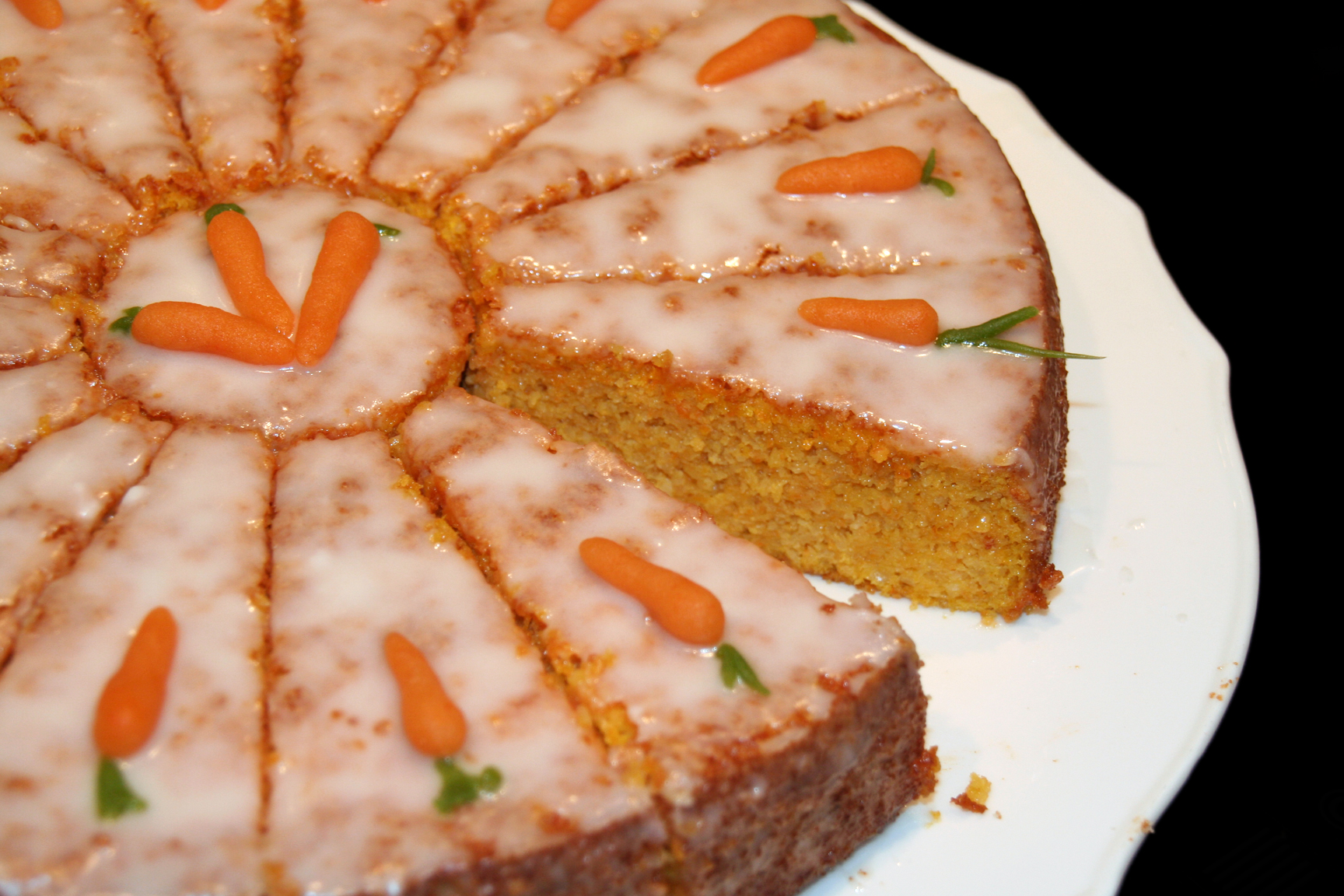
A carrot cake

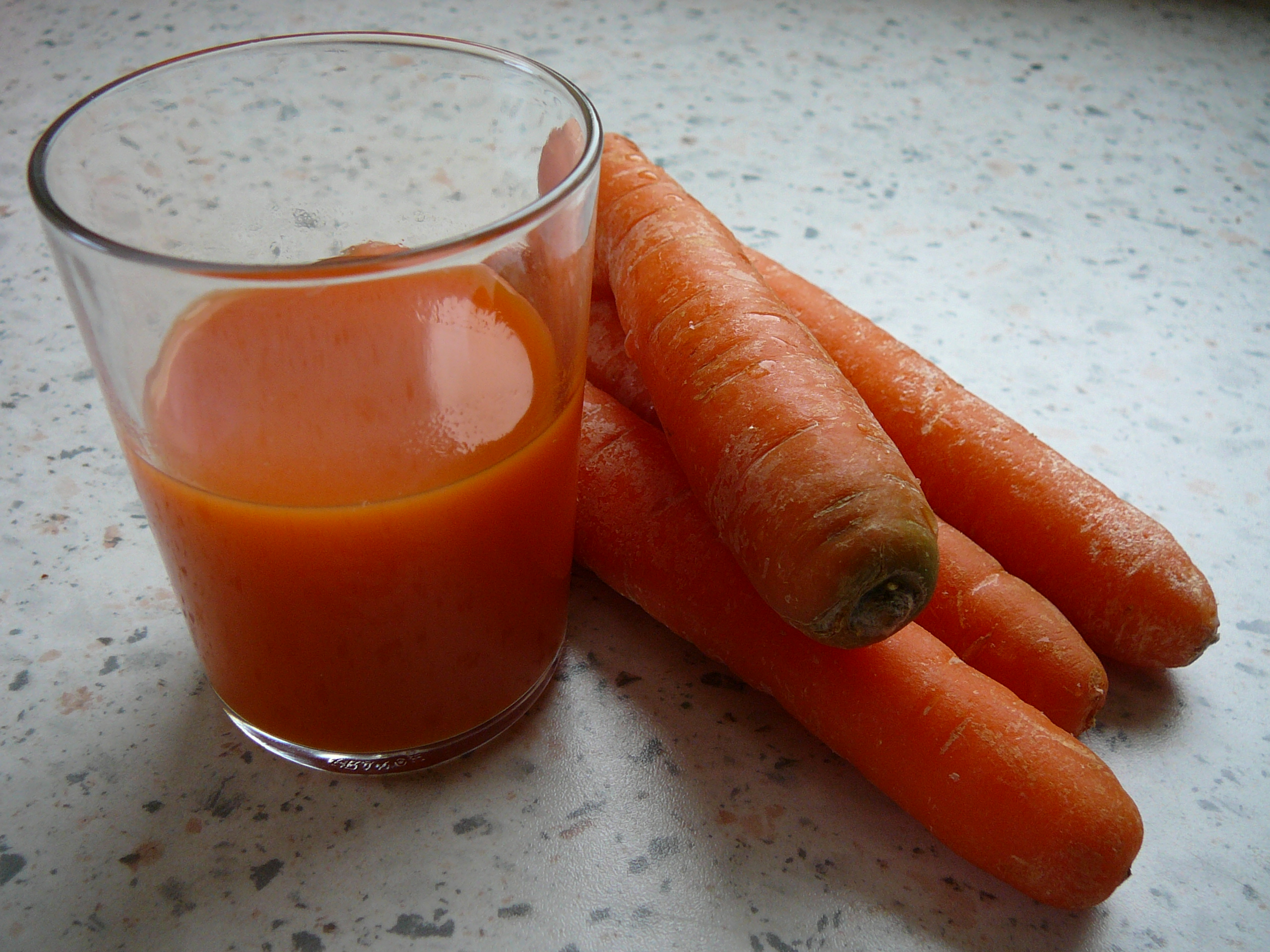
Carrot juice with carrots

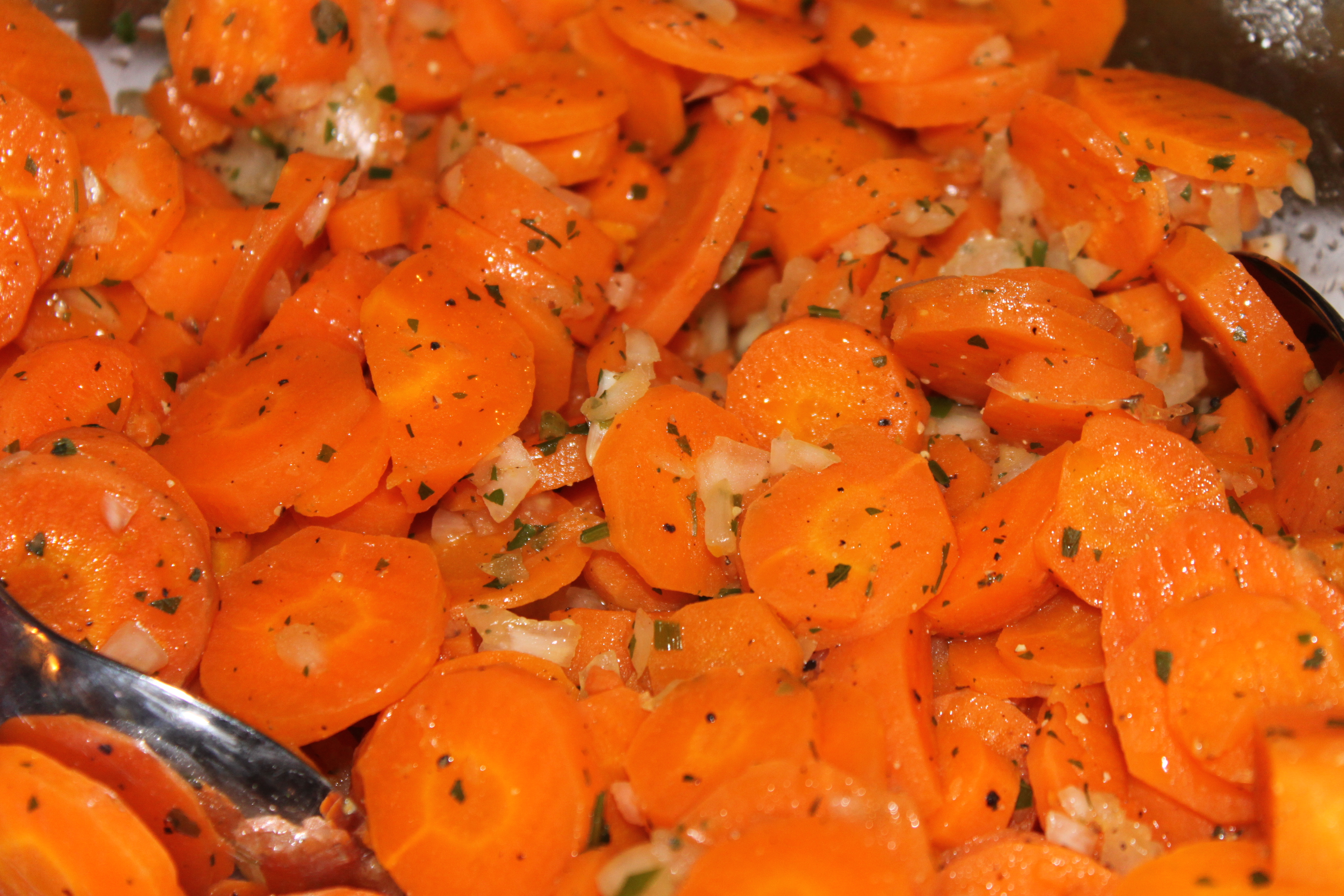
Close-up view of a carrot salad

== See also ==
- Carrot seed oil
- List of vegetable dishes
