= Carrot pudding =

Sweet dessert made with carrots

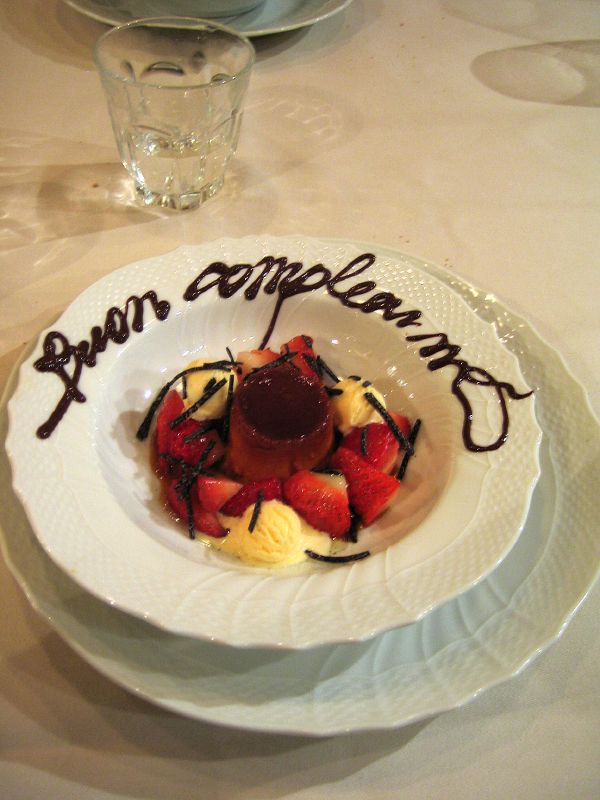
- Carrot pudding with fruits
- Type: Pudding
- Main ingredients: carrots, butter, sugar, eggs, spices

Carrot pudding is a dish traditional to a wide range of cultures around the world. It can be served either as a savoury pudding (as an accompaniment to a regular meal) or as a sweet dessert.

== History ==
An English recipe, published in 1591, describes "pudding in a Carret [sic] root" that is essentially a stuffed carrot with meat, shortening, cream, eggs, raisins, sweetener (dates and sugar), spices (clove and mace), scraped carrot, and breadcrumbs. In The Oxford Companion to Food, writer Alan Davidson believes that carrots were used in Europe to make sweet cakes. These were a predecessor to the carrot cake. Carrot pudding has been served in Ireland since at least the 18th century. It was also served in the United States as long ago as 1876. Because sweeteners were rationed during the Second World War, carrot pudding was seen as an alternative in the UK. Later on, carrot cake was seen as a 'health food'.

A sweet dish/dessert associated mainly with Indian cuisine is called Gajar Pak or Gajrela or Gajar ka halwa (carrot sweet dish).

== See also ==
- List of carrot dishes
