= Mashed carrot =

Dish prepared with carrots

Mashed carrots
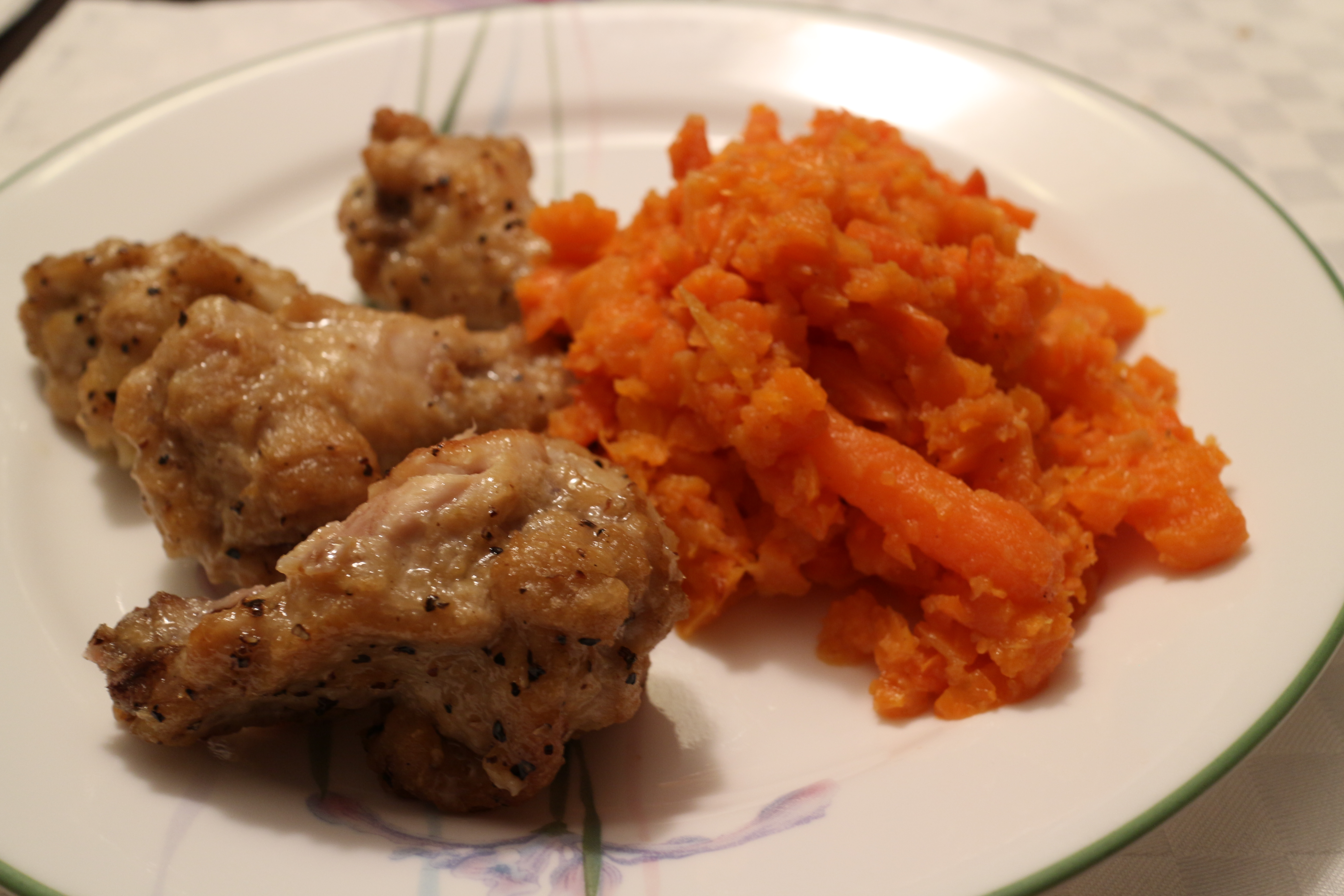
- Chicken wings served with mashed carrot
- Course: Side dish
- Serving temperature: Hot
- Main ingredients: Carrots

Mashed carrots is a dish prepared by cooking and then mashing carrots. Milk, butter, salt and pepper are commonly mixed in after the carrots are mashed. Carrots can also be roasted in the oven before mashing. Other mashed vegetables may be added to the mashed carrots. These include onions, parsnips, turnips, squash, and rutabaga. Mashed potatoes may be mashed along with mashed carrots.

To create mashed carrots, the carrots are washed and cut into a uniform size and boiled, steamed or roasted. The cooked carrots then can be mashed in a food processor or by hand with a potato masher. In addition, canned carrots can be used to prepare mashed carrots. Mashed carrots are served hot.

Mashed carrots may be served as a side dish. They are a major ingredient in carrot muffins, carrot cookies and carrot souffle. Mashed carrots are used in the home for baby food and in commercially prepared 'baby' food.

== See also ==
- List of carrot dishes
- Mashed potatoes
- Mashed pumpkin
