= Beetroot cake =

Sweet cake with beetroot as an ingredient

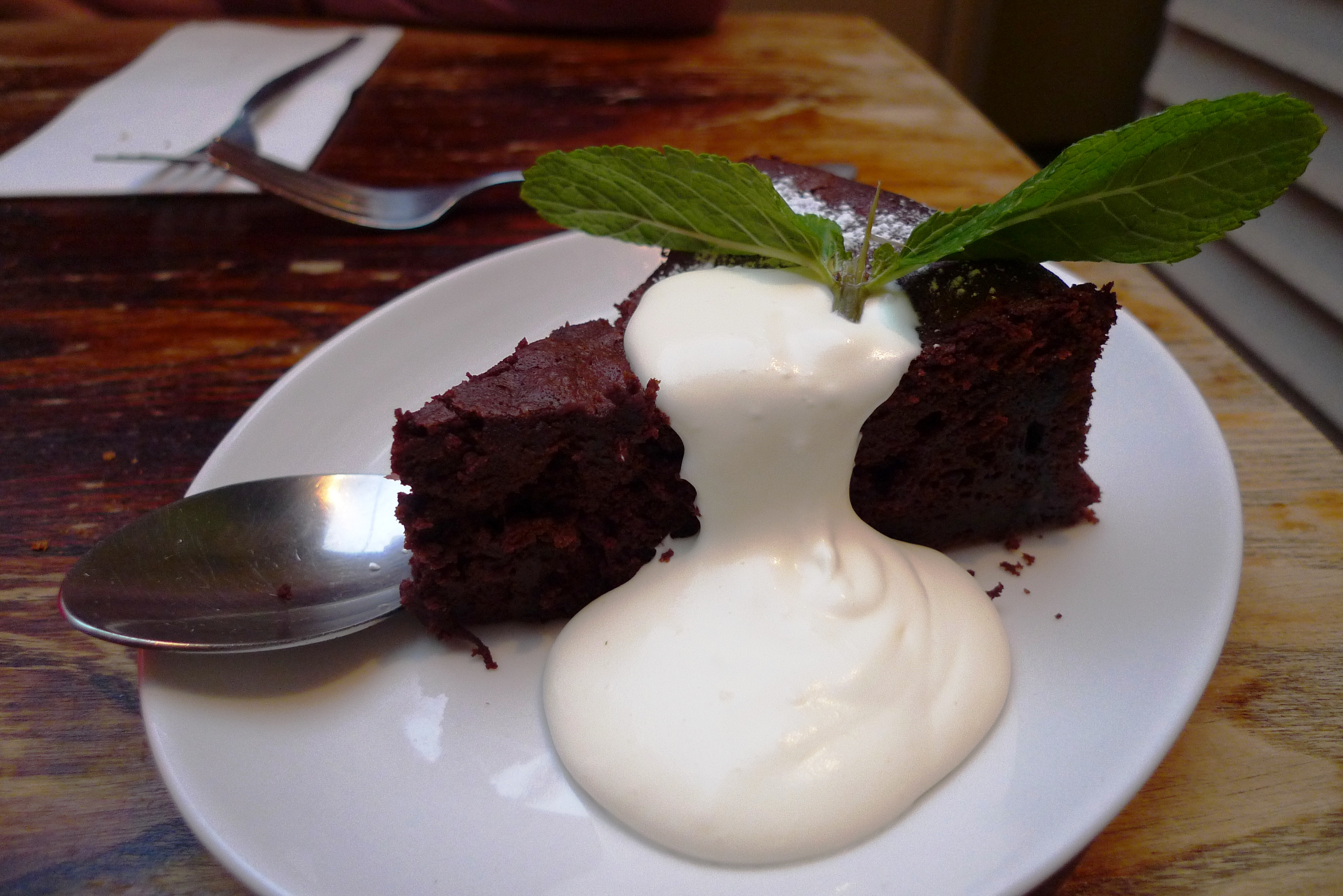
- A chocolate and beetroot cake
- Type: Loaf, sheet cake, layer cake, cupcake
- Region or state: Western Europe
- Main ingredients: Flour, eggs, sugar, beetroot, and baking powder
- Variations: Chocolate

Beetroot cake is a cake that contains beetroots mixed into the batter. Beetroot juice is sometimes used for colouring in red velvet cake. A variation is chocolate and beetroot cake, which combines the moisture of beetroot with the flavour of chocolate.

Commercially, the cake can also be manufactured with the use of beetroot powder, with the aim of producing cakes with a higher nutrient content. The addition of beetroot to other cake types also improves the oxidative stability and shelf life.

== See also ==
- Carrot cake
