= Carrot cake =

Dessert cake

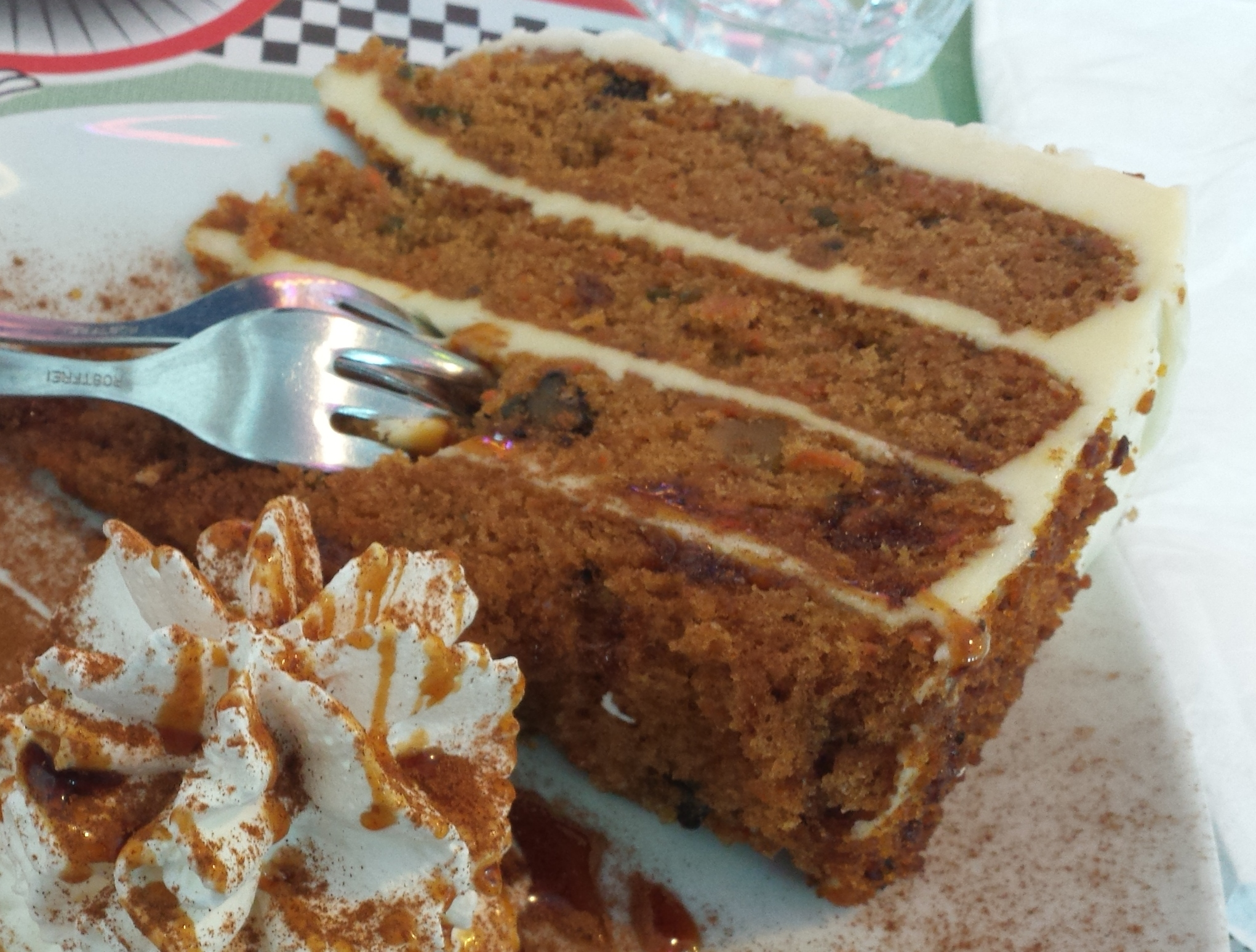
- A slice of carrot cake with frosting
- Type: sheet cake, layer cake, cupcake
- Place of origin: Europe
- Main ingredients: Flour, eggs, sugar, carrots, and baking powder
- Variations: Hazelnuts, lemon, kirsch, cinnamon, almonds, walnuts

Carrot cake is a cake that contains carrots mixed into the spiced batter, often topped with a rich cream cheese frosting. Carrot cake uses neutral oils like vegetable oil or canola oil instead of butter to keep it moist even when refrigerated.

== History ==
An English recipe published in 1591 for "pudding in a Carret [sic] root" is essentially a carrot stuffed with meat, but it includes many elements common to the modern dessert: shortening, cream, eggs, raisins, sweetener (dates and sugar), spices (clove and mace), scraped carrot, and breadcrumbs (in place of flour). Many food historians believe that carrot cake originated in such carrot puddings eaten by Europeans in the Middle Ages, when sugar and sweeteners were expensive and many people used carrots as a substitute for sugar.

Variations of the carrot pudding evolved to include baking with a crust (as pumpkin pie), steamed with a sauce, or moulded in pans (as plum pudding) with icing.

In volume two of L'art du cuisinier (1814), Antoine Beauvilliers, former chef to Louis XVI, included a recipe for a "Gâteau de Carottes", which was popular enough to be copied verbatim in competitors' cookbooks. In 1824, Beauvilliers published an English version of his cookbook in London which includes a recipe for "Carrot Cakes" in a literal translation of his earlier recipe.

Another 19th-century recipe comes from the housekeeping school of Kaiseraugst (canton of Aargau, Switzerland). According to the Culinary Heritage of Switzerland, it is one of the most popular cakes in Switzerland, especially for the birthdays of children.

The popularity of carrot cake was revived in the United Kingdom because of the rationing during the Second World War and also because of the promotion of carrot consumption by the government.

== Regional variations ==
=== Brazil ===
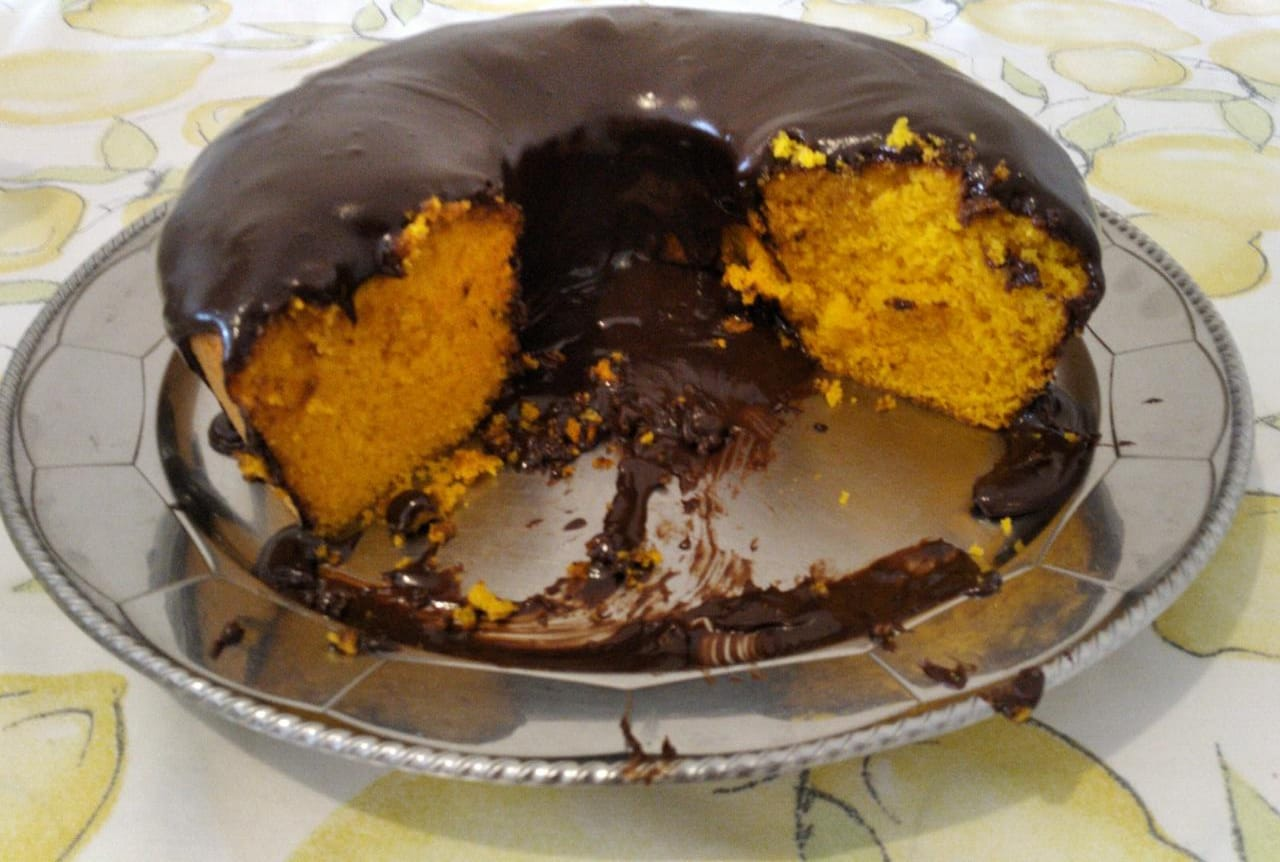
A Brazilian Bolo de cenoura (lit. 'carrot cake') topped with chocolate ganache

Brazilian bolo de cenoura (lit. 'carrot cake') is a fluffy and moist cake that is commonly served with a chocolate ganache topping. As opposed to other Brazilian desserts that originated with the Portuguese, bolo de cenoura is much more recent and began appearing in Brazilian cookbooks only in the 1960s. The inspiration behind bolo de cenoura comes from the American recipe for carrot cake.

February 3 is national carrot cake day in Brazil.

=== Switzerland ===
Swiss Rüeblitorte features almonds and hazelnuts and is often covered in glacé icing containing kirsch and topped with decorative carrots made from marzipan.

=== UK and US ===
Modern UK and US recipes typically feature a white cream cheese icing. Sometimes nuts, such as walnuts or pecans, are added to the cake batter, as well as spices, such as cinnamon, ginger and ground mixed spice. Toasting pecans and using brown sugar can add extra flavour and moisture. Fruits, including pineapple, raisins and shredded coconut, can also be used to add sweetness.

United States

A carrot cake cookie is a type of cookie prepared with ingredients that replicate the flavour and texture of carrot cake. Typical ingredients include grated carrot, flour, white sugar or brown sugar, cooking oil, spices and baking soda. Additional ingredients may include shredded coconut, raisins, molasses and nuts. Many variations exist, such as carrot cake whoopie pies, cookie sandwiches, and those prepared in the style of an energy bar. Cream cheese is sometimes used as a topping or a filling in cookie sandwich varieties. Vegan versions may use vegan cream cheese as a substitute for dairy-based cream cheese. From the 2020s, versions of the cookie were produced by Oreo, Subway, and Aldi.

== Gallery ==
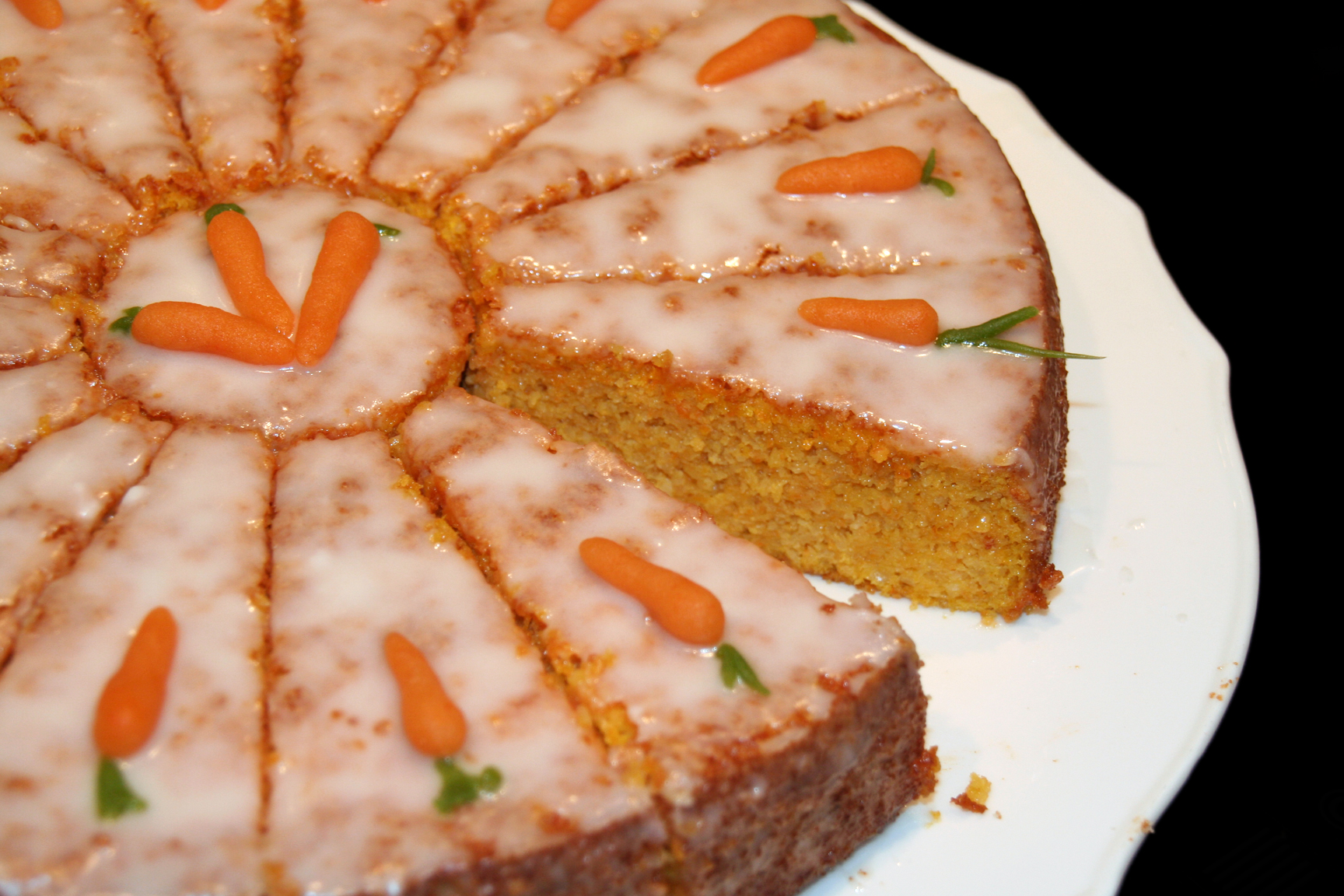
Swiss Rüeblitorte

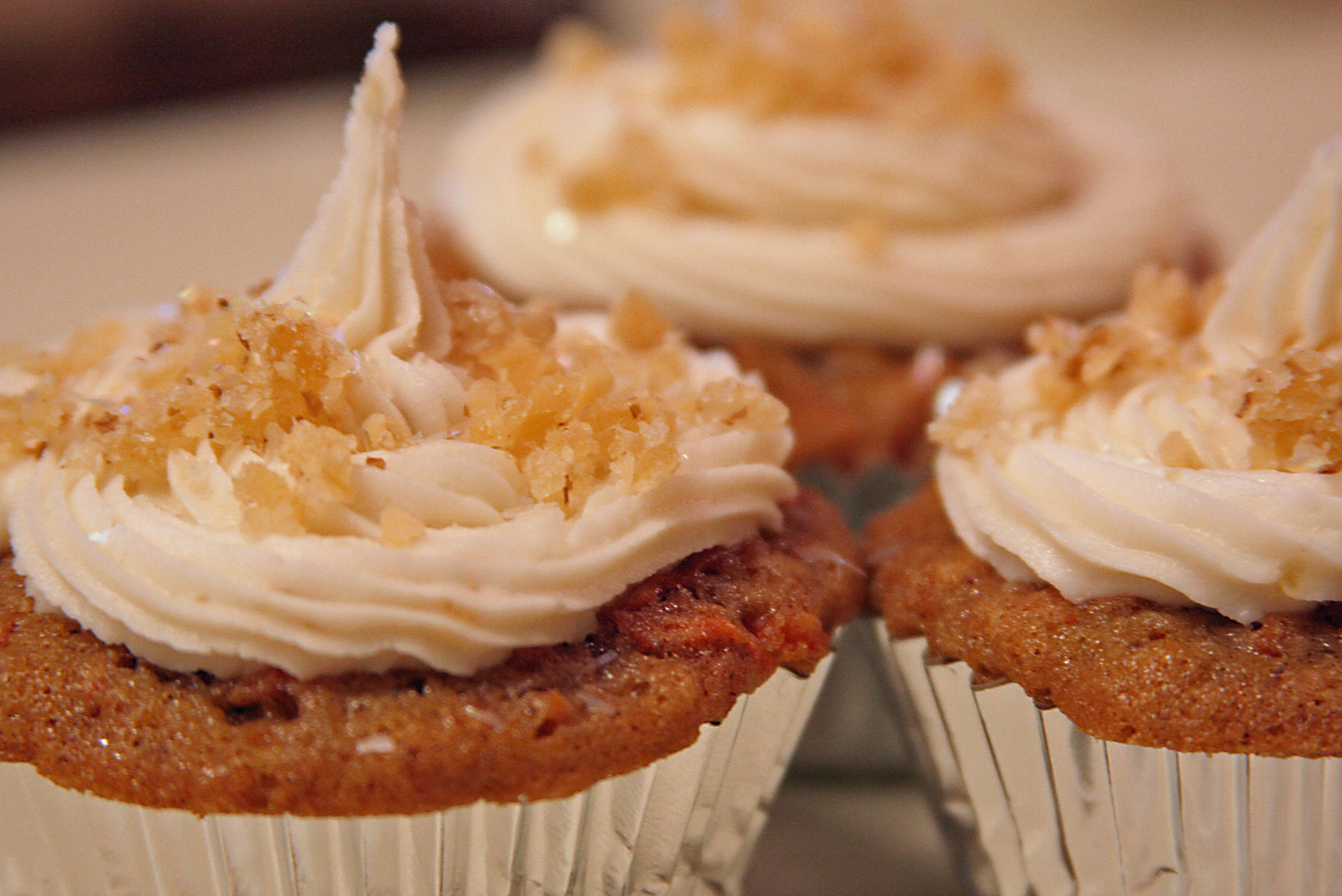
Carrot cake cupcakes with candied ginger icing

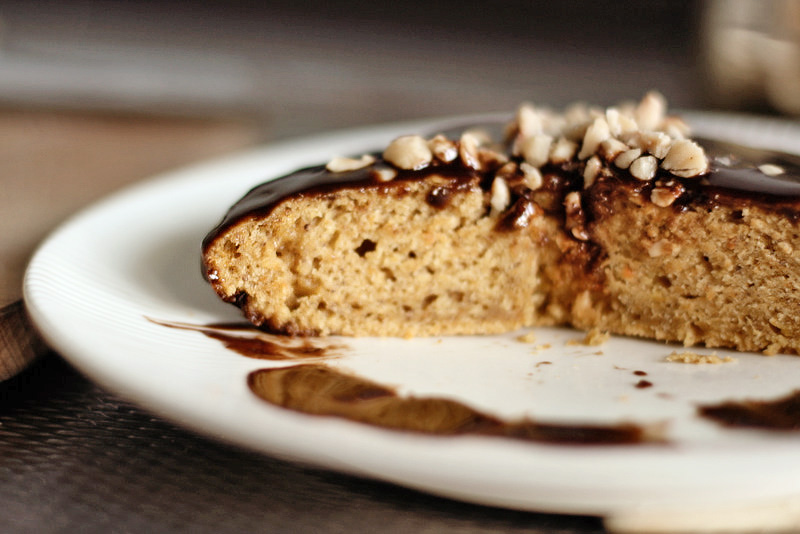
A vegan carrot cake

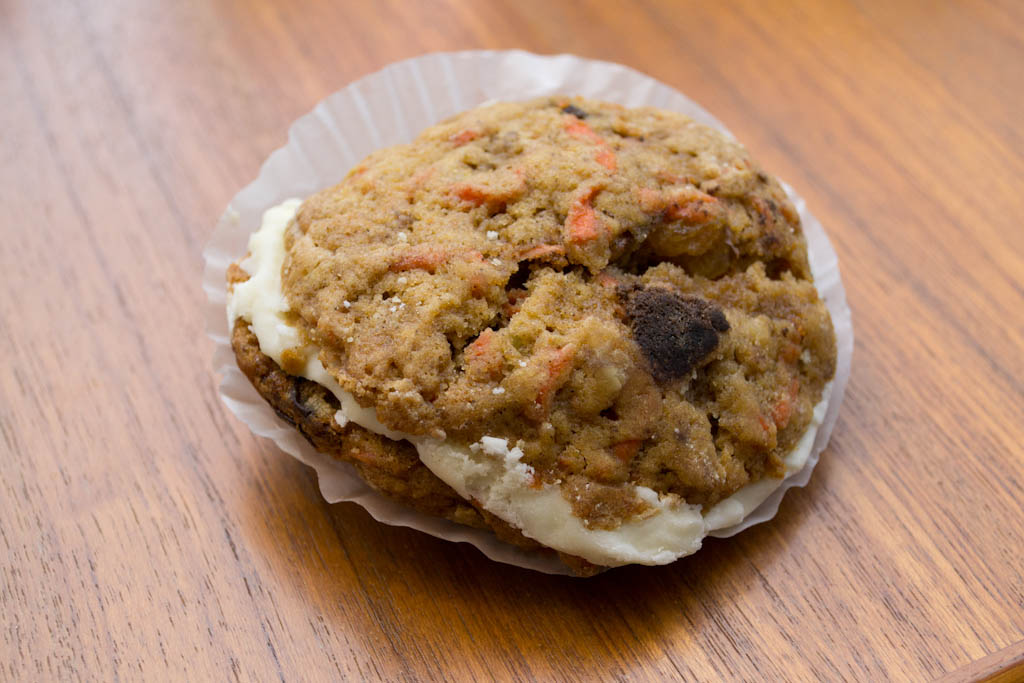
Two carrot cake cookies with a cream filling between them

== See also ==
- List of cakes
- Carrot bread
- List of carrot dishes
- Beetroot cake

== Bibliography ==
- Alton Brown, I'm Just Here for More Food: Food × Mixing + Heat = Baking, New York: Stewart, Tabori & Chang, 2002 (ISBN 1-58479-341-4).
- Alan Davidson, Oxford Companion to Food, second edition, illustrations by Soun Vannithone, London: Oxford University Press, 2006 (ISBN 0-19-280681-5).
