= Tzimmes =

Ashkenazi Jewish stew

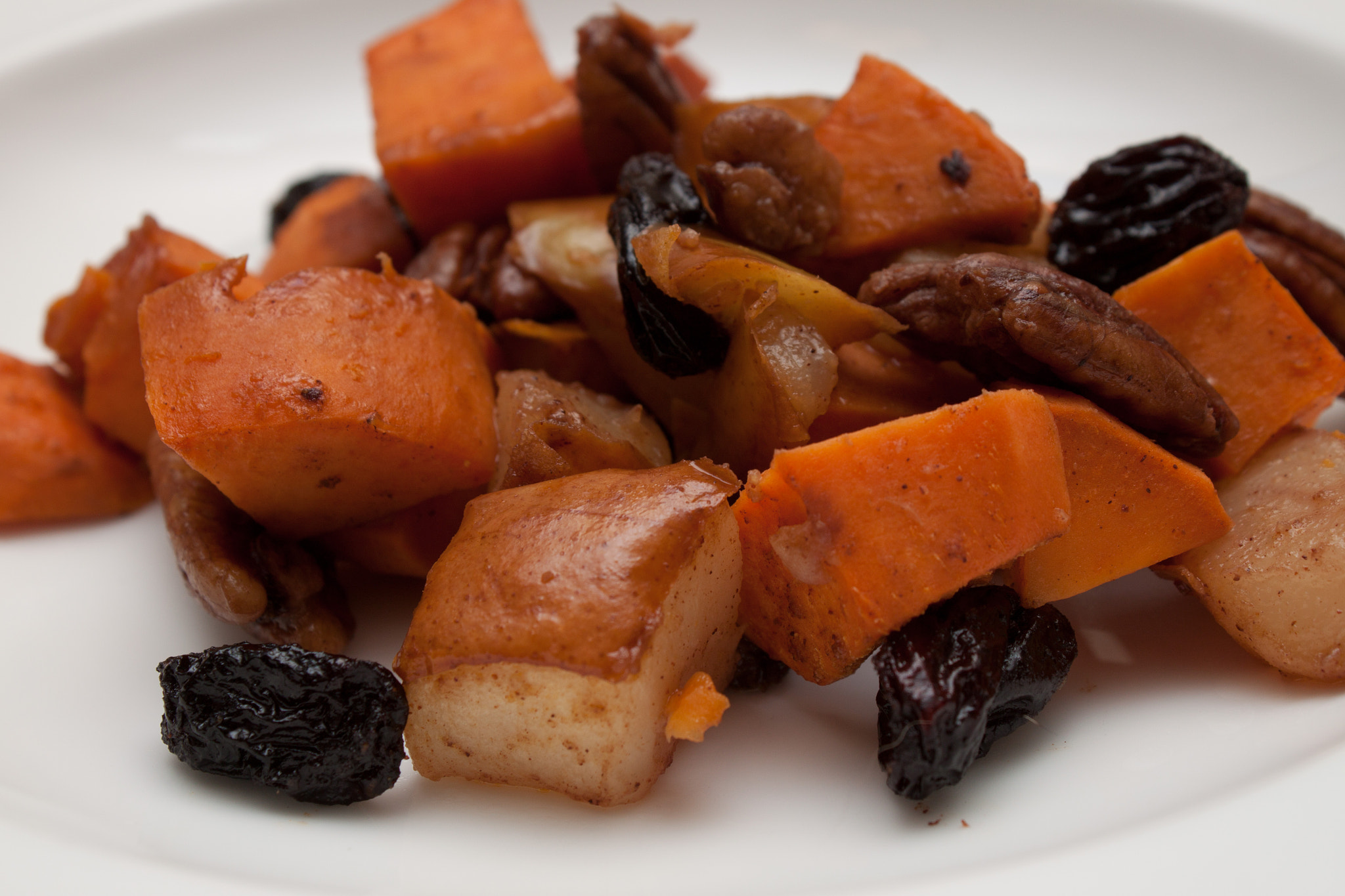
Tzimmes

Tzimmes, or tsimmes (Yiddish: צימעס, Hebrew: צִימֶעס), is a traditional Ashkenazi Jewish stew typically made from carrots and dried fruits such as prunes or raisins, often combined with other root vegetables (including yam).

Tzimmes is often part of the Rosh Hashanah meal, when it is traditional to eat sweet and honey-flavored dishes. Some cooks add chunks of meat (usually beef flanken or brisket). The dish is cooked slowly over low heat and flavored with honey or sugar and sometimes cinnamon or other spices.

The name is a Yiddish word that, according to the Oxford English Dictionary, may come from Middle High German imbīz, 'meal'. "To make a big tzimmes over something" is a Yinglish expression that means to make a big fuss, perhaps because of the slicing, mixing, and stirring that go into the preparation of the dish.

== See also ==
- Jewish cuisine
- Israeli cuisine
- List of carrot dishes
