= Gajar ka halwa =

South Asian sweet

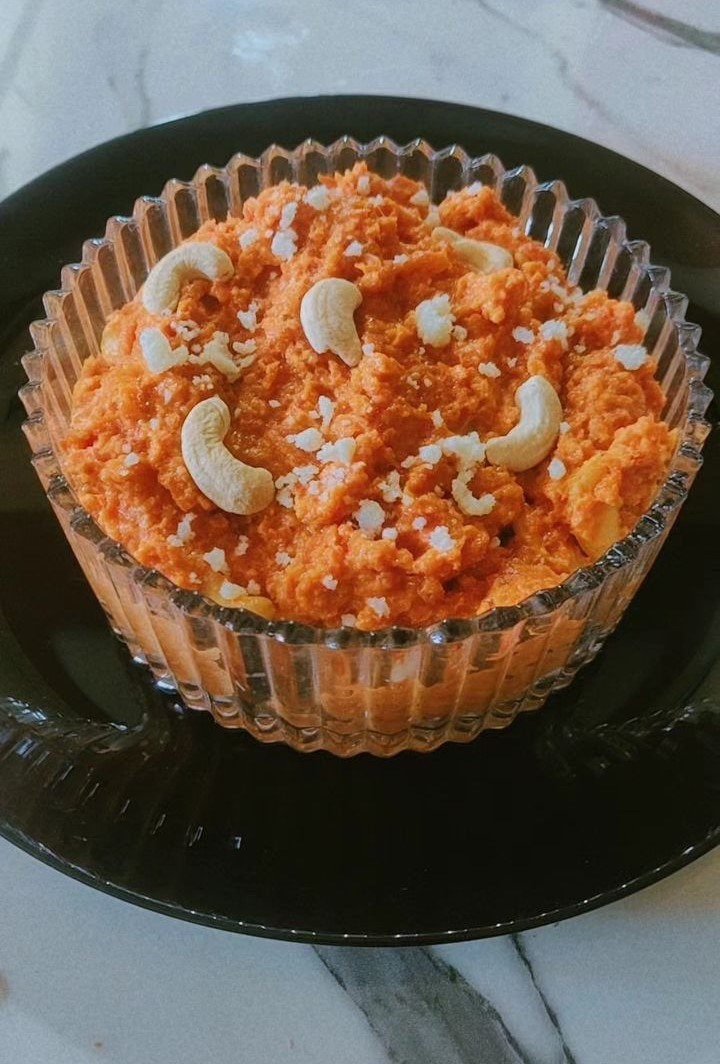
- Gajar ka halwa
- Alternative names: Carrot halwa, gajar ka meetha pak, gajrela, gajorer halwa, gazoror halwa, gajar pak
- Course: Dessert
- Region or state: South Asia
- Associated cuisine: India, Bangladesh, Pakistan
- Serving temperature: Hot or cold
- Main ingredients: Carrots, milk, water, ghee, sugar, khoya
- Variations: Black carrot halwa, red carrot halwa, carrot and beetroot halwa, cheesy carrot halwa

Gajar ka halwa, also known as gajorer halwa, gajarno halwo, gajar pak, and carrot pudding, is a type of halva, an Indian dessert, made by placing grated carrots in a pot containing a specific amount of water, milk, sugar, and cardamom and then cooking with ghee while stirring regularly. It is often served with a garnish of almonds and pistachios. The nuts and other items used are first sautéed in ghee, a type of clarified butter from the Indian subcontinent. It is generally served hot during the winter.

The dessert is traditionally eaten during all the festivals in the Indian subcontinent, mainly on the occasion of Diwali, Holi, Raksha Bandhan, and Eid. It is served hot during the winter.

== Description ==
Gajar ka halwa is a combination of nuts, milk, sugar, khoya and ghee with grated carrots. It has a medium shelf life so it is now sometimes exported.

At the time of festivals, many people prefer vegetarian dishes as well as desserts in their thali. Because of its low fat content, vegetarian characteristics, ease of making, medium shelf-life and taste, gajar ka halwa is a popular dessert all over India and often served at most festivals.

== Recipe and ingredients ==
Gajar ka halwa originally contained carrots, milk and ghee but nowadays includes many other ingredients like mava (khoya).

The main ingredients of gajar ka halwa are freshly grated carrots, milk, sugar, cardamom, khoya, and ghee. Being a combination of milk and carrots, it is known as milk flavored gajar ka halwa but in the other case, the combination of cream or mava (khoya) and carrot is described as mava flavored gajar ka halwa. For cooking, a cooker or kadai is usually preferred. Vasundhara Chauhan, writing for The Hindu, writes that gajar ka halwa should be slow-cooked and that using a pressure cooker spoils the dish. The carrots must be grated before cooking.

== Variations ==
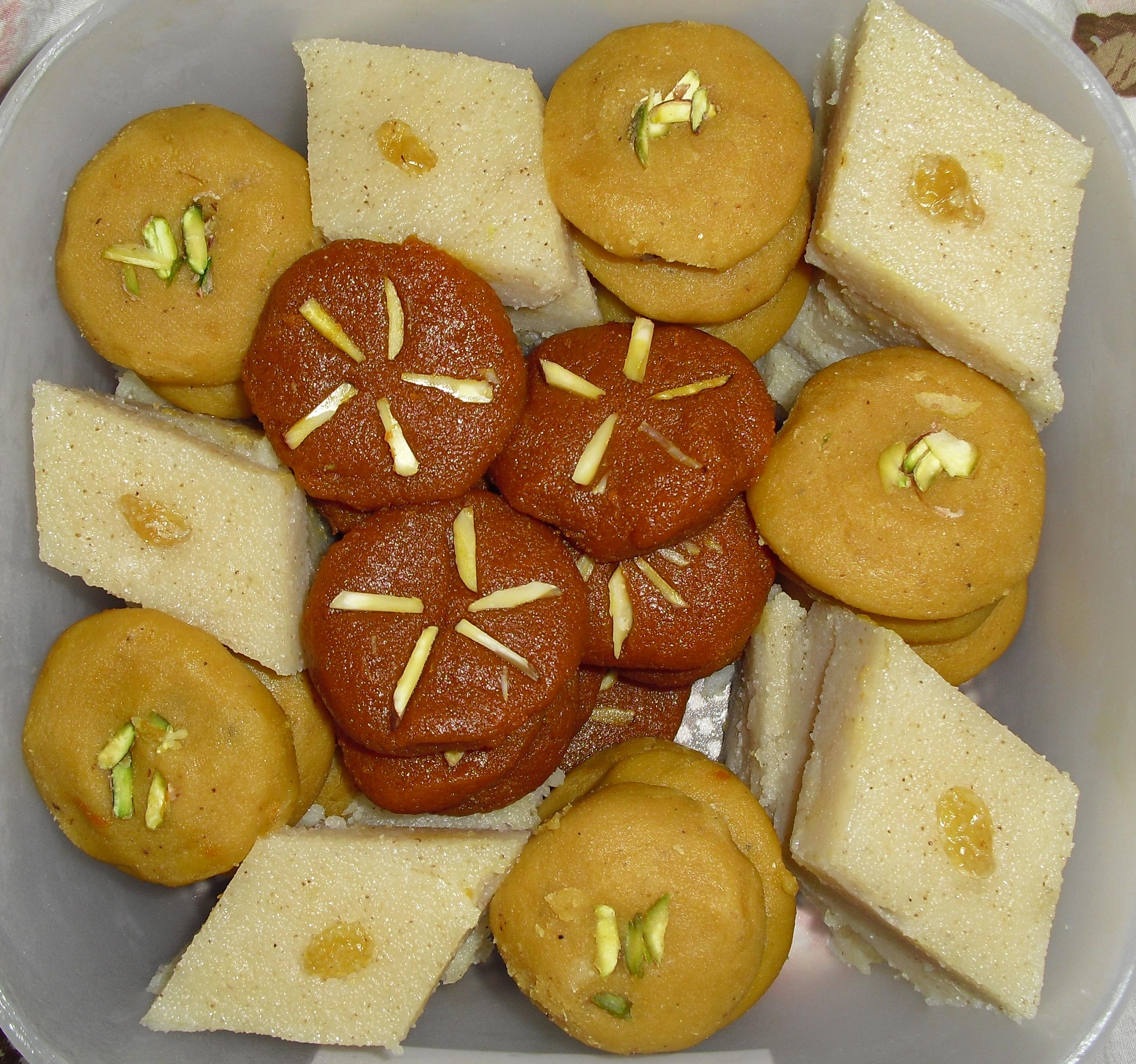
Gajar ka Halwa as mithai (red discs present in middle)

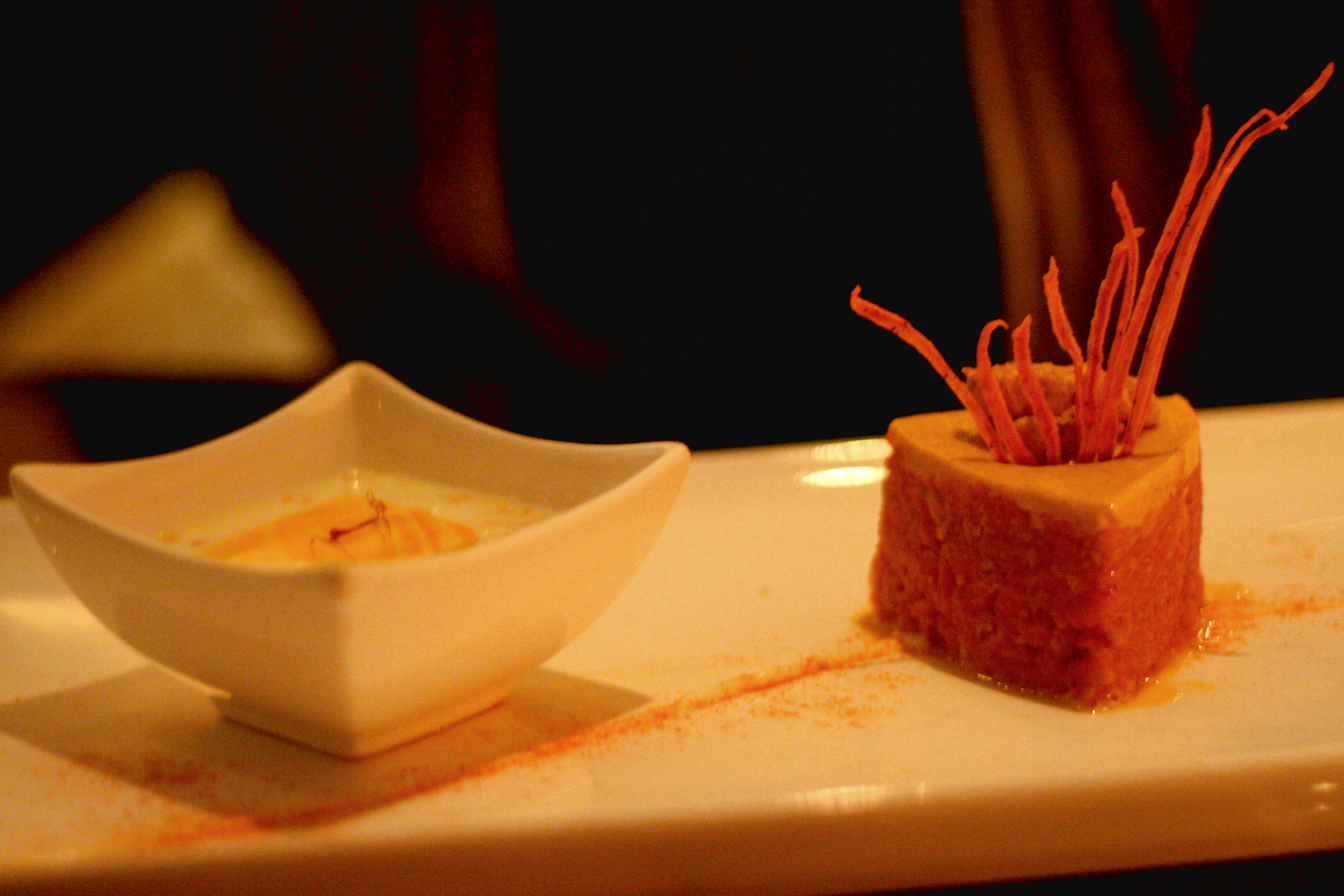
Gajar ka halwa served with kheer

Red velvet carrot halwa is a variation of the gajar ka halwa. It is made by heating a comparatively large amount of milk cream along with carrots, sugar, rose water and saffron over low flame.

Other lesser-known variations include carrot and beetroot halwa, cheese gajar ka halwa, khajur gajar ka halwa and carrot dessert. Cheese gajar ka halwa is prepared with a combination of purple carrots and ricotta. This dish is popular in northern India because purple carrots are mostly grown there.

== See also ==
- Indian cuisine
- Pakistani cuisine
- Bangladeshi cuisine
- Halwa
- Pudding
- List of carrot dishes
- List of Pakistani sweets and desserts
- List of Indian sweets and dessert
