= Candied carrots =

Vegetable side dish

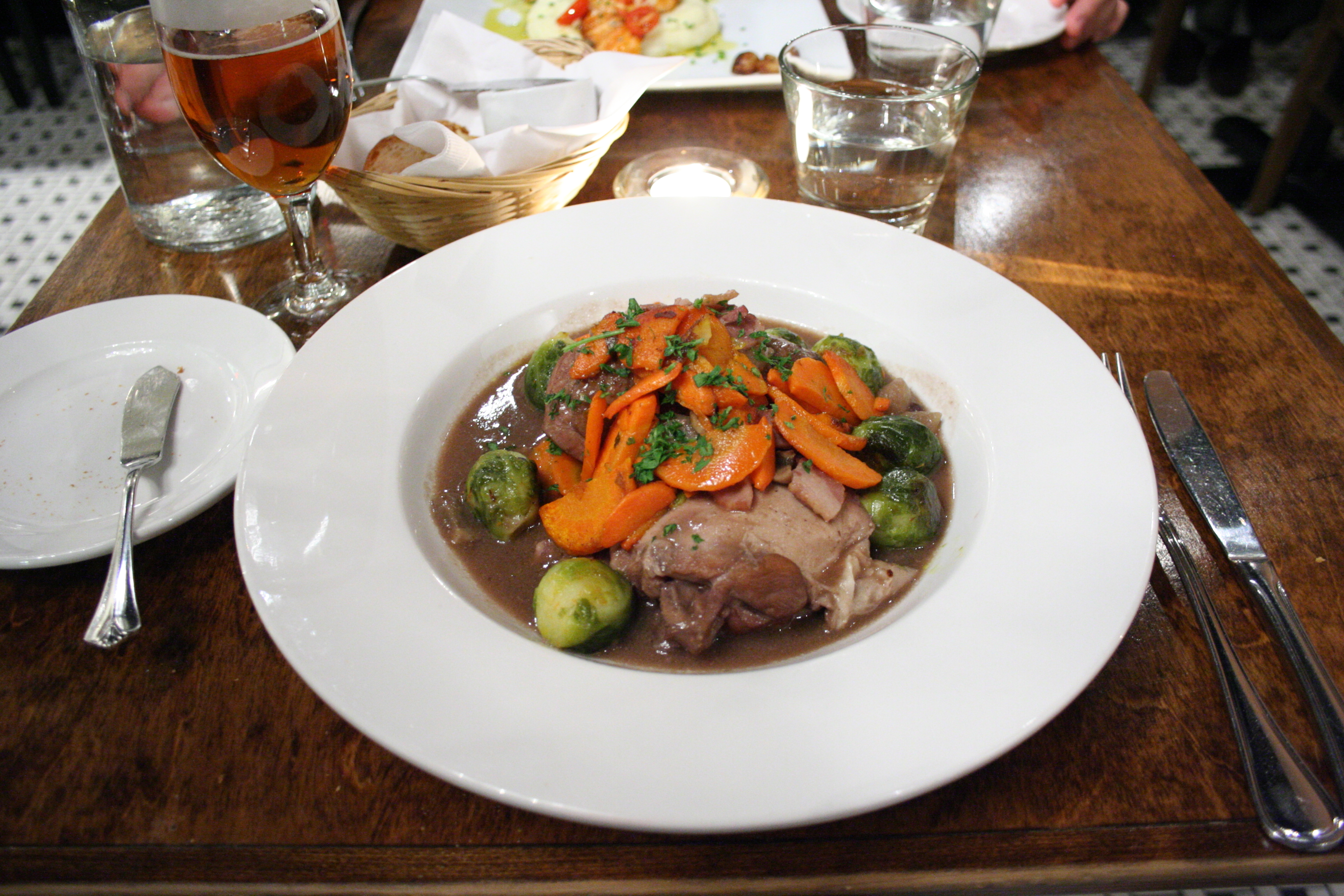
- Glazed carrots served over coq au vin
- Type: Side dish
- Main ingredients: Carrots, butter, sugar

Glazed carrots or candied carrots are a vegetable side dish in Europe and the United States made with carrots caramelized in butter and brown sugar, sometimes with the addition of an acidic ingredient like orange juice. It is considered a traditional food, similar to scalloped potatoes or dinner rolls. Some families in the United States serve it as a side for baked ham on Easter.

There are many ways to make glazed carrots. Most recipes for glazed carrots will begin by gently pre-cooking the carrots, either by steaming or some other method. For the classic recipe, the carrots are cooked in a thin butter and sugar syrup. In Europe this version is one of the popular vegetable sides for roasted poultry and game meats. In the United States, glazed carrots are often served with roast meats of any kind, especially Thanksgiving turkey.

Substitutions in the classic recipe can be made to reduce the saturated fat content, or trying different types of sugars, and additional flavors like citrus, mint or cinnamon. Longer cooking of carrots helps to caramelize their natural sugars and convert starches to dextrin. One method skips the added sugar by reducing the cooking liquid to a naturally sweet starch-thickened glaze.

Glazed carrots are not as common as they once were. Slate.com wrote of them: "Glazed carrots have a slightly fusty, mid-century vibe about them, as though they'd feel right at home sitting on a table next to meatloaf and Jell-O salad ... But they're hardly obsolete". Some scholars have noted that foods like "glazed carrots" and "scalloped potatoes" are frequently served at informal meals as vegetable sides for foods, such as "Hungarian goulash", that remain attached to certain ethnic identities while also part of American cuisine.
