= Carrot juice =

Juice produced from carrots

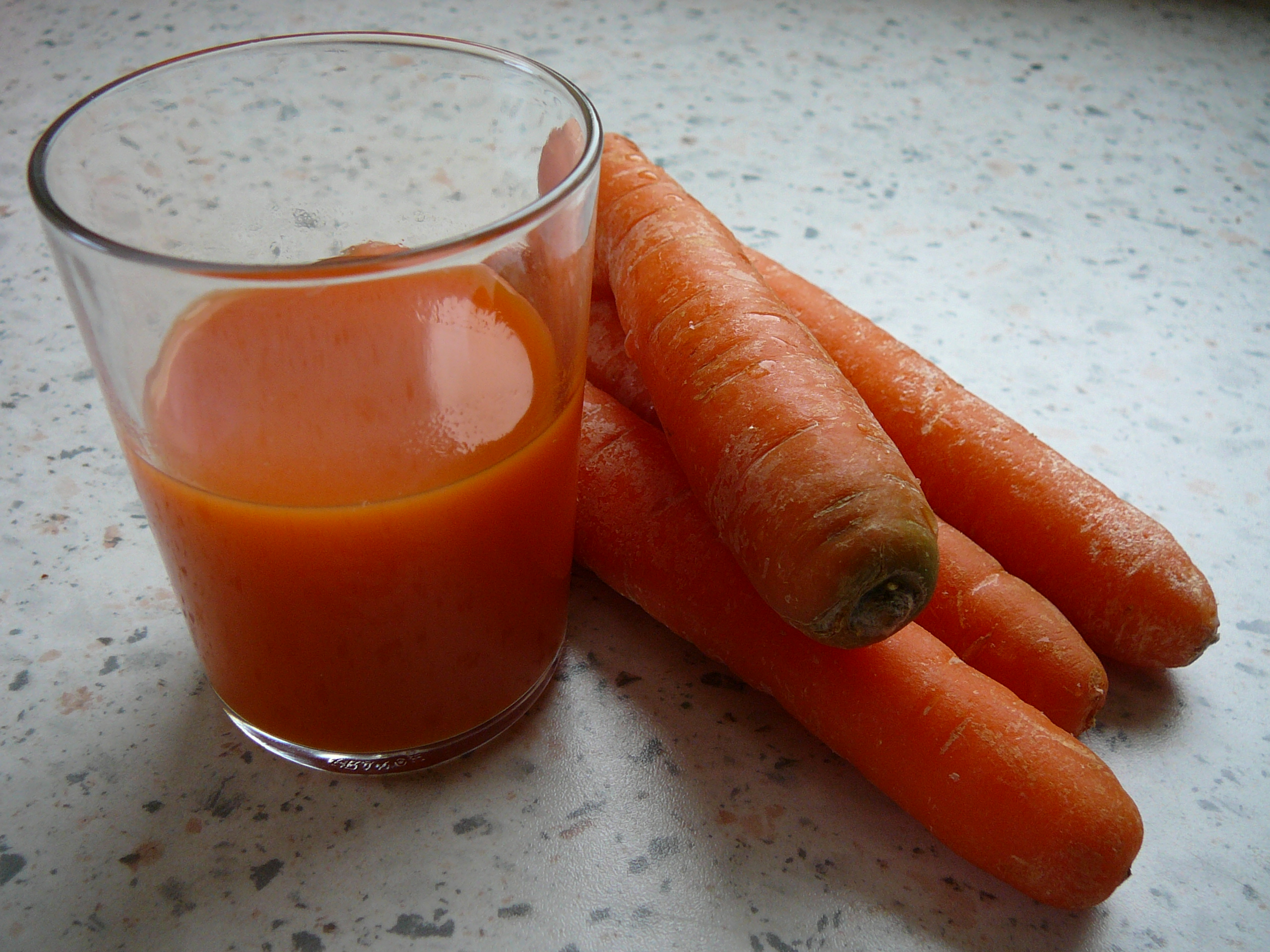
Carrot juice in a glass with four carrots

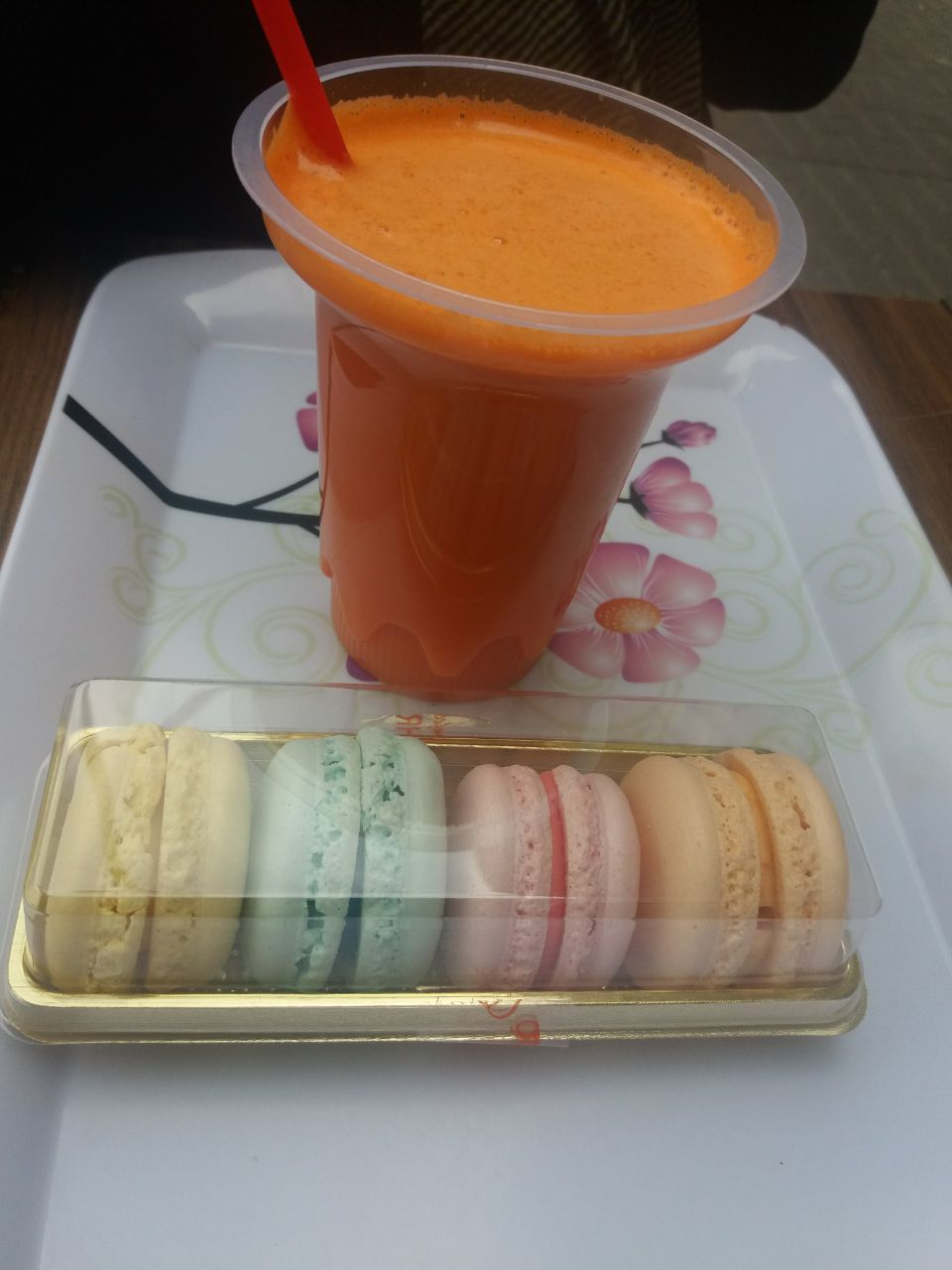
A glass of carrot juice

Carrot juice is juice produced from carrots. The amount of juice from carrots is a low yield compared to fruits like apples and oranges. However, because carrot pulp is fibrous, the main difficulty in juicing carrots is in separating the pulp from the juice. Methods used to juice carrots include mechanical pressing, high-pressure processing, cold pressing, enzyme-assisted extraction, solvent extraction, and supercritical carbon dioxide methods.

Carrot juice has a high content of β-carotene, a provitamin for vitamin A, and a flavor of concentrated carrots.

== Nutrition ==
In a reference amount of 100 g (3.5 oz), canned carrot juice contains the following nutritional information:

- Water content: 89 g
- Food Energy : 170 kJ (40 kcal)
- Protein: 0.95 g
- Fat: 0.15 g
- Carbohydrates: 9.28 g
- Dietary fibers: 0.8 g

== See also ==
- V8
- Juicing
- List of carrot dishes
- List of juices
