= Koreans in Ukraine =

Ethnic group

Total population
- 10,000–40,000 (2023)

Languages
- Russian, Korean, Ukrainian

Related ethnic groups
- Korean diaspora

There are populations of ethnic Koreans and South Korean nationals in Ukraine. A significant group among them are ethnic Koreans called Koryo-saram: these people arrived in the former Russian Empire and Soviet Union before and during the Japanese colonial period and spread throughout the region especially after their forced migration in 1937. Another group, the Sakhalin Koreans, are Koreans who lived on the island of Sakhalin and are often considered culturally distinct from other Koryo-saram. There are also South Korean expatriates in Ukraine.

It is uncertain how many ethnic Koreans are in Ukraine; estimates vary from 10,000 to over 40,000. A 2021 South Korean Ministry of Foreign Affairs (MOFA) report gave the number as 13,524. However, another page on the MOFA website in 2023 gave a rough estimate of around 30,000 Koryo-saram in Ukraine. In 2020, there were reportedly 612 South Korean nationals living in Ukraine.

== History ==
Koryo-saram have lived in Ukraine since at latest 1922. By 1926, there were 103 Koreans living in Ukraine. The number gradually increased, reaching 1,341 in 1959, 4,480 in 1970, 8,669 by 1989, and 12,711 in 2001.

Koryo-saram first began moving to Ukraine in significant numbers around 1967. After the Khrushchev Thaw, when restrictions on internal movement in the Soviet Union were eased, Koreans moved between the various Soviet republics. They first came as seasonal agricultural workers, mainly in the southern regions.

After South Korea and Ukraine established diplomatic relations in 1992, some Koreans in Ukraine moved to South Korea for work. Since then, some have returned to Ukraine, while others move back and forth between the two countries. By 2019, a significant portion of Koreans engaged in this practice, with one interviewee estimating that one to two people in every Korean Ukrainian family have been to South Korea for work. Work visas for ethnic Korean returnee workers are reportedly easy to obtain, which contributes to this phenomenon.

In 1995, Kan Den Sik organized a Korean division at the Kyiv Polytechnic Institute. By 2017, it had developed into a full separate department of Korean philology. Kan founded the Korean Cultural Center in 2010 and became its president. Kan was a second-generation Korean, whose parents were Sakhalin Koreans.

=== Russo-Ukrainian War ===
The 2014 to present Russo-Ukrainian War has caused several significant shifts for Koreans in Ukraine. Following the 2014 Crimean status referendum, around 3,000 Korean residents living in Crimea became Russian citizens. During the fighting, many temporarily fled to South Korea for refuge.

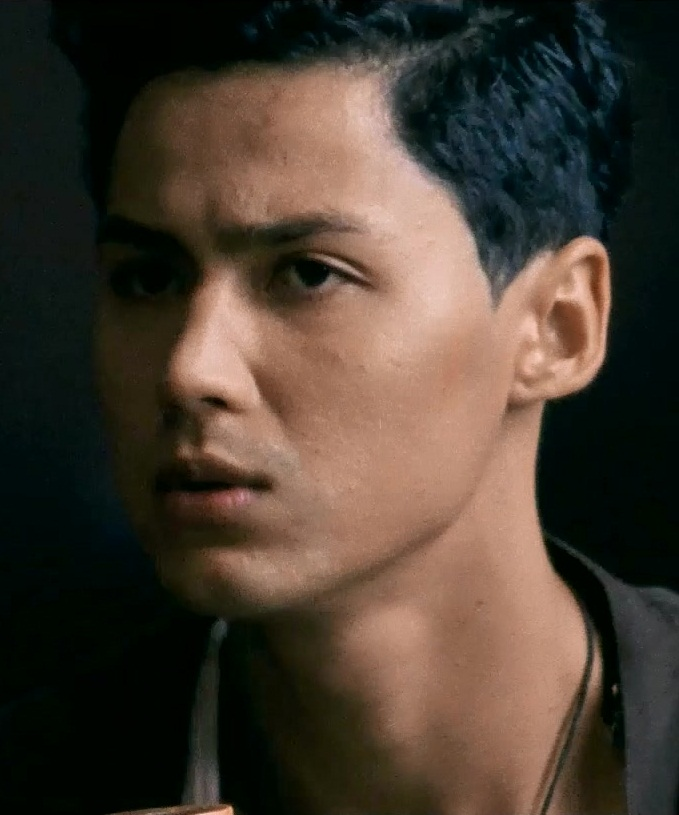
Pavlo Lee, a Ukrainian Koryo-saram, was killed during the Battle of Irpin on March 6, 2022.

The 2022 Russian invasion of Ukraine has especially caused significant instability. One survey in South Korea found that 42.8% of Korean Ukrainians had a family member who died during the war. According to one interviewee in South Korea, they knew many ethnic Korean children who died in the conflict.

Some fled for the second time to South Korea, with some thinking of remaining there due to the instability in Ukraine. The South Korean government issued a number of 90-day short-term G-1 visas for ethnic Korean refugees. Visas needed to be renewed every six months. In November 2022, it was reported that hundreds were waiting for approval for refuge in South Korea. However, refugees were made to pay fees to apply for their stay in South Korea; this requirement was eventually lifted on March 26, 2023.

In December 2022, it was reported that 3,438 of the 5,205 Ukrainians living in South Korea were ethnic Koreans. By March 2023, it was reported that 1,200 Ukrainian Koryo-saram refugees had entered South Korea since the beginning of the war. Many congregated in the Koryo-saram communities of Ttaetgol Village and Gwangju Koryoin Village. They are reportedly mainly women and children, as men were prohibited from leaving the country. One visa renewal request was rejected in 2023, which sparked controversy. The family had remained stateless after the 1991 collapse of the Soviet Union, and did not have documents that proved their identity beyond a birth certificate.

South Koreans volunteered to assist the refugees and donated hundreds of thousands of dollars for their expenses. It was reported that by November 2022, the funds were running low, although new fundraising efforts were underway. They also faced a number of other challenges, including issues relating to visa renewal, language barriers, and finding employment. Trauma from the conflict has also created issues. South Korean activists pushed for the issuing of more F-4 work visas (normally for ethnic Korean returnees) for the refugees. Schools for refugee children were organized and staffed by volunteers.

A number of South Koreans have served as foreign fighters in the Russo-Ukrainian War, although they are officially prohibited from doing so by the South Korean government. In 2023, it was reported that violators faced up to a year in prison and a maximum fine of 10 million won (US$7,500). By 2023, there had been four fighters convicted of serving in Ukraine. One such fighter, a former South Korean Navy SEAL Rhee Keun (also called Ken Rhee) was arrested immediately after his three-month stint in Ukraine and return. He fully cooperated with the following investigation, and was eventually convicted and given a suspended prison sentence. Rhee apologized for breaking the law, but expressed no remorse for volunteering. He reportedly received an offer of Ukrainian citizenship and land from the Ukrainian government, but declined the offer.

== Culture ==
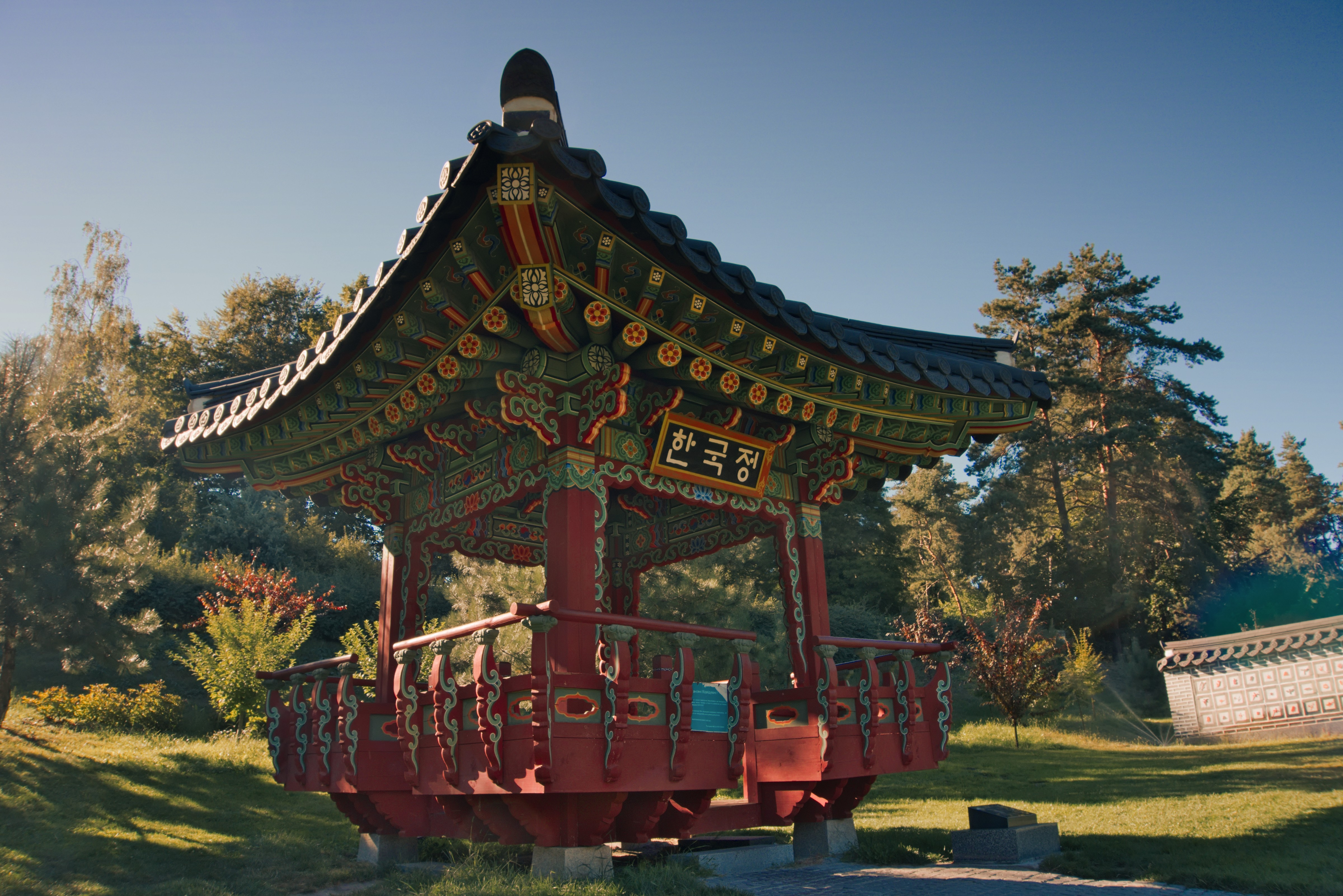
A Korean-style garden, with a Korean pavilion, in Kyiv (2018)

As many are several generations removed from the Korean peninsula and because their ancestors were discouraged from speaking Korean by the Soviet government, a significant majority of Koreans in Ukraine does not speak Korean. In recent years, many Korean language schools have developed, with schools reportedly present in Kyiv, Kharkiv, Odesa, and elsewhere. The Kyiv Linguistics University offers professional-level courses in the language. The Taras Shevchenko National University of Kyiv also offered Korean language courses around 2019.

Since 1995, an annual festival called Koreada has been held in different cities of Ukraine. It was first held in Kyiv, and in 2019 was held in Kryvyi Rih, which had the highest concentration of Korean residents in the Podniprovya and Zaporizhzhia regions. The festival celebrates Korean culture. There is a traditional Korean group associated with the festival called Toradi. The group has performed at the festival every year, and has traveled to South Korea to expand their repertoire. Reception to Korean culture has reportedly been positive in Ukraine.

Many Korean cultural activities and organizations in Ukraine are sponsored and funded by the South Korean government. This includes the volunteer-run Association of the Koreans of Ukraine, of which Kan was also the head of as of 2019. In 2017, an exhibition was held in South Korea, showing photographs of the daily lives of Korean Ukrainians.

Koreans in Ukraine share the culture of Koryo-saram cuisine, including the staple side dish of morkovcha (a carrot-based variant of kimchi). Ukrainian cuisine is also widely consumed.

== Notable people ==
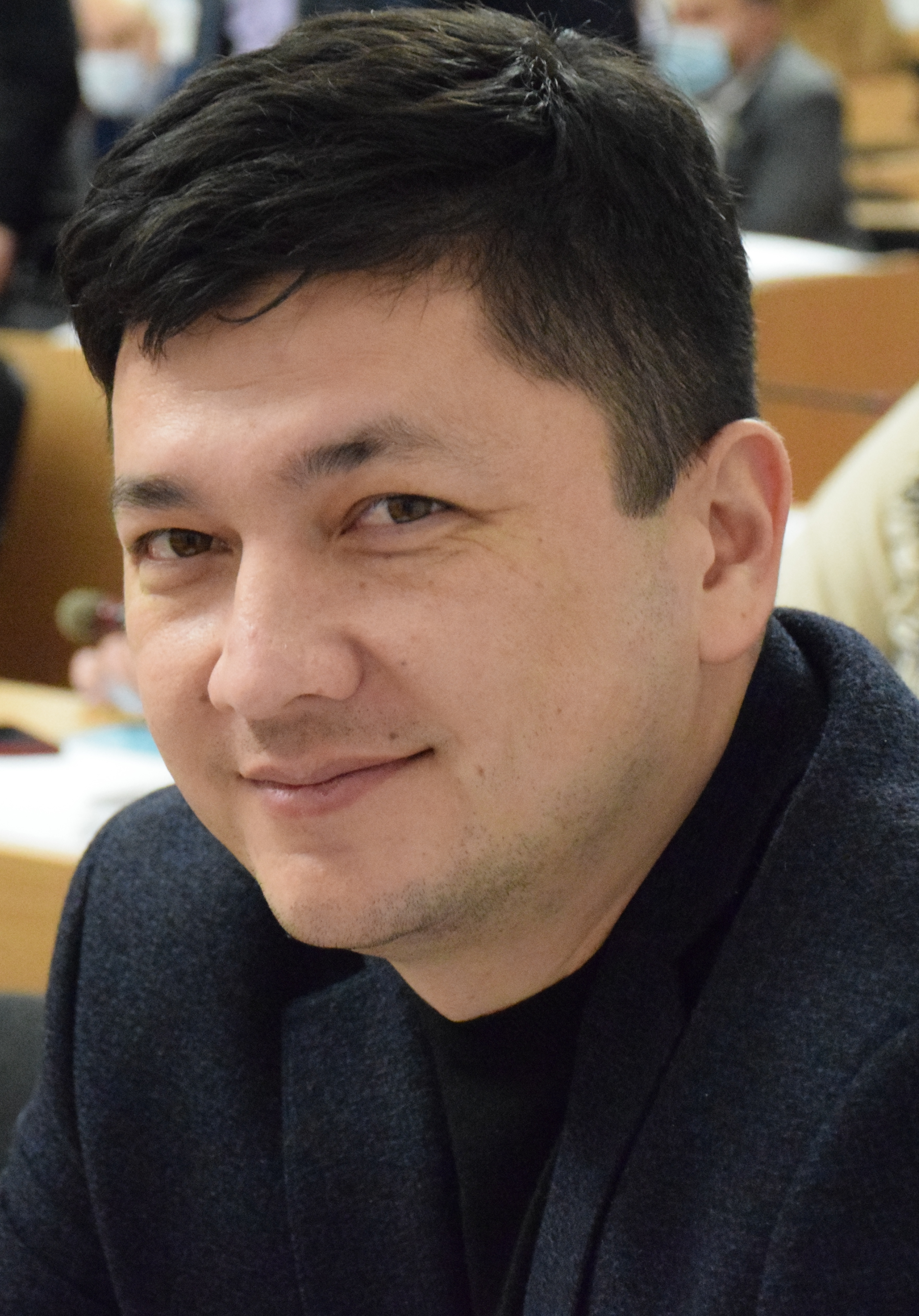
Vitalii Kim, ethnic Korean governor of Mykolaiv Oblast (2020)

Oleksandr Sin served as mayor of Zaporizhzhia from 2010 to 2015. Vitalii Kim has served as the governor of Mykolaiv Oblast since November 25, 2022.

== See also ==
- Category:Ukrainian people of Korean descent
- Category:Koryo-saram communities in South Korea
