= Ttaetgol Village =

Koryo-saram enclave in Ansan, South Korea

Ttaetgol Village Ttekkol Samgori
- Neighborhood
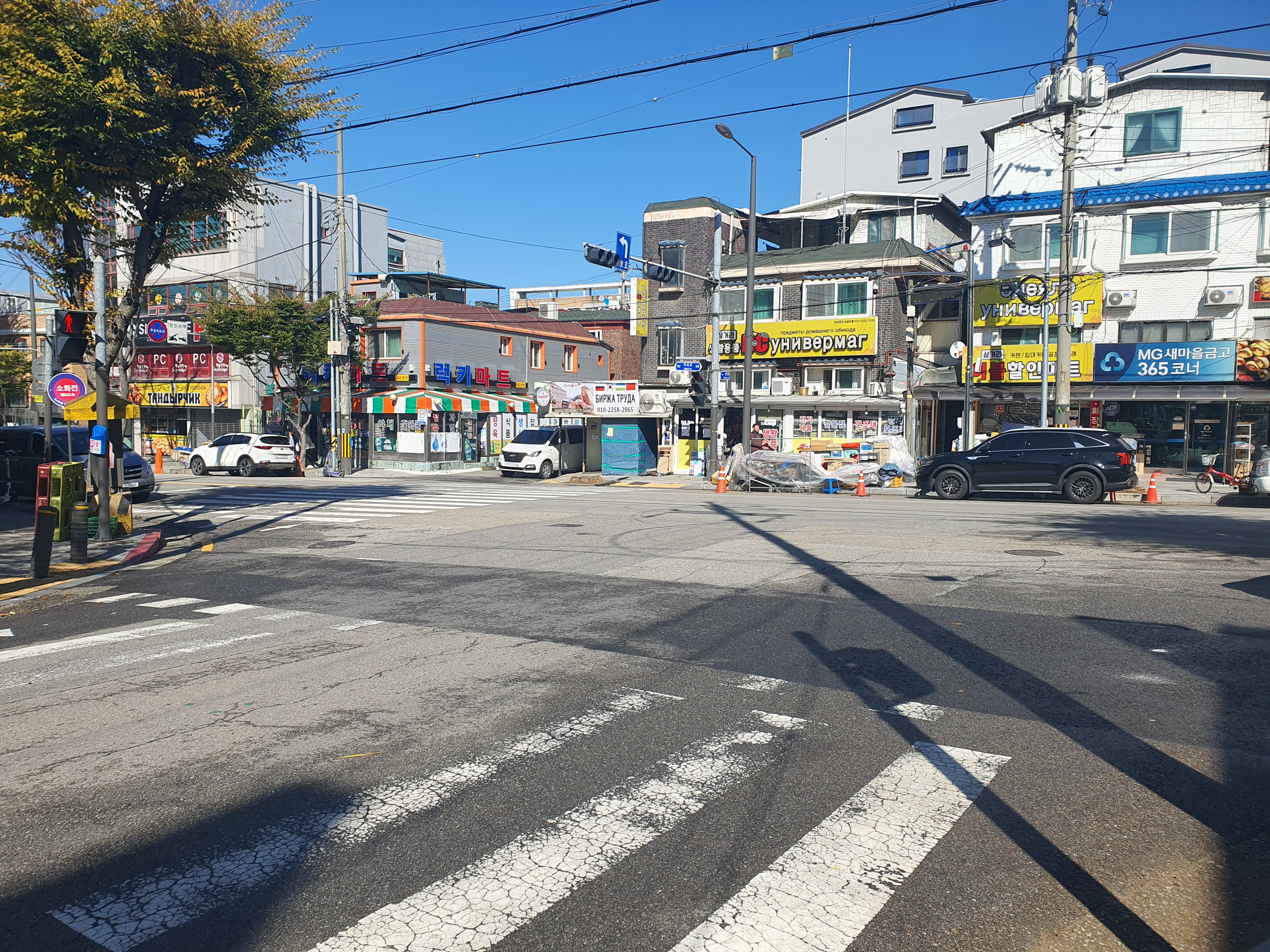
- The main threeway intersection in the enclave; signs in Cyrillic script are visible (2023)
- Interactive map of Ttaetgol Village
- Coordinates: 37.3397°N 126.7949°E
- Country: South Korea
- Province: Gyeonggi Province
- City: Ansan
- District: Danwon District
- Dong: Seonbu-dong
- Named for: Tti, Korean name for Imperata cylindrica

Population
  - Estimate (2022): 7,000 (Koryo-saram)
- Website: www.jamir.or.kr/main/main.php (Neomeo's homepage, in English)

Ttaegol Village (Korean: 땟골마을), alternatively Ddaetgol Village, is an enclave of Koryo-saram (ethnic Koreans of the mainland former Soviet Union) in Seonbu-dong, Danwon District, Ansan, Gyeonggi Province, South Korea. In Russian, the area goes by Ttekkol Samgori (Russian: Ттэкколь Самгори, Теколь Самгори), where "samgori" (삼거리; samgeori) is Korean for "three-way intersection". Around August 2022, around 7,000 people in the village were Koryo-saram. Along with Gwangju Koryoin Village, it is one of the largest Koryo-saram enclaves in the country.

By August 2022, 12% of the total population of Ansan was of foreign nationality. There is another Koryo-saram enclave in Ansan, which is located in Sangnok District. In August 2022, the total Koryo-saram population in Ansan was around 18,000.

== Etymology ==
The village was once called Tti Village (띠골), where tti is the Korean name for grass of the species Imperata cylindrica. The pronunciation of the village's name drifted over time until it became its current form.

== History ==
=== Early history ===
During the Korean War, refugees took shelter in the area and did not become entangled in the fighting. This led to a belief that the area warded off misfortune.

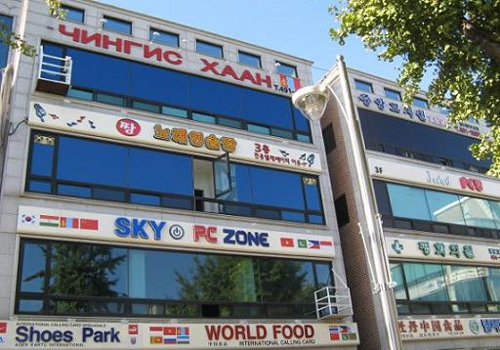
International businesses in the nearby Wongok-dong. Note the Cyrillic sign at the top. (2010)

Koryo-saram began arriving in the area after 1992, as movement restrictions were eased after the collapse of the Soviet Union. The economies of the former Soviet states were impacted, which led to Koryo-saram seeking opportunities in South Korea. Ttaetgol was favored for its lower cost of living, as well as its proximity to factories, schools, and the capital Seoul. The area is actually next to Wongok-dong, which is itself host to a large immigrant community of Joseon-jok (the Korean diaspora in China) and workers from South East Asia. A change to foreign employment visas in April 2007 led to another increase in the Koryo-saram population. The area grew through word of mouth, until it became significant by the early 2010s. Around 2011, the Koryo-saram population was around 2,000.

=== Growth ===
In October 2011, a night school called "Neomeo" (너머) for learning the Korean language was created for Koryo-saram in the area. The school was founded by Kim Seung-ryeok (김승력). Kim later said that he founded the school because he had heard that Koryo-saram were encountering difficulties and discrimination in South Korean society often due to their language barriers, so he wanted to assist them. The school also offers a wide array of services. It offers assistance in civil rights, worker's rights, immigration, translation, job placement, and space for community activities. A second branch of the school was opened in 2014 for a smaller Koryo-saram community in Sangnok District, elsewhere in the city. The school also started a local market where residents swapped and exchanged goods that they no longer needed, and organized meetings between South Korean and Koryo-saram residents to discuss common issues.

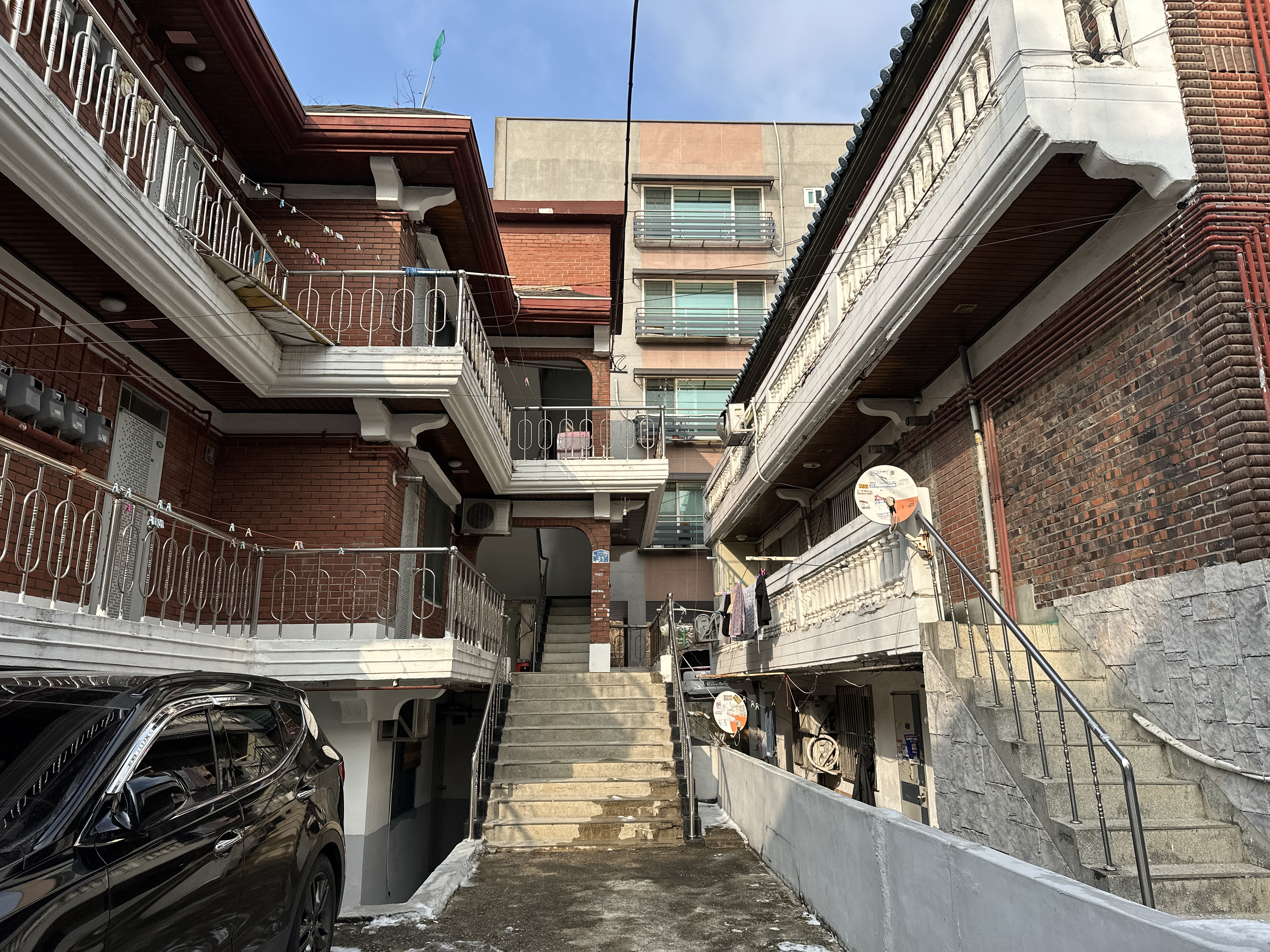
Apartments in the village (2023)

Before the return migration of Koryo-saram began, the area had had an aging population, and had many empty houses. The immigrants rejuvenated the community, as they brought their families along with them, which led to an increase in the number of children in the area. Around 2014, the local Seonil Elementary School had been on the brink of closure before the migration. By 2022, 70% of the 300 students at the school were children of immigrants, and 90% of that group were Koryo-saram. The school had to urgently prepare Russian-speaking teachers and after school Korean language programs.

The community had some friction with the South Korean residents, due to miscommunications over how the South Korean garbage sorting system works, as well as terms of rental leases.

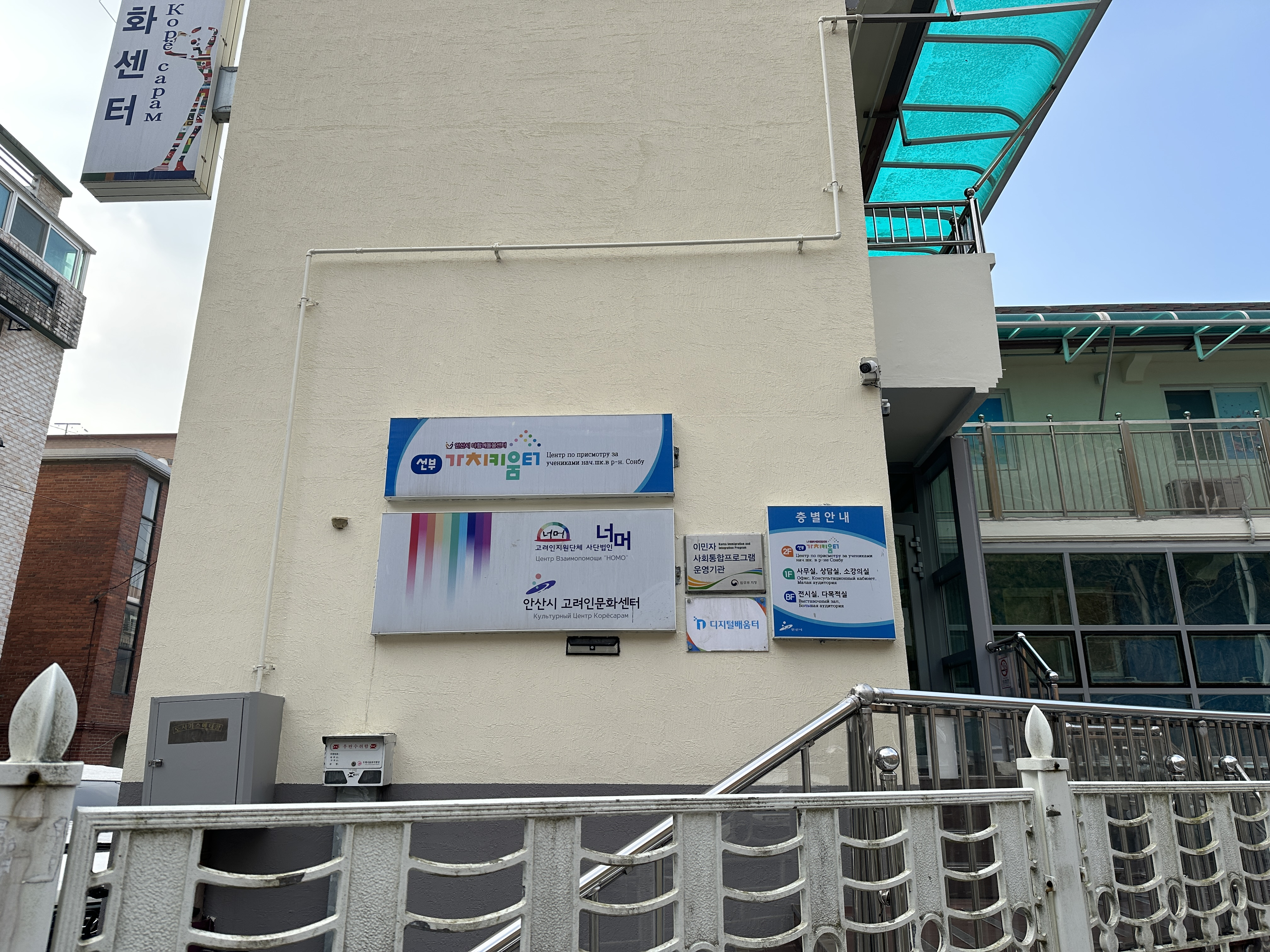
Side of the community center; a sign for Neomeo can be seen on the building (2023)

In 2014, the district and city governments began devoting more attention to developing support institutions for Koryo-saram in the area. With help from the South Korean National Assembly, they secured over 1 billion won for various programs. The city established offices specifically to assist foreign residents. They also constructed a three-floored Koryo-saram community center that opened on October 10, 2015. The community center includes an exhibition and conference space in the basement, a Korean language education and counseling center on the first floor, and a youth study room and after-school programs on the second floor.

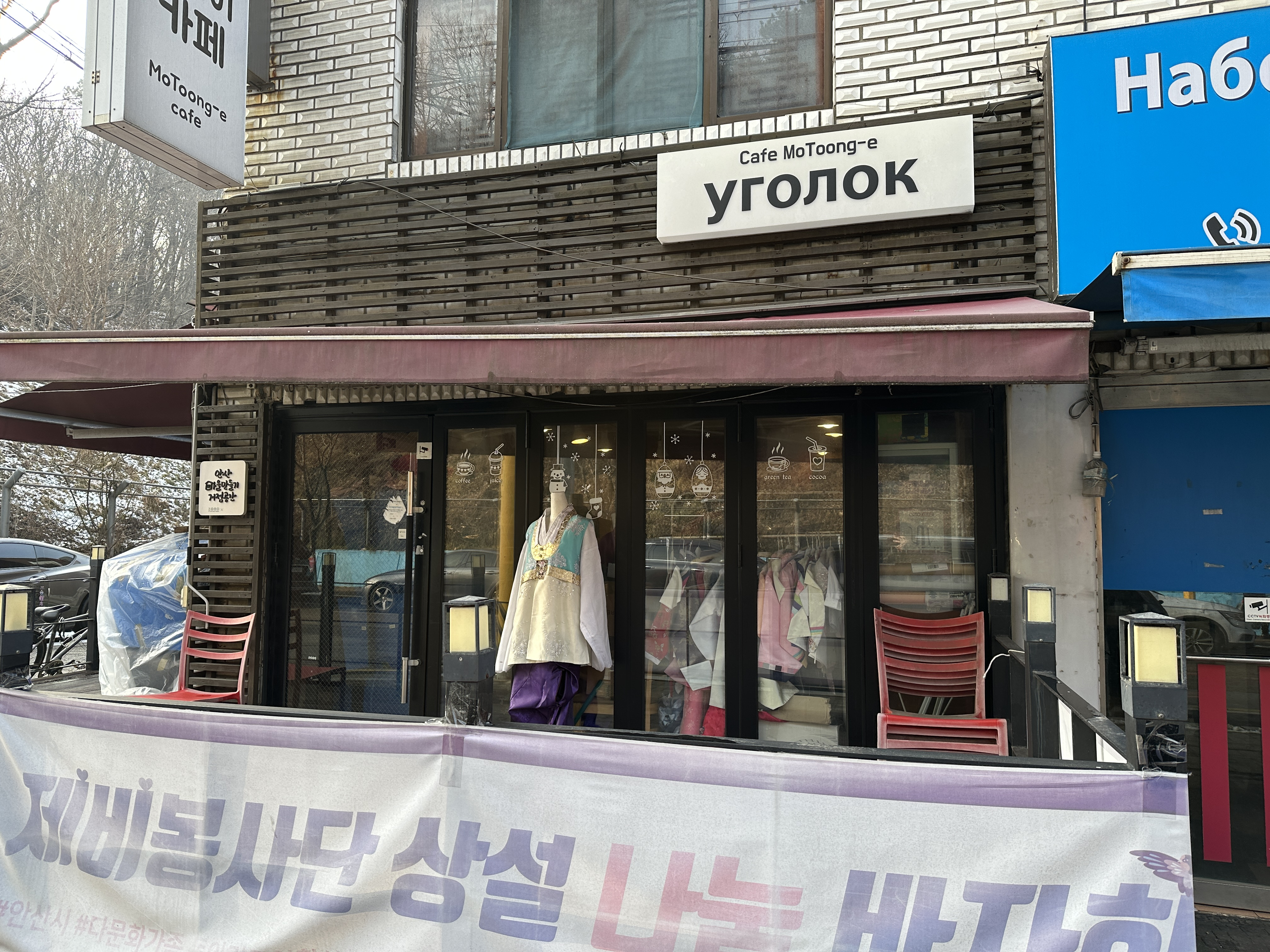
Ugolok (2023)

A cafe for language exchange was also opened in late June 2015, and was called "Koryoin Cafe Ugolok" (고려인 카페 우갈록), where ugolok (Russian: уголок) means a "comfortable place". The cafe served Russian and Koryo-saram cuisine. Around 2016, it was reported that around 90% of the residents in the area were Koryo-saram.

The streets are reportedly quiet for much of the day, as people are away at work. Many signs are in Cyrillic, and a significant proportion of the residents are primarily Russian speakers.

== See also ==
- Hometown Village – an enclave of Sakhalin Koreans, also in Ansan
