= Sasechungyeolmun =

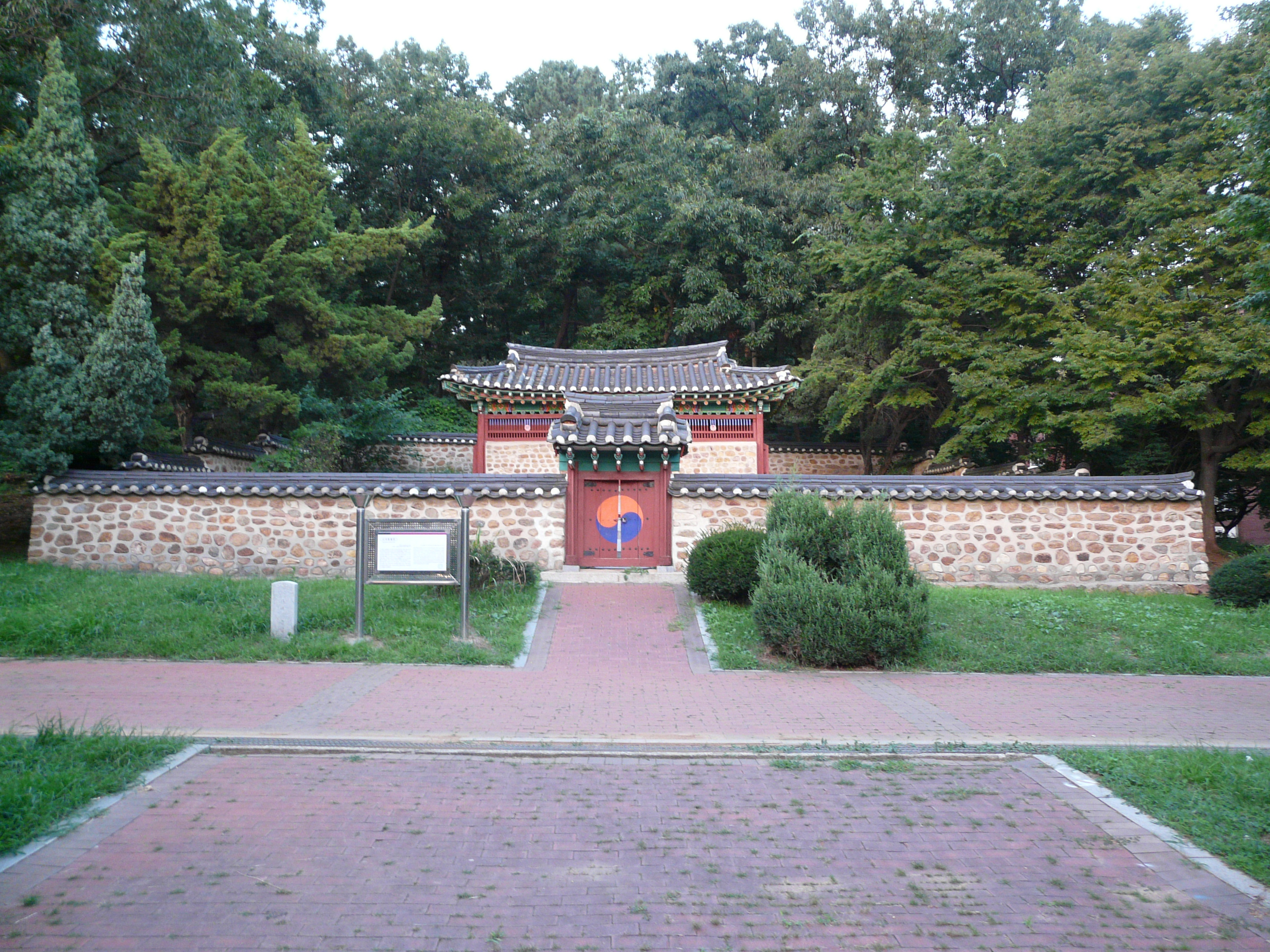
Sasechungryeolmun

Sasechungryeolmun (Hangul: 사세충렬문, Hanja: 四世忠烈門), lit. Shrine of Loyalty, Virtue and Filial Duty. Sasechungryeolmun is a historic pair of two wooden gates dedicated to Kim Yeo-mul (1548–1592), and the four generations of the female members of his family who had committed suicide.

The monument is located in Wa-dong, Danwon-gu, Ansan, Gyeonggi Province, South Korea.

== Background ==
Sasechungyeolmun is the main gate built by the country to commemorate Kim Yeo-mul (1548-1592) of the Suncheon Kim clan (순천 김씨), who died during the Imjin War, and the women of his family who were defeated by the Qing army and died during the Byeongja Horan. The current building was rebuilt in 1971 and was then renovated in 1983.

Kim Yeo-mul was a general who, along with Shin Rip, fought against the Japanese in Chungju when the Imjin War broke out, but was unable to defeat the Japanese and threw himself into the river and died.

The four women are: Lady Park of the Hamyang Park clan (함양 박씨; 1548-?), the wife of Kim Yeo-mul; Lady Ryu of the Jinju Ryu clan (진주 류씨; 1571-?), the wife of his son Kim Ryu (김류; 1571 - 5 March 1648); Lady Park of the Goryeong Park clan (고령 박씨; 1590-?), the wife of his grandson Kim Gyeong-jing (김경징; 1589 - 22 February 1637); and Lady Jeong of the Jinju Jeong clan (진주 정씨; 1614-?), the wife of his great-grandson Kim Jin-pyo (김진표; 1614–1671).

The building consists of 3 kan in the front and 2 kan on the side, with a door in the form of a private house gate in the middle and a signboard that reads “Sasechungyeolmun” is hung.

The inside is divided into two rooms. The right room has a hardwood floor, the main gate of Kim Yeo-mul's loyal servant, and the left room has the front door of the four women.

In front of the monument, a sign tells the history behind the four women and Kim Yeo-mul:

“Pavilion for Commemorative Plaques for Kim Yeo-mul’s Family

Gyeonggi-do Cultural Heritage Material No. 8

This pavilion was constructed to house commemorative plaques for Kim Yeo-mul (1548-1592), a civil official of the Joseon period, and four virtuous ladies of his family.

When the Japanese invaded Joseon in 1592, Kim Yeo-mul fought against the invaders in the Chungju area and was killed in action. A commemorative plaque was bestowed by the government in honor of his loyal devotion, and it is now housed in the right section of this pavilion. His tomb and stele are located behind the pavilion.

The four commemorative plaques in the left section of the pavilion are for Kim Yeo-mul’s wife Lady Park, daughter-in-law Lady Yu, granddaughter-in-law Lady Park, and great-granddaughter-in-law Lady Jeong. During the Manchu Invasions of 1636-1637, they took refuge in Ganghwado Island and committed suicide to preserve their chastity.

These commemorative plaques were intended to be hung on gates, but are currently stored in this pavilion for preservation. The pavilion was reconstructed in 1979. The wooden plaque hung on this building reads "Sasechungyeolmun (四世忠烈門)," meaning "commemorative gates of four generations."
