= Hosu-dong =

Neighbourhood of Ansan, South Korea

- Hangul: 호수동
- Hanja: 湖水洞
- RR: Hosu-dong
- MR: Hosu-dong

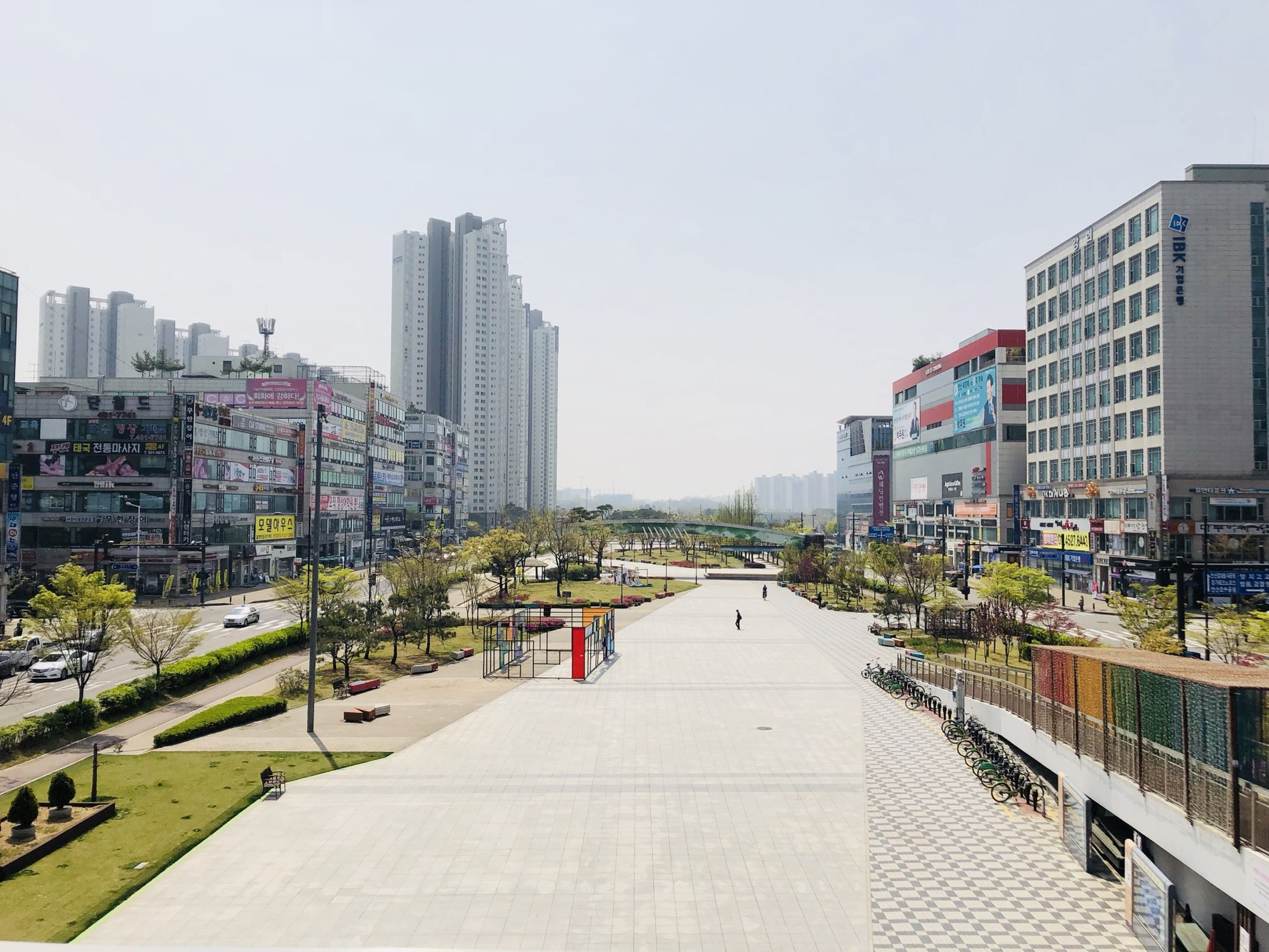
Ansan Culture Plaza in Hosu-dong

Hosu-dong (Korean: 호수동) is dong (neighborhood) of Danwon District, Ansan, Gyeonggi Province, South Korea. It is located in the center of the new city according to the second stage development plan of the new city in Ansan. It is a residential city where large-scale apartment and general housing are combined, and has various urban structures where education, culture, commerce, and business facilities are concentrated.

== History ==
Gojan-dong, under the jurisdiction of Hosu-dong, was called Gojan-ri, Inhwa-myeon, Ansan-gun during the Joseon period, and was renamed Gojan-ri, Suam-myeon, Siheung-gun in 1914.

There were Dori Island and Chilban as natural villages, and Dori Island is a village that looks like an island in the southwest of Gojan Station, and it is said to have been called Dori Island because it is wet when it is measured in Namyang area of Hwaseong-gun. Chilban was formed when refugees from Woongjin and Yeonbaek in Hwanghae-do were constructed on reclaimed land.

Currently, many changes have been made through the creation of large-scale apartment complexes in accordance with the second stage development plan of Ansan New Town.
