= Daebu-dong =

Neighborhood in Ansan, South Korea

- Hangul: 대부동
- Hanja: 大阜洞
- RR: Daebu-dong
- MR: Taebu-dong

Daebu-dong (Korean: 대부동) is a dong (neighborhood) of Danwon District, Ansan, Gyeonggi Province, South Korea.
