= Hanaan =

2011 Uzbek-South Korean drama film

- Directed by: Ruslan Pak
- Written by: Ruslan Pak
- Produced by: Ellen Y. D. Kim
- Starring: Stanislav Tyan; Bahodir Musaev; Ilbek Faiziev; Dmitry Eum; Ruslan Pak; Kkobbi Kim
- Production companies: Zamie Pictures; Flying Tiger Pictures
- Release date: 2011
- Countries: Uzbekistan, South Korea
- Language: Russian

Hanaan (Russian: Ханаан; Korean: 하나안) is a 2011 Uzbek-South Korean drama film by director Ruslan Pak.

Pak is a fourth generation Koryo-saram (Korean diaspora of the former Soviet Union). The film covers social issues for Koryo-saram and Uzbeks.

== Development ==
=== Background ===
Korean people were forced to migrate from eastern Russia to Central Asia in 1937. This led to a diaspora population called Koryo-saram in areas like Uzbekistan and Kazakhstan that persists. Due to a combination of Soviet assimilationist policies and necessity, Koryo-saram rapidly forgot the Korean language. Despite this, they still maintained a significant ethnic identity.

Around 2017, the South Korean Ministry of Foreign Affairs reported that there were around 500,000 ethnic Koreans in the former Soviet Union (Commonwealth of Independent States). Uzbek Koreans are the largest group, with a population of around 150,000.

Due to a revision of the 1999 Overseas Koreans Act in 2004, Uzbeks began repatriating to South Korea at greater rates. In 2017, among foreign nationals living in South Korea, Koryo-saram with Uzbek citizenship formed the third largest group, followed by Koreans with Chinese citizenship and Korean Americans.

=== Creation ===
Director Ruslan Pak grew up in a household that did not speak Korean. As a child, he learned the Korean martial art taekwondo and Korean, which created a heimat, an idealized image of his ancestral homeland, in his mind. Pak enrolled in a film studies course at the Graduate School of the Korea National University of Arts in Seoul in 2006, and produced this film as his graduation work. He sought to portray his experience as a diaspora Korean accurately.

Like many other Koryo-saram who visit South Korea, Pak had mixed feelings his experience. He said in an interview, "I began learning Korean in search of my identity, but I felt disappointed when I actually came to Korea. I didn't feel embraced by the society". Many ended up returning to Uzbekistan. Of the issue of identity, Pak said:

As a [Koryo-saram], I have always felt different. But from a certain moment I began to think of my otherness as an advantage rather than a disadvantage. Now I knew my dual identity would be an advantage in my life.

The film debuted at the 16th Busan International Film Festival in South Korea. It received much attention, and was also shown at other major international film festivals. Pak acquired permanent residency status in South Korea.

== Reception ==
The film received positive reviews. The Hollywood Reporter wrote of it:

Pak's own background is near identical to that of his characters, and his intimate knowledge of the Korean-Uzbek situation — their cultural assimilation hampered by the fact that many can speak Russian but not Uzbek — gives his film a freshness and originality, which effectively counterbalances the predictability of Stas's painful path to perdition and redemption.
