= Gwangju Koryoin Village =

Ethnic enclave in Gwangju, South Korea

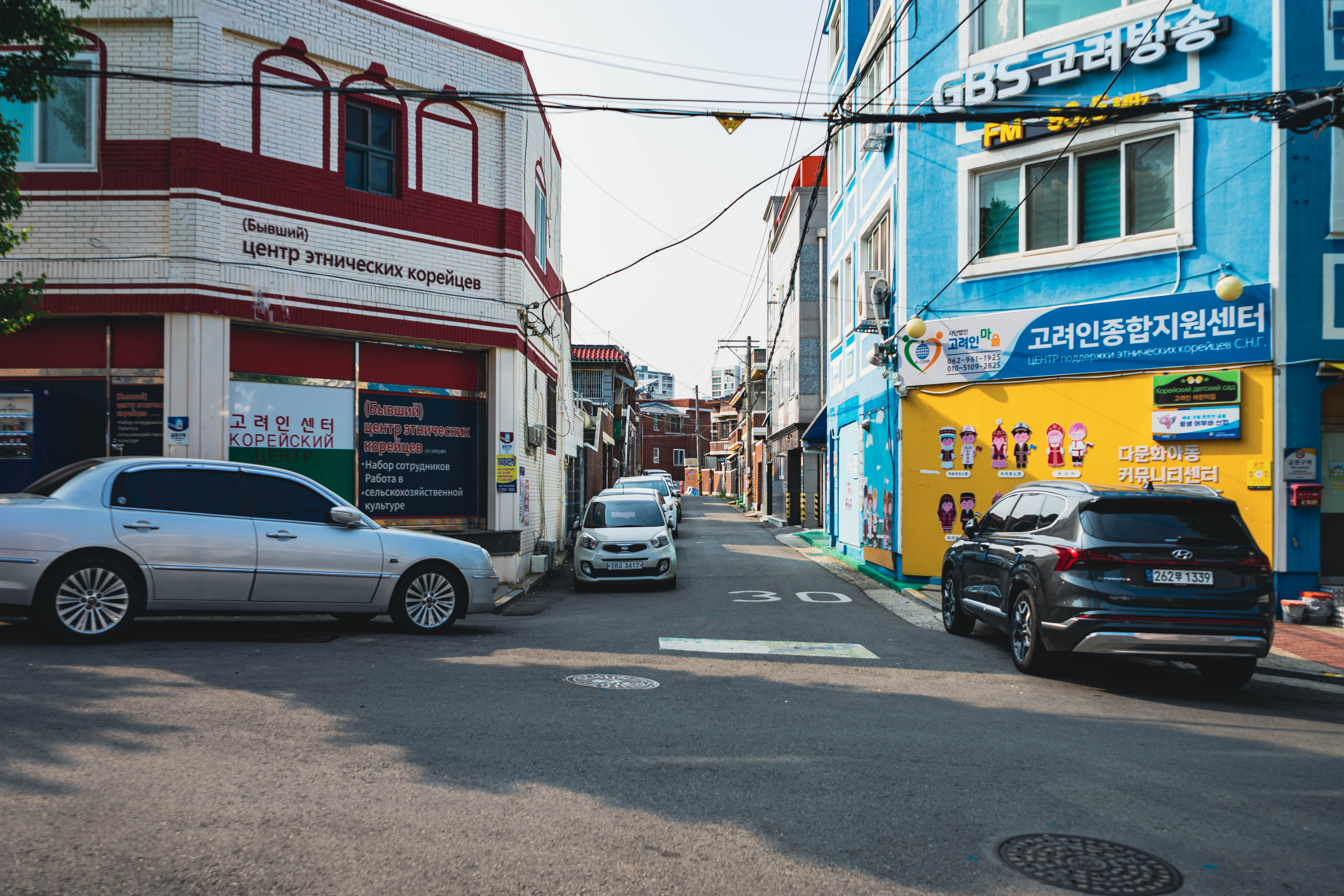
- Community centers of the village on left and right (2022)
- Interactive map of Gwangju Koryoin Village
- Coordinates: 35.1726°N 126.8062°E
- Country: South Korea
- City: Gwangju
- District: Gwangsan District
- Neighborhood: Wolgok-dong
- First Koryo-saram settlement: 2002
- Incorporated: 2014
- Founder: Shin Jo-ya

Population
  - Estimate (2022): 7,000
- Koryo-saram population
- Website: www.koreancoop.com (in Korean)

Gwangju Koryoin Village (Korean: 광주고려인마을) is an enclave of Koryo-saram (ethnic Koreans of the former Soviet Union) in Wolgok-dong, Gwangsan District, Gwangju, South Korea. Along with Ansan's Ttaetgol Village, it is one of the largest communities of Koryo-saram in the country. It had around 7,000 Koryo-saram residents by 2022.

The village has become a tourist destination. Signs written in Cyrillic script are visible throughout the district. In 2024, there were reportedly around 100 businesses operated by Koryo-saram, with restaurants and stores showcasing their culture. Restaurants serve Koryo-saram cuisine such as morkovcha and Russosphere dishes such as shashlik, plov, and somsa.

== Description ==
It was reported in 2022 that the village has around 40 facilities for Koryo-saram, including a general support collective (고려인마을종합지원센터), kindergarten, alternative school, medical center, radio station, Korean language center, and museum. The village also operates a collective farm to provide additional work opportunities. They acquired the land for the farm for free, from a community credit cooperative called Saemaul.

The community also produces a newspaper. The radio station was established in 2016, and operates out of the third floor of the community collective. One weekly program is on Russian literature, and is run by Vladimir Kim, a former professor of Russian literature at Tashkent State University in Uzbekistan.

The community is actively supported by the local government and surrounding businesses. Some hospitals in Gwangju offer a 30% discount on medical expenses for Koryo-saram in the village.

Since the early 2010s, there has been a street in the district that had, by 2024, over 100 businesses operated by Koryo-saram. The street is dubbed "Koryoin Village Specialty Street" (고려인마을 특화거리), and is actively supported by the city government, which is planning to build additional parking for access to businesses on the street.

== History ==
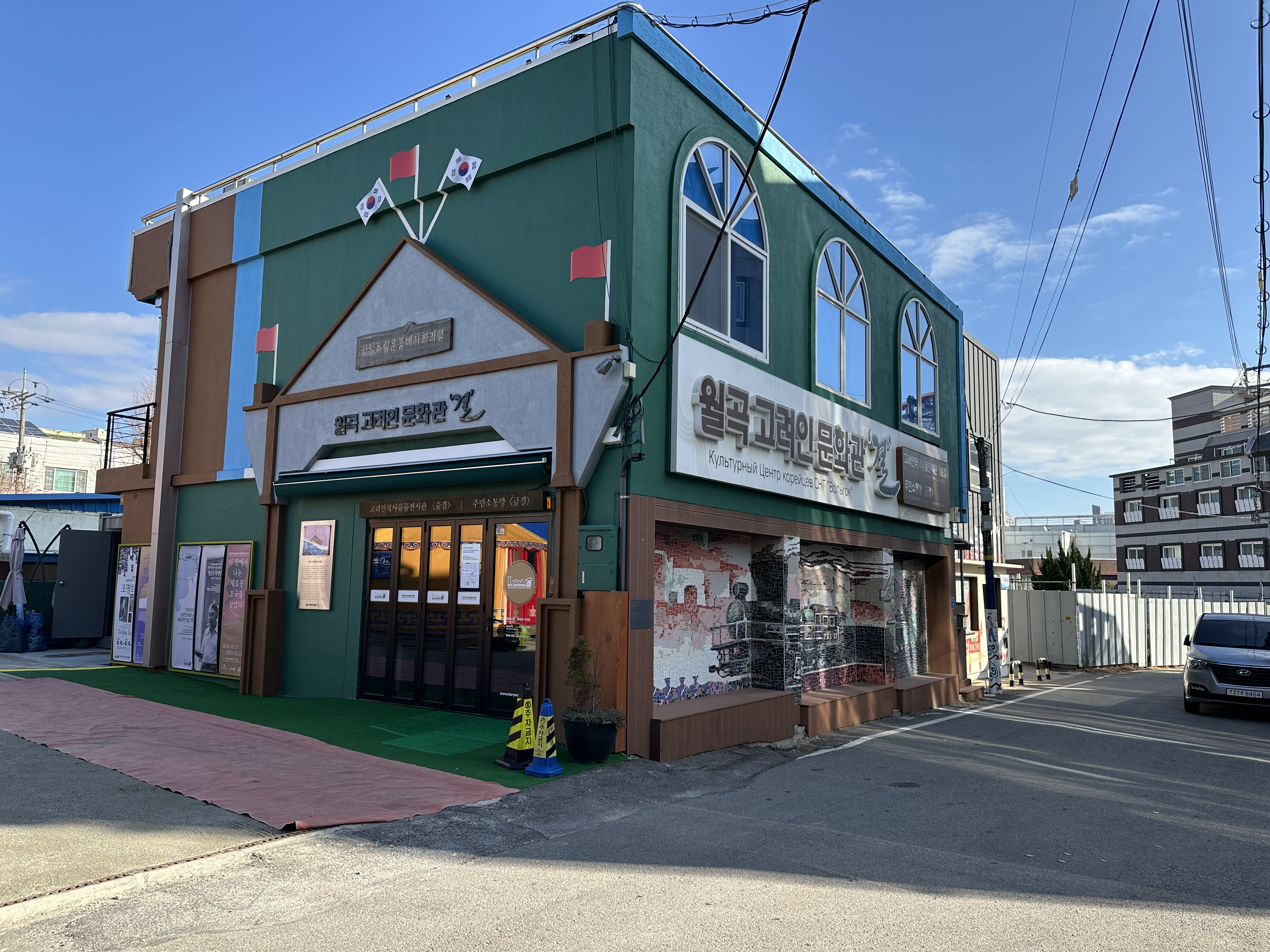
Koryo-saram history museum inside the village (2025)

The community is considered to have been founded by a single person, Shin Jo-ya (신조야). A third-generation Koryo-saram from Uzbekistan, Shin arrived in South Korea in 2001 to visit her daughter, who was married to a South Korean man. She stayed illegally after her travel visa had expired, although she eventually acquired legal residence status in June 2003. She reported that living as an undocumented resident in South Korea was better than living in Uzbekistan. She speaks Korean, but not Uzbek, which contributed to difficulties when she lived there.

Shin moved to the area in 2002 and worked in factories there for several years. She opened a migrant worker assistance center that supported many Koryo-saram workers in the region. The community began with around 20 people, and grew from friends and relatives moving into the area. By 2013, there were several thousand Koryo-saram in the area. This led to the Gwangju government creating legal frameworks to assist the Koryo-saram residents. It became a legally recognized entity in April 2014. Shin opened a charitable collective for the community in 2015, that offers assistance with visa issues, advocacy for worker's rights, and translation.

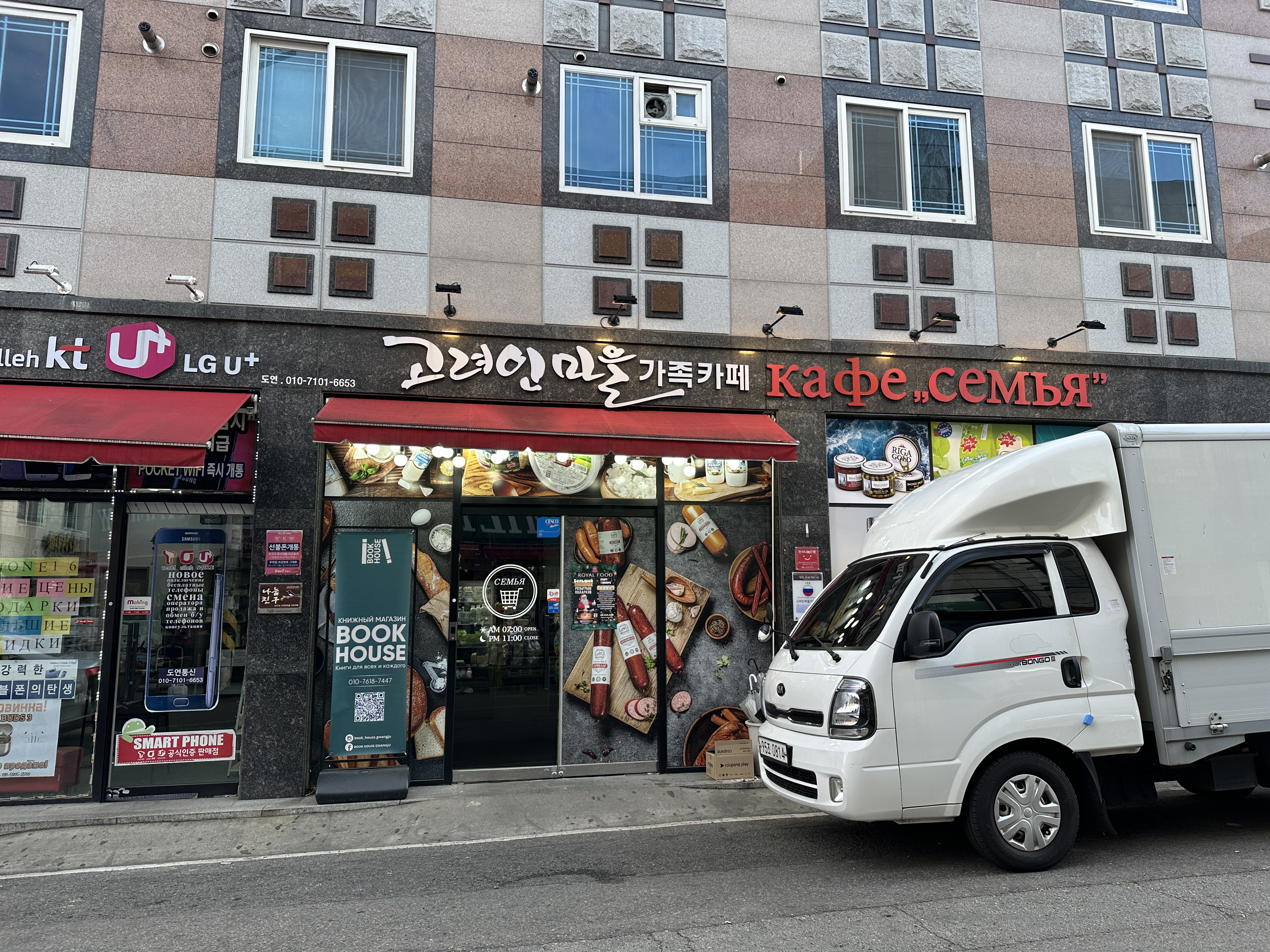
A community-run restaurant (2025)

The area has since become a tourist destination. In collaboration with the Gwangju government, a number of efforts have been made to attract visitors. The city designated 2017 as the "Year of Visiting Koryoin Village".

First-generation residents have encountered difficulty with living in South Korea. They generally work in low-paying, manual labor fields, and are subject to workplace discrimination. Many work on the collective farm or repair houses in rural villages. Language also poses a challenge; while many cannot speak Korean, some who can speak the Koryo-mar dialect, which can be difficult to understand for South Koreans and also identify them as foreigners.

=== Russo-Ukrainian War ===
The 2014 to present Russo-Ukrainian War, as well as the 2022 Russian invasion of Ukraine, have created significant changes in the community. Hundreds of refugees, mostly women and children, arrived in the community, due to the encouragement and financial support of the residents. By December 2022, it was reported that the residents had helped support the arrival of 875 refugees. Around 600 went to the village.

In August 2022, a center for Koryo-saram from Ukraine opened in the district. Residents of the community and other South Korean donors contributed significant money to helping Korean Ukrainians arrive in the area and resettle. They created shelters for the refugees by renovating their buildings. The shelter maintained a requirement that occupants had to vacate the premises as soon as they received their first paycheck, in order to make room for other refugees. Civil rights lawyers and aid workers volunteered at the shelter. In August 2022, it was reported that 400 former shelter residents had moved into the community for the longer term.

Schools in the area were underprepared for the influx of non–Korean speaking students. Around 2016, the area had just two classes of students. Eight more were expected to open by 2023.

Around 2022, the village had around 7,000 Koryo-saram from various countries. It was reported in February 2023 that they temporarily halted efforts to take in more people due to a lack of funds. Many Korean Ukrainians reportedly hope to stay in South Korea for the long term, as their former homes in Ukraine had been completely destroyed.

In February 2024, it was reported that around 30 of the initial refugees had returned to Ukraine, and that a significant majority of the remainees wished to stay in South Korea for the long term. Around 400 of the initial refugees from Ukraine had scattered to other areas of the city's metropolitan area and of South Jeolla in search of work, and that around 450 had remained in Gwangju. Doubt has been expressed that these refugees will be able to stay in South Korea after the stabilization of Ukraine.

== See also ==
- Category:Koryo-saram communities in South Korea
- Koryo-saram in South Korea
- Koreans in Ukraine
- Hometown Village – a government-sponsored return migration community for Sakhalin Koreans
