= Irpin refugee column shelling =

March 2022 incident during the Russian invasion of Ukraine

- Part of the Battle of Irpin
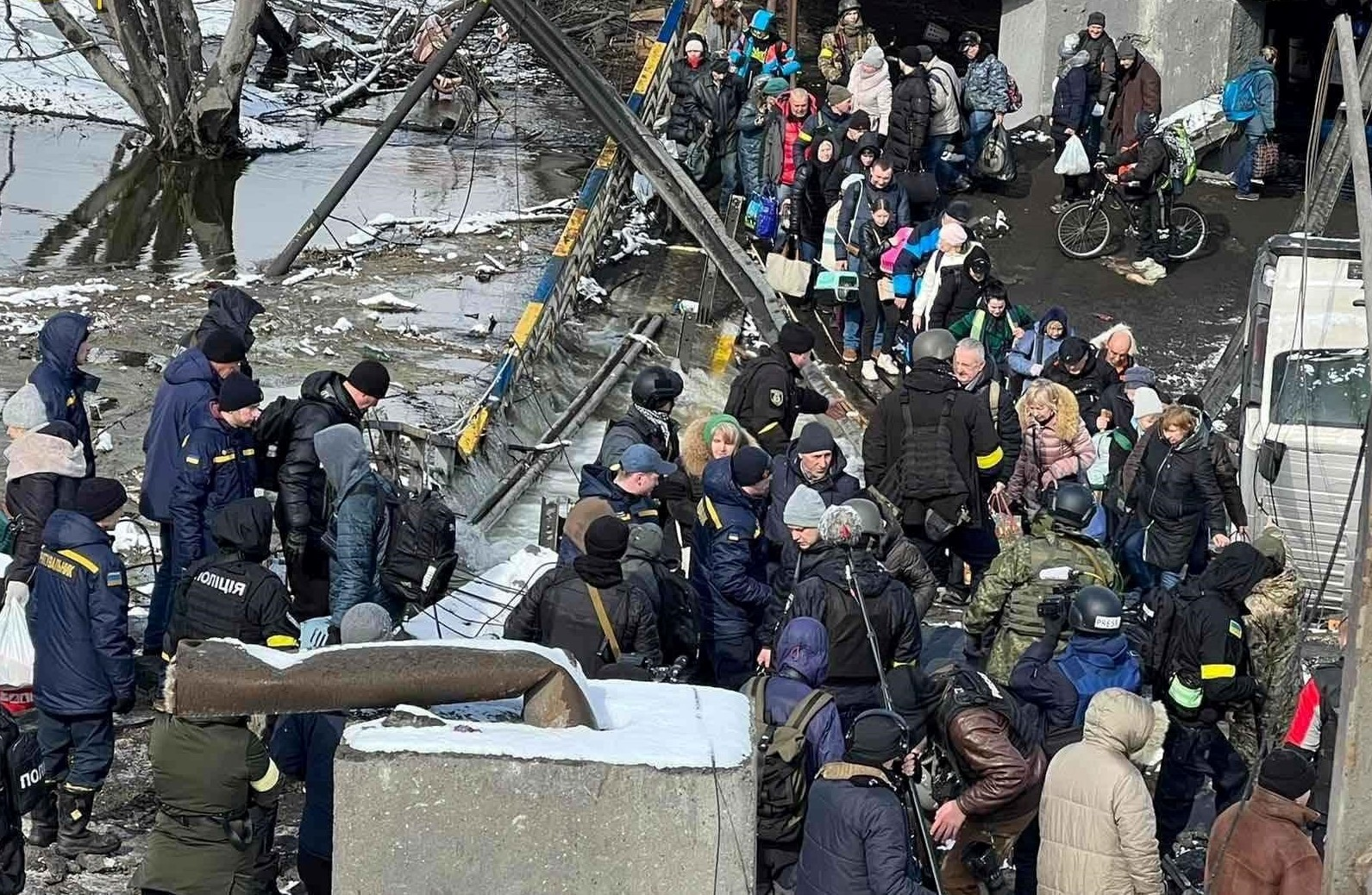
- Refugees fleeing from Russian bombardments over a bridge in Irpin
- Location: Irpin intersection, Ukraine
- Date: March 6, 2022
- Target: Ukrainians
- Attack type: Mortar strikes, explosive projectiles
- Deaths: 8
- Perpetrator: Russian Armed Forces

On 6 March 2022, from 9:30 a.m. until 2 p.m. local time, the Russian Armed Forces repeatedly shelled an intersection in Irpin that hundreds of civilians were using to escape to Kyiv, whilst a Ukrainian artillery position was located nearby. They killed eight Ukrainian civilians. Human Rights Watch alleged the Russian army carried out an unlawful, indiscriminate, and disproportionate attack. The incident was part of an assault on Irpin, during the Russian invasion of Ukraine.

== History ==
On 6 March 2022 there were hundreds of civilians at the intersection on the P30 road, near the St. George's Ukrainian Orthodox Church, just south of a bridge that the Ukrainian army had destroyed to hinder the Russian invasion. The civilians were fleeing the Russian army's advance from Irpin towards Kyiv. In the intersection near the bridge were a dozen Ukrainian soldiers, some helping the civilians carry their luggage and children. The Ukrainian artillery was firing mortar rounds from a position about 180 meters away. No agreements had been reached between the parties about a temporary ceasefire or humanitarian corridor.

Journalists of The New York Times and freelance journalists on the scene report that for several hours the Russian army bombarded the intersection that the civilians were using to flee. The Russians fired explosive projectiles into the area, with projectiles hitting the intersection or the surrounding area every 10 minutes, killing at least eight civilians, as reported by the Ukrainian authorities.

Among the victims were a group of four, including two children, who were killed by a mortar strike.

According to Human Rights Watch, it is possible that the projectiles were "observed" by the Russians, who would then know where they were landing and could easily have adjusted the aim away from the intersection. Instead they engaged in prolonged shelling of the intersection being used by civilians, which indicates "potential recklessness or deliberateness" on their part. The repeated nature of the attacks suggests that Russian forces "violated their obligations under international humanitarian law not to conduct indiscriminate or disproportionate attacks that harm civilians, and failed to take all feasible measures to avoid civilian casualties."

The human rights organisation also stated that the Ukrainian forces "have an obligation to take all feasible precautions to avoid or minimize civilian harm," such as refraining from engaging in combat in populated areas.

== See also ==
- Russian war crimes
- 1999 Grozny refugee convoy shooting
