= Choji-dong =

Neighborhood in Ansan, South Korea

- Hangul: 초지동
- Hanja: 草芝洞
- RR: Choji-dong
- MR: Ch'oji-dong

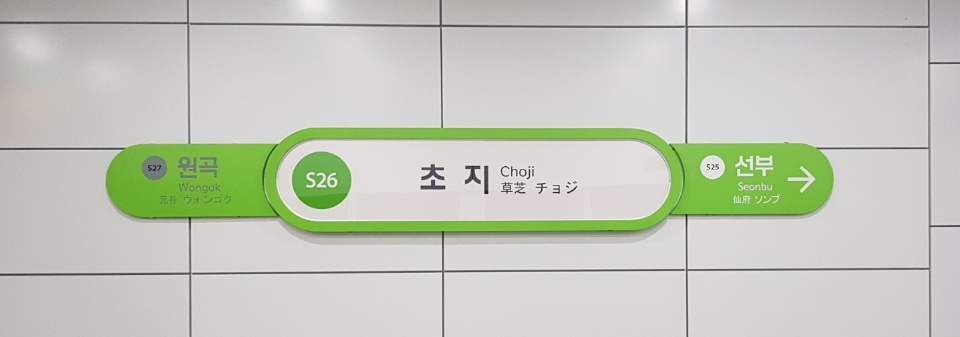
Choji station

Choji-dong (Korean: 초지동) is dong (neighborhood) of Danwon District, Ansan, Gyeonggi Province, South Korea. Located in the center of the city, it is formed as a residential, green, and industrial complex area, and with the creation of Gojan New Town, the population is rapidly increasing, centering on new apartments. Banwol Industrial Complex and Sihwa Industrial Complex, where the largest small and medium-sized enterprise complex in Korea is built, are included in Choji-dong, Korea, and have a large image as an industrial area. Choji-dong is the heart of the national industry with Banwol National Industrial Complex, which houses more than 2,000 small and medium-sized enterprises. In addition to residents in the jurisdiction, there are Hwarang Recreation Area where many people gather to relax and Citizens Market, a traditional market where the 5-day market is active.

== History ==
Choji-dong was a key point on the west coast that overpowered Namyang Bay from the Three Kingdoms period to the Joseon Dynasty, and in the 7th year of King Hyojong's reign (1656), it was moved to Ganghwado Island, and this place was called Choji and Ganghwado Island's was called Choji.

Except for places where fishing flourished earlier, such as Sinchon, old house sites, small Baekjung, large Baekjung, and small Jujeong, most villages were closed and factories were built, and now they thrive as an area where industrial complexes, townhouses, apartments, and houses are harmonized.

During the Joseon period, it was Choji-ri, War-myeon, Ansan-gun, and became Choji-ri, Gunja-myeon, Siheung-gun on March 1, 1914, and then Choji-dong, Ansan-si on January 1, 1986.
