= Seonbu-dong =

Neighbourhood in Ansan, South Korea

- Hangul: 선부동
- Hanja: 仙府洞
- RR: Seonbu-dong
- MR: Sŏnbu-dong

Seonbu-dong (Korean: 선부동) is neighbourhood of Danwon-gu, Ansan, Gyeonggi Province, South Korea. It is officially divided into Seonbu-1-dong, Seonbu-2-dong and Seonbu-3-dong.
