= Gojan-dong, Ansan =

Neighborhood of Ansan, South Korea

Coordinates: 37.3187°N 126.8314°E

- Hangul: 고잔동
- Hanja: 古棧洞
- RR: Gojan-dong
- MR: Kojan-dong

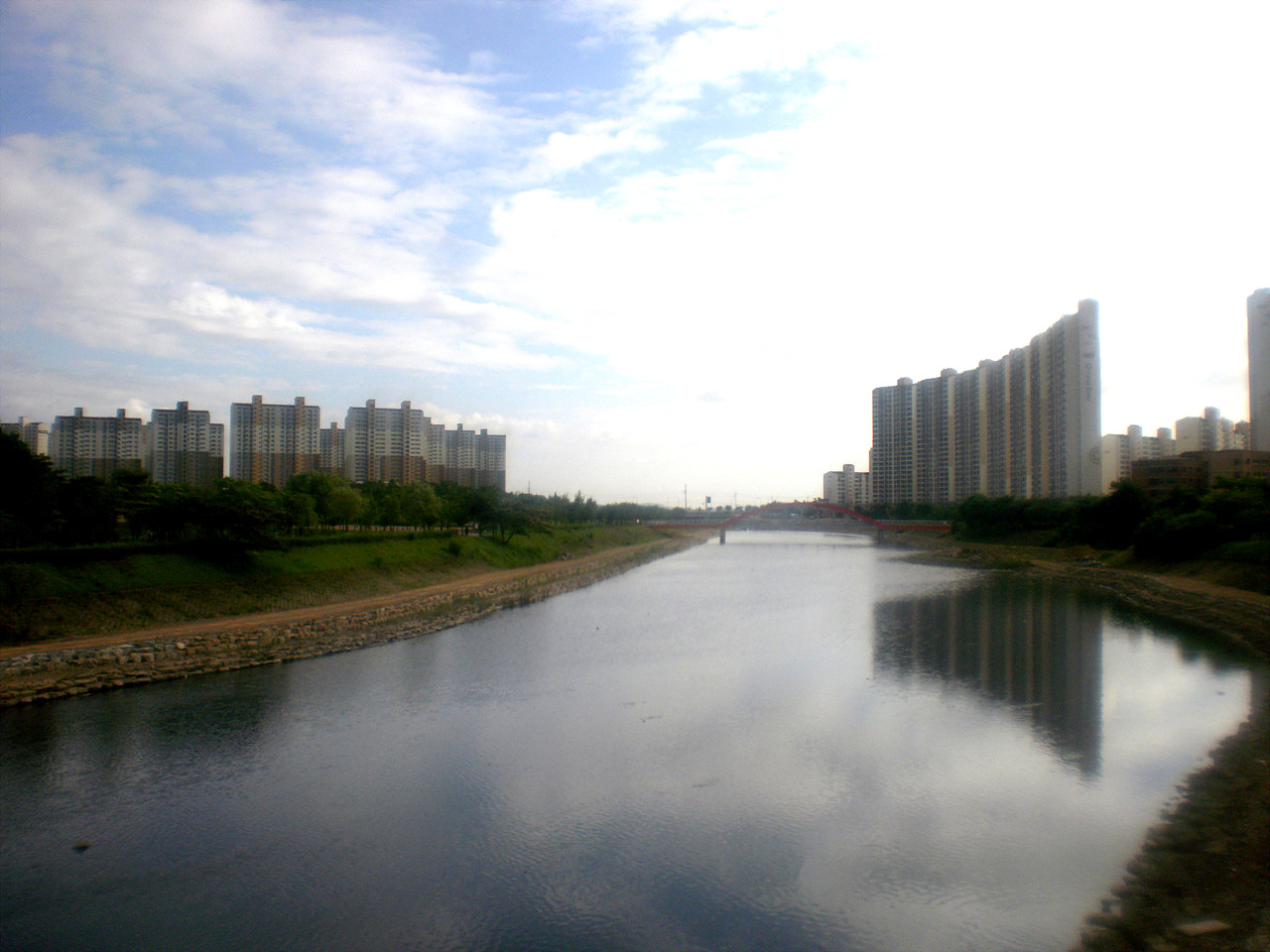
Ansancheon in Gojan-dong

Gojan-dong (Korean: 고잔동) is a dong (neighborhood) of Danwon District, Ansan, Gyeonggi Province, South Korea. It is officially divided into Gojan-1-dong and Gojan-2-dong. It is an important administrative point located in the center of Ansan, and is a densely formed area of institutions at various levels of the city. It is also a multi-family housing, officetel, and town complex complex residential area.

== History ==
In the Joseon period, the place was Ansan Imhwameon Gojan-ri. In 1914, the administrative district was changed to Gojan-ri, Suam-myeon, Siheung-gun. In 1986, it changed to Ansanjung-dong. In 1988, Jungang-dong was divided into Gojan-1, Gojan-2, and Sungpo-dong. Currently, the administrative district is composed of Gojan 1, Gojan 2, and Hosu Dong.

In Jeokgeumgoeul, the following legend is told:

"A long time ago, an old woman lived in this village with her two sons. The old woman gave a prayer to Seonghwangdang, which she had brought to the ridge in front of her house for a year to help her two sons do well, and when the old monk appeared in her dream and dug the ground as told, gold came out."

Since then, it is said that this village began to be called Jeokgeum, and after that, numerous people visited the mountain in the north of the village and dug up to mine gold.
