= Wongok-dong =

Neighbourhood of Ansan, South Korea

- Hangul: 원곡동
- Hanja: 元谷洞
- RR: Wongok-dong
- MR: Wŏn'gok-tong

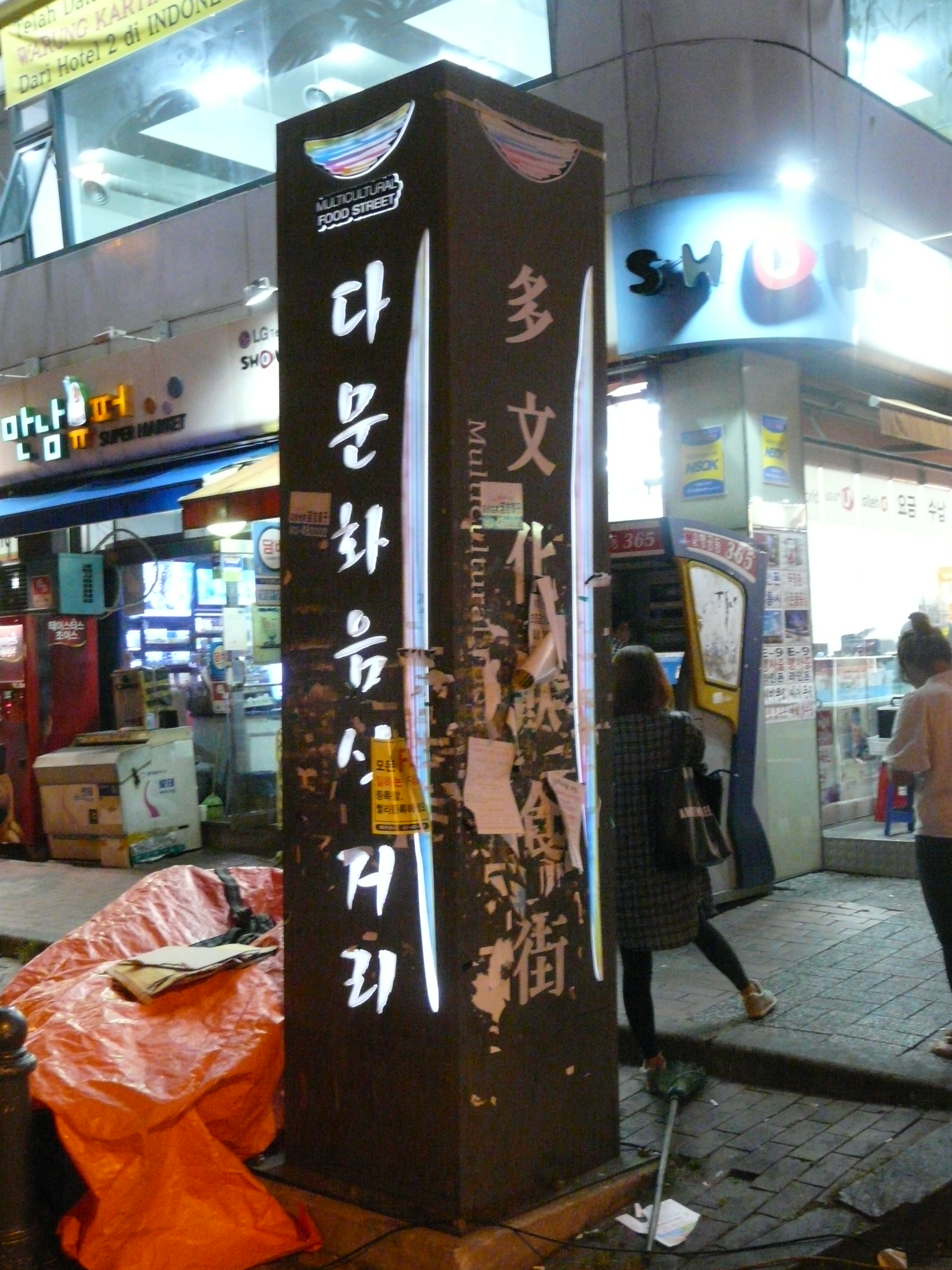
Wongok-dong street

Wongok-dong (Korean: 원곡동) is neighbourhood of Danwon-gu, Ansan, Gyeonggi Province, South Korea. It is officially divided into Wongok-1-dong, Wongok-2-dong and Wongok-bondong. The multi cultural special zone (town) is located in Wongok-dong. In multi culture town 70% of the people are foreign and 30% of the people are Korean. Wongok-dong has the widest forest area of 34km. The farmland is 18.8km, which is small compared to the total area.

Wongok Station was located in Wongok-dong as a stopover for Suin Line. The Suin Line was a narrow-gauge railway that operated Suwon Station in Paldal-gu, Suwon-si, Gyeonggi-do, and Incheon Port in Jung-gu, Incheon-si in 1937. Then, in November 1973, Incheon Port (South Incheon) Station and Yonghyeon Station were closed, and Songdo, Incheon, became the final stations.

Freight transportation was suspended from 1977, and the number of operations decreased to three times a day from 1983, but the Suin Line service was suspended as of January 1, 1996. At that time, Wongok Station and Gojan Station in Ansan, where Suin Line passes, had more passenger traffic than cargo traffic. This is because all stations and surrounding areas on the Suin Line were the only means of transportation to travel between Suwon and Incheon at the shortest distance, with cars and route buses insufficient.

The current Ansan Station was created in 1988 when the Ansan Line, a metropolitan subway line, was opened. Wongok Station was installed between Ansan Station and Singil Oncheon Station, where trains going up and down were crossing, and after Ansan Station was built, it was closed and demolished.

Meanwhile, small factories are located nearby at Wongok Station on the Suin Line, and there are two old trees at the entrance and a sign indicating that it was Wongok Station in the past.

In addition to the subway with Seoul, Wongok-dong has various city and county roads in addition to Pyeongtaek Siheung Expressway (the 2nd West Coast Expressway), Seoul-Ansan Expressway, and National Road No. 42.

== Education ==
Ansan Seo Elementary School a.k.a. Ansan West Elementary School (안산서초등학교) in Wongok-dong has a multicultural program with students from other countries, a rarity in South Korean education.
