= Pavlo Lee =

Ukrainian actor and soldier (1988–2022)

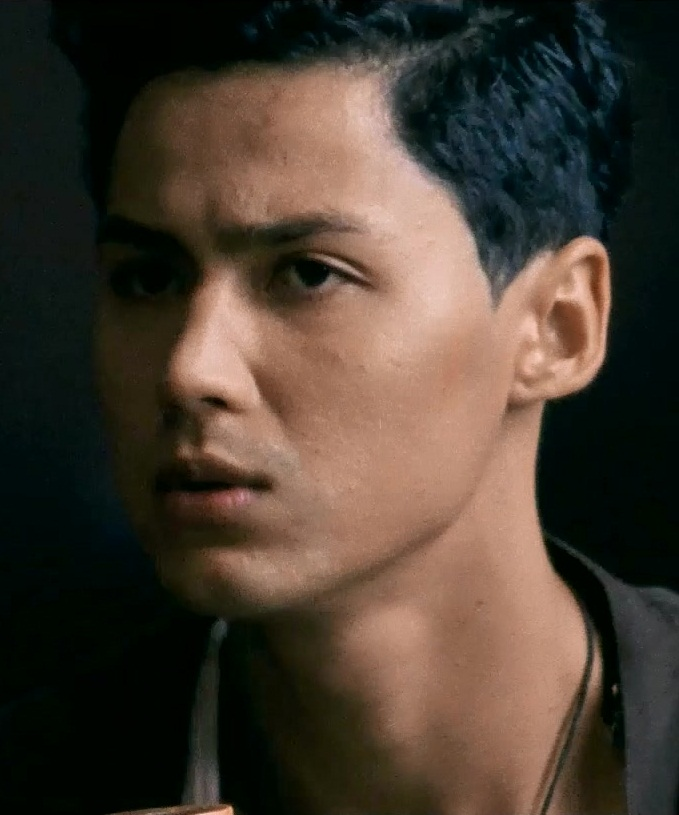
- Born: Павло Романович Лі; Pavlo Romanovych Li; 10 July 1988; Yevpatoria, Crimean Oblast, Ukrainian SSR, USSR
- Died: 6 March 2022 (aged 33); Irpin, Kyiv Oblast, Ukraine
- Cause of death: Killed in action
- Occupation: Actor
- Years active: 2003–2022

Pavlo 'Pasha' Romanovych Lee (Ukrainian: Павло «Паша» Романович Лі; 10 July 1988 – 6 March 2022) was a Ukrainian actor and television presenter.

He enlisted immediately after the Russian invasion of Ukraine, and was killed in the battle of Irpin.

== Early life ==
Lee was born in Yevpatoria, Crimea, to a Koryo-saram father and a Ukrainian mother. He also went by a variant spelling of his surname, Li.

== Career ==
Lee was a television host for the Dom Channel. He had worked in theatre and a number of commercials, and was known for starring in the films Tini nezabutykh predkiv. Tayemnytsi molfara (2013), Shtolnya (2006), Pravilo boya (2017), Zustrich odnoklasnykiv (2019), and the voice dubbing of the popular English-language films The Lion King, Yesterday, BIOS and The Hobbit into Ukrainian; he was also the dubbing voice of television characters such as Eric Cartman in South Park, Steve Smith in American Dad!, Glenn Quagmire in Family Guy and Psyduck in Detective Pikachu. Most recently, he starred in the TV series Provincial (2021).

== Filmography ==
- 2003 – One for All
- 2006 – Bottom asleep – Dan
- 2008 – Thanks for Everything You've Been Thanking Me-3
- 2012 – Common Law
- 2013 – The Legacy of Forgotten Ancestors – Vova
- 2016 – Selfie Party – Guardian
- 2017 – Fighting Rule – Diesel
- 2017 – Specifics
- 2019 – Meeting of Classmates – Kostya
- 2022 – Mirny-21 (in the works)

== Death ==
Lee enlisted in the Territorial Defense Forces of Ukraine on the first day of the Russian invasion. During his time fighting, he had posted several times to his Instagram account discussing the conditions and Ukrainian strength.

He was killed by Russian shelling in the battle of Irpin on 6 March, and his death was announced by the Odesa International Film Festival. He was buried on 18 March in Vorokhta, Ivano-Frankivsk Oblast, where his mother still lives.
