= Battle of Irpin =

Battle in the Russian invasion of Ukraine

- Part of the northern front of the 2022 Russian invasion of Ukraine
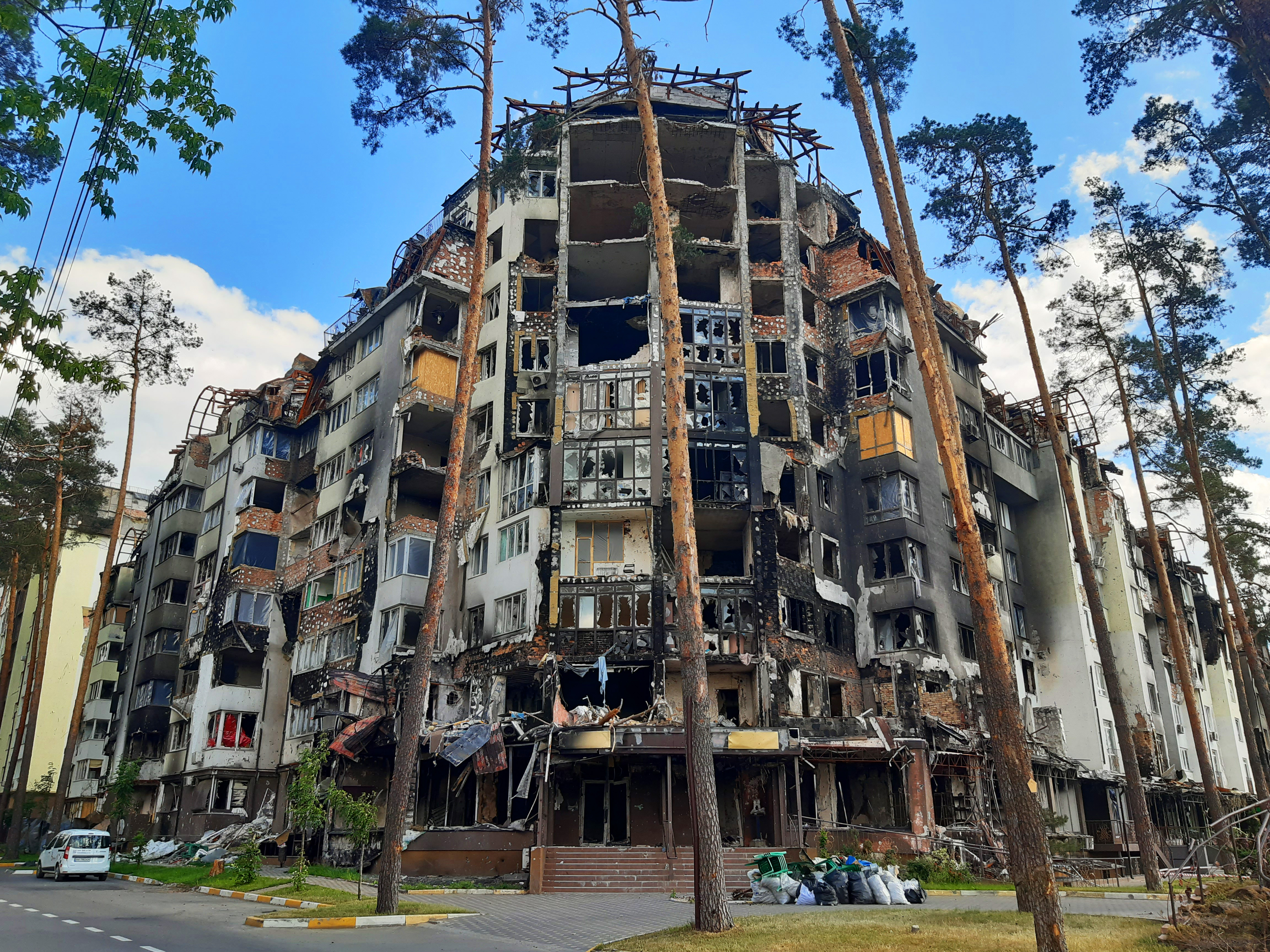
Date	27 February – 9 March 2022 (1 week and 3 days)
Location	Irpin, Ukraine
Result	Ukrainian victory

Belligerents
Russia	Ukraine

Commanders and leaders
Unknown	Oleksiy Kuleba; Oleksandr Markushyn

Units involved
Russian Armed Forces; Russian Airborne Forces; Russian Ground Forces; Russian Air Force; 18th ShAP; National Guard of Russia; SOBR; OMON	Armed Forces of Ukraine; Ukrainian Ground Forces; Territorial Defense Forces; International Legion; Ukrainian Air Force; Special Tasks Patrol Police; Safari Regiment

Strength
30,000 troops (including Moshchun)	3,000 troops (including Moshchun)

Casualties and losses
83+ soldiers killed 1 armored personnel carrier destroyed 200+ vehicles destroyed 1 Su-25 shot down 2 Su-30s shot down	Per Ukraine: ~50 soldiers killed
- Per Ukraine: 290 civilians killed

As part of the Russian offensive on Kyiv during the Russian invasion of Ukraine, a battle took place for control of the city of Irpin. The combatants were elements of the Russian Armed Forces and Ukrainian Ground Forces. By 28 March 2022, Ukrainian forces recaptured the city.

The battle was part of a larger operation to encircle Kyiv, the capital city of Ukraine. The Ukrainian forces resisted the Russian advance in the capital's western suburbs of Irpin, Bucha, and Hostomel. The battle was marked by fierce urban fighting. Nearly 70% of the city was heavily damaged or destroyed as a result.

== Prelude ==
On 25 February, Russian forces advanced on the suburb of Hostomel and its airport from the northwest after partially breaking through Ukrainian defenses at Ivankiv, capturing the airport and establishing a foothold in the town. Though there was still ongoing Ukrainian resistance in Hostomel, Russian forces began to advance south to capture the neighboring cities of Irpin and Bucha, with the goal of encircling Kyiv.

Later that day, a Russian column was defeated by Ukrainian forces near Irpin. The 70th Support Brigade blew up a bridge to block the passage of a Russian convoy, following which its barrier platoon was attacked by Russian forces, killing two personnel. On 26 February, residents of Irpin reported that Russian saboteurs were disguising themselves as Ukrainian soldiers.

== Battle ==
=== February ===
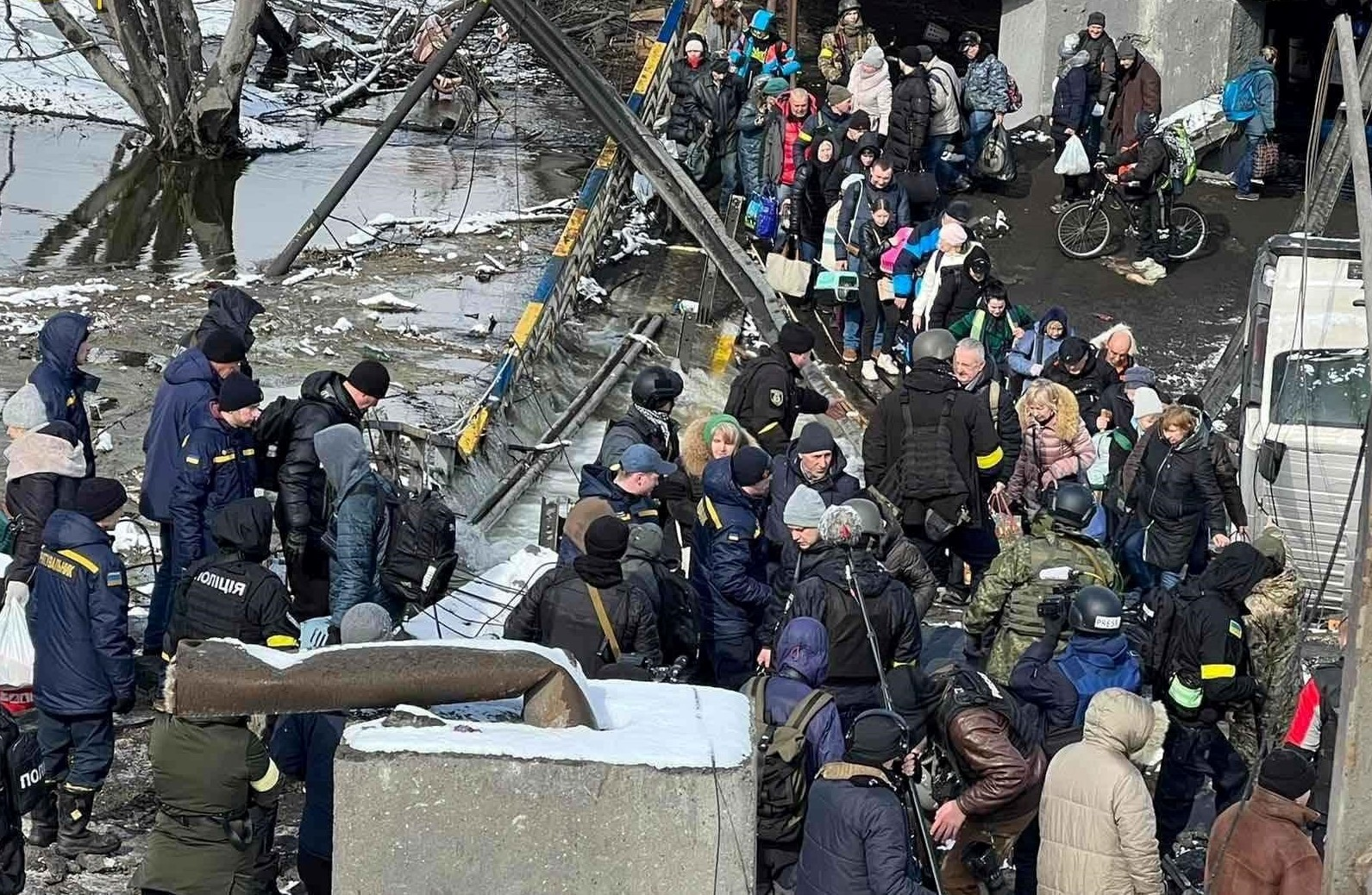
A transfer of civilians from Irpin to Kyiv due to Russian attacks.

On 25 February, due to a lack of communications with the main invasion command, a convoy of OMON and SOBR units from Kemerovo Oblast accidentally separated from the invasion forces and ended up charging at Kyiv by themselves. The convoy was ambushed at a bridge over the Irpin River, and the unarmored and under-equipped units were completely destroyed. Reportedly, of the 80 soldiers in the convoy, only 3 wounded men survived.

On 27 February, Ukrainian forces reported that Russian Ground Forces had advanced into Bucha, breaking through the city and advancing towards Irpin. A tank battle ensued inside the city, while Ukrainian infantry engaged Russian paratroopers. Oleksandr Markushyn, the mayor of Irpin, stated that the Russian forces were attempting to break through the city but were being repulsed by Ukrainian Ground Forces and Territorial Defense Forces, with Ukrainian tank reinforcements coming from Bucha. Intense fighting occurred at the Giraffe mall between Bucha and Irpin. Videos posted by Ukrainian soldiers showed a destroyed Russian armored personnel carrier and at least six dead Russian soldiers.

The Ukrainian forces used rockets, artillery, and airstrikes to halt the Russian advance, and destroyed a bridge connecting Bucha and Irpin.

On 28 February 2022, Ukrainian official Oleksiy Arestovych stated that Ukrainian forces attacked Russian forces on Highway M06 in the morning and that more than 200 Russian vehicles were destroyed or damaged by the afternoon.

=== March ===
==== 1–5 March 2022 ====
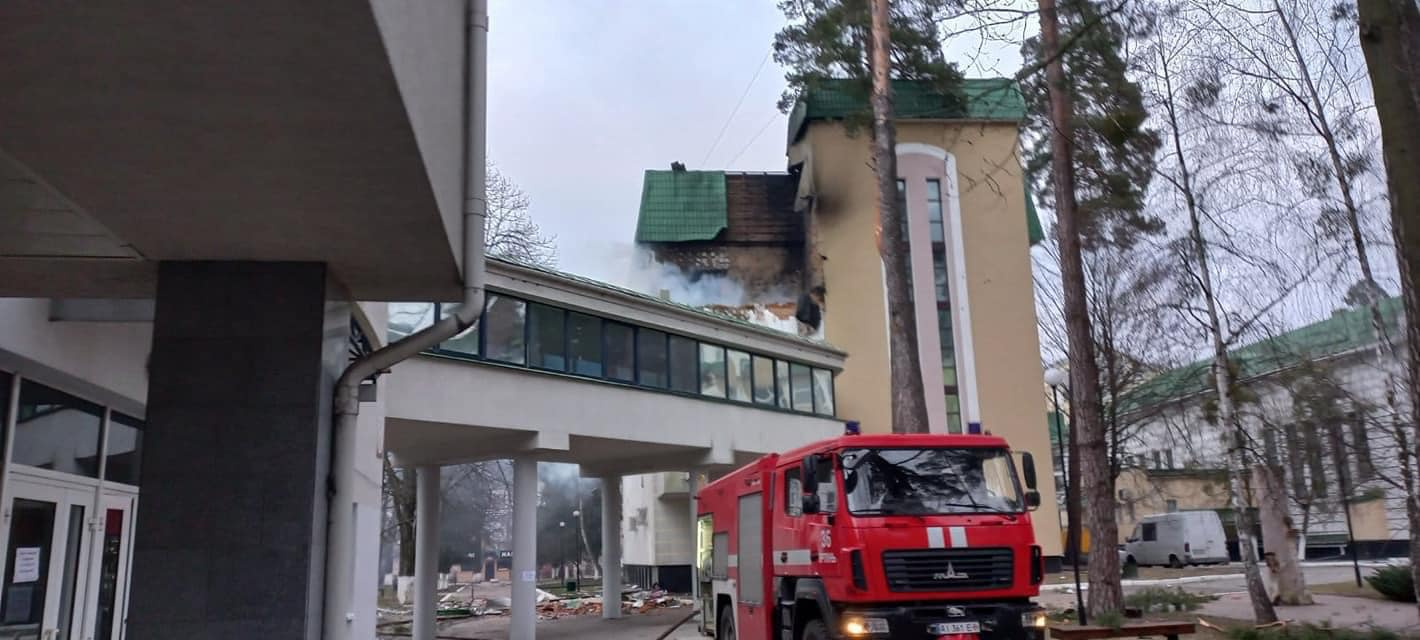
The University of the State Tax Service of Ukraine in Irpin damaged by Russian shelling, 4 March

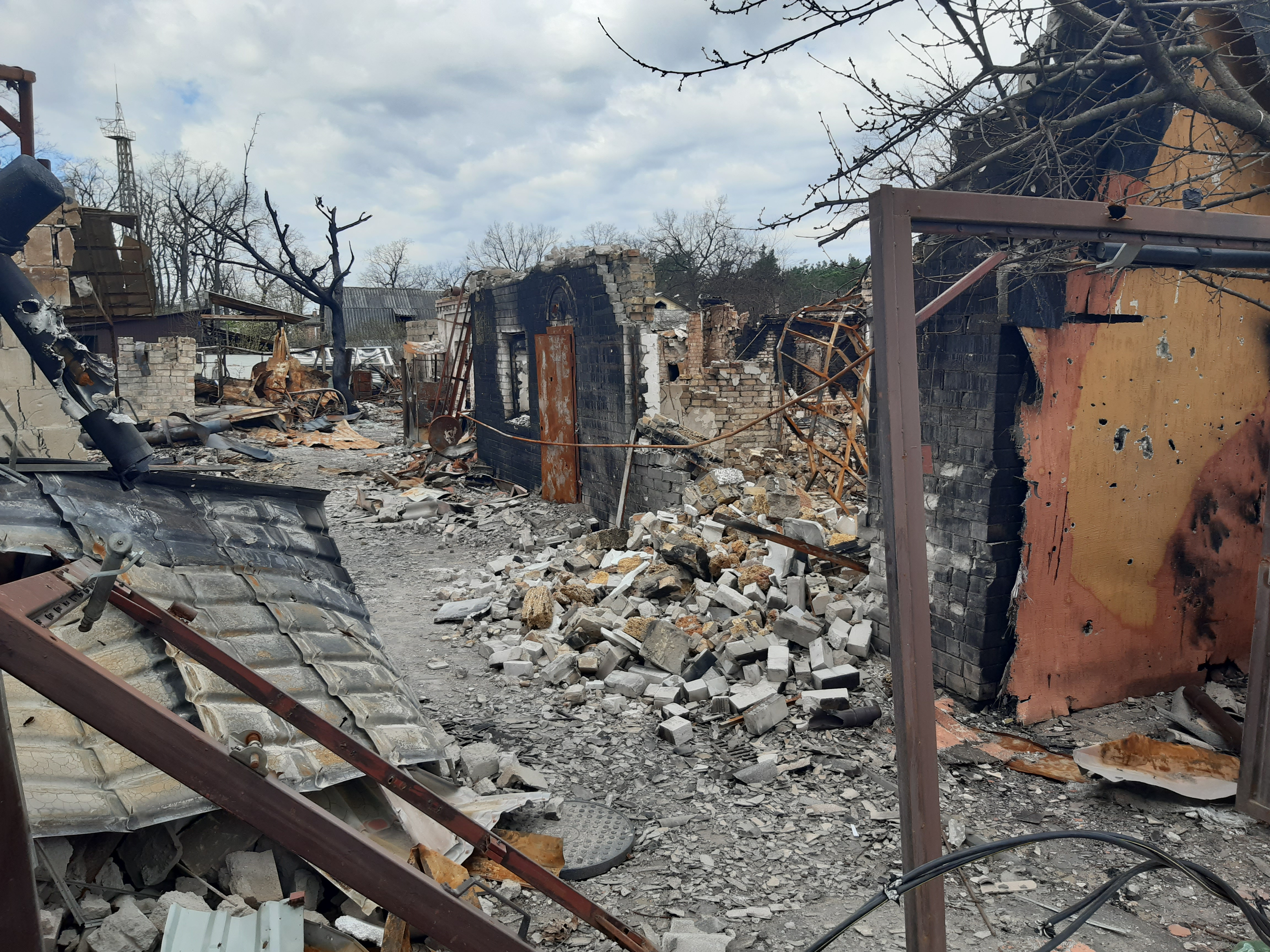
Irpin after Russian invasion

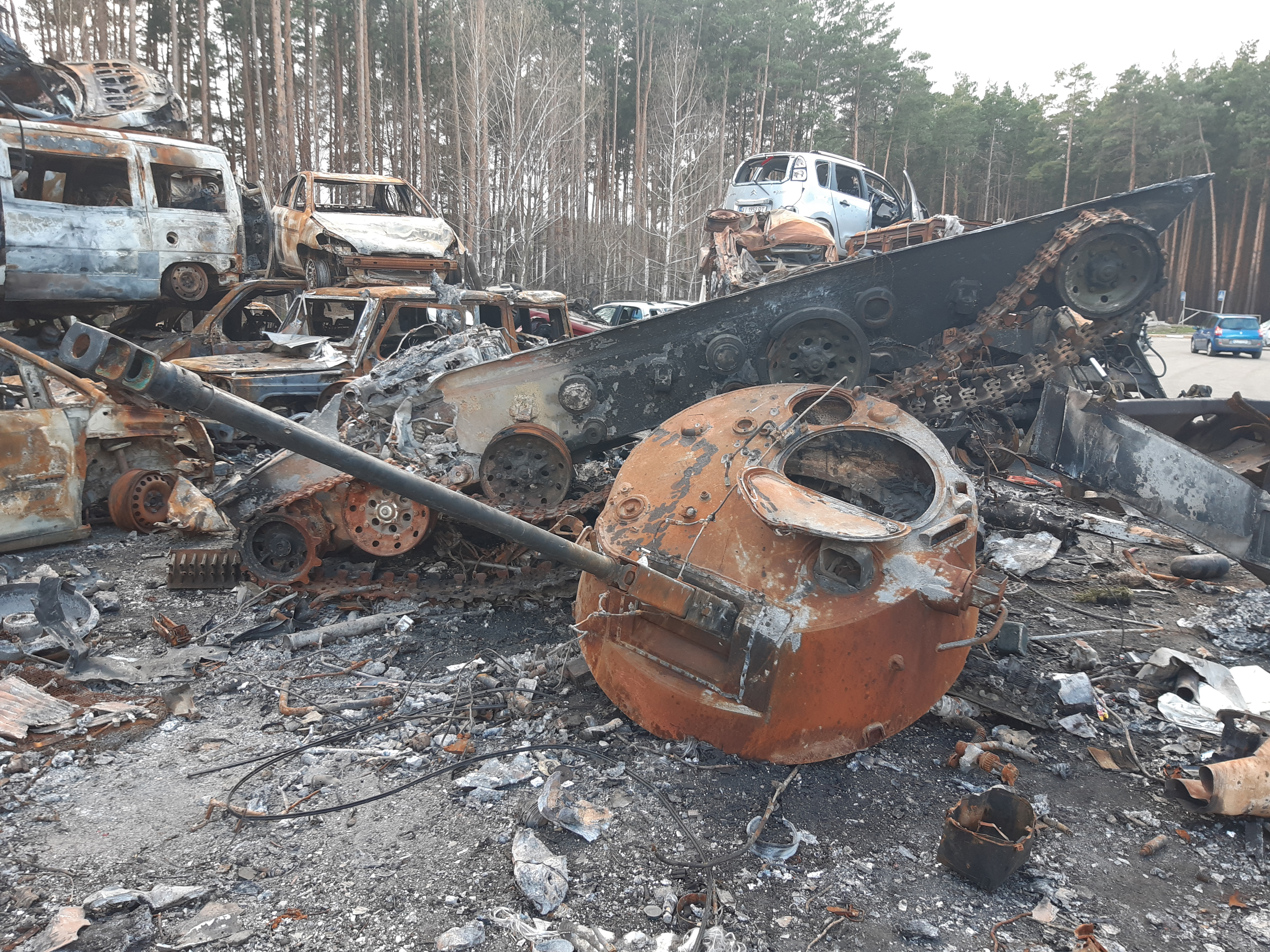
Vehicle graveyard in Irpin

On 2 March 2022, two Russian Sukhoi Su-25s conducted airstrikes in Irpin. Two missiles struck a residential building, killing a child and injuring a woman. One of the Su-25s was shot down by Ukrainian forces. The jet was identified to be part of the Russian 18th Guards Assault Aviation Regiment.

Ukrainian military officials reported that Russian forces had begun to lose momentum, taking significant casualties and being stopped at "unfavorable borders."

On 3 March 2022, the Kyiv Oblast State Administration announced that the Ukrainian government was sending humanitarian aid to Bucha and Irpin, as well as announcing evacuations in both cities. More than 1,500 women and children were reported to have evacuated by train, while 250 were evacuated by bus. However, Ukrainian officials reported that the evacuations were complicated as some railway tracks had been destroyed during fighting.

Valerii Zaluzhnyi, the Commander-in-Chief of the Armed Forces of Ukraine, announced that a Russian Sukhoi Su-30 fighter jet was shot down over Irpin by Ukrainian air defenses on 3 March.

On 5 March 2022, Ukrainian forces began to evacuate civilians from Irpin towards Kyiv on foot, though a destroyed bridge complicated efforts.

==== 6–10 March 2022 ====
On 6 March 2022, Russian forces captured part of Irpin. In the morning, Oleksiy Kuleba, the city's Ukrainian military commander, stated that many evacuation routes out of the city were unsafe. During a civilian evacuation later that day, 8 civilians, including 2 children, were killed when Russian forces shelled the evacuation road by Russian mortar units. A Ukrainian artillery position was located nearby.

According to Human Rights Watch, the Russian shelling may have violated their obligations under international humanitarian law. The organization also stated that Ukraine similarly had an obligation to prevent civilian casualties by not operating military actions in civilian areas. Ukrainian soldier Pavlo Lee, an actor who had joined the Territorial Defense Forces, was later killed by Russian shelling.

On 8 March, Markushyn, who was commanding part of the Ukrainian forces in the city, stated that Russian forces demanded him to surrender the city, which he rejected, saying, "Irpin can't be bought, Irpin fights."

On 9 March 2022, Russian troops were seen patrolling streets in Irpin. Ukrainian forces then conducted a large-scale evacuation across Kyiv Oblast, including in Irpin. Up to 20,000 civilians were evacuated in Kyiv Oblast. Later, the Kyiv Oblast State Administration stated that fighting in Irpin continued during the night.

== Aftermath ==
On 13 March, Russian forces at a checkpoint shot at a car carrying foreign journalists, killing American journalist Brent Renaud and injuring two other journalists. Renaud was carrying press credentials issued by The New York Times, though he had not worked for the publication since 2015.

On 14 March, Mykhailyna Skoryk-Shkarivska, a member of Irpin City Council, stated that half of Irpin was occupied by Russian forces.

On 17 March, the Irpin Central House of Culture was nearly destroyed by Russian artillery. The facade remained standing, marked by the bullets, but the entire roof was destroyed as well as most of the interior.

On 23 March, Markushyn claimed that Ukrainian forces were in control of 80 percent of the city, while France 24 reported Ukrainian forces on the ground acknowledged that Russia controlled half of the city.

On 28 March, Markushyn claimed on social media that Irpin had been recaptured by Ukrainian forces. After initial uncertainty, Reuters confirmed the city was under Ukrainian control on 30 March, with CNN also confirming Ukrainian control of the city on 31 March.

== See also ==
- Irpin refugee column shelling
