= Wa-dong, Ansan =

Wa-dong
- Neighbourhood
- Interactive map of Wa-dong
- Country: South Korea
- Province: Gyeonggi Province
- City: Ansan
- District: Danwon-gu
- Time zone: UTC+9 (Korea Standard Time)
- Website: Official Website (in Korean)

Korean name
- Hangul: 와동
- Hanja: 瓦洞
- RR: Wa-dong
- MR: Wa-dong

Wa-dong (Korean: 와동) is a neighbourhood of Danwon-gu, Ansan, Gyeonggi Province, South Korea. It is located in the Gwangdeoksan Mountain region, a well-known tourist attraction in Ansan. Wa-dong features various sports facilities, including a sports park, a driver's license test site, a public cemetery, and exclusive soccer, badminton, and basketball courts. The Hwajeongcheon Stream flows to the east, while an undeveloped mountain divides the area, affecting residential connectivity.

== Demographics and Housing ==
Wa-dong primarily consists of multi-family and single-family households, accounting for over 90% of the housing type. Approximately 80% of the residents are tenants, with a significant portion being low-income families. The area faces challenges such as stagnating commercial activity, with nine distribution stores struggling due to their small size. Redevelopment initiatives are urgently needed to revitalize the region.

== History ==
During the Joseon Dynasty, Wa-dong was known as Wasan-ri and Wah-ri, part of Inhwa-myeon, Ansan-gun. On March 1, 1914, it was renamed Wari and became part of Suam-myeon, Siheung-gun. The name 'Wa-dong' originated from 'Wagol,' referring to an area where tiles were baked. However, due to a flood-induced collapse of the western part of Gwangdeoksan Mountain during the mid-Joseon period, natural villages in the area were abandoned. Later, new town development led to the disappearance of many traditional settlements such as Gajagol, Dwitgol, Dongjak-ri, Saemal, Ansil, Wadugi, and Keungogae Pass.
