= Waste management in South Korea =

Waste management hierarchy adopted in South Korea

Waste management in South Korea involves waste generation reduction and ensuring maximum recycling of the waste. This includes the appropriate treatment, transport, and disposal of the collected waste. South Korea's Waste Management Law was established in 1986, replacing the Environmental Protection Law (1963) and the Filth and Cleaning Law (1973). This new law aimed to reduce general waste under the waste hierarchy (or three 'R's) in South Korea. This Waste Management Law imposed a volume-based waste fee system, effective for waste produced by both household and industrial activities (or municipal solid waste).

The Waste Management Law began the regulation of systematic waste streams through basic principles in waste management practices, from reduction to disposal of waste. This law also encouraged recycling and resource conservation through a deposit-refund system and a landfill post-closure management system.

== Waste management ==
=== Solid waste management ===
The Seoul Metropolitan Government (SMG) adapted the national policy on waste management to meet demands for an improved waste disposal system in the 1990s. In order to satisfy the public, Seoul concentrated its waste management policy on waste reduction and utilisation. Originally, solid waste was not an environmental concern in South Korea. There was no concern for environmental hazards with amount of solid waste being generated and dumped in

The South Korean government only changed an amount of waste disposal services for household waste disposal despite the large amount being generated. This was significant during the Korean economic boom which created an increase in the production of municipal solid waste. Between 1970 and 1990, the amount of municipal solid waste generated grew from 12,000 tons to 84,000 tons per day. This led to the rise of waste disposal issues in South Korea. The low recycling rate and increased solid waste generation contributed greatly to environmental pollution. As landfills were heavily relied on, the ground and water were polluted. Air quality was also affected as landfills contributed to hazardous gas emissions with unpredicted fires.

=== Water management ===
==== Water pollution ====
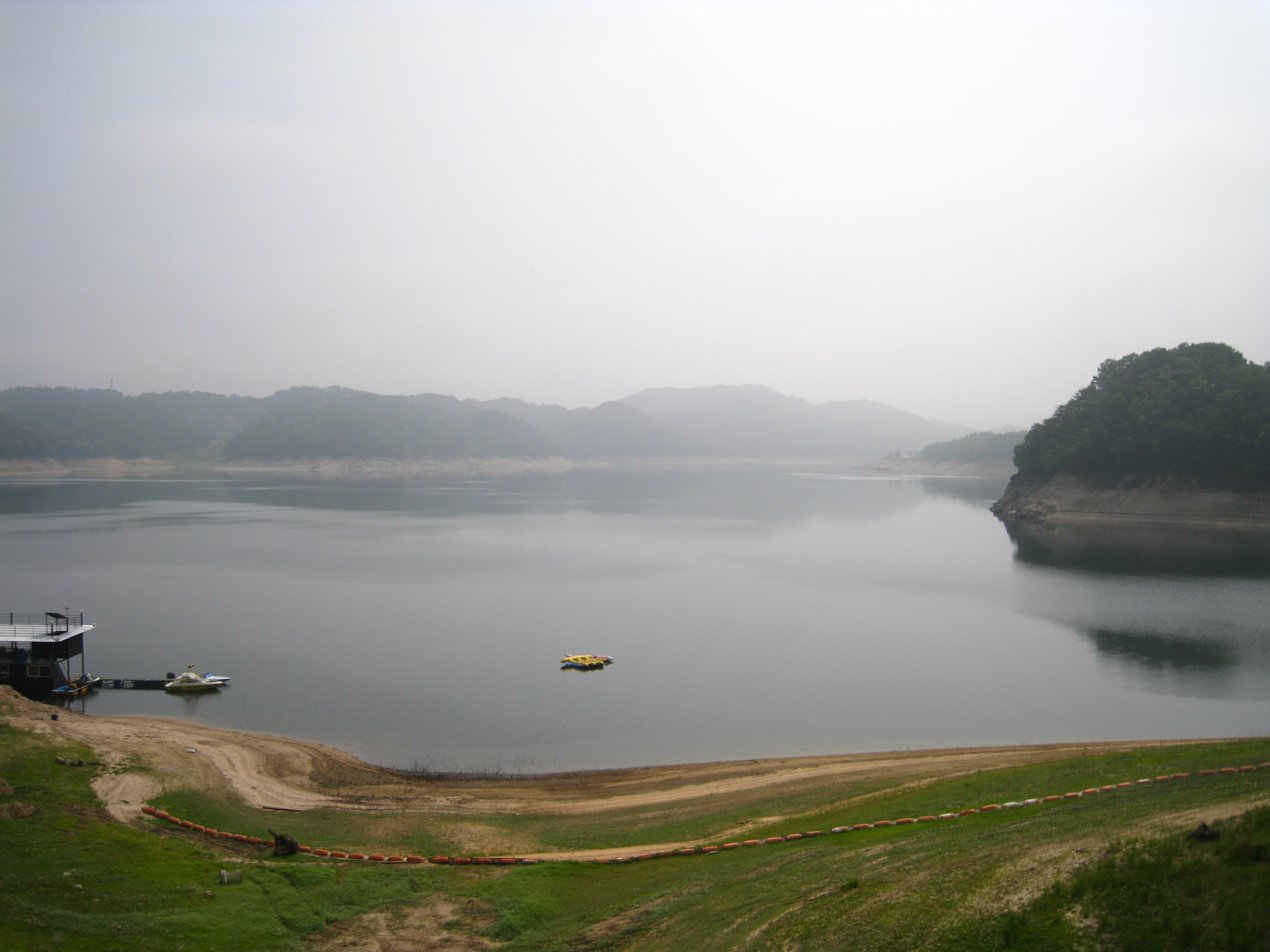
The Nakdong River in South Korea

The Nakdong river is one of the major streams in South Korea, a main drinking source in the Gyeongsang province. Over the past decades, population growth and industrialisation along the Nakdong river has caused pollution of the stream. Industrial waste and sewage, along with urban and agricultural drainage, led to the deterioration of the river.

On March 1, 2008, a chemical factory explosion caused a phenol leak into the Nakdong river. The incident caused toxic substances to leak, leading to major health concerns for the public. Tests also found that formaldehyde also leaked into the river, but concluded that the harmful substances were diluted as the amount water discharged was increased. This is the second time the river has been contaminated by phenol.

In 1991, a phenol leak was the result of the bursting of an underground pipe, leaking pure phenol into the river. This disastrous leak rendered the water undrinkable. South Korea was previously careless with its dumping of waste into the water and air, and The Korea Times also discovered the illegal dumping of non-toxic waste along Nakdong river by 343 factories. Water quality quickly became a priority, and water quality has slowly improved with the installation of water treatment plants.

==== Water treatment ====
Arisu's logo designed with a water drop

Arisu is a water treatment plant found in Seoul. It is positioned as a safe tap water supply for the citizens of Seoul. Arisu sources its water from the Han River, and it goes through several water tests to ensure drinkable water quality as recommended by the World Health Organization (WHO). Substances tested for include chlorine, iron, and copper. Arisu also manages water flow rate systematically, and controls water quality in purification centres. Aside from that, the Seoul Metropolitan Government operates multiple water treatment plants and Sewage Treatment Centres to ensure improvement of water quality.

=== Volume-based waste fee system ===
The volume-based waste fee system (VBWF) was implemented in 1995 by the Korean government. This was made in an attempt to reduce waste generation and encourage recycling amongst its citizens. Municipal waste is collected in synthetic bags, and recyclables are separated and sorted in recycling bins. All disposals, with an exception of recyclables, bulky items, and coal briquettes, are disposed according to the VBWF system. Items are measured with different volume sized bags, and citizens are then charged respectively.

A decade after the introduction and implementation of the VBWF system, waste generation rates were reduced, and recycling rates improved dramatically. The public's awareness for the environment increased and technologies for recycling improved. Decomposable bags were introduced, and excessive packaging of products was also reduced. Refillable products are now preferred to reduce the generation of waste. The VBWF system increased Korean citizens' willingness to recycle, leading to a decreased burden on incineration or landfills.

== Recycling ==
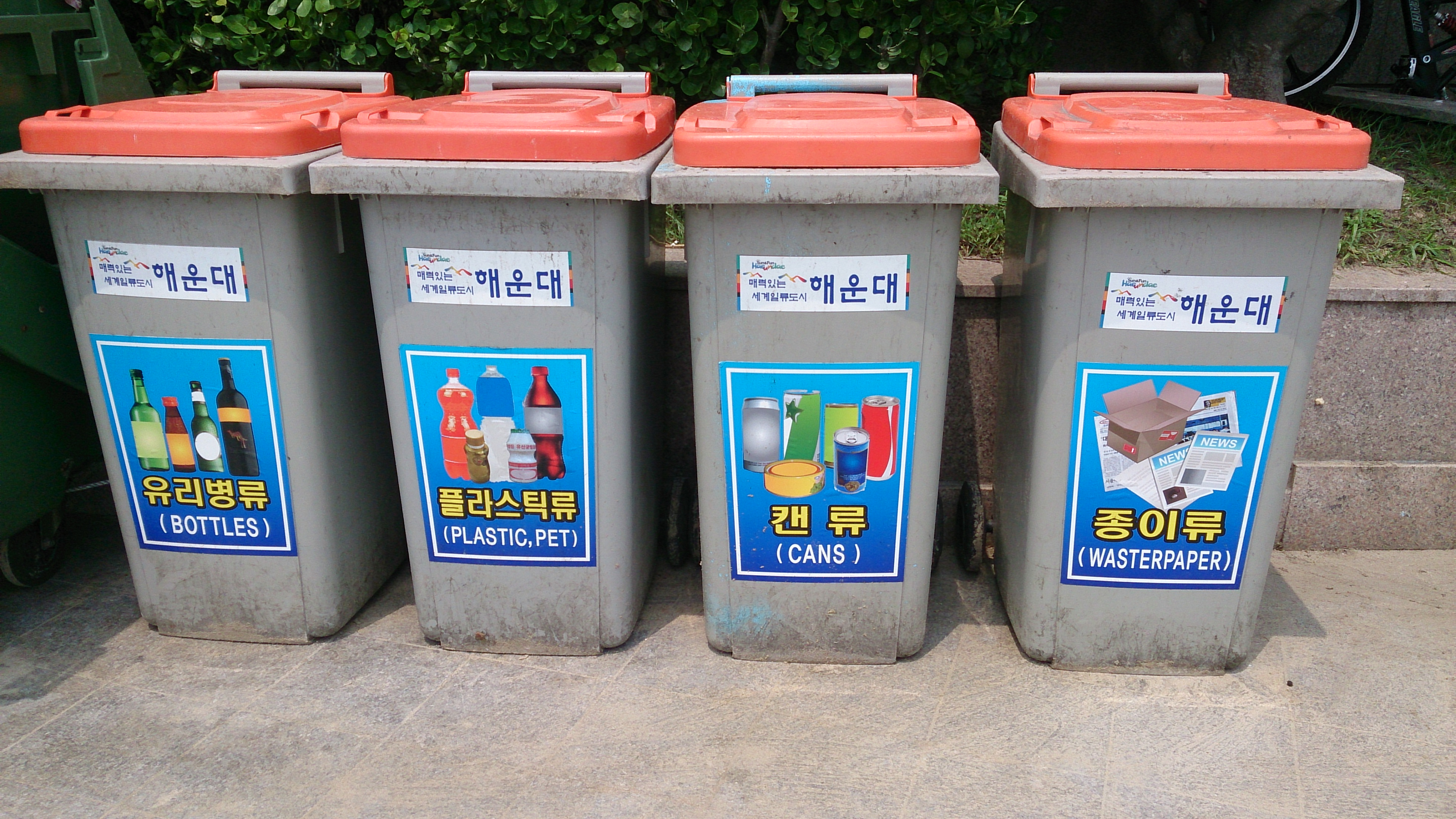
Recycling bins in Korea

Jongnyangje (Hangul: 종량제) is an organised waste management system for the effective collection and reuse of waste and resources in South Korea. All waste must be separated into general waste, food waste, recyclable items, or bulky items. Bulky items consist of waste that are too big to fit into the issued disposal bags, such as furniture, electrical appliances, and office items. These bulky items require special stickers attainable from district offices. Recycling is necessary in South Korea, and recyclable items are divided according to material type, from paper to plastics.

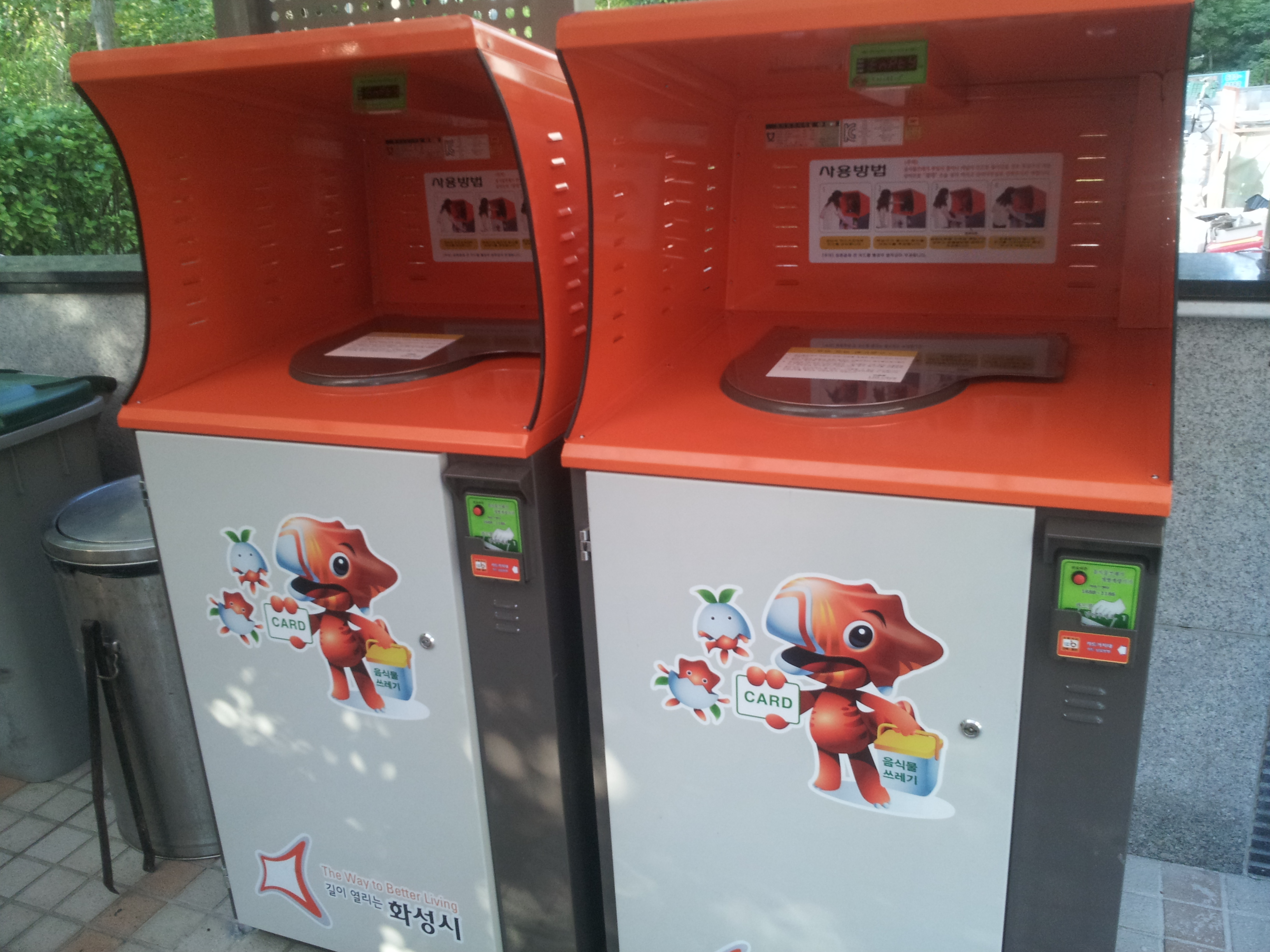
Food waste collection bins in South Korea

=== Food waste ===
Food waste is collected separately from general waste in special bags. These food disposal bags are known as eumsingmul sseuregi bongtu (Hangul: 음식물 쓰레기 봉투), and prices of these bags vary by size and district. A monthly fee respective to the amount of food wasted is then charged to each household, enabled through a Radio Frequency Identification (RFID) card. According to a 2026 study, expansions in the food waste fees "substantially reduces food waste by discouraging excessive grocery purchases."

Apart from charging fees for food wastage, South Korea also reduces food waste by reprocessing collected food into livestock feed. Since the South Korean government banned the dumping of food waste in landfills in 2005 and implemented food waste recycling in 2013, the amount of food waste being recycled increased dramatically. Citizens are encouraged to include only what animals can eat in these food disposal bags; bones, pits of fruits, and seeds, hence cannot be as considered food waste. The collected waste is then dried out and repurposed into feed appropriate for animal consumption.

Some food waste is turned into a fertiliser or food waste compost instead, after it has gone through processing and all moisture is removed. This fermented food waste fertiliser is an eco-friendly and organic option in cultivation of crops.

=== Plastic waste ===
South Korea ranks second in place for largest waste producer worldwide, with South Koreans using an average of 420 plastic bags annually. In order to counter this, South Korea banned all single-use plastic bags in supermarkets. Alternatives such as paper bags, multiple-use cloth shopping bags or recyclable containers will be offered instead, and profits will be funded towards waste disposal. This law was introduced with the intention of putting an end to non-biodegradable garbage in the world, as well as to manage and preserve natural resources and recyclable waste. This move was also the result of a revised law on the conservation of resources, and reuse of recyclable waste.

The law was implemented following a plastic waste handling crisis after China banned the importation of plastic garbage. This waste crisis caused South Korea's recycling firms to stop collecting garbage due to the financial loss incurred from the decrease in plastic prices. This resulted in plastic waste being left on the streets for weeks. The South Korean government was forced to come up with more sustainable ways to manage plastic waste instead of shipping it overseas.

=== e-waste ===
e-waste (or electronic waste) includes electrical or electronic devices or waste. Managing e-waste or waste electrical and electronic equipment (WEEE) is a major concern due to the magnitude of waste stream involved, as well as the toxic chemicals in the devices. Chemicals include barium, cadmium, chromium, lead, mercury, nickel, and bromated flame retardants. Discarded devices such as old computers, smartphones, and electrical appliances, may leak toxic chemicals if left in landfills. Items such as batteries and cell phones require additional care in disposal. To prevent leakage, the Seoul city government has partnered with SR Center to collect e-waste. Seoul city discards 10 tons of e-waste annually, with only a fifth of e-waste ending up in the special recycling centre. Devices are taken apart at the special recycling centre, where valuable metals such as gold, copper, or rare resources can be extracted.

Many parts of the world are researching on feasible and environmentally friendly ways to dispose of e-waste for the WEEE management system. Recycling processes have been established in several countries, but the WEEE waste management system has not been introduced in most countries. In response to the growing concern of electronic waste, ‘the Act on Resource Recycling of Waste Electrical Electronic Equipment (WEEE) and End-of-life Vehicles’ was introduced in 2007. This act is aimed at reducing the amount of e-waste ending up in landfills and incinerators, and improving the performance and lifespan of such electronic devices.

== Legislation ==
=== Waste management law ===
The Waste Management Law was first introduced in 1986. It provided a framework that waste management was not only about containment, but reducing waste as well. Since its introduction in 1986, there is more practice of systematic and integrated waste management in South Korea. The South Korean government also funded projects to promote this method of waste management. It covered all waste streams, from municipal solid waste to manure, construction/demolition waste, and infectious waste. In 1991, the Act on Treatment of Livestock Manure, Wastewater and Sewage to manage manure waste separately. In 1992, the Act on Resource Saving and Recycling Promotion was enacted to consider waste as a resource. Based on this act, the volume-based waste fee system was implemented with a pay as you throw concept which provided legal support for those who resided near waste disposal sites, with the NIMBY (not in my back yard) issues.

=== Zero waste society ===
South Korea is working its way to becoming a zero-waste society, aiming to achieve a 3% landfill rate and 87% recycle rate by 2020. This ratification is set to be extended to the year 2025 due to conflicts and setbacks between stakeholders.

=== Waste-to-energy policy ===
The South Korean Ministry of Environment (MOE) promoted a waste-to-energy policy to boost South Korea's self-sufficiency rate. The policy aims to reduce the cost of waste disposal through incineration and landfills. To generate electricity, fuel, and heating, waste gas, wood scraps, household waste, and other wastes are used in the conversion to energy. Energy production through waste is 10% cheaper than solar power, and 66% cheaper than wind power. This proves to be the most effective way of producing energy. In 2012, only 3.18% of new and renewable energy was produced, but the South Korean government hopes to increase the percentage to 20% by 2050.

== Recent challenges ==
China has been the dumping ground for the world's plastic for the longest time. In the 1990s, China saw discarded plastic as profitable, and the Chinese recreated the plastic into smaller, exportable bits and pieces. It was also cheaper for countries to export their plastic to China than discard it themselves. In November 2017, China stopped accepting contaminated plastic. This rejected plastic becomes absorbed by neighbouring countries like Thailand, Vietnam, the Philippines, and South Korea. Now, Southeast Asian countries are starting to reject this waste as well. In August 2018, Vietnam introduced strict restrictions on plastic scrap imports. Thailand followed suit, announcing a ban on electronic parts. In October 2018, Malaysia also announced a ban on imports of plastic scraps.

In early January 2019, the Philippines rejected 1,200 tons of South Korean waste deemed non-recyclable. It was shipped back to South Korea in 51 trash-filled containers. In addition, 5,100 tons of South Korean waste had been found to be imported illegally by the Philippines. This waste included batteries, bulbs, used dextrose tubes, electronic equipment and nappies. South Korea and the Philippines are in talks about how the waste should be repatriated.
