= Danwon District =

District of Ansan, South Korea

- Non-autonomous District
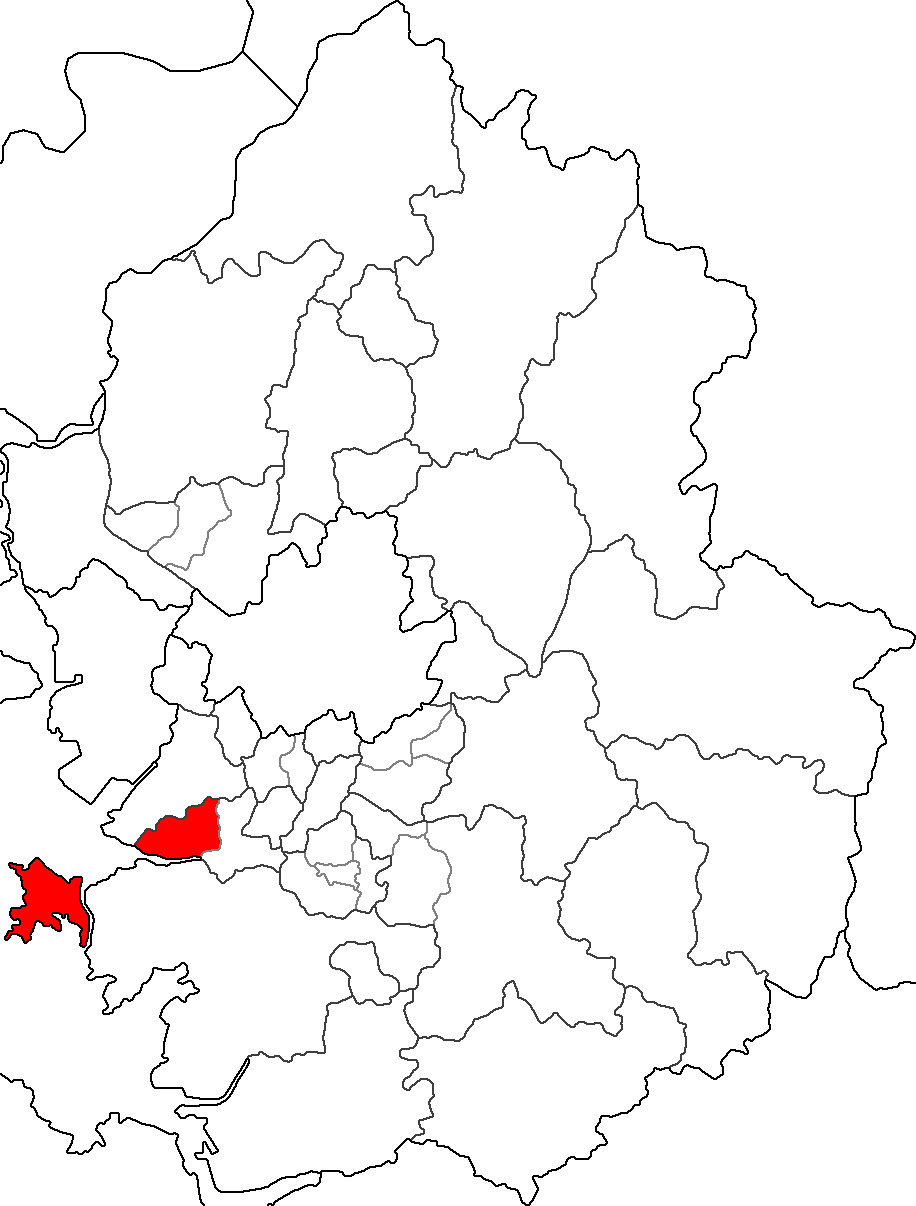
- Map of Gyeonggi Province highlighting Danwon District.
- Coordinates: 37.319°N 126.812°E
- Country: South Korea
- Region: Sudogwon (SCA)
- Province: Gyeonggi
- City: Ansan
- Administrative divisions: 12 dong

Area
  - Total: 91.23 km^{2} (35.22 sq mi)

Population (July 31, 2013)
  - Total: 371,434
  - Density: 4,071/km^{2} (10,540/sq mi)
  - Dialect: Seoul
- Website: Danwon District Office

Korean name
- Hangul: 단원구
- Hanja: 檀園區
- RR: Danwon-gu
- MR: Tanwŏn-gu

Danwon District (Korean: 단원구) is a district of Ansan, Gyeonggi Province, South Korea. The name "Danwon" came from the nickname of Kim Hong Do, a famous Korean artist of the 18th century. The previous name of Kim Hong Do's hometown was "Ansan"; the residents wanted to rename the district so that it related to their great artist Kim Hong-do.

== Administrative divisions ==
Danwon District is divided into the following dongs:

Name	Hangul	Hanja	Population	Households	Area (km^{2})
Wa-dong, Ansan	와동	瓦洞	47,032	19,558	3.23
Gojan 1-dong	고잔 1동	古棧洞	23,955	9,167	1.75
Gojan 2-dong	고잔 2동	古棧洞	25,332	9,635	1.87
Hosu-dong	호수동	湖水洞	44,986	14,808	2.48
Wongokbon-dong	원곡본동	元谷洞	51,582	15,264	8.12
Wongok 1-dong	원곡 1동	元谷洞	14,359	4,287	0.95
Wongok 2-dong	원곡 2동	元谷洞	16,944	5,301	0.96
Choji-dong	초지동	草芝洞	54,968	17,672	21.16
Seonbu 1-dong	선부 1동	仙府洞	19,205	7,466	0.86
Seonbu 2-dong	선부 2동	仙府洞	28,318	11,374	2.07
Seonbu 3-dong	선부 3동	仙府洞	37,179	13,720	5.81
Daebu-dong	대부동	大阜洞	7,574	3,766	42.37

== See also ==
- Sangnok District
