= Bugok-dong =

Bugok-dong may refer to

- Bugok-dong, Busan
- Bugok-dong, Ansan
- Bugok-dong, Uiwang
- Bugok-dong, Gunpo
