= The Leninist Banner =

The Leninist Banner may refer to:

- Koryo Ilbo, a Korean-language newspaper called the Leninist Banner (Korean: 레닌기치; Hanja: 레닌旗幟; Russian: Ленин кич) between 1938 and 1991.
- Lenina Bayrah (Russian: Ленинна байрах), a Dargin-language newspaper published in Dagestan ASSR, Soviet Union.
- Moscow Region Today (Russian: Подмосковье сегодня), a Russian newspaper originally called Leninist Banner (Russian: Ленинское знамя)
