= Evergreen tree =

Evergreen tree may refer to:

- Evergreen, a plant that has leaves throughout the year, making it always green
- "Evergreen Tree", a song by Cliff Richard from his 1960 album Me and My Shadows, written by Aaron Schroeder and Wally Gold
- Swedish table tennis player Jan-Ove Waldner, known in China as Chang Qing Shu 'Evergreen Tree' because of his extraordinary longevity and competitiveness
- Korean novel Sangnoksu (1936), made into two movies titled The Evergreen Tree in 1961 and 1978
