= Chŏng Sangjin =

Soviet-Korean soldier (1918–2013)

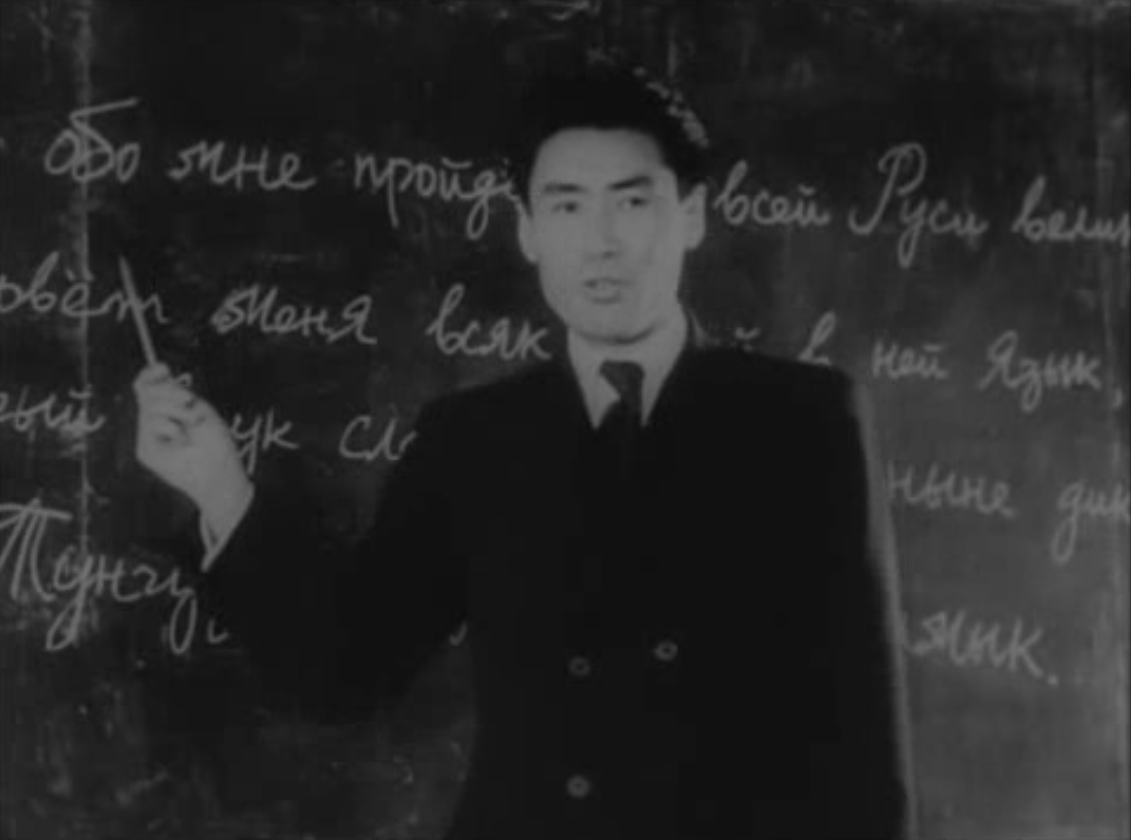
- Chŏng teaching a class at Kim Il Sung University (1946)

First Vice Minister of the Ministry of Culture and Propaganda
- In office March 24, 1955 – September 2, 1955
- Appointed by: Kim Il Sung
- Preceded by: Park Taewon
- Succeeded by: Chang Ha-il
- In office December 1, 1953 – April 12, 1954
- Appointed by: Kim Il Sung
- Preceded by: Kim Kang
- Succeeded by: An Mak

Second Vice Minister of the Ministry of Culture and Propaganda
- In office September 2, 1948 – September 9, 1953
- Appointed by: Kim Il Sung
- Succeeded by: An Hoe-nam

Personal details
- Born: May 5, 1918 Sinhanch'on, Vladivostok, Russian Soviet Republic
- Died: June 15, 2013 (aged 95) Moscow, Russia
- Citizenship: Soviet Union; Russia

Military service
- Branch/service: Soviet Navy
- Years of service: 1945–1957
- Battles/wars: Seishin Operation

Korean name
- Hangul: 정상진
- Hanja: 鄭尙鎭; 鄭尙進
- RR: Jeong Sangjin
- MR: Chŏng Sangjin

Childhood name
- Hangul: 영준
- RR: Yeongjun
- MR: Yŏngjun

Nickname
- Hangul: 정률, 정율
- Hanja: 鄭律
- RR: Jeong Ryul, Jeong Yul
- MR: Chŏng Ryul, Chŏng Yul

Chŏng Sangjin (Korean: 정상진; May 5, 1918 – June 15, 2013) was a Soviet poet, bureaucrat, academic, and military officer. He was the only ethnic Korean among 60 Soviet paratroopers that first liberated parts of Korea under Japanese rule during World War II. He was also known by his Russian name Yuri Danilovich Ten (Russian: Юрий Данилович Тен) or the Korean nickname derived from "Yuri", Ryul (률). His name is also Cyrillized as Ten San Din (Тен Сан Дин).

He stayed in North Korea on orders from the Soviet government and spent 13 years total there, serving in various roles in the North Korean government and at Kim Il Sung University. However, after Soviet-aligned Koreans were purged from the North Korean government, he returned to the Soviet Union. He then became a critic of North Korea and worked as a reporter, writer, and Korean reunification activist.

He died in Moscow on June 15, 2013, at the age of 95.

== Early life ==
Chŏng was born in the Korean enclave Sinhanch'on in Vladivostok, Primorskaya Oblast, Russian Soviet Republic on May 5, 1918.

His father, Chŏng Ch'imun (정치문), was originally from Myongchon County, North Hamgyong Province, Joseon, but went in exile to Russia after the Japanese occupation of Korea. Chŏng's father was an ardent nationalist and a vocal advocate for the liberation of Korea, which left an impression on Chŏng.

Chŏng's mother was illiterate and remained so even until the 1950s. Chŏng's father was well-versed in Chinese literature. By age five, Chŏng was learning to read and write from his father.

At the time, Vladivostok was a hub for Soviet Koreans (who are also called Koryo-saram). As was common with Korean culture during that time, education was valued extremely highly. A Russian observer remarked that the Koreans of Vladivostok insisted on rigorous schooling, despite their poverty. Chŏng initially enrolled in a Russian-language school, but switched to a Korean-language school at the insistence of his father.

In 1936, he studied literature at the Wŏndong Korean College of Education in Vladivostok (원동고려사범대학; 遠東高麗師範大學). He later claimed that by this point, he was a devoted communist.

=== Deportation to Kazakhstan ===
In fall 1937, his studies were interrupted when he and many Koreans in the Soviet Union were forcibly deported to Kazakhstan. While on the month-long train journey, he and his friends huddled together to avoid freezing to death, and he recited poetry to them to comfort them. Tens of thousands of Koreans died on the journey. After disembarking from the train, he witnessed several Kazakh women handing out bread from the backs of donkeys. In an August 2007 interview, Chŏng said of this experience: (Note: 『카자흐 사람들, 참 마음씨가 고운 사람들입니다. 그들이 아니었으면 우리들은 다 죽었을 겁니다. 우리 민족은 그 고마움을 결코 잊어서는 안 됩니다』)

The Kazakh people are very kind. If it weren't for them, we would have all died. Korean people should never forget their gratitude towards them.

In October 1938, his father was arrested and executed by the Soviet government. Chŏng made a point of continuing in the Korean independence movement in his father's stead, and became disillusioned with both communism and Joseph Stalin. In total, around 2,800 Korean intellectuals were executed without trial. The location of his father's grave remains unknown as of 2007.

His college reopened in Kazakhstan, and he graduated from it in 1940. Around this time, he befriended Cho Ki-chon, who lectured on world literature at the college. Later, Cho became a landmark poet in the North Korean literary canon.

== Career ==
Chŏng then taught literature at a secondary school in Kyzylorda. In 1941, he submitted his first poem to the Lenin Kichi, the Koryo-saram newspaper that he would later work for full-time in 1961. He continued submitting essays, translations, and literary criticism to the Kichi even into the late 2000s.

=== World War II ===
In 1941, after Japan entered World War II, Chŏng eagerly made seven attempts to enlist in the Soviet Army and see active combat, but was refused due to restrictions on Koreans joining the military. In 1942, he became a member of the Communist Party. He was finally called to combat in March 1945, during rising tensions between Japan and the Soviet Union. His mother reportedly said during his departure "Your father always regretted not being able to fight the Japanese, now you're going. I can't stand in your way." (Note: 『아버지가 늘 일본 놈들과 싸우지 못하는 것을 안타까워하시더니, 네가 이렇게 싸우러 나가게 됐구나. 나는 너의 길을 막지 못하겠다』)

He was sent to Vladivostok on Russky Island, as reconnaissance for the marine corps of the Soviet Pacific Fleet under the command of Viktor Leonov. On August 9, 1945, he rejoiced when he heard the Soviet declaration of war on Japan, as he saw it as a key opportunity to liberate Korea.

On August 11, he and 60 other paratroopers reportedly participated in the first Soviet military action in Korea during World War II: the liberation of Unggi County (later renamed Sŏnbong, literally "Vanguard", due to its role as the first liberated area). He was the only ethnic Korean in that group, which he found depressing, as it was largely a group of foreigners who was liberating his homeland. He had the rank of sergeant at the time, and was often called Yura (Юра) by his fellow Russians.

The liberation of Unggi was bloodless, but civilians still reportedly ran in fear of the Soviet troops. Chŏng stopped them, revealed that he was Korean, and announced their liberation. He and the civilians shed tears of joy. He later recalled this incident in a 1946 poem entitled Unggi Harbor! My Footsteps Drenched with Tears.

Decades later, Kim Il Sung claimed that he and the Korean People's Army (KPA) had liberated Unggi instead of the Soviets. Chŏng said of this claim in 2007: (Note: 『나는 웅기는 물론, 나진·청진에서 단 한 사람의 인민혁명군도, 항일투사도, 혁명가도 戰場(전장)에서 보지 못했습니다. 전투에 참전한 조선인은 나 한 사람뿐이었소. 우리 부대가 피를 흘리며 청진에서 싸우고 있을 때, 金日成이나 오백룡은 하바로프스크 인근 왜트스코예 마을에 주둔한 소련군 88정찰여단 막사에서 편하게 지내고 있었습니다. [...] 내가 북한에 있던 1950년대 중반까지 金日成은 「내가 이끄는 조선인민혁명군 부대가 북한을 해방시켰다」는 얘기는 감히 꺼내지 못했습니다』)

In Najin, Chongjin, or let alone Unggi, I did not see a single Korean People's Army fighter, anti-Japanese guerrilla, or communist revolutionary on the battlefield. I was the only Korean in battle. While our unit was bleeding and fighting in Chongjin, Kim Il Sung and O Paek-ryong were living comfortably in the barracks of the 88th Reconnaissance Brigade of the Soviet Army stationed in the village of Vyatskoye near Khabarovsk. [...] Before I left North Korea in the mid-1950s, Kim Il Sung didn't dare make [that claim] in front of me.

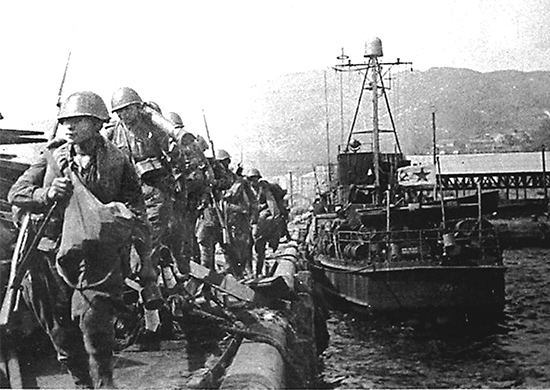
Soviet troops during the Seishin Operation (August 15, 1945)

They then fought in the Seishin Operation against the Japanese, who had retreated from Manchuria into Chongjin. Despite allegedly being severely outnumbered and losing 29 fighters, they won on August 18.

Fighting lasted around 24 days, until the September 2 surrender of Japan. (Note: By this point, his rank was senior sergeant.)

=== Activities in North Korea ===
Chŏng was initially recalled to Vladivostok, but a week later was sent to Soviet-occupied Wonsan under orders from Moscow. In October 1945, he became deputy director of education of the city. Amongst his fellow Koreans, he went by the nickname "Ryul", which was derived from his Russian nickname "Yura".

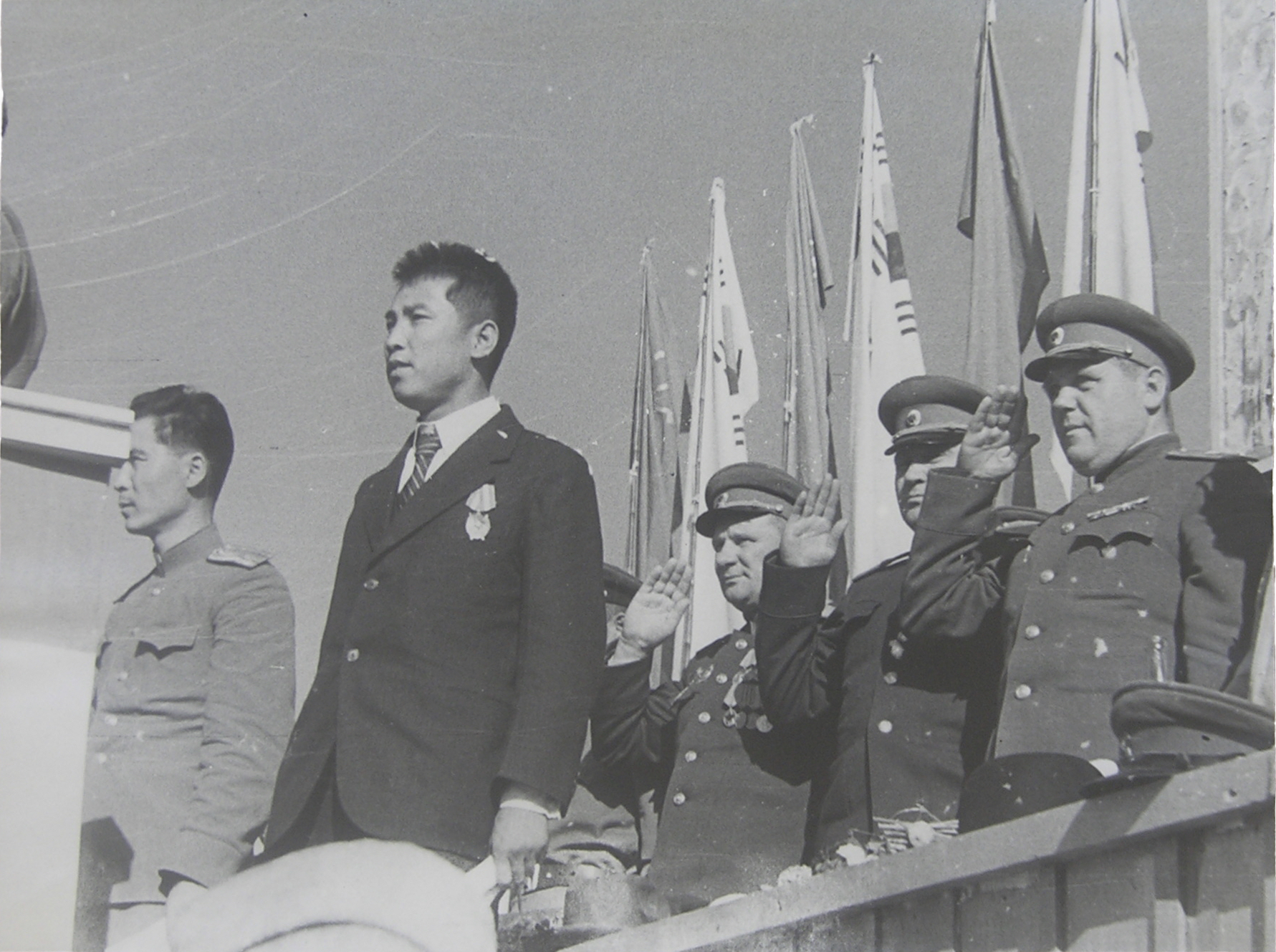
Kim Il Sung (second from left) with Soviet officials a month after he met Chŏng for the first time (October 14, 1945)

On September 18, 1945, he was informed by command that he was to meet Kim Il Sung for the first time on the next day. Chŏng was reportedly excited to meet Kim, expecting him to be a graying and physically imposing rebel, befitting his reputation as a fierce guerilla. Chŏng was surprised to find Kim youthful, fresh-faced, and thin. Kim arrived around 8 am by the Soviet boat Pugachev, (Note: Kim introduced himself using his birth name, "Kim Sŏngju" (김성주). This confused Chŏng, who knew Kim as "Kim Il Sung", and caused him to wonder if he was meeting the wrong person.) accompanied by 60 members of the KPA. Chŏng asked Kim where he and the fighters had been during the bloodshed, and Kim gave a muted response. Chŏng then suspected that the Soviet government had intentionally held Kim back.

In 1946, Chŏng and several others published a book of poetry inspired by the liberation of Korea called Ŭnghyang. The book, particularly due to one of its poems Dawn Map, was accused of being overly decadent and was met with censorship from Pyongyang. The author of Dawn Map then defected to the South.

In July 1946, he was appointed deputy director of the Ministry of Education in South Hamgyong Province. Here, he met fellow author Han Sorya. Chŏng had previously read Han's writing, in which Han heaped praise upon Kim Il Sung, but in person he allegedly found Han to not know much about Kim on a personal level. But after these articles caught the eye of Kim, they quickly elevated Han to a position of prominence in the North Korean literary scene.

In spring 1947, he became Vice Chairman of the North Korean Federation of Literature and Arts. Around this time, he also met Pak Chang-ok, who had actually been two years above him back in university. He also observed and was impressed by Kim Ku and Hong Myong-hui at the North–South conference of April 1948. Chŏng admired Hong's work and character greatly, and often sought out his advice after he remained in North Korea. In summer 1948, Chŏng became head of the Department of Russian Languages and Literature at Kim Il Sung University.

Between September 2, 1948, and September 9, 1953, he served in the newly formed North Korea (DPRK) as the first Second Vice Minister of the Ministry of Culture and Propaganda. He later served as First Vice Minister between December 1, 1953, and April 12, 1954, and again between March 24, 1955, and September 2, 1955. He often assisted Ho Jong-suk with her work, as she was frequently ill around this time. He also occasionally met with Kim Il Sung.

On June 25, 1950, (Note: In Chŏng's 2012 interview with Chen, Chŏng reportedly recalls the announcement of the invasion as June 24, but unless he's referring to some internal broadcast, the first public announcement was on June 25.) Chŏng heard Kim Il Sung's announcement of the invasion of South Korea on the radio. He was personally surprised by the announcement, and believed Kim's claim that the South had invaded the North first. At the time, he was head of artillery supply in the Korean People's Army. Shortly afterwards, he heard from friends within the North Korean government that, after receiving reluctant approval from the Soviet government, Kim had manufactured a reason to invade the South.

After the July 1953 armistice was signed, Chŏng spent two weeks in Seoul as the head of the North Korean effort to exchange prisoners of war. In August 1955, in celebration of the 10th anniversary of the liberation of Korea, he visited the Soviet Union as part of a cultural delegation composed of 18 North Korean artists and toured various cities, including Moscow, Leningrad, Tashkent, Almaty, and Novosibirsk.

=== Purge from North Korea ===
Upon his return from the cultural tour in September 1955, Chŏng learned via a public announcement that he and several other Soviet Koreans were to be stripped of their posts. He was then appointed to the relatively unimportant role of Director of the Science Library of the DPRK Academy of Sciences.

After the March 5, 1953 death of Joseph Stalin, Kim increased his opposition of Soviet influence in North Korea. Tensions between the pro-Kim and pro-Soviet factions grew, culminating in the failed 1957 August Faction Incident, in which Soviet- and Chinese-aligned Koreans tried to purge Kim Il Sung. Chŏng was allegedly among Kim's most distrusted Soviet Koreans around this time. He had never abandoned his Soviet citizenship, partly out of fear that he too could one day be purged. His mother came to visit him from Kazakhstan; she urged him to return to Kazakhstan where his family was.

On October 22, 1955, Chŏng, Pak, and several others appeared before the Politburo of the Workers' Party of Korea, where they were chastised by Kim Il Sung as lacking juche: "self-reliance". According to Bae Jin-yeong of the Monthly Chosun, this was the first usage of the term juche in North Korea, which later became the name of the state ideology.

In October 1957, after receiving permission from Kim Il Sung to leave the country, Chŏng and thirteen Soviet Koreans left North Korea and returned to the Soviet Union. He tried to say goodbye to Ho Jong-suk, whom he had considered a good friend, but she coldly dismissed him. In 2007, he said he would have liked to meet her again above anyone else from his time in North Korea. After Chŏng and the others left North Korea, reprisals against Soviet Koreans reportedly greatly slowed. Chŏng later said of his departure: (Note: 『슬펐습니다. 저는 평양을 사랑했고, 북한을 사랑했습니다. 저는 금강산처럼 아름다운 곳을 보지 못했습니다. 특히 붉은 해가 물속에서 쑥 올라오는 삼일포의 일출, 아, 그런 일출경은 세계 어디에도 없을 것입니다』)

I was sad. I loved Pyongyang and I loved North Korea. I've never seen a place as beautiful as Mount Kumgang. In particular, the sunrise of Lake Samilpo, when the red sun rises from the water, ah, there's no other sunrise like it.

== Later life and death ==
After returning, Chŏng first went to Tashkent, Uzbek SSR, where he studied journalism for four years at a Soviet government school. He then returned to Kazakhstan, where he worked in the editorial department of the Lenin Kichi newspaper between 1961 and late 1991. He wrote an editorial in the December 19, 1990, final edition of the Kichi before it changed its name to Koryo Ilbo in 1991. While he had expected the Soviet Union to one day collapse beginning in the late 1930s, he had not wanted it to happen. However, upon observing how the Kazakhs relished their newfound independence after its collapse, he changed his mind.

From 1991 to 1998, he served as president for a fund that supported repressed Soviet Koreans in North Korea. From 1992, he and several other North Korean defectors founded and served as Chairman of the Foundation for North Korean Democratization and Liberation (조선민주통일구국전선), which was headquartered in Tokyo. From 2001 to 2005, he was appointed by the South Korean President Kim Dae-jung to be on the Peaceful Unification Advisory Council. Chŏng remained firm in his belief that North Korea would eventually democratize, and criticized its government sharply. In 2007, he said: (Note: 『소련은 [...] 일본 식민 통치자들보다 더 무서운 참극을 전체 한반도 인민들에게 가져다 주었습니다. 이는 북한의 비참한 현실이 웅변으로 보여 주고 있습니다』)

The Soviet Union [...] brought a tragedy more terrible than Japanese colonialism to the Korean peninsula. This is eloquently embodied by the miserable reality of North Korea.

Chŏng continued writing even until the late 2000s. He not only published poetry and literary criticism, but even travel experiences and reviews of movies and plays. In 2005, he published a book of his memoirs entitled A Swan Song from Amur Bay: Memoirs of North Korean and Soviet Literary Artists in South Korea. He moved from Almaty to Moscow in January 2009 along with his daughters.

Even until 2012, Chŏng reported feeling healthy. He stated he had been consistently physically active since his deportation to Kazakhstan in 1937, exercising an hour per day every morning. He was also described by several reporters in the years before his death as surprisingly mentally sharp in his old age.

Chŏng died in Moscow on June 15, 2013, at the age of 95. He was cremated, and his ashes are held in the Korean cemetery in Shcherbinka.

== Legacy and awards ==
In 2007, Chŏng said he was most proud of his role in the Seishin Operation. He also reportedly played a significant role in spreading Soviet literature in North Korea.

He received an Order of the Red Banner in August 1945, and the Medal "For the Victory over Japan" in September 1945 from the Soviet government for his service in Korea. He also received the Jubilee Medal in 1985 for his service during World War II. As part of the Lenin Kichi staff, he received the Order of Friendship of Peoples award in 1988.

== Personal life ==
Chŏng was reportedly over 180 cm (5 ft 11 in) tall and physically attractive. According to a 2012 interview with Chŏng, Kim Il Sung himself complimented Chŏng on his looks.

He converted to Christianity while stationed in Korea in 1945, after reading a bible translated into Korean. He was fond of Soviet culture, although critical of its totalitarian government. He highly admired authors such as Leo Tolstoy and Alexander Pushkin.

He was married four times and had two daughters. He expressed regret near the end of his life for not having been more active in his children's lives.

== Bibliography ==
=== Poetry ===
- Ŭnghyang (poetry collection) (1946)
  - Unggi Harbor! My Footsteps Drenched with Tears (Note: 웅기항! 눈물에 젖은 나의 발자취)

=== Essays and books ===
- The Poet and Reality (Note: 시인과 현실)
- On Romanticism (Note: 로멘찌즘에 대하여)
- A Swan Song from Amur Bay: Memoirs of North Korean and Soviet Literary Artists (Note: 아무르 만에서 부르는 백조의 노래: 북한과 소련의 문학 예술인들 회상기) (2005)
