= Surisan =

Mountain in South Korea

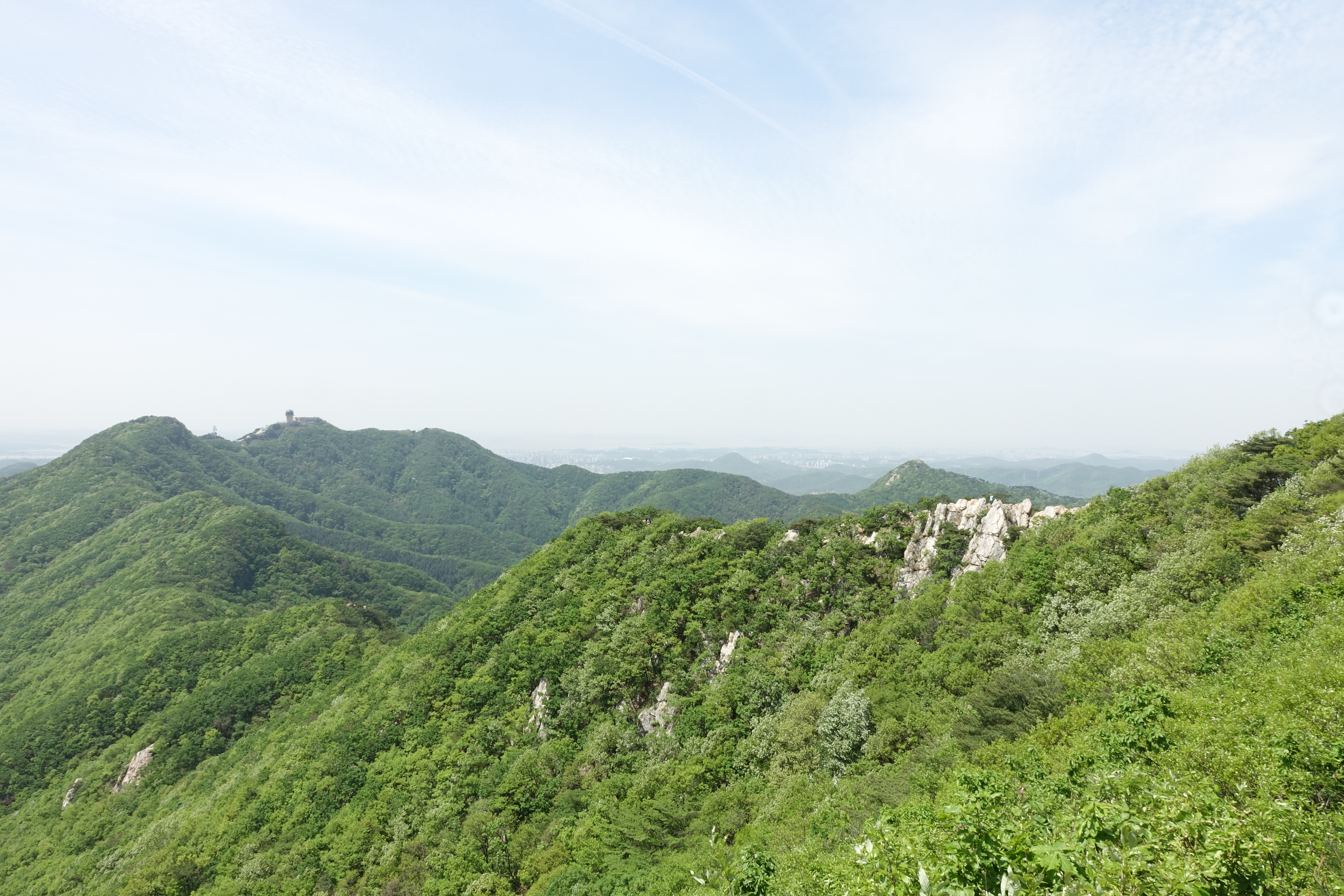

Highest point
- Elevation: 469 m (1,539 ft)
- Coordinates: 37°22′N 126°52′E

Geography
- Location: South Korea

Climbing
- Easiest route: Hike, scramble

Korean name
- Hangul: 수리산
- RR: Surisan
- MR: Surisan

Surisan (Korean: 수리산) is a 488 metres (1,601 ft) mountain located in Gyeonggi Province, South Korea, straddling the cities of Anyang and Gunpo. Designated as Gyeonggi Provincial Park by the Gyeonggi Provincial Government in 2009, the mountain is notable for its cultural and natural significance.

Several Korean Buddhist temples are located on Surisan mountain and the surrounding areas. Surisan was designated a Park of Gyeonggi by Gyeonggi-do province in 2009.

== Geography ==
Surisan is situated in Gyeonggi Province, South Korea, at coordinates 37.20°N 126.33°E and 37.24°N 126.55°E. It forms part of the Gwangju Mountain Range and straddles the cities of Anyang (to the northwest) and Gunpo (to the southeast).

The mountain rises to 469 m (1,539 ft) above sea level at its highest peak, Tae-Eul (태을봉), and spans a total area of 36.16 km^{2} (13.96 sq mi). Administrative divisions within its vicinity include portions of Anyang (19.5 km^{2} (7.53 sq mi)), Gunpo (10.48 km^{2} (4.05 sq mi)), and Ansan (6.18 km^{2} (2.39 sq mi)).

=== Peaks ===
Surisan features multiple prominent peaks:

- Gwanmobong (관모봉): 426 metres (1,398 ft) in the northwest.
- Seulgibong (슬기봉): 451.5 m (1,481 ft) in the southwest.
- Suambong (수암봉): 395 metres (1,296 ft).
- Taeeulbong (태을봉): 489 metres (1,604 ft), the highest point, located centrally.

Tae-Eul Peak derives its name from the rare feng shui phenomenon observed at sunrise, where its shadow resembles a large eagle (tae-eul) with outstretched wings.

=== Geology and hydrology ===
The mountain's peaks and cliffs are predominantly composed of quartz, while its valleys contain weathered biotite schist, hornblende gneiss, and other gneissic formations. Surisan is also noted for its natural mineral springs.

=== Flora and fauna ===
Surisan's slopes are blanketed by deciduous broadleaf forests, primarily oak (Quercus spp.) and Mongolian mulberry (Morus mongolica). In spring, the mountain is renowned for its vibrant azalea blooms (Rhododendron spp.), attracting hikers. Mammal species inhabiting the area include wild boar (Sus scrofa), raccoon dogs (Nyctereutes procyonoides), weasels, moles, and rabbits.

=== Cultural sites ===
Several historic Korean Buddhist temples are located on the mountain, including Sangyeonsa (상연사), Yongjinsa (용진사), and Surisa (수리사).

== Etymology ==
The origin of the name Surisan (수리산) is debated, with three primary theories proposed:

1. Eagle Resemblance: The name may derive from the mountain's silhouette, where its peaks are said to resemble the shape of an eagle (suri in Korean).
2. Surisa Temple: During the reign of King Jinheung of Silla (r. 540–576 CE), Surisa Temple (수리사) was established on the mountain. The temple's name—interpreted as a "holy place for purifying body (su) and mind (ri)"—reportedly lent its name to the mountain.
3. Royal Training Ground: A folk tradition claims that a son of a Joseon dynasty king (often identified as a prince or royal heir) trained (su; 수) on the mountain. The name allegedly combines su (修, "training") and ri (李, the surname Yi or Lee), though historical records validating this account are scarce.

== History ==
=== Joseon dynasty ===
Surisan was a prominent geographical feature during the Joseon dynasty (1392–1897). It is referenced in historical texts such as:

- Sejong Sillok Jiriji (세종실록지리지; lit. 'King Sejong's Treatise on Geography'), which describes the mountain as "called Chi San" in its entry on Ansan.
- SinJung DongGukYeoJiSeongRam (신증동국여지승람; lit. 'Revised and Augmented Survey of the Geography of Korea'), which notes in its Ansan section: "Surisan, also referred to as Gyeonbulsan (견불산)." The text's Gwacheon entry further specifies that Surisan lies "south of Gwacheon."
- Taedongjiji (대동지지; lit. 'Comprehensive Geography of the Great East'), compiled by 19th-century Joseon cartographer Gim Jeong-ho (김정호). The Ansan section states: "To the east [of Ansan], also called Tae-Eulsan (태을산) and Gyeonbulsan, this mountain is notably rugged and lofty."

=== Battle of Surisan (1951) ===
During the Korean War, the Battle of Surisan occurred from February 1–2, 1951, in northwestern Suwon. As part of Operation Thunderbolt, the United States First Corps launched a counteroffensive on January 25, 1951, to retake the Han River's southern bank. Key engagements included:

- The U.S. 25th Infantry Division and the Turkish Brigade assaulting the Chinese 149th Division (50th Army, Chinese People's Volunteer Army), which had entrenched itself on Surisan.
- Coordinated support from the U.S. 999th Armored Field Artillery Battalion and 89th Medium Tank Battalion, enabling a pincer movement that dislodged Chinese forces from the mountain.

The United Nations Forces repelled an immediate Chinese counterattack, forcing the 149th Division to retreat north to Anyang. This victory allowed UN troops to advance and secure the Han River line by mid-February.

== Folktale ==
=== Yellow Rock Tale ===
Yellow Rock (Hwangdol-bawi, 황돌바위) is a prominent boulder located on Gwanmo Peak (관모봉), near Sansinje Temple (산신제사원). According to legend:

During the Joseon dynasty, a king grieved over his lack of an heir for over 40 years. After fervent prayers by the royal court, a prince was finally born. When war erupted in the prince's third year, he was sent to Ganghwa Island (강화도) for safety. During the voyage, a storm capsized his boat. A giant turtle emerged, rescuing the prince and carrying him to the shores of Gwanmo Peak.

Stranded for days and starving, the prince grew desperate. The turtle ventured to a nearby village to find food, but the prince—mistaking its absence for abandonment—struck a boulder in anger. The impact caused the rock to split, crushing the prince and mortally wounding the returning turtle. The prince's blood allegedly stained the rock yellow, giving Yellow Rock its name.

A nearby village in Anyang commemorates the tale with Turtle Rock (Geobuk-bawi, 거북바위), a stone monument said to mark the turtle's final resting place.

== Sport ==
=== Mountain biking ===
Surisan is a popular destination for mountain biking, with several trails accessible via Seoul Subway Line 4. Notable routes include:

- Gunpo Central Library Trail: Begins near Gunpo Central Library, ascends 200 meters (660 ft) to a temple entrance, and spans approximately 11 km (6.8 mi). This trail is considered one of the easiest in the Seoul Metropolitan Area due to its moderate slope, stable terrain, and scenic views. Most riders complete the course in two hours.
- Ridge Trail: Extends southeast from the mountain's five-way intersection.
- Descent Route: A narrow road descending from the same intersection.

Most trails are unsuitable for standard cross-country bikes due to steep inclines, uneven surfaces (notably on the Anyang-side "bottleneck" trail), and limited width. The Sukbong-Jangmobong Trail is designated for hikers only.

=== Hiking and climbing ===
Surisan's hiking trails largely overlap with mountain biking routes, though several paths cater specifically to pedestrians:

- Walking Trails: Frequent benches are installed along routes popular with novice hikers and locals.
- Water Access: Hikers must carry sufficient water, as natural springs are scarce outside the summer rainy season. A freshwater spring is located near the Gunpo Central Library entrance, and Banwol reservoir lies southwest of the mountain.

The terrain includes rugged slopes and forested paths, with limited amenities (e.g., no refreshment stalls).

== Recent initiatives ==
=== Forest exploration class ===
Established in 2017, the Surisan Forest Exploration Class is a community-driven program spearheaded by Anyang to promote environmental education and local engagement. In May 2018, it was designated a flagship initiative under the city's Urban Renewal New Deal Project for its innovative approach to connecting youth with nature.

- Structure: Professional forest guides lead schoolchildren through Surisan's woodland ecosystems, combining hands-on activities with detailed explanations of local flora.
- Focus: Participants learn about forest ecology, biodiversity, and sustainable practices while engaging in exploratory tasks.

The program has been recognized as a model for integrating environmental education into urban renewal efforts.

=== Atopy forest experience class ===
On November 6, 2017, Surisan Forest Park hosted an Atopy Forest Experience Class for 50 children and parents. The event followed a two-month theoretical training program on managing atopic dermatitis and allergic rhinitis, organized by the Sanbon Health Center.

- Activities: Guided forest walks, nature-based therapy sessions, and experiential learning about the health benefits of phytoncides (antimicrobial compounds released by trees).
- Health Impact: Participants engaged in immunity-boosting activities, leveraging Surisan's natural environment to alleviate symptoms of atopic conditions.

The Sanbon Health Center, which oversees Surisan's public health initiatives, operates 43 regional facilities dedicated to asthma relief and preventive care, offering year-round education and support.
