= List of schools in Sejong City =

This is a list of schools in Sejong City.

== History ==
The Sejong City Office of Education was to be established in July 2012.

Sejong City introduced a "smart education" program, and various families from the Chungcheong area moved to Sejong City. By 2012 there were so many families with children in the Cheotmaeul neighborhood that the schools there were overcrowded.

Dodamyu, Elementary, Middle, and High Schools and Yonseiyu Elementary School had planned names of Bangchukyu Elementary, Middle, and High School and Jinuiyu Elementary School, respectively.

In February 2013 the city government asked to have five new schools built in Residential Zone 1.

== Senior High Schools ==
All schools are public schools.

- Bangok High School
- Boram High School
- Dajeong High School
- Dodam High School
- Duru High School
- Goun High School
- Haemil High School
- Saerom High School
- Sejong High School
- Sejong Daeseong High School (Daesung High School)
- Sejong Girls' High School
- Yangji High School
- Sejong Campus High School
- Sejong Academy of Science and Arts
- Sejong Global High School
- Sodam High School

== Special Purpose High Schools ==
- Sejong Arts High School
- Sejong International High School
- Sejong Academy of Science and Arts(for the Gifted)

== Specialized High Schools ==
- Sejong Jang Yeongsil High School
- Sejong Mirae High School

== Middle schools ==
All schools are public schools.

- Areum Middle School
- Bangok Middle School
- Boram Middle School
- Bugang Middle School
- Jochiwon Middle School
- Jochiwon Girls' Middle School
- Dajeong Middle School
- Duru Middle School
- Dodam Middle School
- Duru Middle School
- Eojin Middle School
- Geulbot Middle School
- Geonui Middle School
- Geumho Middle School
- Goun Middle School
- Haemil Middle School
- Hansol Middle School
  - By 2012 there was overcrowding, so the Sejong City government planned to build additional schools.
- Janggi Middle School
- Jiphyeon Middle School
- Jongchon Middle School
- Naseong Middle School
- Saerom Middle School
- Saetteum Middle School
- Saeum Middle School
- Sejong Middle School
- Sodam Middle School
- Suhyun Middle School
- Yangji Middle School
- Yeondong Middle School
- Yeonseo Middle School

== Elementary schools ==
All schools are public schools. As of November 14, 2023, there are 50 public elementary schools in Sejong City.

- Areum Elementary School
- Bangok Elementary School
- Boram Elementary School
- Bugang Elementary School
- Chamsaem Elementary School
- Dabit Elementary School
- Dajeong Elementary School
- Daepyeong Elementary School
- Dodam Elementary School
- Duru Elementary School
- Eutteum Elementary School
- Gadeuk Elementary School
- Gamgam Elementary School
- Garak Elementary School
- Goun Elementary School
- Geulbot Elementary School
- Geumnam Elementary School
- Hangyeol Elementary School
- Hansol Elementary School
- Haemil Elementary School
  - By 2012, there was overcrowding at this school, so the Sejong City government chose to build new schools.
- Janggi Elementary School
- Jeondong Elementary School
- Jeonui Elementary School
- Jochiwon Daedong Elementary School
- Jochiwon Kyodong Elementary School
- Jochiwon Myeongdong Elementary School
- Jochiwon Sinbong Elementary School
- Kamsung Elementary School
- Keumnam Elementary School
- Mir Elementary School
- Narae Elementary School
- Naru Elementary School
- Naseong Elementary School
- Neulbom Elementary School
- Onbit Elementary School
- Sojeong Elementary School
- Solbit Elementary School
- Suwang Elementary School
- Ssangryu Elementary School
- Uirang Elementary School
- Yangji Elementary School
- Yonsei Elementary School
- Yeonbong Elementary School
- Yeondong Elementary School
- Yeongidowon Elementary School
- Yeonnam Elementary School
- Yeonseo Elementary School
- Yeoul Elementary School
- Yeongyang Elementary School

== Special Elementary Schools ==
- Nuri School
- 이음 School
