= Sŏnbong =

Sŏnbong (McCune–Reischauer spelling) or Seonbong (Revised Romanization spelling) may refer to:

- Sonbong-guyok (선봉구역), the subdivision of the North Korean city of Rason.
- Sŏnbong, the original name for the newspaper now known as Koryo Ilbo.
