= Hometown Village =

Sakhalin Korean enclave in South Korea

Hometown Village 고향마을
- Village
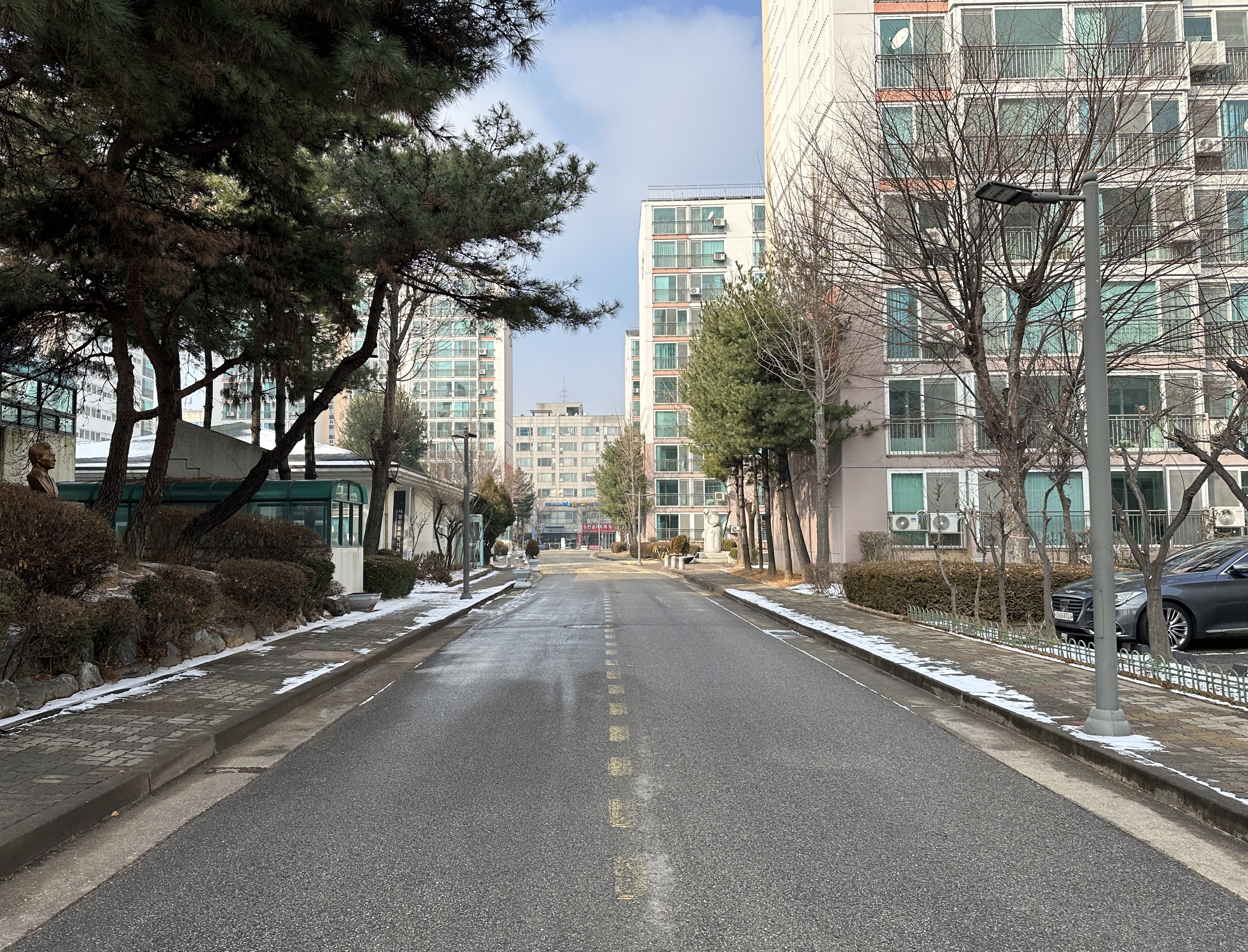
- Inside the enclave. The buildings to the left and right are part of the enclave. The building at the end of the road is an unrelated commercial building (2024)
- Interactive map of Hometown Village
- Coordinates: 37°18′24″N 126°51′11″E
- Country: South Korea
- Province: Gyeonggi
- City: Ansan
- District: Sangnok
- First move-ins: 2000

Area
  - Land: 2.352 ha (5.81 acres)

Population
  - Estimate (October 2023): 764

Hometown Village (Korean: 고향마을; Hanja: 故鄕마을; RR: Gohyang Maeul; Russian: Кохян Маыль) is a community of eight apartment buildings and enclave of Sakhalin Koreans at 39 Yonghagongwon-ro, Sangnok District, Ansan, South Korea. It is the largest enclave of Sakhalin Koreans in the country.

The community is composed of members of the return migration of the Korean diaspora. Settlement in the community began in 2000. As of October 2023, it housed 764 community members, primarily elderly.

== Background ==
Sakhalin Koreans are an ethnic group primarily based on the island of Sakhalin in Russia. They descend from populations of Koreans that were forced to move and labor under difficult conditions there during the Japanese colonial period, when the island was under Japanese control (then Karafuto Prefecture). After the end of the colonial period, the island was taken by the Soviet Union, which allowed the Sakhalin Koreans to return to communist North Korea, but due to the Asian Iron Curtain, those who hailed from South Korea were not allowed to leave. Moreover, the Soviet government was not keen on bringing the Koreans home, as the Sakhalin island needed a labor force. The Koreans were permitted to apply for Soviet citizenship, but many refused, wanting to go back to their homeland. A number of the first-generation Sakhalin Koreans maintained the hope for decades that they eventually would be allowed to return.

After the fall of the Soviet Union in the early 1990s, South Korea and Russia established diplomatic ties, and began offering Sakhalin Koreans the opportunity to move to South Korea. In 1993, the governments of South Korea and Japan negotiated the construction of an apartment complex for the returnees, and Japan paid 3.2 billion yen as reparations. In the 1990s and 2000s, more than 4,000 first-generation Sakhalin Koreans moved to South Korea. According to Viktoriya Bya (editor of Sakhalin's Korean-language newspaper), they wanted to go to their homeland to die. On the other hand, a significant number of non–first-generation Koreans had assimilated and wished to stay in Russia, and some of the returnees had to leave their families and friends behind.

In 2021, South Korea began allowing direct descendants of first-generation Sakhalin Koreans and their spouses to settle in South Korea. Most of them were motivated to move by economic factors.

== Description ==
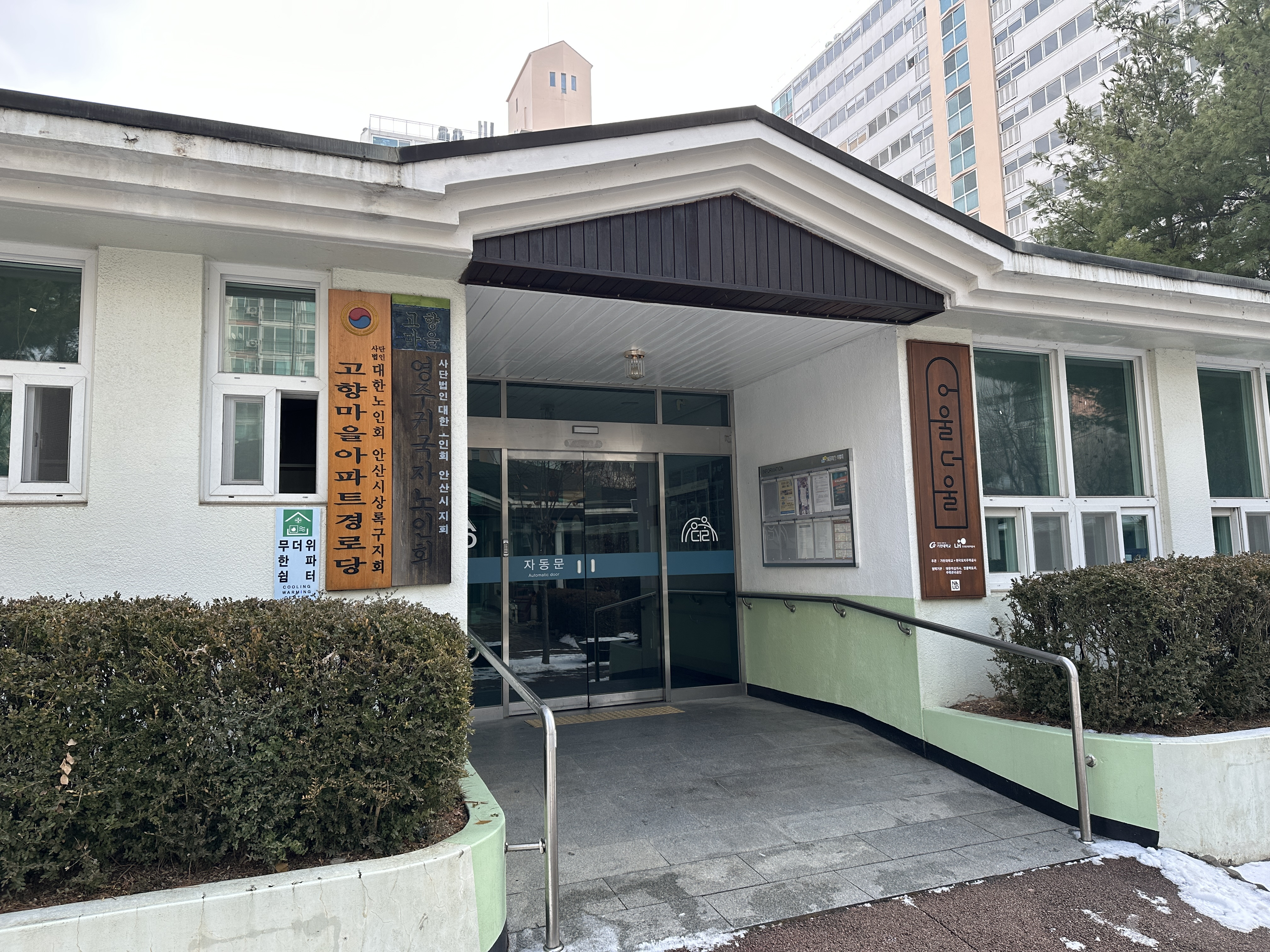
Community building (2024)

As the returnees to South Korea were mostly elderly, they were provided with accommodations functioning similar to nursing homes or retirement communities. Residents began moving into the complex in February 2000. The population peaked at 980 in 2000, with an average age of 78.6. Since then, the population has gradually declined due to aging and natural causes. By 2022, there were around 770 residents in eight different apartment buildings, each ten stories.

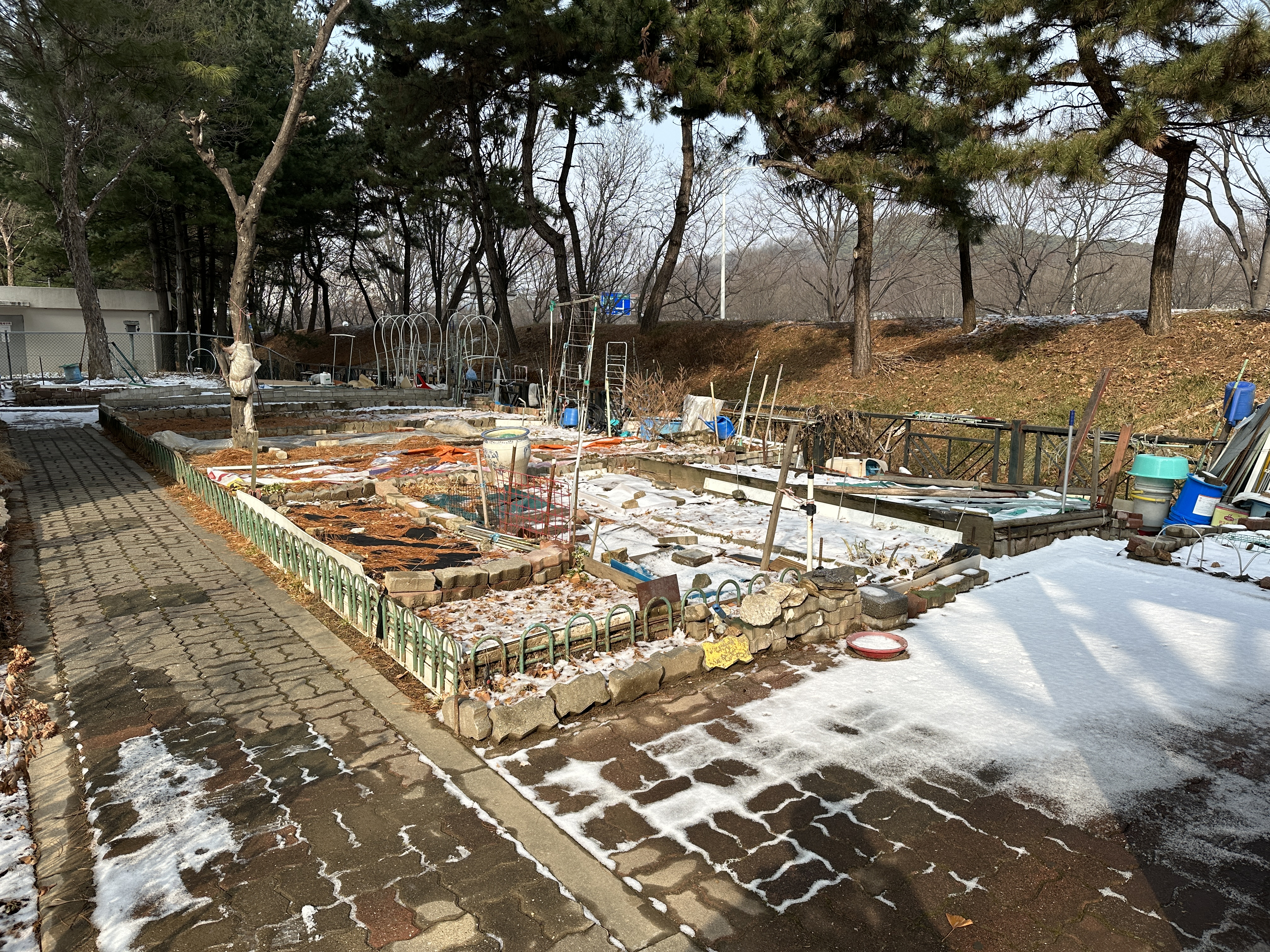
Garden plots for the residents (early 2024)

The Korean government provided housing on a 50-year public lease free-of-charge, and developed support systems to help navigate South Korean society. The residents has been given a pension, and responsible for paying their utilities and groceries cheques. In 2023, one resident stated that lunch was offered for free in the community center. Healthcare is readily available, with services provided by the South Korean and Japanese Red Cross, who also held classes on how to manage various common medical conditions, as well as Korean language classes. There is a local choir and dance group that have performed for the general public. There are spaces for playing mahjong, the Russian tile game lotto, table tennis, and karaoke.

=== Points of dissatisfaction ===
According to podcast 99% Invisible, while a significant portion of returnees has been grateful for the opportunity they were given to return and receive these services, there are still some points of dissatisfaction. Large number of residents only speak Russian or speak Korean dialects that are not easily understood by modern South Koreans, which has led to assimilation difficulties. Some find the experience bittersweet, knowing that by the time the repatriation occurred (beginning around 50 years after Korea was liberated in 1945), many first-generation Sakhalin Koreans had died without ever seeing their homeland again.

The separation between residents and those who has remained back in Sakhalin has caused emotional stress, which was intensified by travel restrictions during the COVID-19 pandemic. Some older residents live alone, which has led to feelings of isolation. While relatives could fly to South Korea to visit, this process was considered too expensive to afford frequently. As of 2023, South Korea only allowed one direct descendant and their nuclear family to move to South Korea, which has led to separated families. Furthermore, descendants who returned in this manner were not allowed to work, as they received a pension from the government. This has also been a point of contention.

== See also ==
- Ttaetgol Village – another return migration enclave in Ansan, for Koryo-saram
