= Sangnok District =

District of Ansan, South Korea

- Non-autonomous District
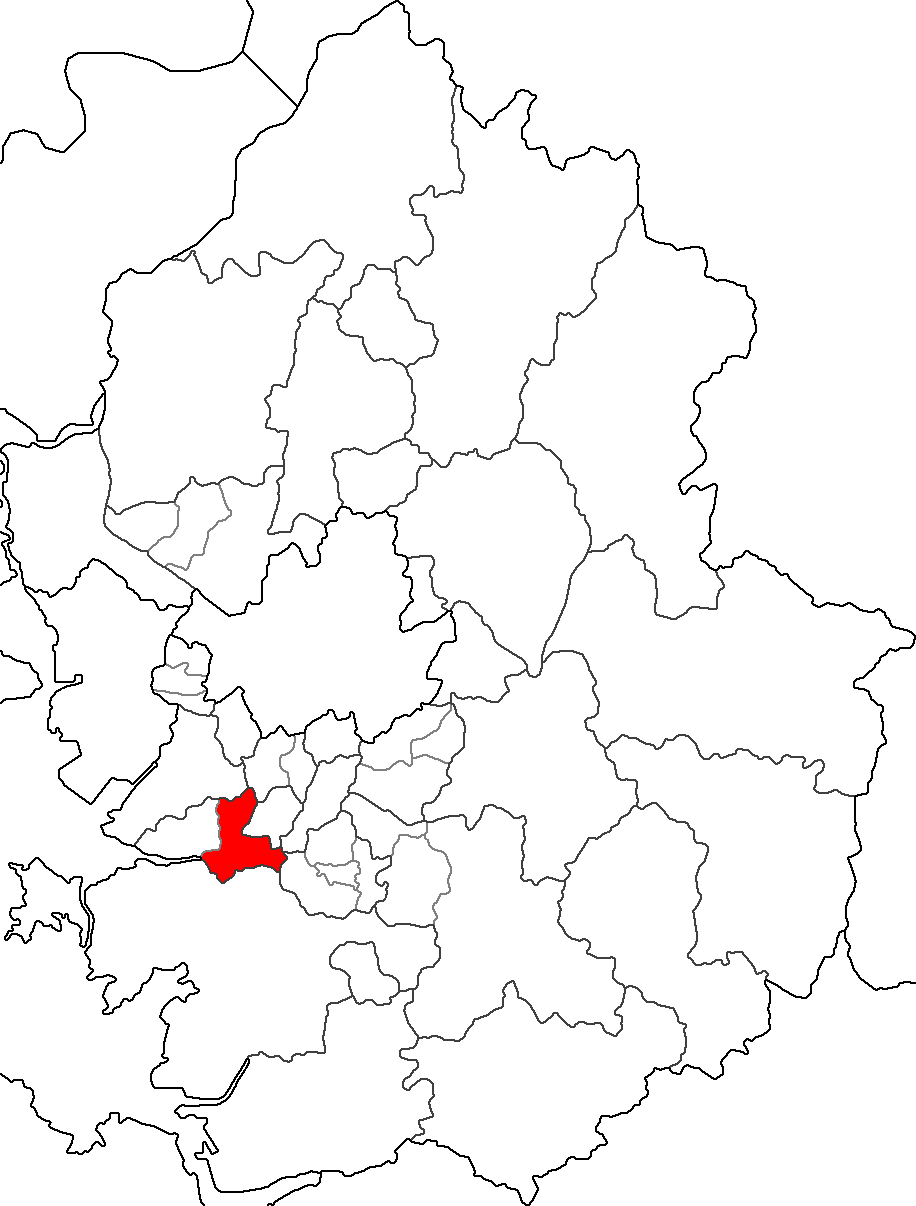
- Map of Gyeonggi Province highlighting Sangnok District
- Coordinates: 37°18′47″N 126°52′12″E
- Country: South Korea
- Region: Sudogwon (Gijeon)
- Province: Gyeonggi
- City: Ansan
- Administrative divisions: 13 dong

Area
  - Total: 57.89 km^{2} (22.35 sq mi)

Population (July 31, 2013)
  - Total: 390,011
  - Density: 6,737/km^{2} (17,450/sq mi)
  - Dialect: Seoul
- Website: Sangnok-gu Office

Korean name
- Hangul: 상록구
- Hanja: 常綠區
- RR: Sangnok-gu
- MR: Sangnok-ku

Sangnok District (Korean: 상록구) is a district of the city of Ansan, Gyeonggi Province, South Korea. The name "Sangnok" is came from the name of famous Korean novel Sangnoksu (meaning "evergreens"), written by Sim Hoon in 1936.

== Administrative divisions ==
Sangnok District is divided into the following dongs:

Name	Hangul	Hanja	Population	Households	Area (km^{2})
Il-dong	일동	一洞	28,147	11,531	2.41
I-dong	이동	二洞	31,063	14,177	2.44
Sa 1-dong	사 1동	四洞	39,482	16,991	2.36
Sa 2-dong	사 2동	四洞	36,509	12,734	3.65
Sa 3-dong	사 3동	四洞	21,469	7,151	3.68
Bono 1-dong	본오 1동	本五洞	44,140	17,914	6.45
Bono 2-dong	본오 2동	本五洞	32,562	12,062	0.82
Bono 3-dong	본오 3동	本五洞	25,344	9,948	1.10
Bugok-dong	부곡동	釜谷洞	23,339	9,059	6.22
Wolpi-dong	월피동	月陂洞	46,754	17,586	5.54
Seongpo-dong	성포동	聲浦洞	29,837	9,662	1.70
Banwol-dong	반월동	半月洞	21,280	8,047	13.16
Ansan-dong	안산동	安山洞	10,085	3,943	8.36

== See also ==
- Ansan
- Danwon District
