= Il-dong =

Neighborhood in Ansan, South Korea

Coordinates: 37.3103°N 126.8662°E

- Hangul: 일동
- Hanja: 一洞
- RR: Il-dong
- MR: Il-tong

Il-dong (Korean: 일동) is a dong (neighborhood) of Sangnok District, Ansan, Gyeonggi Province, South Korea.
