= Sakhalin State University =

University in Russia

- Сахалинский государственный университет (Russian)
- Type: Public research
- Established: 1949
- Location: 33 Komunistichesky Prospekt, Yuzhno-Sakhalinsk, Russia; 46°58′08″N 142°44′05″E Building details
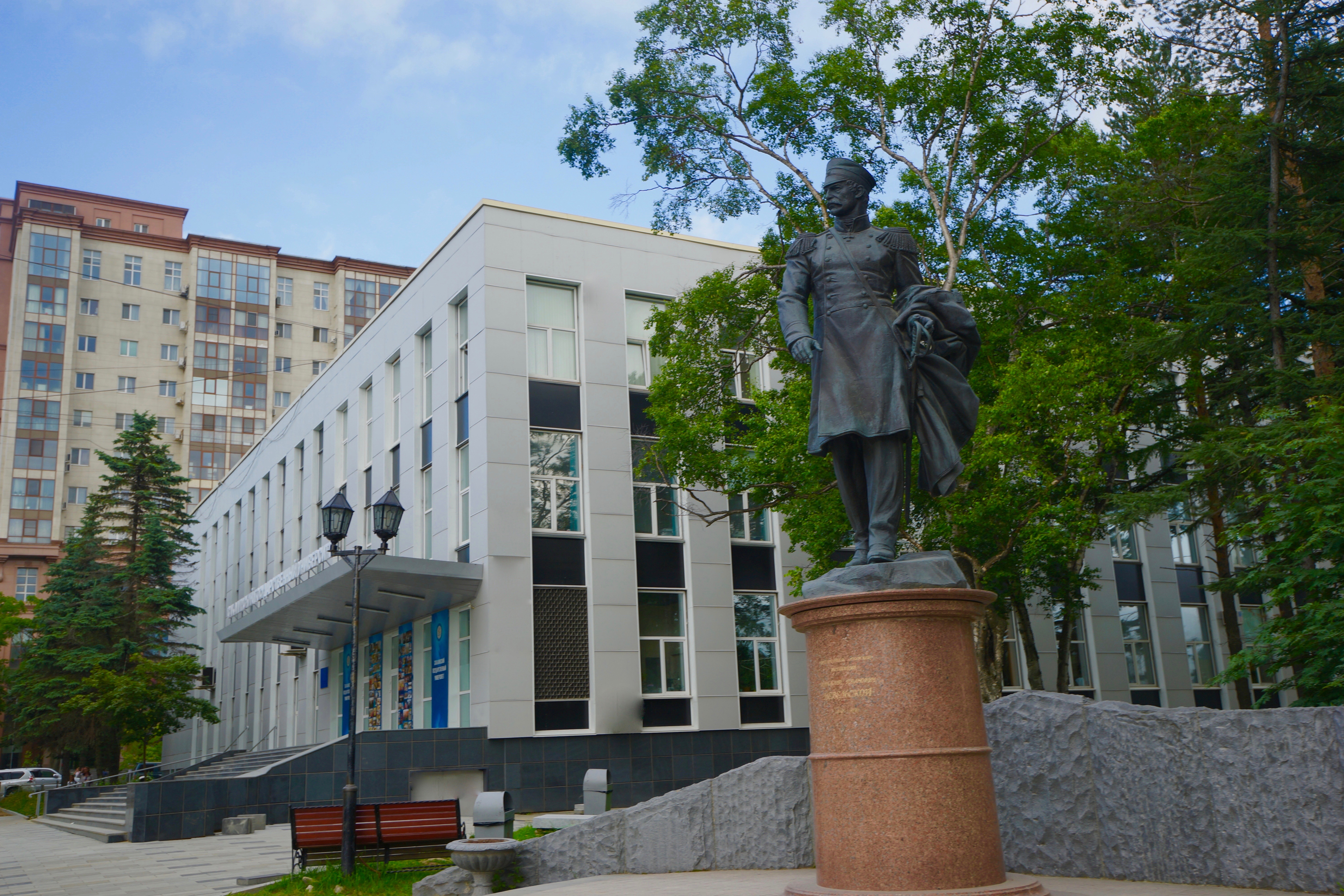
- Campus: Urban
- Website: sakhgu.ru

Sakhalin State University (Russian: Сахалинский государственный университет/tr: Sakhalinskiy gosudarstvenn'iy universitet) is a university located in Yuzhno-Sakhalinsk, Sakhalin. It maintains a sister school relationship with Busan University of Foreign Studies and Dongseo University of the Republic of Korea. As a result of this relationship and the large population of local Sakhalin Koreans, students from Korea form the majority of international students at Sakhalin State University.
