= Seoul Kyodong Elementary School =

Oldest modern elementary school in Korea

Kyodong Elementary School (Korean: 서울교동초등학교) is the oldest modern elementary school in South Korea, which was opened nearby the Gyeongbokgung palace in 1894. The first name of the school was the Royal Kyodong School, but later named as Kyodong Normal School. The school introduced women education in 1925. Nowadays according to the suburbanization of Seoul old city, it has around a hundred students.

== Alumni ==
President Yun Posun, Novelist Sim Hun, and Musician Yun Geuk-young graduated the school.
