= Ansan-dong, Ansan =

Neighborhood in Sangnok District, South Korea

Coordinates: 37°11′N 126°53′E

- Hangul: 안산동
- Hanja: 安山洞
- RR: Ansan-dong
- MR: Ansan-dong

Ansan-dong (Korean: 안산동) is a neighbourhood of Sangnok District, Ansan, Gyeonggi Province, South Korea.
