= I-dong, Ansan =

Neighborhood in Ansan, South Korea

Coordinates: 37°18′24″N 126°51′18″E

- Hangul: 이동
- Hanja: 二洞
- RR: I-dong
- MR: I-dong

I-dong (Korean: 이동) is a dong (neighborhood) of Sangnok District, Ansan, Gyeonggi Province, South Korea.
