= Sakhalin Koreans =

Ethnic community in Russia

Total population
- Over 55,000

Regions with significant populations
- Russia: 35,000
- Sakhalin Oblast: 24,993
- South Korea: 1,500
- North Korea: 1,000

Languages
- Russian, Korean

Religion
- Christianity (Russian Orthodoxy and Protestantism)

Related ethnic groups
- Korean diaspora, Koreans in Japan, Koryo-saram

Sakhalin Koreans

Korean name
- Hangul: 사할린 한인
- Hanja: 사할린 韓人
Transcriptions
- Revised Romanization: Sahallin Hanin

Japanese name
- Kanji: サハリン残留韓国人
- Kana: サハリンざんりゅうかんこくじん
Transcriptions
- Romanization: Saharin Zanryū Kankokujin

Russian name
- Russian: Сахалинские корейцы or Корейцы Сахалина
- Romanization: Sakhalinskie Koreytsi or Koreytsi Sakhalina

Sakhalin Koreans (Korean: 사할린 한인; Russian: Сахалинские корейцы, romanized: Sakhalinskiye koreytsy) are Russian citizens and residents of Korean descent living on Sakhalin Island, who can trace their roots to the immigrants from the Gyeongsang and Jeolla provinces of Korea during the late 1930s and early 1940s, the latter half of the Japanese colonial era.

At the time, the southern half of Sakhalin Island, then known as Karafuto Prefecture, was under the control of the Empire of Japan, whereas the northern half was part of the Soviet Union. The Japanese government both recruited and forced Korean labourers into service and shipped them to Karafuto to fill labour shortages resulting from World War II. The Red Army invaded Karafuto days before Japan's surrender; while all but a few Japanese there repatriated successfully, almost one-third of the Koreans could not secure permission to depart either to Japan or their home towns in South Korea. For the next forty years, they lived in exile. In 1985, the Japanese government offered transit rights and funding for the repatriation of the original group of Sakhalin Koreans; however, only 1,500 of them returned to South Korea in the next two decades. The vast majority of Koreans of all generations chose instead to stay on Sakhalin. Beginning in 2000, Hometown Village, a retirement community for first generation Sakhalins, has operated in Ansan.

Due to differing language and immigration history, Sakhalin Koreans may or may not identify themselves as Koryo-saram. The term Koryo-saram may be used to encompass all Koreans in the former USSR, but typically refers to ethnic Koreans from Hamgyŏng province whose ancestors emigrated to the Russian Far East in the 19th century, and then were later deported to Central Asia. The issue of self-identification is complicated by the fact that many Sakhalin Koreans feel that Koreans from Central Asia look down on them.

== History ==
=== Between Japan and Russia ===
==== Origins ====
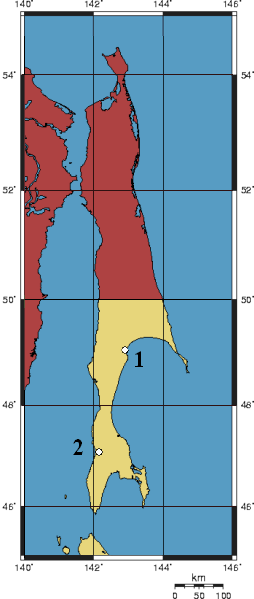
Approximate locations of the massacres 1: Shikuka, near Kamishisuka (上敷香) 2: Maoka, near Mizuho Village (瑞穂村) Soviet Union Empire of Japan

The earliest record of Koreans living on Sakhalin comes from the Russian Empire census of 1897, which lists 67 Koreans residing on the island. Some were prisoners belonging to the island's penal colony. Sakhalin would later be invaded during the Russo-Japanese War, and its southern half would be annexed by Japan in 1905. Five years later, the Korean peninsula would also be annexed by Japan.

In the 1910s, the Mitsui Group began recruiting labourers from the peninsula for their mining operations. In 1920, there were fewer than one thousand Koreans in the whole of Karafuto Prefecture, overwhelmingly male. The Russian Revolution of 1917 resulted in an influx of refugees from the Maritimes, who escaped to Karafuto. There would be over a thousand Koreans who were present during the Japanese occupation of northern Sakhalin. With some being hired by Mitsubishi's mining division to work in coal mines. At least 330 Koreans who worked in northern Sakhalin would resettle in Karafuto after 1925, and 487 would remain in the north. By the late 1920s, the Koreans of Soviet Sakhalin would have Korean language schools in Okha and Rybnovsk, with their population rising to 3,000 by 1932.

Nonetheless, the Korean population in Sakhalin remained relatively small. As late as the mid-1930s, there were fewer than 6,000 Koreans in Karafuto prefecture.

The Imperial Japanese Army in Karafuto frequently used local ethnic minorities (Oroks, Nivkhs, and Ainu) to conduct intelligence-gathering activities, because, as indigenous inhabitants, their presence would not arouse suspicion on the Soviet half of the island. Ethnic Koreans could also be found on both sides of the border, but the use of Koreans as spies was not common, as the Karafuto police were wary of the support for the independence movement among Koreans. Soviet suspicion towards Korean nationalism, along with fears that the Korean community might harbor Japanese spies, led to the 1937 deportation of Koreans from Soviet-controlled northern Sakhalin and the Russian Far East, to Central Asia.

In 1937, the deportation of Soviet Koreans to Central Asia resulted in the displacement of 1,155 Koreans from Sakhalin. Some 2,000 Koreans remained in northern Sakhalin, primarily working for the North Sakhalin Oil Company. Contradicting the USSR's stated aim for the deportations, Japan was allowed to bring in additional workers with Soviet permission. These oil facilities operated until 1943.

The enactment of 1938's State General Mobilization Law resulted in the mobilization and forced migration of Korean laborers. The Japanese government sought to increase the population of the sparsely populated prefecture. In order to ensure their control of southern Sakhalin, and fill the increasing demands of the coal mines and lumber yards. This mobilization can be separated into three phases: One of semi-forced mobilization from September 1939 to February 1942 driven by private concerns. State-organized recruitment due to the Pacific War from February 1942 to September 1944. Then completely forced "labor duty" from September 1944 to August 1945. At one point, over 150,000 Koreans were relocated to work on the island. Of those, around 10,000 miners were relocated to work in Ibaraki and Kyushu's mines prior to the war's end. Present-day Sakhalin Koreans' efforts to locate them proved futile.

==== Soviet invasion and Japanese massacres ====
The Soviet Union invaded the Japanese portion of Sakhalin on 11 August 1945 during the Soviet–Japanese War towards the end of World War II. In the confusion that ensued, a rumour began to spread that ethnic Koreans could be serving as spies for the Soviet Union, and led to massacres of Koreans by Japanese police and civilians. Despite the generally limited amount of information about the massacres, two examples of massacres are comparatively well-known today: the incident in Kamishisuka (now Leonidovo) on 18 August 1945, and the incident in Mizuho Village (now Pozharskoye), which lasted from 20 to 23 August 1945.

In Kamishisuka, the Japanese police arrested 19 Koreans on charges of spy activities; 18 were found shot within the police station the next day. The sole survivor, a Korean known only by his Japanese name Nakata, had survived by hiding in a toilet; he later offered testimony about the event. In Mizuho Village, Japanese fleeing Soviet troops who had landed at Maoka (now Kholmsk) claimed that the Koreans were cooperating with the Red Army and that they were pillaging Japanese property. Though Koreans and Japanese worked alongside each other in the village on farms and construction projects, the Japanese civilians turned against their Korean neighbors, killing 27 between 20 and 23 August. Other individual Koreans may have been killed to cover up evidence of Japanese atrocities committed during the evacuation: one woman interviewed by a US-Russian joint commission investigating the issue of Allied prisoners of war held by the Imperial Japanese Army in camps on Sakhalin reported that her ethnic Korean lover had been murdered by Japanese troops after he had witnessed mass shootings of hundreds of American prisoners of war.

=== Integration into the Soviet Union ===
==== Repatriation refused ====
In the years after the Soviet invasion, most of the 400,000 Japanese civilians who had not already been evacuated during the war left voluntarily under the auspices of the US-USSR Agreement on Repatriation of those left in the USSR, signed in December 1946. Many of the 150,000 Koreans on the island safely returned to mainland Japan, and some went to the northern half of the Korean peninsula; however, roughly 43,000 were not accepted for repatriation by Japan, and also could not be repatriated to the southern half of the Korean peninsula due to the political situation. The Soviet government initially had drawn up plans to repatriate the Koreans along with the Japanese, but the local administration on Sakhalin objected, arguing that incoming Russians from the mainland would not be sufficient to replace the skilled labourers who had already departed. The indecision about the ultimate fate of the Sakhalin Koreans persisted until the outbreak of the Korean War, after which repatriation became a political impossibility.

One interviewee in 2016 shared her family's experience:

When our family moved from Uglegorsk to Korsakov in the late 1940s, every morning my parents rushed to the coast of Korsakov to see and welcome passenger ships coming from South Korea. They were always convinced that those ships would carry them to their homeland. The ships that they eagerly expected [to take them home] did not show up after all, making [them] sob bitterly and go away in tears.

Some sources claim Stalin himself blocked their departure because he wanted to retain them as coal miners on the island. In 1957, Seoul appealed for Tokyo's assistance to secure the departure of ethnic Koreans from Sakhalin via Japan, but Tokyo took no real action on the request, and blamed Soviet intransigence for the lack of progress in resolving the issue; Japan continued its earlier policy of granting entrance only to Sakhalin Koreans who were married to Japanese citizens, or had a Japanese parent.

During the late 1940s, the ranks of ethnic Koreans on the island were augmented by another 8,000 North Korean expatriates, recruited by the Soviet government to work in state-owned fisheries.

In an effort to integrate the Korean labourers, who were unfamiliar with the Soviet system and unable to speak Russian, local authorities set up schools using the Korean language as the medium of instruction. However, the Sakhalin Koreans were believed to have been "infected with the Japanese spirit", and so for the most part the authorities did not trust them to run any of their own collective farms, mills, factories, schools, or hospitals. Instead, these tasks were left to several hundred ethnic Koreans imported from Central Asia, who were bilingual in Russian and Korean. Resentment towards the social dominance of Koreans from Central Asia over the Sakhalin Koreans led to tensions between the two groups; the latter developed a number of disparaging terms in Korean to refer to the former. (Note: For example, K'ŭnttangbaegi (큰땅배기; lit. 'continental people').)

The Sakhalin government's policy towards the Sakhalin Koreans continued to shift in line with bilateral relations between North Korea and the Soviet Union. During the 1950s, North Korea demanded that the Soviets treat Sakhalin Koreans as North Korean citizens, and, through their consulate, even set up study groups and other educational facilities for them (analogous to Chongryon's similar, more successful efforts among the Zainichi Koreans). During the late 1950s, it became increasingly difficult for the Sakhalin Koreans to obtain Soviet citizenship, and a growing proportion chose instead to become North Korean citizens rather than to deal with the burdens of remaining stateless, which included severe restrictions on their freedom of movement and the requirement to apply for permission from the local government in order to travel outside of Sakhalin. As of 1960, only 25% had been able to secure Soviet citizenship; 65% had declared North Korean citizenship, with the remaining 10% choosing to remain unaffiliated despite the difficulties this entailed. However, as relations between the Soviet Union and North Korea deteriorated, the authorities acted to de-emphasise Korean language education and reduce the influence of North Korea within the community; by the early 1970s, Sakhalin Koreans were once again encouraged to apply for Soviet citizenship.

==== Attention from the outside world ====
In the late 1960s and early 1970s, the situation of the Sakhalin Koreans improved as the outside world began to pay much more attention to their situation. Starting in 1966, Park No Hak, a former Sakhalin Korean who had earlier received permission to leave Sakhalin and settle in Japan due to having a Japanese wife, petitioned the Japanese government a total of 23 times to discuss the issue of the Sakhalin Koreans with the Soviet government.

His actions inspired 500,000 South Koreans to form an organisation to work towards the repatriation of their co-ethnics; in response, the South Korean began radio broadcasts targeted at the Sakhalin Koreans, in an effort to assure them that they had not been forgotten. The South Korean government was hesitant to directly accept Sakhalin Koreans as refugees. They questioned the loyalty of residents from an Eastern Bloc country, and preferred them to transit through Japan first if possible.

At the same time, Rei Mihara, a Tokyo housewife, formed a similar pressure group in Japan, and 18 Japanese lawyers attempted to sue the Japanese government to force them to accept diplomatic and financial responsibility for the transportation of the Sakhalin Koreans and their return to South Korea.

Additionally, the Soviet government finally began to permit the Sakhalin Koreans to naturalize. However, as many as 10% continued to refuse both Soviet and North Korean citizenship and demanded repatriation to South Korea. By 1976, only 2,000 more of their population had been able to obtain permission to depart from Sakhalin, but that year, the Sakhalin government made a public announcement that people seeking to emigrate to South Korea could simply show up at the Immigration Office to file an application. Within a week, they had received more than 800 such applications, including some from North Korean citizens; this caused the North Korean embassy to complain to their Soviet counterparts about the new emigration policy.

Ultimately, Soviet authorities chose for unspecified reasons to refuse to issue exit visas to most of those concerned, leading to the unusual case of public demonstrations about the refusals by Korean families. This level of open dissent provoked the authorities to completely reverse their liberalising stance towards the Sakhalin Koreans; they arrested more than 40 protestors, and in November 1976 deported them, but to North Korea rather than to the South as they desired. Further purges and intimidation of those seeking to emigrate also followed. Through to the early 1980s, locally born Korean youth, increasingly interested in their heritage, were seen as traitors by their Russian neighbours for wanting to know more about their ancestral land and for seeking to emigrate. The nadir of ethnic relations came after the 1983 shooting-down of Korean Air Lines Flight 007 by the Soviet Union.

=== Perestroika, glasnost, and the post-Soviet period ===
==== Improving relations with Japan ====
In 1985, Japan agreed to approve transit rights and fund the repatriation of the first generation of Sakhalin Koreans; the Soviet Union also began to liberalize their emigration laws in 1987. As of 2001, Japan spends US$1.2 million a year to fund Sakhalin Koreans' visits to Seoul. The Foreign Ministry allocated about $5 million to build a cultural centre in Sakhalin, which was intended to feature a library, an exhibition hall, Korean language classrooms, and other facilities, but as of 2004, the project had not begun, causing protests among the Sakhalin Koreans.

On 18 April 1990, Taro Nakayama, Japan's Minister for Foreign Affairs, stated:

"Japan is deeply sorry for the tragedy in which these (Korean) people were moved to Sakhalin not of their own free will but by the design of the Japanese government and had to remain there after the conclusion of the war".

The foreign trade of Sakhalin with Japan is still roughly four times that with Korea, and Japanese companies greatly outnumber their Korean counterparts on the island. As a result, while members of the first generation still carry anti-Japanese sentiment, the younger generations have developed an interest in Japanese culture and have taken up the study of the Japanese language, much to the consternation of their elders. On 28 October 2006, a Korean student from the Sakhalin State University placed second in the All-CIS Japanese Language Students Competition.

==== North and South Korean influence ====
During the 1990s, commerce, communication, and direct flights opened up between Sakhalin and South Korea, and the two Koreas began to vie openly for influence among the Sakhalin Koreans. Television and radio programmes from both North and South Korea, as well as local programming, began to be broadcast on Sakhalin Korean Broadcasting, the only Korean television station in all of Russia. North Korea negotiated with Russia for closer economic relations with Sakhalin, and sponsored an art show in Yuzhno-Sakhalinsk in 2006. They have also permitted delegations of Sakhalin Koreans to visit relatives in North Korea. Scholarly studies suggest that roughly 1,000 Sakhalin Koreans have opted to repatriate to North Korea, but the rise of the South Korean economy combined with the ongoing economic and political turmoil in the North have made this option less attractive. Sakhalin Koreans have also provided assistance to refugees fleeing North Korea, either those who illegally escaped across the border, or those who escaped North Korean labour camps in Russia itself.

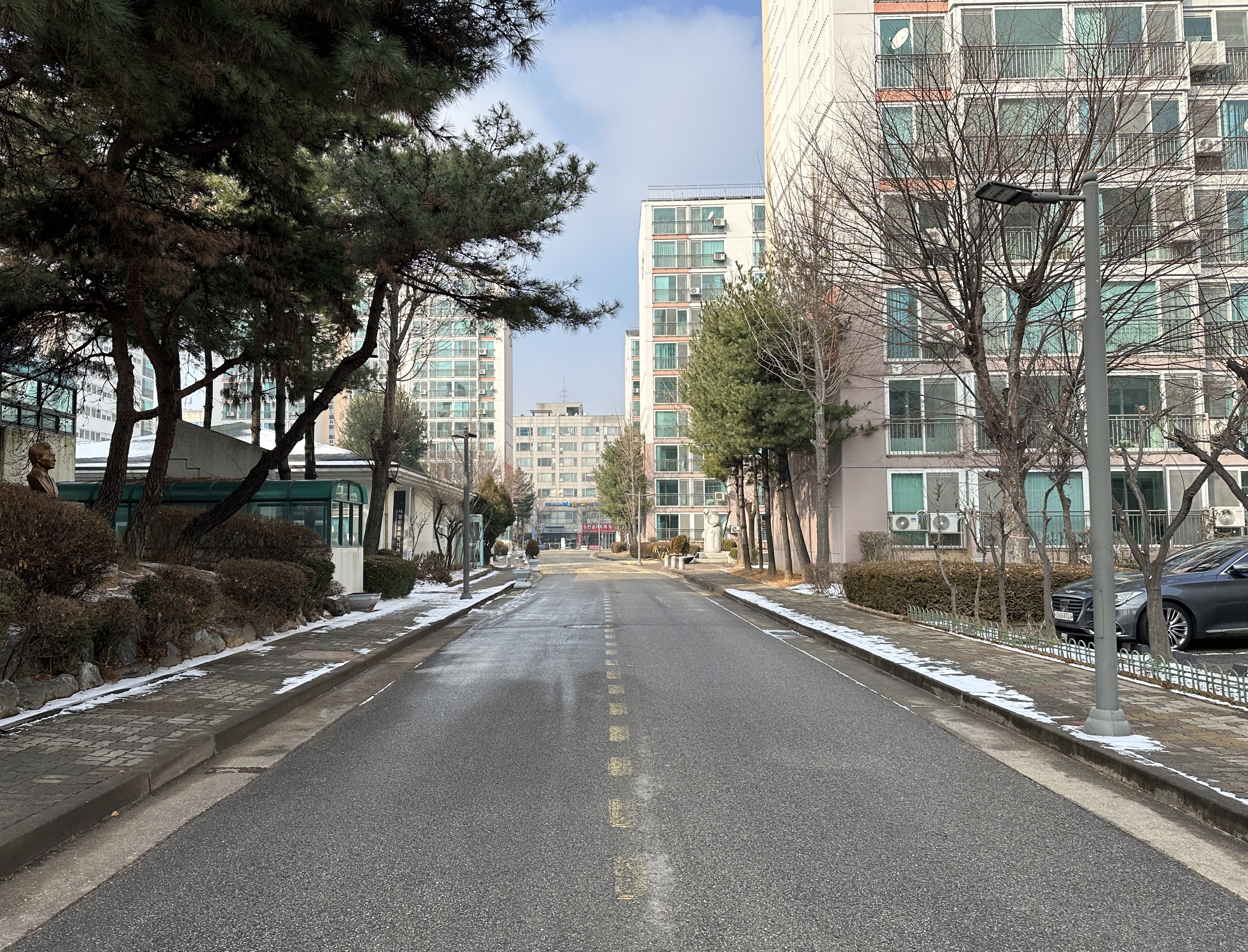
Apartments of Hometown Village (2024)

South Korea and Japan jointly funded the building of Hometown Village, a retirement community under the auspices of the Korean Red Cross for elderly Sakhalin Koreans, in Ansan. By the end of 2002, 1,544 people had settled there and in other locations, while another 14,122 had travelled to South Korea on short-term visits at the expense of the Japanese government. South Korean investors also began to participate in the international tenders for works contracts to develop the Sakhalin Shelf, as they are interested in the potential supply of liquefied natural gas. By the year 2000, South Korean missionaries had opened several churches, and South Koreans comprised the majority of international students at the Sakhalin State University. The Korean Association of Sakhalin, an ethnic representative body, is generally described as being pro-South Korean, analogous to Japan's Mindan. In addition to the elderly, a few younger Koreans have also chosen to move to South Korea, either to find their roots, or for economic reasons, as wages in South Korea are as much as three times those in Sakhalin. However, upon arrival, they often find that they are viewed as foreigners by the South Korean locals, despite their previous exposure to Korean culture in Sakhalin. As one returnee put it, "Sakhalin Koreans live in a different world than Sakhalin Russians but that world isn’t Korea". In general, younger Sakhalin Koreans, especially those lacking fluency in the Korean language, prefer to stay on Sakhalin. Of the 1,544 Koreans who repatriated to South Korea as of 2005, nearly 10% eventually returned to Sakhalin. Conversely, some foreign students from Korea studying in Sakhalin also reported difficulties in befriending local Koreans, claiming that the latter looked down on them for being foreigners.

==== Local interethnic relations ====
In the late 1980s, suspicions against the Sakhalin Koreans remained. With the relaxation of internal migration controls and the dissolution of the Soviet Union, Russians began moving en masse back to the mainland, making ethnic Koreans an increasing proportion of the population; there were fears that they might become a majority of the island's population, and seek an autonomous republic or even independence. However, the rise of the regional economy and the cultural assimilation of the younger generations drove more than 95% of Koreans to stay in Sakhalin or move to the Russian Far East rather than leave for South Korea, as they have come to consider Russia their home country. The Sakhalin Koreans' family connections in South Korea have benefited even those who remained on Sakhalin with easier access to South Korean business and imports; trade with South Korea has brought the Sakhalin Koreans a better economic standing than the average resident of Sakhalin. By 2004, inter-ethnic relations between Russians and Koreans had improved greatly and were generally not described as being a problem on Sakhalin. However, Sakhalin Koreans who have travelled to the mainland of Russia, or have relocated to there (a population of roughly 10,000), report that they have encountered various forms of racism.

Among the Koreans who remain on Sakhalin, roughly 7,000 of the original generation of settlers survive, while their locally born descendants make up the rest of the local Korean population. They are highly urbanized; half live in the administrative centre of Yuzhno-Sakhalinsk, where Koreans constitute nearly 12% of the population. Around thirty per cent of Sakhalin's thirty thousand Koreans still have not taken Russian citizenship. Unlike ethnic Russians or other local minority groups, Sakhalin Koreans are exempted from conscription, but there have been calls for this exemption to be terminated.

== Culture ==
=== Personal and family names ===
Korean surnames in Romanization/Cyrillization
Korean (RR)			Russian (BGN)		Alternative English Spellings
안	安	An	Ан	An	Ahn
배	裵	Bae	Бя; Пягай	Bya; Pyagay	Pae
백	白	Baek	Пэк; Пяк	P∙ek; Pyak	Baik; Paek
박	朴	Bak	Пак	Pak	Park
반	潘	Ban	Пан	Pan	Pahn
방	方 房	Bang	Пан	Pan	Pang; Phang
부	夫 傅	Bu	Пу; Пугай	Pu; Pugay	Booh; Pooh
변	卞 邊	Byeon	Пён	Pyon	Pyoun
차	車	Cha	Ча; Чагай	Cha; Chagay	Char; Tchah
채	蔡	Chae	Цай	Tsay	Chai
천	千	Cheon	Чен	Chen	Choun
최	崔	Choe	Цой; Цхай; Цхой	Tsoy; Tskhay; Tskhoy	Choi; Chey; Choy
엄	嚴	Eom	Эм	Em	Oum
강	姜 康 强 彊 剛	Gang	Кан	Kan	Kang
김	金	Gim	Ким	Kim	Kim
고	高	Go	Ко; Когай	Ko; Kogay	Koh
구	具	Gu	Ку	Ku	Koo
곽	郭	Gwak	Квак	Kvak	Kwak
권	權	Gwon	Кван; Квон	Kvan; Kvon	Kwon
한	韓	Han	Хан	Khan	Hahn
허	許	Heo	Хе; Хегай	Khe; Khegay; Khegai	Huh; Hur
홍	洪	Hong	Хон	Khon	Houng
황	黃	Hwang	Хван	Khvan	Hwang
현	玄	Hyeon	Хён	Khyon	Hyoun
이 리	李	I Ri	И Ли; Лигай; Ни; Нигай	I Li; Ligay; Ni; Nigay	Lee; Rhee; Yi
임 림	林	Im; Rim	Им; Лим	Im; Lim	Rhim; Yim
인	印	In	Ин	In	Yin
장	張	Jang	Тян; Чан	Tyan; Chan	Chang; Jang
전	全 田	Jeon	Тен	Ten	Chun; Jun
정	鄭 丁	Jeong	Тен; Чжен	Ten; Chzhen	Chung; Tseung
지	池 智	Ji	Ти; Тигай	Ti; Tigay	Chi; Jee
진	陳	Jin	Чен	Chen	Chin
조	趙 曺	Jo	Дё; Тё	Dyo; Tyo	Cho
주	朱 周	Ju	Дю; Дюгай; Дзю; Тюгай; Цзю	Dyu; Dyugay; Dzyu; Tyugay; Tszyu	Chu
마	馬 麻	Ma	Ма; Магай	Ma; Magay	Mar; Mha
맹	孟	Maeng	Мян	Myan	Maeing
민	閔	Min	Мин	Min	Mhin
문	門 文	Mun	Мун	Mun	Moon
명	明	Myeong	Мён	Myon	Myoung
나 라	羅	Na; Ra	На; Ра	Na; Ra	La; Rha
남	南	Nam	Нам	Nam	Nahm
노 로	盧 魯 路	No; Ro	Но; Ногай; Ро	No; Nogay; Ro	Nho; Noh; Rho
오	伍 吳	O	О Огай	O Ogay	Au; Oe; Oh
유	兪 劉	Yu	Ю Югай	Yu; Yugay	Yoo; You
류	柳	Ryu	Ю Югай, Люгай	Yu; Yugay, Lyugay	Ryoo; Ryou
서	徐	Seo	Ше; Шегай	She; Shegay	So; Sur
석	石 昔	Seok	Шек	Shek	Suk
설	薛 偰	Seol	Шер	Sher	Sol; Sull
성	成	Seong	Сен	Sen	Song
심	沈	Sim	Сим; Шим	Sim; Shim	Seem; Sheem
신	申 辛 愼	Sin	Син; Шин	Sin; Shin	Seen; Sheen
손	孫	Son	Сон	Son	Sohn
송	宋	Song	Сон	Son	Sung
태	太	Tae	Тхай; Тхя	Tkhay; Tkhya	Tai; Tay
우	禹	U	У Угай	U Ugay	Ou; Woo
왕	王	Wang	Ван	Van	(none)
원	元	Won	Вон	Von	Woon
양 량	梁	Yang; Ryang	Лян; Рян; Ян	Lyan; Ryan; Yan	Lyang; Ryang; Yaung
여 려	余 呂 汝	Yeo; Ryeo	Ё Ёгай	Yo; Yogay	Yea; Yo; Yu
염 렴	廉	Yeom; Ryeom	Ём; Лём	Yom; Lyom	Yeoum
연 련	延 燕 連	Yeon; Ryeon	Ён	Yon	Yeoun
윤	尹	Yun	Юн	Yun	Yoon

Korean surnames, when Cyrillized, may be spelled slightly differently from the romanisations used in English; the resulting common pronunciations also differ, as can be seen in the table at right. Furthermore, Korean naming practices and Russian naming practices conflict in several important ways. While most members of the older generations of Sakhalin Koreans used Korean names, members of the younger generations favor their Russian names. However, with the increasing exposure to South Korean pop culture, some younger Koreans have named their children after characters in Korean television dramas. The use of patronymics is not widespread.

In addition to Korean names, the oldest generation of Sakhalin Koreans are often legally registered under Japanese names, which they had originally adopted due to the sōshi-kaimei policy of the Japanese colonial era. After the Soviet invasion, the Sakhalin authorities conducted name registration for the local Koreans on the basis of the Japanese identity documents issued by the old Karafuto government; as of 2006, the Russian government uniformly refused requests for re-registration under Korean names.

=== Language ===
Due to their greater population density and expectation that they would one day be allowed to return to Korea, the Sakhalin Koreans have kept something of a sojourner mentality rather than a settler mentality, which influenced their relation to the surrounding society; even today, they tend to speak much better Korean than those who were deported to Central Asia. A weekly Korean language newspaper, the Se Korea Sinmun, has been published since 1949, while Sakhalin Korean Broadcasting began operation in 1956. Korean-language television programmes are broadcast locally, but typically with Russian subtitles. Additionally, during the Soviet era, Sakhalin Koreans were often hired to act as announcers and writers for official media aimed at the Koryo-saram in Central Asia. However, unlike the Koryo-saram, the spoken Korean of Sakhalin is not very closely related to Hamgyŏng dialect or Koryo-mar, but is instead descended from Jeolla and Gyeongsang dialects. As a result of the diplomatic situation up until the 1980s, during which South Korea had no relations with the Soviet Union, Korean-language instructional materials were provided by North Korea or developed domestically. As a result, Sakhalin Koreans uniquely write using the North Korean standard but speak in radio broadcasts in a manner that resembles the Seoul dialect of South Korea.

=== Religion ===
Since the dissolution of the Soviet Union, there has been significant growth in religious activities among the Sakhalin Koreans; the establishment of churches was noted in scholarly articles as early as 1990. Christian hymns have become popular listening material, supplementing the more typical Russian, Western, and Korean pop music. Korean churches also broadcast religious content through Sakhalin Korean Broadcasting; a Baptist church run by ethnic Koreans sponsors a journalist there. However, large-scale religious events can be subjected to restriction by the government authorities: in June 1998 the local Russian Orthodox Church and the regional administration of Sakhalin successfully pressured Korean Presbyterian missionaries to cancel a conference of more than 100 Presbyterian and other Protestant missionaries from around the former Soviet Union. Ethnic Koreans are numerous among the church-goers of St. James Cathedral, seat of the Apostolic Prefecture of Yuzhno Sakhalinsk, in Yuzhno-Sakhalinsk. Catholic missions in Kholmsk and Aniva have also a fair number of Korean parishioners.

=== Cuisine ===
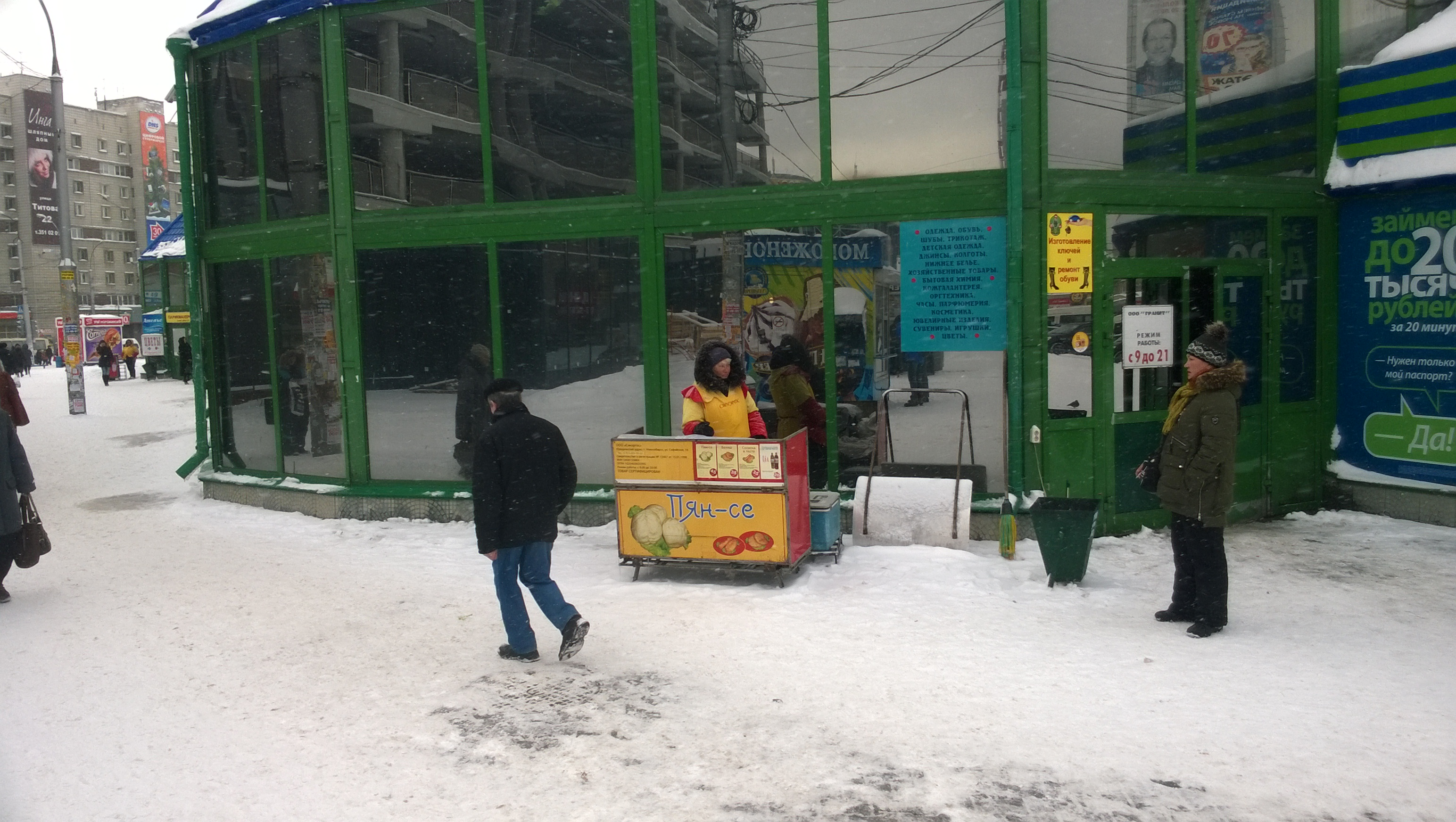
Pyanse being sold at a street cart in Novosibirsk, Russia (2015)

Sakhalin Koreans have a cuisine that is descended from Korean cuisine. Their food has not only significant popularity within Sakhalin, but also in Russia, with dishes like pyanse widely consumed in Moscow and Vladivostok. The cuisine is still widely and regularly consumed by the remaining Sakhalin Koreans on the island, as well as by the non-Korean Sakhalin Russians. A September 2012 survey found that 90% of Sakhalin Koreans and 63% of non-Koreans consume the food often.

=== Music ===
In one survey, a third of the Sakhalin Korean population expressed a preference for traditional Korean music, a far higher proportion than in any other ethnic Korean community surveyed. However, despite their better knowledge of Korean language, the same survey showed that Korean pop music is less widespread among Sakhalin Koreans than among ethnic Koreans in Kazakhstan, possessing about the same degree of popularity as in Uzbekistan. Sakhalin Koreans also reported listening to Western popular and classical music at much lower rates than Koreans in the rest of the former Soviet Union. Study of traditional Korean musical instruments has also been gaining popularity across all generations. The Ethnos Arts School was established in 1991 in Yuzhno-Sakhalinsk to teach children's classes in traditional Korean dance, piano, sight singing, and the gayageum, a zither-like instrument supposedly invented around the time of the Gaya confederacy.

== See also ==
- Russia–South Korea relations
- Russia-North Korea relations
- Chinese people in Russia
- Japanese people in Russia
- Russians in Korea
- Koryo-saram
- Korean diaspora
