= Se Korea Sinmun =

Korean newspaper in Sakhalin, Russia

Coordinates: 46.9569°N 142.7353°E

- 70th anniversary edition (May 31, 2019)
- President: Bae Sun-sin
- Founded: June 1, 1949
- Language: Korean, Russian
- Headquarters: Chehova St, 37, Yuzhno-Sakhalinsk, Sakhalin Oblast, Russia
- Website: cafe.naver.com/sekoreasinmun.cafe
- Free online archives: www.arirang.ru/archive/sks/content_sks.htm

The Se Korea Sinmun (Korean: 『새고려신문』; lit. New Goryeo Newspaper; Russian: Газета Сэ корё синмун or Новая корейская газета) is a weekly Korean- and Russian-language newspaper published for Sakhalin Koreans from Yuzhno-Sakhalinsk, Sakhalin Oblast, Russia. It was first published on June 1, 1949 as the Korean Worker (『조선로동자』), and later as On the Path of Lenin (『레닌의 길로』). It received its current name in 1991.

The newspaper was one of the few sources of Korean writing and literature in Sakhalin for decades. However, since the collapse of the Soviet Union in 1991, the newspaper has been experiencing financial difficulties, although it has still continued to operate as of 2023.

== History ==
The newspaper was originally founded on June 1, 1949 as the Korean Worker, and published from Khabarovsk. It was published for the mix of Sakhalin Korean and North Korean workers working in the area at the time. It published three times a week, with a circulation of 7,000 copies.

Around September 1950, the newspaper became directly managed by the Sakhalin government, and its operations were moved to Yuzhno-Sakhalinsk. Around that time it had a circulation of around 10,000 copies, and later increased circulation to 12,000 copies and five issues a week. On May 14, 1961, its name was changed to On the Path of Lenin. In 1964, the newspaper was temporarily shut down, and its archived copies burned.

Around the time of the collapse of the Soviet Union, on January 1, 1991, it changed its name to its current form. Around this time, it had a circulation of 10,000. As it was no longer strictly censored by the state, it began to more freely publish on politics and social issues. Around that time, it had 32 people on its staff. However, it stopped receiving the support of the local government, which caused financial difficulties. It reduced its publication frequency to once per week. In 2005, it appealed to South Koreans for donations to continue its operations. By 2009, it was receiving some help from the Sakhalin government and from an overseas Koreans foundation, but they still reported having financial difficulties. In addition, first generation Sakhalin Koreans began returning to the Korean peninsula to retire around this time. At first, the newspaper mailed issues to them, but the expenses became too much, so they opened a Naver blog to distribute the paper digitally.

The newspaper has played an active role in the Korean community and the preservation of the Korean language in the area. Its reporters held Korean-language classes. Its photographers have held exhibitions on Sakhalin Korean history at the Sakhalin Regional Museum. Some of its activities, including a literary contest, are supported by the South Korean Ministry of Unification.

In 2019, it celebrated its 70th anniversary. By that year, the paper was published from the building of the Sakhalin Oblast Duma, under the supervision of its president Bae Sun-sin (배순신), who has served since 2007. The newspaper published eight pages each week, with five pages in Korean and the others in Russian. Several of the Russian-language pages address topics on Korea and Korean culture.

In 2022, staff of the paper were recognized by the Sakhalin Governor Valery Limarenko for their reporting.

== See also ==
- Koryo Ilbo – a Korean-language newspaper for Koryo-saram, other Koreans of the former Soviet Union
