= Sa-dong, Ansan =

Neighbourhood in Ansan, South Korea

- Hangul: 사동
- Hanja: 四洞
- RR: Sa-dong
- MR: Sa-dong

Sa-dong (Korean: 사동) is a neighbourhood of Sangnok-gu, Ansan, Gyeonggi Province, South Korea. It is officially divided into Sa-1-dong, Sa-2-dong and Sa-3-dong.
