= Seongpo-dong =

Neighbourhood in Ansan, South Korea

- Hangul: 성포동
- Hanja: 聲浦洞
- RR: Seongpo-dong
- MR: Sŏngp'o-dong

Seongpo-dong (Korean: 성포동) is a neighbourhood of Sangnok-gu, Ansan, Gyeonggi Province, South Korea.
