= Bono-dong =

Neighborhood in Ansan, South Korea

- Hangul: 본오동
- Hanja: 本五洞
- RR: Bono-dong
- MR: Pono-dong

Bono-dong (Korean: 본오동) is a Dong (administrative division) (neighborhood) of Sangnok District, Ansan, Gyeonggi Province, South Korea. It is officially divided into Bono-1-dong, Bono-2-dong and Bono-3-dong.

Bono 1 is a provincial and agricultural area with Banwol Plating Complex. It is a multi-family housing complex with many residents. In Bono Garden, Bono rice is produced and supplied to local residents.

Bono 2 is a typical residential area, with about 3,700 apartment complexes in the west and multi-family houses on the east. In the south is the 'Gakgol' park.

Bongo 3 is a mixture of apartment complexes and commercial areas. Especially, this area is Seoul Subway Line 4, Sangroksu Station station area, which is a key point of traffic and has a lot of working people.
