= Wolpi-dong =

Neighbourhood in Ansan, South Korea

Coordinates: 37.34227°N 126.84894°E

- Hangul: 월피동
- Hanja: 月陂洞
- RR: Wolpi-dong
- MR: Wŏlp'i-dong

Wolpi-dong (Korean: 월피동) is a neighbourhood of Sangnok-gu, Ansan, Gyeonggi Province, South Korea.
