= Gunpo-dong =

- Hangul: 군포동
- Hanja: 軍浦洞
- RR: Gunpo-dong
- MR: Kunp'o-dong

Gunpo-dong (Korean: 군포동) is neighbourhood of Gunpo, Gyeonggi Province, South Korea. It is officially divided into Gunpo-1-dong and Gunpo-2-dong.
