= Banwol-dong, Ansan =

Neighborhood in Ansan, South Korea

Coordinates: 37°18′N 126°54′E

- Hangul: 반월동
- Hanja: 半月洞
- RR: Banwol-dong
- MR: Panwŏl-tong

Banwol-dong (Korean: 반월동) is a neighborhood of Sangnok District, Ansan, Gyeonggi Province, South Korea.
