= Bugok-dong, Ansan =

Neighborhood in Ansan, South Korea

Coordinates: 37°19′N 126°57′E

- Hangul: 부곡동
- Hanja: 釜谷洞
- RR: Bugok-dong
- MR: Pugok-tong

Bugok-dong (Korean: 부곡동) is a dong (neighborhood) of Sangnok District, Ansan, Gyeonggi Province, South Korea.
