= Bugok-dong, Uiwang =

Coordinates: 37°19′14.5″N 126°57′18.8″E

- Hangul: 부곡동
- Hanja: 富谷洞
- RR: Bugok-dong
- MR: Pugok-tong

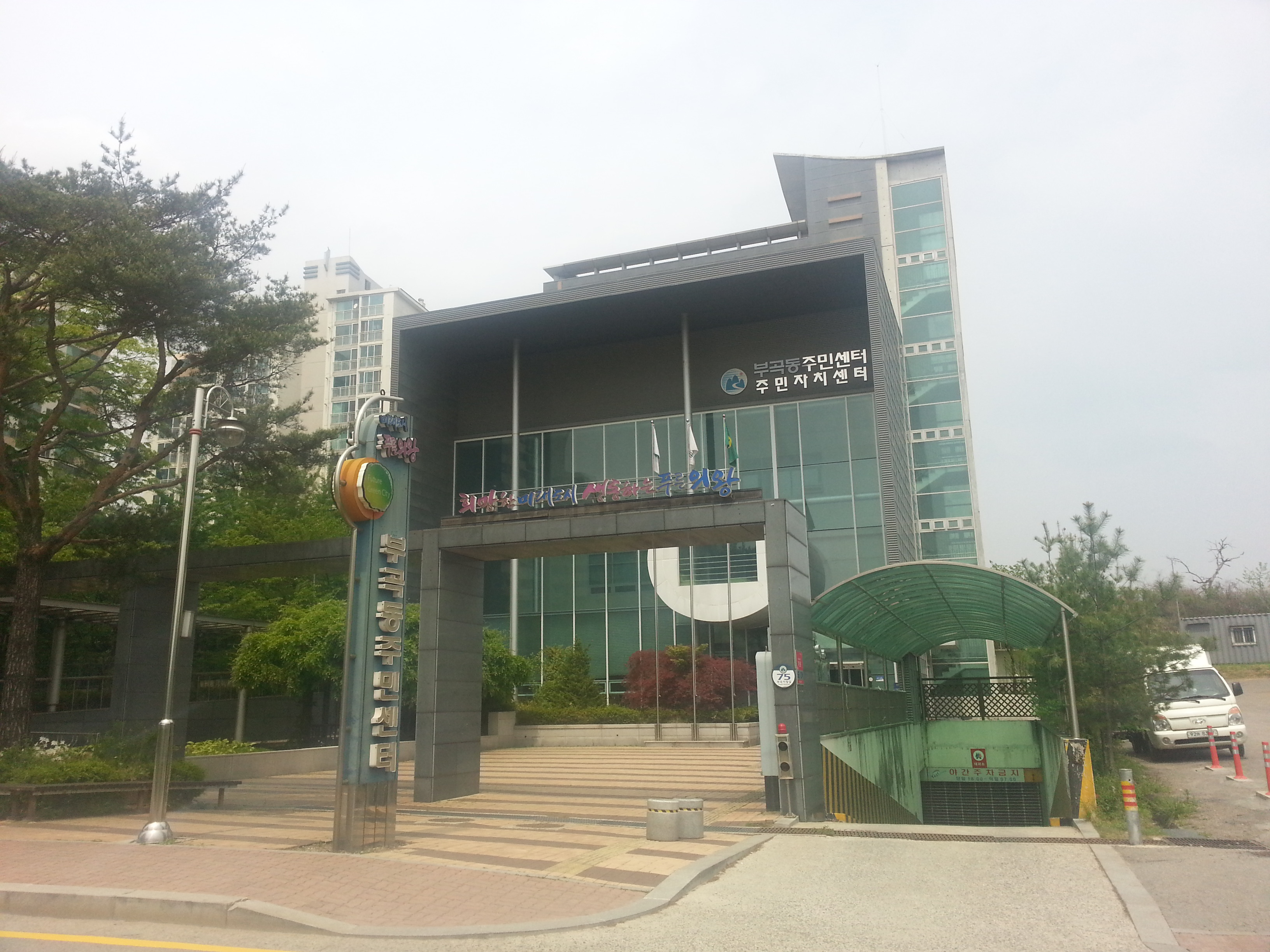
Budok-dong Community Service Center

Bugok-dong (Korean: 부곡동) is neighbourhood of Uiwang, Gyeonggi Province, South Korea.

== Education ==
=== Elementary School ===
- Uiwang Bugok Elementary School
- Deokseong Elementary School

=== Middle School ===
- Uiwang Bugok Middle School

=== High School ===
- Uiwang High School

=== Universities ===
- Korea National University of Transportation (Uiwang campus)

== Transportation ==
=== Subway ===
- Seoul Subway Line 1 - Uiwang Station
