= Lenina Bayrah =

- Founded: 1 July 1921
- Language: Dargwa

Lenina Bayrah ('Lenin's Banner'), a Dargin language newspaper in Dagestan ASSR, Soviet Union. It was published in Makhachkala three times a week. The first issue of the newspaper was published on July 1, 1921. Then its name was Dagestanna muhtariyat ('Dagestani Autonomy'). The newspaper had several different names at different times. In February 1961 the name Lenina Bayrah was adopted. In 1971 the newspaper was awarded the Order of the Badge of Honour. In 1973 it had a circulation of 23 200 copies.
