= Lake Samilpo =

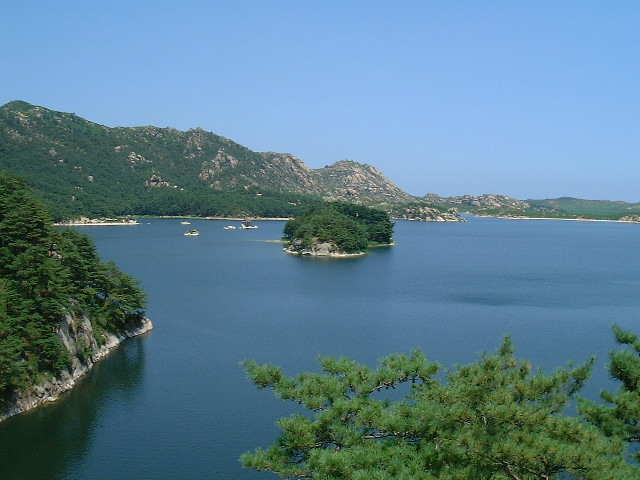

- Location within North Korea
- Coordinates: 38°41′00″N 128°18′00″E
- Type: lake
- Basin countries: North Korea
- Surface area: 80 ha (200 acres)

Lake Samilpo is an 80 hectare (ha) freshwater lake in south-eastern Kangwon Province, located in south-eastern North Korea. It lies about 2 kilometres (km) from the coast of the Sea of Japan and 9 km north-west off the border with South Korea. It is one of North Korea's designated Natural Monuments. With its surrounds of temperate broadleaf and mixed forest, Lake Samilpo has also been identified by BirdLife International as a 160 ha Important Bird Area (IBA). The lake supports populations of wintering water and wetland birds. Species inhabiting the lake include swan geese, greater white-fronted geese, mute swans, whooper swans and red-crowned cranes.
