= Sangnoksu =

1937 Korean novel by Sim Hun

Sangnoksu (Korean: 상록수; Hanja: 常綠樹, translated into English as Evergreen Tree or just An Evergreen) is a 1936 novel by Korean writer Sim Hun on the Korean rural education movement. It is considered his most famous work, and has been described as "one of the most important Korean rural enlightenment novels."

== Plot ==
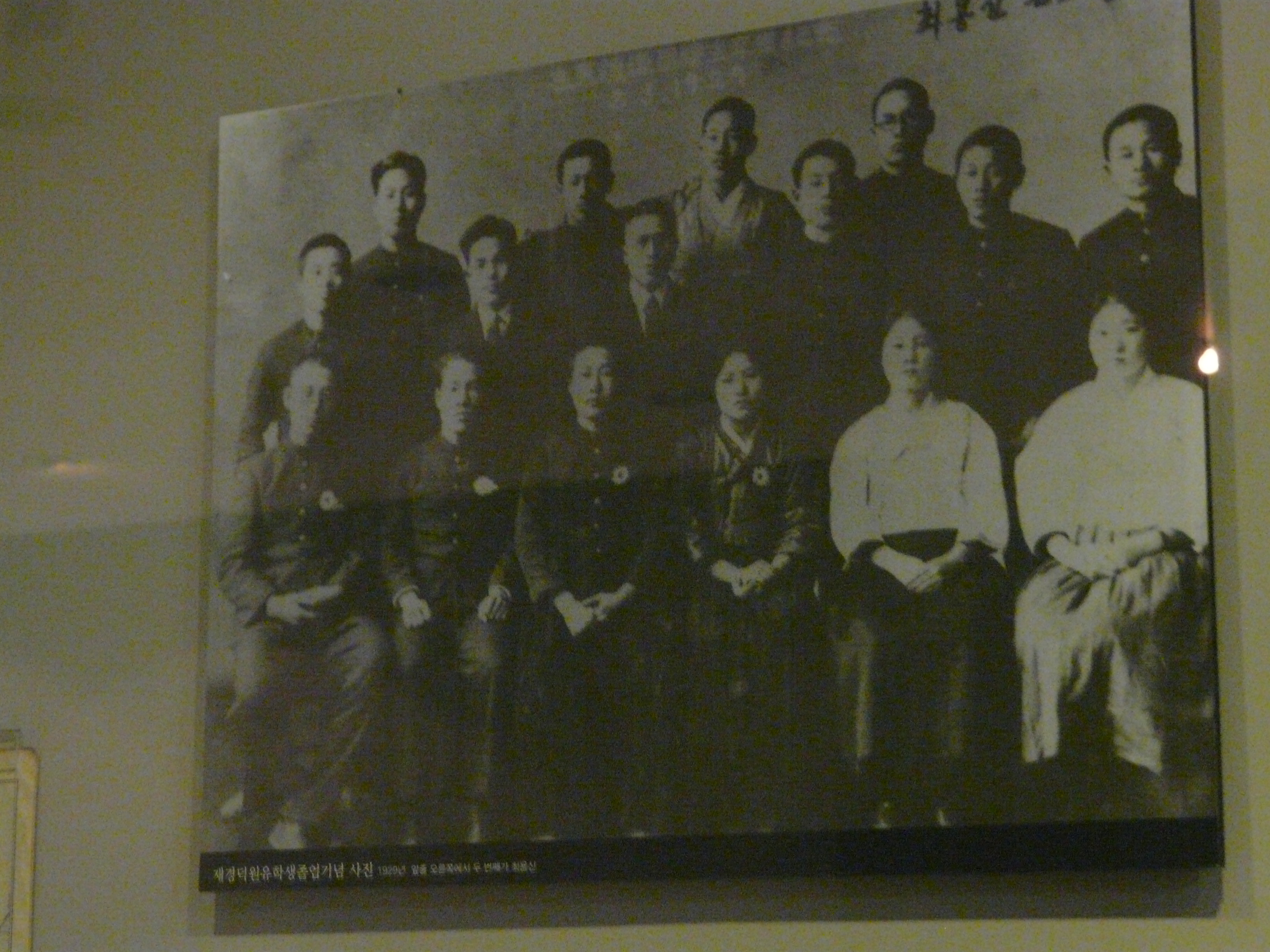
This photo from the Choi Yongshin Memorial Hall likely portrays Choi Yongshin and her fellow activists, who served as inspiration for the novel's protagonists.

The novel takes place in a Korean village, and follows two Korean university students who are working to promote literacy and modern agriculture in the Korean countryside. Sangnosku's main female protagonist, Chae Yeongsin, was modeled after Choi Yongshin (1909–1935), a Korean teacher and activist. Another main character, Park Dong-hyeok, is based on Sim Hun's nephew Shim Jae-yeong, also an educator and activist. The plot of the novel concerns their attempts to balance romance and love with dedication to their educational mission. They agree to spend three years in the countryside before getting married, but Yongshin dies from overwork; Dong-hyeok swears to continue his efforts to promote literacy on her grave.

== Development and significance ==
Sim Hun wrote Sangoksu in 1935 while living in Pilgyeongsa house in Dangjin, Chungcheongnam-do. It was originally serialized in 127 installments published from 10 September 1935 to 15 February 1936 in The Dong-A Ilbo newspaper.

Sim Hun wrote the novel as part of an effort to promote education in the Korean countryside during the Japanese occupation of Korea. The practice of helping rural communities in Korea is known as nonghwal, and Sangoksus female protagonist has been called "a quintessential portrait of such colonial period enlightenment activity".

The novel was influenced by Yi Gwangsu, a Korean writer and independence and nationalist activist, who also wrote the book's introduction.

Sim Hun won the Dong-A Ilbo 15th Anniversary Full-Length Novel Contest, and used much of the prize money (KRW100, which was a significant sum at the time) to help establish Sangnok Elementary School.

Sim Hun had plans to make the novel into a movie, but he died shortly after completing the novel. His plans, however, were eventually realized by others, resulting in two movies based on the novel. The novel has been made into a 1961 movie, The Evergreen Tree, by Shin Sang-ok. Another version of The Evergreen Tree movie was made by Im Kwon-taek in 1978.

The novel is considered Sim Hun's most famous work. It has also been described as "one of the most important Korean rural enlightenment novels".

The neighborhood of Sangnok-gu in Ansan (served by the Sangnoksu Station of Seoul Subway Line 4) is named after the novel. A Choi Yongshin Memorial Hall (최용신기념관대등표제) is located in Sangnok-gu.
