= Sim Hun =

Korean writer (1901–1936)

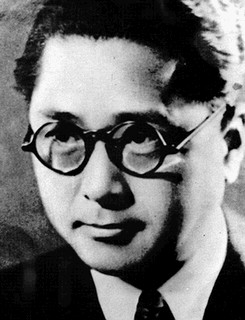

Korean name
- Hangul: 심대섭
- Hanja: 沈大燮
- RR: Sim Daeseop
- MR: Sim Taesŏp

Art name
- Hangul: 심훈
- Hanja: 沈熏
- RR: Sim Hun
- MR: Sim Hun

Shim Daeseop (Korean: 심대섭; 12 September 1901 – 16 September 1936), more commonly known by his art name Shim Hun (also spelled Sim Hun or Sim Hoon), was a Korean novelist, poet, and playwright.

== Biography ==
Shim Hun was born in Seoul in 1901 to an old yangban family which for centuries held high government positions and served the royal court as ministers. His father is Shim Sang-jeong and his mother came from another notable Yangban family Yun (her father was a celebrated calligrapher). Shim Hun was the youngest of three sons and had one sister. He entered the Gyeongseong Ordinary School (경성보통학교, now Gyeonggi High School) in 1915, but due to his participation in the March 1st Movement protests against Japanese rule in Korea in 1919, was arrested and expelled. When he was in prison, Shim Hun wrote his famous impassioned letter to his mother vowing to fight for the freedom of his country ("the Greater Mother") from Japanese rule. Imprisoned for eight months, he went into exile in Hangzhou, China where he attended the Zhejiang University, returning to Korea in 1923.

From then until 1930, Shim Hun worked as a newspaper columnist and reporter at the Dong-a Ilbo, Chosun Ilbo, and Joseon Jung-ang Ilbo. His arranged marriage to his first wife Yi Hae-yeong (Korean: 이해영; Hanja: 李海暎) ended in divorce (1917-1924). Yi Hae-yeong was from the Yi royal family, the daughter of a duke. In 1930, Sim married Ahn Jeong-ok (1913-2004), a "modern woman" whom he met at a music-theatre group, with whom he had three sons; Jae-geun, Jae-gwang and Jae-ho. In 1935 he won an award for his most famous novel Sangnoksu; he used the prize money to create the Sangrok Academy. Sim is credited for the Sangrok (Evergreen Tree) movement which encouraged young, educated people to move to the countryside to educate and organize rural populace, and awaken them from their oppression (e.g., Japanese colonial rule, traditional landed gentry class). He died in 1936 of typhoid fever without seeing his country's independence that came in 1945.

== Works ==
Shim Hun was a prolific writer. In his short life, he wrote several novels, short stories, plays and poems. He was a meticulous writer who kept original copies of his writing; most of Sim's original manuscripts (over 4,000 pages) survive today.

Sim's 1926 novel Talchum (탈춤, Mask Dance) was the first Korean novel to be made into a movie. He wrote a collection of poetry Kunari Omyeon (그날이 오면, When that day comes) to commemorate a student independence movement in Gwangju in 1930, in which he yearns for the day Korea gains independence from Japan. His novel Dongbang-eui Aein (동방의 애인, Lover from the East) was serialised in the Chosun Ilbo beginning in October 1930. His Jiknyuseong ("Weaver Girl" star or Constellation Lyra) was serialized in Chosun Joong Ang Ilbo in 1934 and is believed to honor and be inspired by his first wife Yi Hae-Yeoung's life. He wrote Sangnoksu (상록수, Evergreen Tree), a novel about rural development, in 1935 while staying in Dangjin, Chungcheongnam-do; it was published in 1949 in a novel collection commemorating the 15th anniversary of the Dong-a Ilbo's establishment.

Sim's last work was a poem "Joseonui Nama" or "Chosun's Son" which he wrote after learning that the Korean marathon runner Sohn Kee-chung won the gold medal for Marathon at the 1936 Berlin Olympics. As a colonial subject, Song was forced to run wearing the Japanese flag. Sim wrote the poem on the copy of the Special Bulletin that announced Sohn's victory.

Kunari Omyeon was published in 1949 since the original volume was censored and banned by the Japanese colonial government. A seven-volume series of his books, Sim Hun's Books, came out in 1952 and a three-volume series, Shim Hun's Complete Works, was republished in 1996.

== Legacy ==
Shim Hun's high school issued an honorary graduation diploma in his name in 2005. His third son Shim Jae-Ho, who lives in Virginia, United States, holds the original manuscripts of many of his works; he lent them out to be displayed in Dangjin in 2010. In 2011, the Korea Minting and Security Printing Corporation commemorated Shim Hun in its series of Medals of Korean Historical Figures; Shim was one of 100 notable historical figures to be so recognized.

== Pilgyeongsa ==
In 1932, Shim Hun designed and built his house Pilgyeongsa (필경사) in Dangjin, Chungcheongnam-do, where he wrote most of his major works and his children were born. Today, it is designated as a historical site preserved and managed by the Chungcheongnam-do Provincial Government. In addition, there is a Shim Hun Memorial adjacent to Pilgyeongsa; the government is planning to build a new, expanded memorial.

== See also ==
- Korean literature
- Sangoksu on the Korean-language Wikisource
