= Koryo Ilbo =

Kazakh Korean/Russian–language newspaper

- Front page showcasing 100th anniversary (31 March 2023)
- Type: Weekly newspaper
- Owner: Korean Association of Kazakhstan
- Editor-in-chief: Konstantin Kim
- Founded: 1 March 1923
- Political alignment: Pro-South Korea; Pro-Kazakhstan; Historical: Marxist–Leninist; Anti-Empire of Japan
- Language: Korean; Russian
- Headquarters: Almaty, Kazakhstan
- Circulation: 2,000 copies
- Website: koreilbo.com

The Koryo Ilbo (Note: Korean: 고려일보; Hanja: 高麗日報; lit. 'The Daily Goryeo'; Russian: Корё Ильбо) is a newspaper published in Korean and Russian from Almaty, Kazakhstan, for Koryo-saram (ethnic Koreans of the former Soviet Union). First published in 1923 as the March 1 Newspaper, it changed its name to Sŏnbong, then to Lenin Kichi in 1938, and finally to Koryo Ilbo after the dissolution of the Soviet Union in 1991. It is notable for being one of the oldest Korean-language newspapers and the oldest active outside of the Korean peninsula, having celebrated its 100th anniversary in 2023. It was also for decades the only Korean-language newspaper with nationwide availability in the Soviet Union and a significant promoter of the literature of Koryo-saram, during a period when regional languages were suppressed by the government.

The newspaper is also a significant source for the study of the Korean diaspora, the Korean language, the Korean independence movement, the Korean War, and Korean literature.

It had a circulation of around 40,000 during its peak around the 1970s and 1980s, but due to falling numbers of ethnic Koreans able to speak Korean, now publishes around 2,000 copies and is largely supported by the Association of Koreans in Kazakhstan and the Ministry of Culture, Information, and Communication of Kazakhstan.

== History ==
=== Background ===
According to several sources, the newspaper had an August 1922 predecessor published in Anuchino, Primorsky Krai, called either the March First Newspaper (Note: 3·1 신문; 3·1 新闻; Самвол Ирил) or Red Flag (붉은 기), but scholar and former reporter for Koryo Ilbo Kim Byeong-hag is skeptical of these claims.

The predecessor (if it existed) and the eventual actual paper were published in response to the violent suppression of the 1919 Korean March First Movement by the Empire of Japan. Thousands of Koreans went into exile after the crackdowns, going mainly to Russia, China, and the United States. Many of the paper's staff were also active in the independence movement, and their coverage of the movement has been the subject of study by recent scholars.

=== Sŏnbong ===
On 1 March 1923 in Vladivostok, Soviet Union, the March First Newspaper was published on the fourth anniversary of the March First Movement. A few years afterwards, the newspaper changed its name to Sŏnbong. (Note: 선봉; 先鋒; Сэнбон or Авангард, 'Vanguard') It was published from Khabarovsk around 1929 to 1934, then from Vladivostok again. Like other Soviet newspapers of the time, Sŏnbong was managed by the government, and local Communist officials had control over the staff and content of the paper.

The first editor was Lee Paik-cho. (Note: 리백초; Ли Пяк-чо) Lee also served as the third, sixth, and eighth chief editor. He was born in Seoul and was a lifelong Communist, independence activist, and advocate of Koryo-saram socialist literature. He died in a car accident.

Around 1925, it began publishing Korean-language literature, and made literature a prominent regular feature of the paper in 1933 due in part to efforts by Cho Myŏnghŭi, a prominent Koryo-saram author. This became a significant platform for Koryo-saram to showcase their work.

=== 1937–1938 hiatus ===
During the 1930s, large-scale political purges took place in the Soviet Union, which intensified toward the later part of that decade with the nationalities deportations. On 12 September 1937, after the publication of the 1644th issue of Sŏnbong, the newspaper had a hiatus until March 1938 due to the deportation of Koreans in the Soviet Union, who were forcibly resettled in Soviet Central Asia. Restrictions were also placed on the use and teaching of Korean. The executive staff were arrested, and some were executed.

The staff who survived were relocated to Kyzylorda (now in Kazakhstan), where they began publishing an unofficial temporary newspaper. They also began attempting to obtain permission from Uzbek and Kazakhstan government officials to officially restart the paper, but their movement was restricted and the government initially refused. The Uzbek government even arrested a staff member who was never seen again. However, staff member Yŏm Sail (염사일) managed to get permission by disguising himself as a Kazakh, secretly traveling to Almaty and getting permission, and returning to Kyzylorda.

=== Lenin Kichi ===
Before the migration, there had been three Koryo-saram newspapers: Sŏnbong and two regional papers. In March 1938, the local communist party decided to merge the papers into Sŏnbong. The Central Committee of the Communist Party of South Kazakhstan initially wanted to name the paper For Rice (Для Риса), but the national committee decided on the name Lenin Kichi. (Note: 레닌기치; 레닌旗幟; Ленин Кич, 'Lenin's Banner'. The title was initially spelled slightly differently in both Korean (레닌의 긔치) and Russian (Ленины Кичи), which can be seen on the 15 May 1938 first edition.)

Lenin Kichi was first published as a state newspaper on 15 May 1938 in the Sirdaryo Region of Uzbekistan. Since then, its publication has been uninterrupted. It is allegedly the first Korean newspaper to use horizontal, left-to-right type, as most others at the time wrote vertically and right-to-left.

It initially had around eighteen employees and was allowed to publish issues of four pages, three times per week. Due to limited space and fear of censorship, it initially published less literature than before, but it did publish works from authors like Cho Ki-chon, who later became a significant North Korean poet. Its initial circulation was stated to be around 6,000, but in reality it was likely around 2,000 and later 4,000 in the late 1940s. The staff appealed for more space for articles, higher publishing frequency, and larger circulation for years. The Soviet government allowed them larger pages and five issues on 21 March 1940, but they continued appealing. After Soviet dictator Joseph Stalin's death in 1953, the Kichi began publishing more literature and were allowed national circulation on 1 January 1954. Around this time, their circulation reached around 7,000. It became the only Korean-language newspaper available nationwide in the Soviet Union, although On the Path of Lenin (레닌의 길로) was available locally in Yuzhno-Sakhalinsk.

The contents of the paper aligned closely with Soviet messaging, and featured prominently themes of multi-ethnic families, internationalist unification and collectivism, and the lives of Soviet Koreans. At the time, it was published six times a week, and had branches in cities with significant Korean populations like Tashkent, Dushanbe, and Bishkek. Beginning in the 1950s, reporters from North Korea, Moscow, and Sakhalin joined the newspaper, and local reporters on the ground in various republics across the Soviet Union.

Shortly after the liberation of Korea, many Koryo-saram moved to North Korea, although a number returned between 1955 and 1957 and turned towards Lenin Kichi to publish writing about their experiences. (Note: This occurred during a cool point in North Korea–Soviet relations that culminated in the 1956 August Faction Incident, in which Kim purged a number of Soviet- and Chinese-aligned Koreans.) As such, Kichi newspapers from this period are now considered valuable resources for studying the Korean War.

In the 1970s and 1980s, during a boom in collectivized farming among Koryo-saram, the paper had over 40,000 copies in circulation and around 60–80 employees.

In August 1978, it relocated to Almaty, where it now remains. The paper had actually wanted to relocate since 1954, but this decision was caught up in bureaucracy until 1978. It published its first issue from Almaty on 2 September 1978. Despite its recent successes, in Almaty it struggled with dated printing technology, meaning it could only publish four-page papers twice and two-page papers three times per week. After requesting newer equipment, it switched from movable type to photolithography printers.

=== Koryo Ilbo and decline ===
However, the newspaper began a period of decline in the last years of the Soviet Union. One significant and still-relevant issue was the decreasing number of Korean speakers. After regional languages were suppressed in the Soviet Union in the 1930s and minorities were given more freedom of movement after Stalin's death in the 1950s, fewer and fewer Koryo-saram spoke Korean. The paper had benefited from acquiring personnel from Sakhalin and North Korea until the late 1960s, but this did not halt the decline. Beginning in March 1989, Russian-language pages began occupying a fourth of each edition. Every Saturday, it published entirely in Russian under the name Koryo (고려; 高麗), but this closed after 84 issues due to financial issues.

It changed its name to Koryo Ilbo (meaning "The Daily Goryeo") on 31 December 1990 and published its first edition under the new name on 2 January 1991, right around the time of the dissolution of the Soviet Union. Despite its name implying daily circulation, it decreased publishing frequency first to five times per week, then later to three times. It greatly slowed the publication of literature. Due to economic instability, changing currencies, and changing mail systems, it lost subscribers from across the Soviet Union. By the end of 1993, it had around 400 subscribers.

The sudden liberalization of the market and freedom of movement also caused economic instability. Leadership turned over frequently, and many employees left to take opportunities abroad, especially to South Korea. Around this time, the paper began aligning itself closer with South Korea, and even adjusting its style and vocabulary from North Korean to South Korean standards. This switch was of interest to South Korean scholars studying the standardization of Korean writing in the 20th century. Former regional branches of the Lenin Kichi split off and became their own regional newspapers. By 1994, circulation briefly recovered to around 4,500 copies, but publication frequency decreased to once per week, which it maintains as of April 2023. Of sixteen pages, four are in Korean and twelve in Russian. In late 1999, the Kazakhstan government privatized all state-supported newspapers, leading to the Association of Koreans in Kazakhstan taking ownership on 1 March 2000, and reduced its support of Koryo Ilbo to around 30%.

The newspaper began using computers in the mid-1990s, and publishing online articles since the late 2000s. This has allegedly supported international readership of its articles. Its older editions were also digitized and made freely available around 2003. In the late 2000s, it stopped publishing literature, especially after the retirement of one of the last major Koryo-saram authors, Chŏng Sangjin.

== Current status ==
As of 2023, the paper still publishes on a weekly basis, both online and in print, where circulation is now around 2,000 copies. The number of Koryo-saram able to speak Korean continues to decrease. It is owned and financially supported by the Association of Koreans in Kazakhstan, and also receives government subsidies. It also maintains reporters in Russia and Uzbekistan, and covers stories about Koryo-saram across the former Soviet Union.

Since the 1990s, all editors-in-chief have been native-Russian speakers. Around 2018, the paper had fewer than 10 employees, and there has usually only been one Korean-language reporter since the early 2000s, namely Sakhalin-born Nam Gyeong-ja (남경자) as of 2019. (Note: Kim Byeong-hag had predicted Koryo Ilbo would not last until 2023 because of Nam Kyung-ja's lifespan. She was already 69 years old in 2011.)

The paper currently tends to align itself with Kazakh government messaging. Since 2009, the paper has also published articles in the Kazakh language and information about Kazakh history and culture, which Lee Jin-hae suggests is at the request of the Kazakh government. It also published articles between 1991 and 2017 advocating for the emigration of Russians, adopting a Kazakh identity, and encouraging the learning and use of the Kazakh language. As does the Kazakh government, it advocates for Korean unification and aligns itself closely with South Korea. However, it has published opinion pieces that disagree with the government on occasion, including pieces skeptical of 1990s laws aimed at increasing the use of the Kazakh language.

While the paper is hopeful it will continue publishing, scholars like Kim Byeong-Hak are doubtful of its long term prospects.

The newspaper is of the oldest active Korean-language newspapers and the oldest active independent newspaper outside of the Korean peninsula. According to KBS Chairman Nam Young-jin, older still-active papers in the US such as the New York Hankook Ilbo and the Chicago JoongAng Ilbo are considered branches of Korean newspapers. In 2023, it celebrated its 100th anniversary. Various exhibitions were held in both Kazakhstan and South Korea to commemorate the event, including at the National Library of Kazakhstan, the Wolgok Koryo-in Cultural Center in Gwangju, and at Honam University.

== Awards ==
In 1988, it received the Order of Friendship of Peoples award from the Soviet government on the 50th anniversary of the newspaper's change to Lenin Kichi. In 2001, it received the Uiam Jang Ji-yeon Press Award.

== See also ==
- Haejo Sinmun – a Koryo-saram newspaper published in 1908
- Se Korea Sinmun – a newspaper for Sakhalin Koreans
