= Telegraph (disambiguation) =

Telegraph is any apparatus or process to convey messages over long distances with no intermediary messenger.

Telegraph may also refer to:

== Communication ==
- Electrical telegraph, sends and receives messages via electric signals
- Printing telegraph, electrical telegraph that uses plain text instead of code
- Optical telegraph, sending visual signals with pivoting shutters in towers
- Hydraulic telegraph, based on the displacement of water in pipes, or on container water levels
- Engine order telegraph, device on a ship used by the pilot to signal engine speeds

== Arts and entertainment ==
- Telegraphing (entertainment), giving a clear hint of the meaning or outcome of a dramatic action through acting

=== Music ===
- Telegraph (album), a 2005 album by Drake Bell (includes the title song)
- Telegraphs (band), an English alternative-rock band
- "Telegraph" (song), a 1983 single by Orchestral Manoeuvres in the Dark
- Telegraph Melts, a 1986 album by Jandek

=== Periodicals ===
- The Telegraph (disambiguation), several newspapers called The Telegraph, Daily Telegraph or Sunday Telegraph
- Evening Telegraph, a list of newspapers with that title
- Morning Telegraph, a list of newspapers with that title

== Places ==
=== United States ===
- Telegraph, Texas, a ghost town in Kimble County, Texas
- Telegraph Avenue, in Alameda County, California
- Telegraph City, an unincorporated community in Calaveras County, California
- Telegraph Peak (California), in the San Gabriel Mountains, San Bernardino County, California
- Telegraph Peak (Lander County, Nevada)
- Telegraph Canyon Formation, a geologic formation in Nevada

=== Canada ===
- Telegraph Cove, a community on Vancouver Island, British Columbia
- Telegraph Creek, a community in British Columbia
- Telegraph Range, group of hills on the Nechako Plateau, British Columbia Interior
- Telegraph House, a historic hotel located in Baddeck, Nova Scotia

=== Elsewhere ===
- Telegraph, Isles of Scilly, a settlement on the island of St Mary's, England
- Telegraph Plateau, a region of the North Atlantic
- Telegraph Column (Damascus), Syria, is a commemorative monument
- Telegraph House (Taganrog), a building in Taganrog, Rostov region
- Telegraph Island, in the Elphinstone Inlet
- Telegraph Hill (disambiguation), various places
- Telegraph Road (disambiguation), various roads
- Telegraph Building (disambiguation), various buildings
- Telegraph Peak (disambiguation), various peaks
- Télégraphe station, a Paris Metro station

== Ships ==
- Telegraph (1903 sternwheeler), a steamboat in Oregon and Washington, United States
- Telegraph (1914 sternwheeler), a steamboat in Oregon, United States
- HMS Telegraph, several vessels of the Royal Navy
- PS Telegraph, a paddle steamer of the London and North Western Railway
- PS Telegraph, a paddle steamer which exploded in Norwich in 1817

== Other uses ==
- Telegraph (sports), to unintentionally alert an opponent to one's immediate situation
- Telegraph Media Group, publisher of UK newspapers, previously Telegraph Group
- Telegraph plant, a tropical Asian shrub

== See also ==
- Telegram (disambiguation)
- Telegraph code, a character encodings used to transmit information through telegraphy machines
- Telegraph Avenue (novel), a 2012 book by Michael Chabon
- El Telégrafo (disambiguation)
