= Asian Volunteer Corps =

- 亚洲志愿军团
- Emblem and shoulder patch of the Asian Volunteer Corps
- Founded: 2026; 0 years ago
- Allegiance: Ukraine
- Branch: Ukrainian Ground Forces
- Type: Infantry and special operations
- Engagements: Russo-Ukrainian War; Russian invasion of Ukraine; Southern front of the Russo-Ukrainian war (2022–present)
- Website: Official X page

Commanders
- Current commander: Unknown

The Asian Volunteer Corps is a unit of the Ukrainian Ground Forces made up of volunteers from countries in Asia. The unit was activated in July 2026, following the dissolution of the International Legion.

== History ==
The AVC was formed in July 2026 as a company-sized unit meant to handle the influx of volunteers from east and southeast Asia. The purpose of the unit was to consolidate Asian volunteers previously scattered throughout the International Legion and to resolve language and communication barriers.

The unit's first deployment was to the Zaporizhzhia region in eastern Ukraine in July 2026.

== Composition ==
The Asian Volunteer Corps includes volunteers from multiple different countries, mainly Japan, China, Taiwan, and South Korea. Many Japanese volunteers are veterans of the Japan Self-Defense Forces.

== Legality ==
According to Chinese, Japanese, and South Korean law, citizens of those countries are prohibited from fighting in a foreign military. The Taiwanese government does not explicitly prohibit its citizens from volunteering for a foreign military, however it is highly discouraged.
