= The Telegraph =

The Telegraph, Daily Telegraph, Sunday Telegraph and other variant names are often names for newspapers. Newspapers with these titles include:

== Australia ==
- The Telegraph (Adelaide), a newspaper in Adelaide, South Australia, published 1867–1922
- The Daily Telegraph (Sydney), New South Wales, founded 1879
  - The Sunday Telegraph (Sydney), its weekend publication
- Daily Telegraph (Melbourne), Victoria, published 1869–1892
- The Daily Telegraph (Launceston), Tasmania, published 1883–1928
- The Telegraph (Brisbane), Queensland, published 1872–1988
- The Daily Telegraph and North Murchison and Pilbarra Gazette, Meekatharra, Western Australia, published 1909–1947
- Prahran Telegraph, Melbourne, Victoria, published 1860–1930
- The Shoalhaven Telegraph, Nowra, New South Wales, published 1879–1937

== Canada ==
- Telegraph-Journal, Saint John, New Brunswick
- The Toronto Daily Telegraph, published 1866–1872

== United Kingdom ==
- The Daily Telegraph, commonly called The Telegraph, a broadsheet newspaper founded in 1855
  - The Sunday Telegraph, Sunday printed edition, founded 1961
  - Telegraph.co.uk, The Telegraph, an online newspaper with syndicated content from The Daily and The Sunday, along with original reporting
- The Telegraph (magazine), Bob Dylan fanzine, published 1981–1997
- Belfast Telegraph, Northern Ireland
- Community Telegraph, Northern Ireland, published 2007–2013
- Coventry Telegraph, England
- Derby Telegraph, England
- Greenock Telegraph, Scotland
- Grimsby Telegraph, a regional newspaper
- Jewish Telegraph, a Jewish newspaper
- Lancashire Telegraph, East Lancashire, England
- Sheffield Telegraph, England
- Telegraph & Argus, Bradford, England

== United States ==
- The Telegraph (Alton, Illinois), founded 1836
- The Telegraph (Macon, Georgia), founded 1826
- The Telegraph (Nashua, New Hampshire), New Hampshire, founded 1832
- Bluefield Daily Telegraph, Bluefield, West Virginia
- Civilian & Telegraph, Cumberland, Maryland, published 1859–1905
- Durango Telegraph, Colorado
- Rome Telegraph, Rome, New York, published in the 1830s, eventually renamed the Rome Sentinel
- Spiritual Telegraph, New York City, published 1852–1860
- Telegraph and Texas Register, Houston, published 1835–1877
- Telegraph Herald, Dubuque, Iowa
- The Catholic Telegraph, Cincinnati, Ohio
- United States' Telegraph, Washington, DC

== Elsewhere ==
- Telegraph (Bulgarian newspaper), a Bulgarian national daily newspaper published in Sofia
- The Telegraph (India), is an Indian national daily newspaper founded in 1982
- The Daily Telegraph (Napier, New Zealand), New Zealand, published 1871–1999
- De Telegraaf, Dutch newspaper, founded 1893
- Hongkong Telegraph, Hong Kong newspaper published 1881–1924
- The Connaught Telegraph, Castlebar, County Mayo, Ireland
- Telegrafi, Kosovo

== See also ==
- Telegraph (disambiguation)
- Evening Telegraph, a list of newspapers with that title
- Morning Telegraph, a list of newspapers with that title
