= Mark Hollingsworth (journalist) =

Mark Hollingsworth is an investigative journalist, historian and author of eleven books, notably Londongrad – From Russia with Cash, the Inside Story of the Oligarchs, and ‘Agents of Influence – How the KGB Subverted Western Democracies’. He has also written biographies of Mark Thatcher and Tim Bell as well as books on MI5 and the Saudi Royal Family.

== Early life ==
Hollingsworth was born in 1959 and educated in South Africa and the UK.

== Career ==
Hollingsworth's career started as a freelance reporter for The New Statesman during the 1984–1985 United Kingdom miners' strike. He was also one of the journalists to expose MI5 blacklisting of BBC producers, researchers and employees which was published in The Observer.

Between 1987 and 1992 Hollingsworth worked as a journalist for the award-winning ITV current affairs series World in Action where he specialised in investigating political corruption. His documentaries included The Private World of John Browne (1989), MPs for Hire (1990) and The Dirty War(1992).

Since 1986 Hollingsworth has written 11 books with his most recent being Agents of Influence, How the KGB Subverted Western Democracies.

He is a regular contributor to The Times), The Independent, The Telegraph, Unherd, and The Spectator

In the past Hollingsworth wrote regularly for The Guardian, Sunday Times, The Observer, Tatler, London Evening Standard, Financial Times and Private Eye.

== Bibliography ==
- The Press and Political Dissent: A Question of Censorship (Pluto Press, 1986)
- Blacklist: Inside Story of Political Vetting with Richard Norton-Taylor (Chatto & Windus, 1988)
- The Economic League: The Silent McCarthyism with Charles Tremayne (Civil Liberties Trust, 1989)
- MPs For Hire, The Secret World of Political Lobbying (Bloomsbury, 1991)
- The Ultimate Spin Doctor, The Life & Fast Times of Tim Bell (Hodder & Stoughton, 1997)
- Defending The Realm, Inside MI5 and the War on Terrorism with Nick Fielding (Andre Deutsch, 2003)
- Thatcher’s Fortunes, The Life & Times of Mark Thatcher with Paul Halloran (Mainstream, 2005)
- Saudi Babylon, Torture Corruption and Cover-Up Inside the House of Saud (Mainstream, 2005)
- Londongrad, From Russia with Cash – The inside story of the Oligarchs with Stewart Lansley (Fourth Estate, 2010)
- Against The Odds, The Rise of Nigeria as Africa’s Economic Superpower (Matador, 2014)
- Agents of Influence, How the KGB Subverted Western Democracies (Oneworld Publications, 2023)
