= International Legion (Ukraine) =

Ukrainian military unit

- Інтернаціональний легіон
- Emblem of the International Legion for the Defence of Ukraine
- Founded: 27 February 2022; 4 years ago
- Allegiance: Ukraine
- Branch: Ukrainian Ground Forces; Main Directorate of Intelligence
- Type: Infantry and special operations
- Role: Anti-tank warfare Clandestine operations Cold-weather warfare Counterintelligence; Direct action Force protection HUMINT; Internal security Irregular warfare Long-range penetration Military intelligence Patrolling; Raiding; Reconnaissance; Special operations Urban warfare
- Size: 1,500–30,000 (2022–2023)
- Anniversaries: 7 March
- Engagements: Russo-Ukrainian War; Russian invasion of Ukraine; Battle of Kharkiv; Battle of Kyiv; Battle of Sievierodonetsk; Battle of Bakhmut; 2023 Ukrainian counteroffensive; March 2024 western Russia incursion
- Website: Official website

Commanders
- Current commander: Unknown

The International Legion for the Defence of Ukraine, (Note: Ukrainian: Інтернаціональний легіон територіальної оборони України, romanized: Internatsionalnyi lehion terytorialnoi oborony Ukrainy) or the Ukrainian Foreign Legion, is a military unit of the Ukrainian Ground Forces composed of foreign volunteers. It was created on 27 February 2022 by the Ukrainian government at the request of President Volodymyr Zelenskyy to fight against the Russian invasion of the country. It was originally part of the Territorial Defense Forces, under the name of International Legion of Territorial Defence of Ukraine, eventually transitioning to the command of the Ukrainian Ground Forces at some point in its existence. The most effective combat units and soldiers were transferred under the auspices of the Main Directorate of Intelligence as the International Legion of the Defence Intelligence of Ukraine.

== History ==
=== Formation of the unit ===
On 27 February 2022 (three days after the invasion began), under the order by President Volodymyr Zelenskyy, the unit was created to join the defense against the ongoing Russian invasion of Ukraine. Its formation was announced in a statement by the Ukrainian Foreign Minister Dmytro Kuleba. Kuleba promoted the unit on Twitter, inviting individuals to apply and stating that "together we defeated Hitler, and we will defeat Putin too." On 7 March, the Ukrainian Armed Forces released the first image of International Legion soldiers in trenches on the outskirts of Kyiv and announced that new groups were being deployed to the front each day.

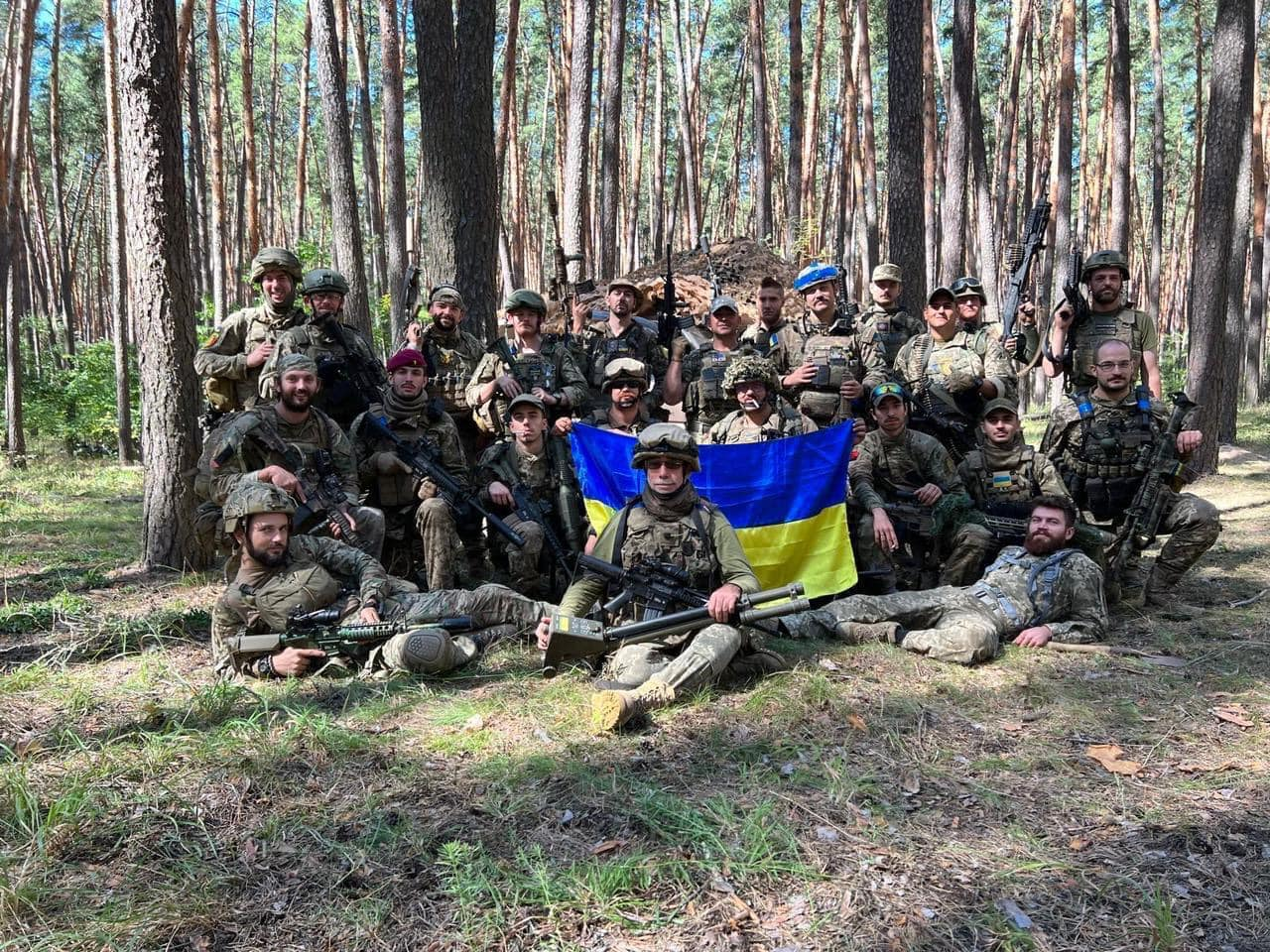
International Legion of Territorial Defence Forces of Ukraine

The arriving volunteers were initially registered at Lviv From there, they were transferred to the Yavoriv military base where recruits were sorted according to their previous military experience. Some volunteers, known derisively as "screamers", had arrived with no military training; many of these turned for home after the base was attacked by a Russian missile on 13 March, possibly prompted by inexperienced volunteers posting their whereabouts on social media. Some veteran volunteers decided not to wait at the base to be organised into units, but made their own way towards the front line, hoping to be accepted into existing combat formations.

Foreign volunteers had first come to Ukraine in 2014, to join the fight against Russian separatist forces as members of Ukrainian volunteer battalions that have been created after the start of the War in the Donbas. Most foreign fighters arrived throughout the summer of 2014, and on 6 October 2014, the Ukrainian parliament voted to allow foreigners to join the Ukrainian military.

While these units have officially been integrated into the Ukrainian Armed Forces, some units such as the Georgian Legion still exercise some autonomy. Prior to the formation of the International Legion, the Georgian Legion was used to train English-speaking foreign volunteers. Kacper Rękawek, a researcher on foreign fighters in Ukraine, believes the majority of Western fighters prior to the 2022 Russian invasion of Ukraine passed through the Georgian Legion.

Other foreign volunteer battalions in the Ukrainian military included the Dzhokhar Dudayev Battalion and Sheikh Mansur Battalion –both formed by anti-Russian and anti-Ramzan Kadyrov Chechens, and the Tactical Group "Belarus" (formed by anti-Lukashenko Belarusians).

While Rękawek said that some foreign fighters that traveled to Ukraine in 2014 held extremist political beliefs and supported the Azov Battalion or the Russian separatist forces in Donbas, the foreign fighters travelling to Ukraine in early 2022 "don't appear to be motivated, as a group, by a certain set of ideological tropes". He also said the mobilization of foreign fighters in 2022 is much larger than the mobilization in 2014. According to Rękawek, the formation of the International Legion was "an attempt to internationalize the conflict via mobilization of Western individuals for the Ukrainian cause. This development would also assist in embarrassing the Western governments, who in the eyes of many Ukrainians are not doing enough to support Kyiv."

=== Subsequent developments ===
On 11 April 2023, defense minister Oleksiy Reznikov invited foreign F-16 pilots to join the international legion and fly combat missions for Ukraine, as well as those who know how to maintain Western-made artillery and tanks.

On June 18, 2025, the Verkhovna Rada passed a law reducing the necessary contract time for foreign fighters to apply for Ukrainian citizenship from three years to one, as well as introducing a special certificate for foreigners who cannot travel abroad obtain or exchange a passport in their country of origin due to threats or political circumstances.

According to reports published in the Kyiv Independent, the International Legion will eventually merge with regular Ukrainian military units. Many volunteers criticized this move as a "fracture" and "dissolv[ing]."

According to the Ukrainian General Staff, the 1st, 2nd, 3rd and 4th Battalions of the Legion will be disbanded on 31 December 2025, with a planned transfer of foreign volunteers into a new branch of assault troops with drone components. The Ukrainian General Staff reported that the International Legion of the Defence Intelligence of Ukraine will keep its status as an international unit.

On August 28, 2026, a draft bill was submitted by the Ukrainian government to give foreign and stateless nationals who served in the Ukrainian military more time to formalize their residency status after the end of their contract.

On September 18, 2026, the National Guard of Ukraine created a recruiting center for foreign volunteers.

== Historical comparisons ==
Many commentators have compared the International Legion to the International Brigades of the Spanish Civil War, which comprised foreign volunteers who supported the Second Spanish Republic against the Nationalist faction led by fascist general Francisco Franco that sought to overthrow the Republic.

Other commentators have criticized this comparison. Sebastiaan Faber of Oberlin College in the U.S. argued that depicting the Legion as part of a war between fascism and anti-fascism risks playing "into the Kremlin's narrative, which seeks to portray the "special military operation" as an effort to "denazify" its western neighbor." Critics have also highlighted differences in the makeup of the two international units: volunteers to Spain generally lacked military experience, while those to Ukraine tend to have prior military experience. Moreover, the Brigades were organized by the Communist International, and thus mostly comprised communists with backgrounds in labour movements, whereas the Ukrainian Legion is composed of volunteers from a broader spectrum of ideologies.

Elizabeth Grasmeder of Duke University has compared Ukraine's foreign legion to Finland's efforts to recruit legionnaires and other foreign volunteers during the Winter War (1939–1940). Grasmeder argues states are likely to recruit foreign volunteers when fighting wars of "national survival" against another state attempting to annex their territory. Ukraine's conflict with Russia is an interstate conflict of "national survival" against annexation, as was Finland's with the Soviet Union.

In establishing the force, Ukraine joined more than 90 other nations that have recruited legionnaires and raised foreign legions over the previous two centuries.

A modern-day organization that holds the same name and has a similar structure is the Interbrigades, a pro-Russian militia operating in Donbas since 2014.

== Recruitment and selection ==
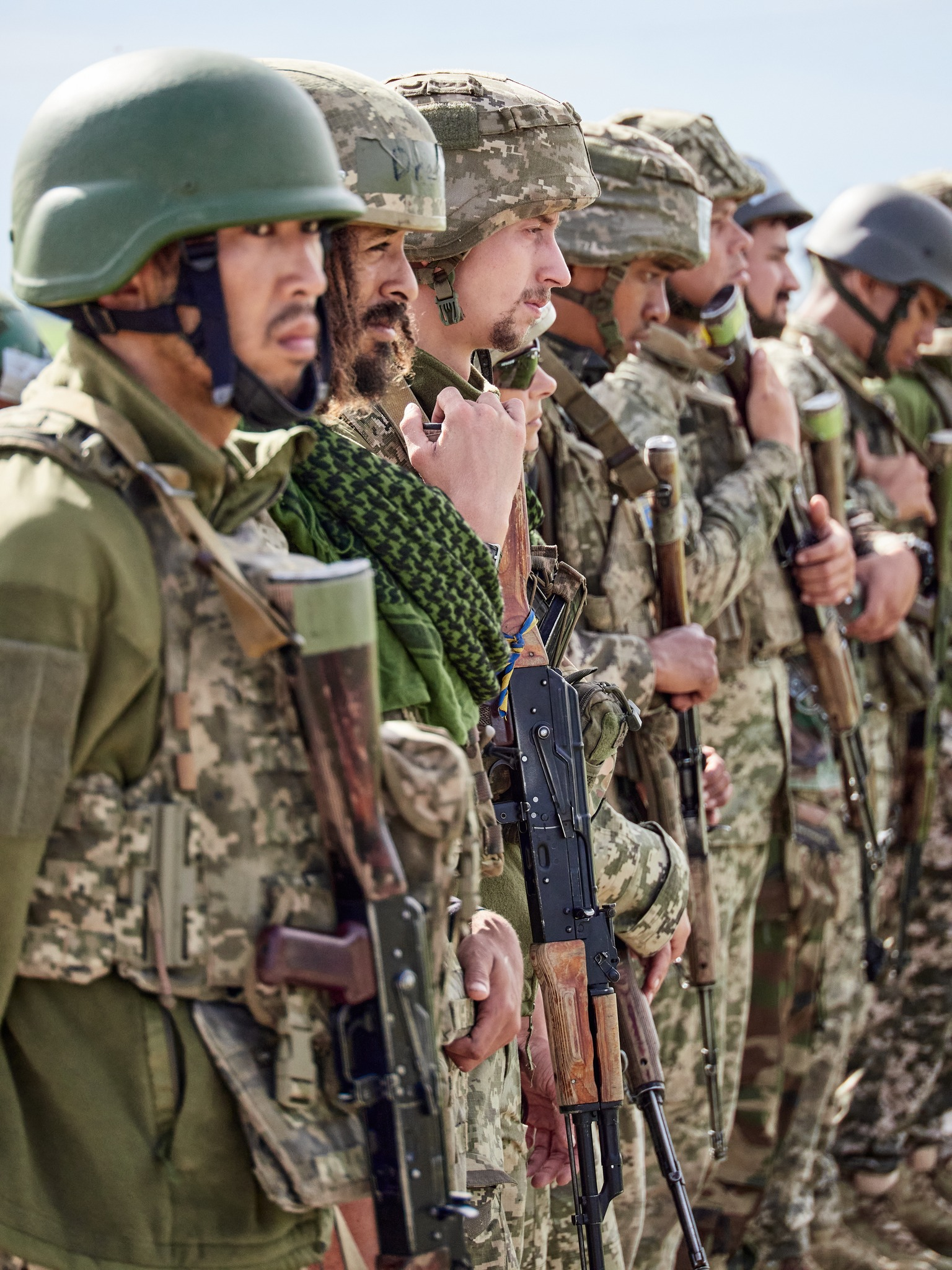
Legionnaires of the Ukrainian International Legion undergoing training, July 2024

Early recruitment efforts prioritized former soldiers, especially those with experience in combat. However, regardless of their experience, most of the volunteers who reached Lviv and applied in the early days of the war were accepted.

The First Deputy Interior Minister of Ukraine, Yevhen Yenin, announced in March 2022 that volunteers to the International Legion would be eligible for Ukrainian citizenship, if desired. The necessary probation period is the duration of the war.

As of January 2025, the standard contract length was three years, however soldiers could terminate their contracts at any time. Starting May 2024, Ukraine began prohibiting soldiers from terminating their contracts before completing six months of service. Monthly pay matches enlisted soldier pay in regular Ukrainian units, ranging from approximately $550 per month for rear-line troops to $4800 per month while on a combat deployment.

Selection criteria have broadened since 2022, and now the International Legion accepts those without any experience in military organizations, so long as they demonstrate a willingness to serve. Priority is still given to combat veterans, former military personnel, and other people experienced in relevant fields such as firefighting, medical aid, and law enforcement. Additionally, applicants must be fluent in either English, Spanish, or the Ukrainian language. Applicants must have no criminal record. Candidates receive a physical health assessment before being admitted, which includes an assessment of physical fitness.

Almost all International Legion soldiers receive some amount of training before joining their unit in the Ukrainian military. For those who recently left military service and are thus expected to have a strong foundation of combat skills and drills, only 1–2 weeks of training is required to familiarize them with Ukrainian communications and command structure. For those with less experience, they are put through an expedited form of basic combat training that often lasts up to 6 weeks.

In May 2024, a spokesman for the legion said that people from more than 100 nations had joined the unit.

== Strength and organization ==
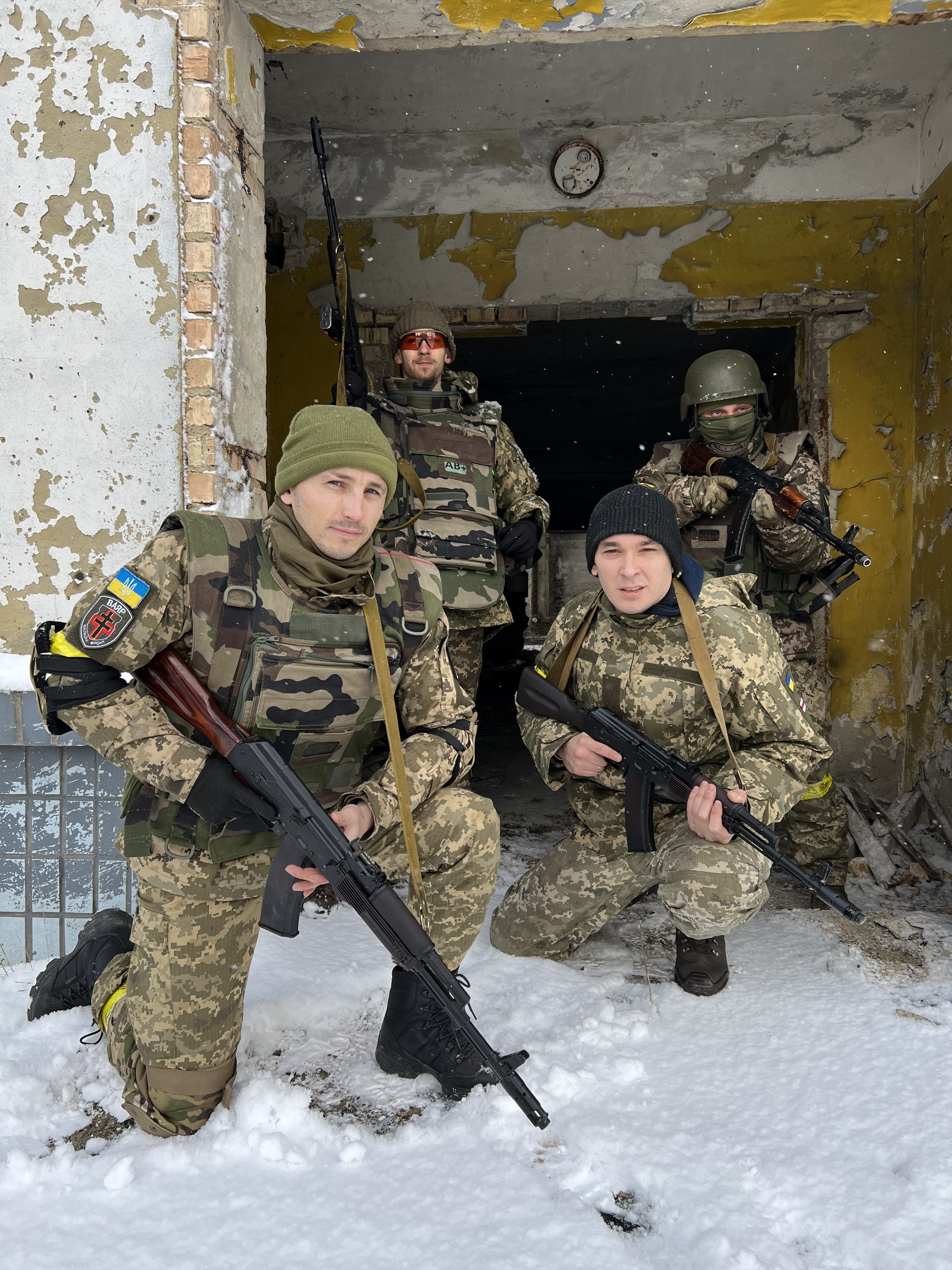
Belarusian volunteers in 2022

Kacper Rękawek, a researcher on foreign fighters in Ukraine, stressed the large number of volunteers announced by Ukraine were "people who applied, who got in touch with the Ukrainian Embassy" and not necessarily the number of foreign fighters in Ukraine.

On 3 March 2022, Zelenskyy announced 16,000 foreign volunteers had attempted to join the International Legion.

On 7 March 2022, Ukrainian Foreign Minister Dmytro Kuleba stated that more than 20,000 volunteers from 52 countries have volunteered to fight for Ukraine. He did not mention the home countries of the volunteers, saying that some of the countries forbid their citizens from fighting for other countries. He also did not specify how many of the foreign volunteers have arrived in Ukraine.

However, investigations in early 2023 by the New York Times and VICE have placed the number of foreign fighters far lower, stating that there were actually only 1,500–2,000 foreign fighters supporting Ukraine. Marco Bocchese, an assistant professor of international relations at Webster Vienna Private University, called the claim of 20,000 volunteers "pure propaganda".

Recruits with past military experience have described the legion as insufficiently officered, leading to unnecessary casualties.

=== Government acknowledgment of nationals serving in the International Legion ===
In early March 2022, a French government adviser confirmed a dozen French nationals were in Ukraine and had likely joined the International Legion.

The first photo distributed by the Ukrainian armed forces of the International Legion included members from the United Kingdom, Mexico, the United States, India, Sweden, and Lithuania.

On 9 March 2022, the National Post reported that an anonymous representative of the International Legion of Territorial Defence of Ukraine had confirmed 550 Canadians were in the Canadian Ukrainian Brigade fighting in Ukraine. Belgian Minister of Defence Ludivine Dedonder confirmed on 15 March 2022 that one Belgian soldier had resigned to join the International Legion and another Belgian soldier had deserted to enlist in the International Legion.

Former New Zealand defense minister Ron Mark said that around 20 New Zealanders are fighting for the legion.

== Structure and units ==
=== List of standalone units ===
The units and their respective nationalities have been reported as being part of the wider International Legion proper:

Patch	Name	Description
	1st Battalion	The first battalion of the Legion formed on 27 February 2022. It is a light infantry battalion made up of international volunteers from several nations. It has participated in some of the most critical battles in the war.
	2nd Battalion	Formed in October 2022. It is a battalion made up of international volunteers from several countries, notably from Latin America.
	3rd Battalion	Formed on 27 February 2022. It is a special forces battalion made up of international volunteers.
	4th Battalion	Newly established light infantry battalion responsible for the training of international volunteers. People accepted into the 4th Battalion are trained to US and NATO standards.
	Canadian-Ukrainian Brigade	Formed in March 2022. Made up of ex-Canadian servicemen and fresh volunteers.
	Dzhokhar Dudayev Battalion	One of several Chechen volunteer armed formations fighting on the side of Ukraine. The battalion is named after the first President of the Chechen Republic of Ichkeria, Dzhokhar Dudayev. Their commander is Adam Osmayev.
	Khamzat Gelayev Detachment	One of several Chechen volunteer armed formations. The battalion was created in honor of one of the most respected Chechen commanders of the Chechen Republic of Ichkeria, Khamzat Gelayev. Many of its members are veterans from Gelayev's special forces.
	Separate Special Purpose Battalion	One of several Chechen volunteer armed formations. The battalion is subordinate to the Ministry of Defence of the Chechen Republic of Ichkeria. Consists of Chechen veterans of the Chechen wars as well as the Syrian civil-war.
	Imam Shamil Dagestan Battalion	Consists of members of the several ethnic groups of Dagestan.
	Pahonia Regiment	Consists of Belarusians. Disbanded on 1 July 2023.
	Bashkort Company	Consists of ethnic Bashkirs affiliated with the Committee of Bashkir Resistance.
	Black Bridge	Military wing of the Russian opposition and partisan group Black Bridge.
	Bolívar Battalion	Consists of volunteers from South American countries such as Colombia, Venezuela, Ecuador and Argentina. There are also Ukrainians, Americans and Australians.
	Romanian Battlegroup Getica	Consists of citizens of Romania and Moldova.
	Armenian Legion	Consists of citizens of Armenia.

Other well-known military units composed by foreign nationals are the Chechen Sheikh Mansur Battalion and 34th Assault Battalion "Mad Pack", the Muslim Caucasian Muslim Corps "Caucasus", the Canadian Black Maple Company, and the diverse Norman Brigade. However, these are not part of the International Legion proper, but are a part of the Ukrainian Ground Forces. These thus serve as affiliated units to the Legion.

=== International Legion of the Defence Intelligence of Ukraine ===
Several units of the International legion are subordinate to the Main Directorate of Intelligence (HUR) as part of International Legion of the Defence Intelligence of Ukraine. This unit largely consist of the larger, better trained, and equipped former members of the legion.

Patch	Name	Description
	Freedom of Russia Legion	Volunteers are former servicemen of the Russian Armed Forces, as well as other Russians and Belarusians volunteers living in Ukraine.
	Russian Volunteer Corps	Volunteers from the Russian diaspora, more radical, ideological, and further right politically than the Freedom of Russia Legion. Led by Denis Kapustin.
	Karelian Group	Formed in 2023, consists of Karelians. The Battalion is a part of the Karelian National Movement.
	Sibir Battalion	Consists largely of indigenous Russian volunteers, whose end goal is their peoples' independence from the Russian Federation, as well as ethnic Russians who disagree with Kremlin policy.
	Belarusian Volunteer Corps	Consists of Belarusians. Includes the Terror Battalion.
	Polish Volunteer Corps	Polish volunteers affiliated to the RVC.
	German Volunteer Corps	German volunteers affiliated to the RVC. Became a part of the 49th Infantry Battalion in 2025.
	Kastuś Kalinoŭski Regiment	Unit of Belarusian volunteers formed during the 2014 War in Donbas, maintains close ties with Sviatlana Tsikhanouskaya and the Belarusian opposition.
	Georgian Legion	Unit of Georgian volunteers formed during the 2014 War in Donbas, led by Mamuka Mamulashvili.
	NOMAD Unit	Composed of Indigenous people of various ethnic groups of the Russian federation.

== Summary of official international government responses ==
Country	Legality of citizens enlisting	Official Stance on International Legion	Ref
Algeria	Illegal	Algeria discourages its citizens from enlisting.	
Australia	Unclear	While legal for an Australian to fight for a foreign government, it may be unlawful to make preparations to do so due to a lack of legal precedent in the area.	
Austria	Illegal	It is illegal for Austrian citizens to enlist in the International Legion under Austrian law.	
Belarus	Illegal	It is illegal for Belarusian citizens to enlist in the International Legion. However, the Belarusian opposition leader, in exile in Poland, Sviatlana Tsikhanouskaya has endorsed Belarusians enlisting in the International Legion.	
Belgium	Legal	Belgium discourages its citizens from enlisting. However, it is legal for Belgian citizens to enlist under Belgian law.	
Cambodia	Unclear	Cambodia discourages its citizens from enlisting.	
Canada	Legal under certain circumstances	Canada allows its citizens to enlist in the International Legion, however Canadian law may technically bar joining a military at war with a "friendly state".	
Croatia	Legal under certain circumstances	Croatia allows participation in the war on the condition that the constitutional order of that country is not violated, its territorial integrity is undermined and mercenary is not involved.	
Czech Republic	Legal under certain circumstances	The Czech Republic allows its citizens to enlist in the International Legion after receiving permission from the Czech president.	
Denmark	Legal under certain circumstances	There is no law in Denmark that prohibits Danish citizens from enlisting the International Legion. Danish citizens however, are not allowed to fight in an armed conflict where Denmark is a party, and one fights on the side of the enemy.	
Estonia	Legal under certain circumstances	Prompted by Russia's attack against Ukraine Penal Codes have been amended to ensure an appropriate punishment for any person who takes part in aggression. Pursuant to the new laws, joining the armed forces of a foreign state committing an act of aggression or any other armed unit participating in an act of aggression committed by a foreign state, participation in the commission of or preparing an act of aggression by a foreign state as well as knowingly and directly, including financially supporting an act of aggression by a foreign state is punishable as a criminal offence. Under the Act, such an activity is punishable by imprisonment of up to five years. If such an act is committed by a legal person, it is punishable by a pecuniary punishment.	
Finland	Unclear	Finland discourages its citizens from enlisting.	
France	Legal	France allows its citizens to enlist in the International Legion.	
Georgia	Unclear	Georgia discourages its citizens from enlisting.	
Germany	Legal	German law does not forbid its citizens to enlist in the International Legion. However, attempting to recruit a German citizen into foreign military service is illegal.	
India	Illegal	It is illegal for Indian citizens to enlist in the International Legion under Indian law.	
Indonesia	Legal under certain circumstances	Indonesian citizens who enlist in a foreign military without permission from the president will lose their citizenship.	
Israel	Legal under certain circumstances	Israeli law has a provision forbidding citizens from joining a foreign military, with a potential punishment of up to three years in prison. This is not applicable if the State of Israel has an agreement with the foreign country in question. It is publicly unknown if there is an agreement with Ukraine, Israel's Foreign Ministry would not comment further. It is not illegal for a foreign country to recruit people in Israel.	
Japan	Unclear	Japan discourages its citizens from enlisting and the legality of Japanese citizens enlisting is unclear under Japanese law.	
Kosovo	Illegal	It is illegal for Kosovo citizens to enlist in the International Legion under Kosovo law.	
Latvia	Legal under certain circumstances	Latvia allows its citizens to enlist in the International Legion, if the person is not serving to national guard or national army.	
Moldova	Unclear	Moldova discourages its citizens from enlisting into the legion.	
Montenegro	Illegal	It is illegal for Montenegrin citizens to enlist in the International Legion under Montenegrin law.	
Netherlands	Legal under certain circumstances	The Netherlands discourages its citizens from enlisting and it is illegal for active-duty Dutch soldiers to enlist in the International Legion under Dutch law.	
New Zealand	Legal	New Zealand discourages its citizens from enlisting. However, it is legal for New Zealanders to enlist in the International Legion under New Zealand law.	
Nigeria	Illegal	Nigeria bars its citizens from enlisting in the International Legion.	
North Macedonia	Illegal	It is illegal for Macedonian citizens to enlist in the International Legion under Macedonian law.	
Norway	Legal	Norwegian citizens can legally enlist in the International Legion under Norwegian law. The Norwegian government reminds about dangers, rules and responsibilities.	
Pakistan	Unclear	Pakistan discourages its citizens from enlisting in the International Legion.	
Poland	Legal under certain circumstances	Polish citizens who want to enlist in the International Legion, or any other foreign army, must receive the approval of the Polish Minister of National Defense.	
Portugal	Legal	Although no law prohibits the Portuguese citizens from fighting for the International Legion, the Portuguese government does not encourage any citizen to do it.	
Romania	Legal	No law prohibits the Romanian citizens from fighting for the International Legion. The Romanian government does not encourage any citizen to do it, but does not discourage either. Local media glorifies those who went to fight.	
Russia	Illegal	Russia has stated foreign fighters (i.e. Russians fighting for Ukraine) are unlawful combatants entitled to no protection under the Geneva Conventions, captured foreign fighters will not be given prisoner of war status, and captured foreign fighters will be prosecuted as mercenaries.	
Senegal	Illegal	It is illegal for Senegalese citizens to enlist in the International Legion under Senegalese law.	
Serbia	Illegal	It is illegal for Serbian citizens to enlist in the International Legion under Serbian law.	
Singapore	Illegal	It is illegal for Singaporean citizens to enlist in the International Legion under Singaporean law.	
Slovakia	Legal under certain circumstances	Slovak citizens who want to join the International Legion must obtain a permit from the Slovak Republic before joining.	
South Africa	Unclear	The legality of enlisting in the International Legion is unclear under South African law.	
South Korea	Illegal	It is illegal for South Korean citizens to enlist in the International Legion under South Korean law.	
Spain	Legal under certain circumstances	Any Spaniard who is neither a soldier nor a member of the Security Corps and Forces may legally enlist in the International Legion.	
Sweden	Legal	There are no legal barriers to Swedish citizens volunteering in another country's military. However, members of the Swedish Armed Forces who do so risk losing their jobs, as they are deemed to be better needed at home.	
Switzerland	Illegal	It is illegal for Swiss citizens to enlist in the International Legion under Swiss law.	
Taiwan	Unclear	The government of the Republic of China discourages its citizens from enlisting.	
Thailand	Legal	Thailand discourages its citizens from enlisting. However, it is legal for Thai citizens to enlist under Thai law.	
Turkey	Unclear	According to Article 320 of the Turkish Penal Code, it is illegal to fight on behalf of any foreign government without the consent of the Turkish government. However, Turkey has refused to comment on its citizens enlisting in the International Legion. Turkish citizens who enlisted in the International Legion have not faced any prosecution as of 2025.	
United Kingdom	Illegal but unenforced	It is illegal for citizens of the United Kingdom to enlist in the International Legion under the Foreign Enlistment Act 1870. However, the last prosecution for violating the law was in 1896 and the government has not threatened its enforcement since the Spanish Civil War. Then Foreign Secretary Liz Truss made a public announcement in 2022 that the UK would support British citizens who choose to enlist, although the comment was later retracted and it was clarified that the government would only support those who have combat experience and are not serving members of the British Armed Forces.	
United States	Unclear	The United States discourages its citizens from enlisting in the International Legion. American law prohibits "a group organized as a military expedition from departing from the United States to take action as a military force against a nation with whom the United States is at peace", but does not "prevent individuals from leaving the United States to fight for a cause in which they believed."	
Uzbekistan	Illegal	It is illegal for Uzbek citizens to enlist in the International Legion.	
Vietnam	Illegal	It is illegal for Vietnamese citizens to enlist in the International Legion. Anyone who do will face a prison sentence of 5–15 years, according to Article 425 of the 2015 Vietnamese Penal Code.	

== International response ==
=== Afghanistan ===
On 2 May 2022, there were reports of Afghan refugees with combat experience in the disbanded Afghan special forces volunteering to fight with assistance from fellow Afghans who can speak Ukrainian and have settled in Ukraine permanently.

On 10 March 2023, most ex-Afghan soldiers trying to volunteer to Ukraine were being turned down out of concern that Wagner may use them to undermine the legion or may be trying to enter Ukraine as a way of traveling further to Europe to escape the Taliban. It was also reported that at least 150 ex-Kta Khas commandos also applied to join the legion.

=== Albania ===
Mamuka Mamulashvili, a commander of foreign volunteers in Ukraine, said in an interview with Euronews Albania on 3 March 2022 that there were currently two Albanians in the International Legion. Mamulashvili also claimed they were waiting on the arrival of about 20–30 other Albanian volunteers who have applied to join the war in Ukraine.

=== Algeria ===
In early March 2022, the Algerian government called on Ukraine to not enlist fighters from their country.

=== Argentina ===
On 13 March 2022, the Ukrainian embassy in Buenos Aires posted on its social media to recruit Argentinian citizens who wanted to join the International Legion. On 22 March, it was reported that an unknown number of Argentinians had signed up to join.

=== Australia ===
On 28 February 2022, when asked about Australians volunteering for Ukraine, then Prime Minister of Australia Scott Morrison told reporters "I would counsel against that purely for the safety of Australians that they would not travel to Ukraine," and "I would say at this time the legality of such actions are uncertain under Australian law."

As of 28 December 2022, four Australian volunteers had been killed in Ukraine.

=== Austria ===
Austrian law stipulates any citizen who enters into the military services of a foreign country has their citizenship revoked. In March 2022, Ministry of the Interior spokesman Harald Sörös confirmed that the government intends to prosecute any violators of the law. When asked whether the law would also be applied to Austrians providing only humanitarian assistance, Sörös responded it was "a matter for the courts to decide, not the executive." Austrian constitutional and administrative lawyer Heinz Mayer argued enforcement of the law could leave Austrians who attempt to join the International Legion or provide humanitarian assistance stateless.

In July 2022, Natalia Frauscher was reported to be the first Austrian volunteer killed in action.

=== Azerbaijan ===
On 11 April 2022, an Azerbaijani volunteer was killed fighting in the legion.

=== Belarus ===
On 9 March 2022, Euroradio.fm reported that Belarusians in Ukraine had formed the Kastuś Kalinoŭski Battalion with 200 volunteers, named after the Belarusian writer Kastuś Kalinoŭski. The battalion eventually grew to a regiment of over 1000 volunteers. It is not part of the International Legion in order to preserve greater autonomy.

On 30 March 2022, it was reported that more Belarusian volunteers would be assigned to another volunteer unit called the Pahonia Regiment.

=== Belgium ===
In Belgian law, it is not illegal for a Belgian citizen to enlist for service in a foreign army. However, Time reported on 7 March 2022 that Belgium was dissuading its veterans from joining the International Legion. The first contingent of seven volunteers left Belgium for Ukraine on 4 March and included two Belgian Turks and a Belgian veteran of the Afghanistan War as well as Eastern European immigrants.

The Ukrainian embassy in Brussels confirmed on 15 March that 18 Belgian residents had arrived in Ukraine to enlist in the international legion while a further 92 had expressed interest in joining. Among those who had made contact with the Ukrainian Embassy were said to be Italian, French, Moroccan, and Luxembourg nationals. At least two members of the Belgian Land Component disobeyed orders to enlist with the International Legion.

It was subsequently reported that two Belgians had been immediately despatched to the front-line while the remainder had been concentrated at Yavoriv military base at the time of its bombing on 13 March. It was subsequently reported on 23 March that "more than half" of the 18 had returned to Belgium, either to convalesce after the Yavoriv bombing or as a result of dissatisfaction with their conditions of service. Concerns were raised about the personal backgrounds and political profile of some of the Belgian volunteers.

According to De Morgen, 14 Belgians travelled to fight in Ukraine between February and June 2022. By this date, nine had returned home and two had apparently been killed in action. One of the two was a 27-year old Belgian Ukrainian called Artem Dymyd from Charleroi who had enlisted in the Ukrainian Army in 2014 and who was killed by rocket fire in Donetsk. One former Belgian soldier named as "Boris" suffered severe injuries.

=== Brazil ===
On 5 March 2022, a Brazilian newspaper reported that about 500 Brazilians were mobilizing on WhatsApp, Telegram and social networks groups to enlist. The Embassy of Ukraine in Brazil said that "it is not enlisting for the Ukrainian Foreign Legion" or "campaigning to join this military formation". The costs are up to US$1,5 thousand per person, including air tickets and documentation. There are over 600,000 people of Ukrainian descent living in Brazil.

As of 6 July 2022, three Brazilian volunteers had been killed fighting in Ukraine. André Hack Bahi was killed on 4 June while helping fellow volunteers escape during fighting in the Luhansk region. Thalita do Valle, a female model and ex-Kurdish Pershmerga volunteer was killed in Kharkiv on 30 June during an attack on a Ukrainian bunker, which also resulted in the death of Douglas Búrigo when he tried to look for her since she did not evacuate from the bunker in time. Brazilian diplomats confirmed the reports on 5 July.

=== Bulgaria ===
A Bulgarian citizen declared he intended to go to Ukraine to join the International Legion, according to the Telegraph newspaper. The announcement was made on Twitter by his acquaintance. According to her, there are other compatriots who also intend to fight in the service of Ukraine.

On 25 September 2022, Bulgarian National Assembly candidate Ivan Kalchev volunteered to participate with the legion in the Ukrainian counteroffensive.

=== Cambodia ===
In early March 2022, then Cambodian Prime Minister Hun Sen urged Cambodians not to travel to Ukraine and fight with Ukrainians in the legion.

=== Canada ===
The 1937 Foreign Enlistment Act, enacted during the Spanish Civil War, prohibits Canadians from joining a foreign volunteer force against Canada's allies. In March 2022, Minister of National Defence Anita Anand noted that "the legalities of the situation are indeterminate at this time." The government had announced that it is up to individual Canadians to decide whether they want to join and that they "respect personal choices", though the government "is not facilitating" Canadians who are looking to join the International Legion.

Canada is home to the second-largest population of the Ukrainian diaspora after Russia. Due to a high number of Canadian volunteers, a separate Canadian battalion within the Legion, the Canadian Ukrainian Brigade, was established to avoid language barriers and logistics issues. In early March, it claimed that it has recruited at least 600 people. A second formation of Canadian and British volunteers was formed under the name Norman Brigade. It is not part of Ukraine's official International Legion. A former Royal 22nd Regiment sniper nicknamed "Wali" from Montreal, called "Canada's deadliest sniper" after deployments in Syria, Afghanistan and Iraq, also arrived in Ukraine to join the fight against Russia. He returned to Canada after two months.

Some of the soldiers in the Norman Brigade are concerned on whether the Norman Brigade's leader, nom de guerre Hrulf, is incompetent in managing the unit.

=== China ===
In November 2024, Peng Chenliang from Yunnan Province was reported killed in action while under the 1st Infantry Battalion. Peng was an ex-drone instructor back in China. He is the only known Chinese national who signed up to join the legion after he came to Ukraine due to being detained in China after posting comments on X that were anti-Russian, pro-Ukraine and pro-Taiwan.

=== Chile ===
Since early March 2022, there have been reports of volunteers trying to join the International Legion in Ukraine. TVN a Chilean public service broadcaster made an interview with one of the volunteers. Later in March various Chilean media spread the story of Luis Lagos, a former member of the Carabineros de Chile who joined the legion.

=== Colombia ===
On 4 March 2022, Colombian newspaper El Espectador reported that at least 50 former Colombian soldiers will join the International Legion in Ukraine. El Espectador managed to get in touch with one of the former Colombian soldiers, identified as Camilo Sánchez, who said in the interview he and the group of ex-soldiers had contacted a Ukrainian military official to enlist.

On 23 July 2022, the first Colombian casualty was an ex-Colombian police officer named Christian Camilo Márquez was killed fighting in Izyum. On 24 July 2023, an ex-soldier named Édisson Giraldo was killed in action.

=== Costa Rica ===
On 10 September 2023, ex-Public Force officer Roy Eduardo Rojas Espinoza was killed in action. The officer had been a member of the Ministry of Public Security of the Goicoechea Canton from 2007 to 2018

=== Croatia ===
Croatian law penalizes organizing the departure or going to war in another country if it violates the constitutional order of that country, undermines the territorial integrity of the country and if the person is a mercenary.

Prior to the formation of International Legion, Balkan Insight reported that 20–30 Croatians joined the Ukrainian Azov Battalion to fight in the War in the Donbas in 2014–2015.

==== Post-formation ====
On 27 February 2022, Croatian Prime Minister Andrej Plenković commented on news of the possible departure of Croatian volunteers to Ukraine after the announcement of the formation of the International Legion, saying "Every departure to Ukraine is an act of individuals and they take personal responsibility".

On 28 February, it was reported by Dnevnik.hr and Balkan Insight that Croatian fighters were already in Ukraine and more were intending to join them. Some volunteers cited Ukraine's quickness to recognize Croatia's independence in 1991 as a causus belli to join Ukraine.

The Croatian military envoy to Moscow Željko Akrap was summoned to the Russian Defense Ministry on 2 March 2022 and 3 March 2022 over allegations that 200 Croatian volunteers had joined the Ukrainian army. During the second call, the Russian side tried to hand over a protest note to Akrap but he refused to take it.

=== Cuba ===
The Embassy of Ukraine in Havana attempted to recruit for the International Legion in March 2022. Despite this attempt, most Cuban fighters in Ukraine fight for the Russian side, being recruited with the promise of Russian citizenship or a high salary. Despite this situation, the Ministry of Foreign Affairs strongly rejected the recruitment of fighters for any of the sides involved.

=== Czech Republic ===
Citizens of the Czech Republic are allowed to join other countries' armed forces as foreign volunteers if they get an approval by the president of the Czech Republic. On 28 February, the president Miloš Zeman stated he would be in favor of allowing potential volunteers to join the newly formed Ukrainian legion. The Ministry of Defence has already reported its first applicants.

It is reported that 600 Czechs have joined the legion as volunteers.

=== Denmark ===
Prime Minister Mette Frederiksen said on 27 February 2022, that volunteering was "a choice anyone could make."

On 10 March, the Ukrainian Ambassador in Denmark reported that more than 100 Danes had volunteered.

On 7 April, an anonymous Danish volunteer soldier claimed to have killed 100 Russian soldiers during various operations.

On 26 April, a 25 year old was the first Dane to have been confirmed killed in combat.

=== Ecuador ===
The Honorary Consul of Ukraine in Ecuador announced on 8 March 2022, that approximately 850 Ecuadorians had contacted the consulate and the Embassy of Ukraine in Lima attempting to volunteer with the International Legion. Finally, the Ukrainian consul in Ecuador mentioned that “The Ecuadorian State, the Ministry of Foreign Affairs or any department of the State have no involvement in this matter. Even less with financial or any other kind of support. It is a voluntary effort and it is not up to any State institution to suggest it, encourage it or promote it.”

=== Estonia ===
The parliamentary groups of Estonia's Riigikogu are currently debating whether to allow Estonian citizens to volunteer to fight for Ukraine.

Minister of Justice Maris Lauri (Reform) said on Monday that Estonian law is unclear in regards to serving in a foreign military and whether doing so is punishable."Based on Estonian laws, nobody can be punished as soon as they go to serve a foreign country," Lauri said. "We don't have a single clause that states that a person should be punished or that they must for example be granted permission or that they must go through some kind of procedure in order to go volunteer."

The justice minister did note, however, that rules exist according to which if someone joins another country's military to fight, then they should inform the state and be granted specific permission to do so. Should anyone go fight on the Russian side, she added, then that is a punishable offense.

"If these are people who are residing in Estonia on the basis of a visa or residence permit, then they simply cannot come back here again," Lauri explained. "And if people come back who received [Estonian] citizenship via naturalization, then they may be stripped of their citizenship."

She added that anyone who has gone to fight who commits war crimes will likewise face punishment.

According to the minister, this matter was scheduled to be discussed at a government meeting in March 2022 as well.

On 30 August 2022, President Zelenskyy awarded German Barinov with the Order of Courage, 3rd Class.

On 7 March 2023, Ivo Jurak, was the first known Estonian volunteer fighter who got killed in the Battle of Bakhmut.

=== Finland ===
Finland's Ministry for Foreign Affairs has said that it has no information regarding how many people from Finland have left to join the fight in Ukraine. "The Foreign Ministry's travel bulletin recommends leaving Ukraine immediately. The ministry is highly limited in its ability to assist Finns in the war zone," ministry representatives told Yle in an email.

According to a report in March 2022 by Helsingin Sanomat, the Finnish Defence Forces does not recommend or advise Finns to apply to fight for a foreign cause.

=== France ===
Hervé Grandjean, a spokesperson for France's Ministry for the Armed Forces, said individual volunteers could be "integrated in a body of Ukrainian volunteers" and "we cannot prevent them from leaving, (but) nor can we sanction that type of project." However, under French law, France can order a five-year jail term for "mercenaries" who are "specifically recruited to fight in an armed conflict," are neither "from a state involved in the armed conflict" or a "member of such state's military," and who are paid to "participate or try to participate in the hostilities."

A significant response has been reported in France to Zelenskyy's call for foreign fighters, with online interest estimated in the thousands, and some having already gone to Ukraine as of 3 March. The French Foreign Legion prevents current serving legionnaires from serving in Ukraine.

As of 9 July 2022, two French volunteers had been killed in action.

=== Germany ===
On 2 March, Minister of the Interior Nancy Faeser and Minister of Justice Marco Buschmann declared the Federal Government would not prevent its own citizens from going to Ukraine to fight in the war. These persons also would not face criminal prosecution. This applies to potential missions for both Ukrainians and Russians. The German Federal Police specified they would not let right-wing extremists travel to Ukraine.

=== Georgia ===
On 28 February 50 Georgian volunteers arrived in Ukraine. "A group of Georgian volunteers arrived in Ukraine to help the wounded in Ukraine and, if necessary, to take part in hostilities. About 50 people managed to enter Ukraine by crossing the Sarpi customs point. They left for Ukraine on February 28."- Georgian Radio Free reported.

Due to Georgia already having had military conflicts with Russia in the 1992 Abkhazian War and 2008 War, many Georgians sympathized with Ukrainians and therefore went to help. Georgians and Ukrainians have a history of sending volunteers to each other's countries during times of conflict or helping each other in political and humanitarian matters during the aforementioned wars. Georgians have supported Ukraine since the start of the Russo-Ukrainian conflicts. Ukraine has already established a battalion of Georgian fighters called the Georgian Legion since the War in Donbas, but new volunteers would be stationed in the newly formed International Legion of Territorial Defence of Ukraine.

On 1 March, a new batch of volunteers was to fly to Ukraine but the Georgian government canceled their flight. In response, Ukrainian president Volodymyr Zelenskyy denounced the Georgian government's "immoral position" and has recalled Ukraine's ambassador to Georgia.

Former Georgian Defense Minister, Irakli Okruashvili with some volunteers also traveled to Ukraine and joined the call to arms to defend Ukraine against Russia. His squad then joined the International Legion.

=== Greece ===
The Ukrainian embassy in Athens, in early March 2022, received dozens of requests from Greek citizens and Ukrainian diaspora asking for information on how they could join the International Legion.

=== Hong Kong ===
The participation of any Hong Konger in the international legion was first officially documented in a thank-you video posted on Twitter on 18 December 2022 by the Ukrainian Ministry of Defence. In that video, the Ukrainian military thanked the 20,000 volunteers from more than 50 countries. Before being deleted, the video featured the national flags of the home countries of the volunteers, including the Black Bauhinia flag of Hong Kong. The black flag is actually not the official flag of Hong Kong but a modified version that was widely used by pro-democracy protesters during the 2019–2020 Hong Kong protests. The gratitude video prompted strong criticism from the Chinese and Hong Kong governments.

=== Hungary ===
Sky News reported at least one Hungarian, Akos Horvath, traveled to Ukraine to join the International Legion in March 2022.

=== India ===
The Ukrainian Embassy in India tweeted asking Indians to volunteer to fight for Ukraine in early March 2022, but it was later deleted after the Indian Ministry of External Affairs objected. Indian domestic law clearly bars foreign fighters under Chapter VI, Section 121-130 of the Indian Penal Code. Foreign fighters can be sentenced to up to seven years upon return to India.

Over 500 Indians from across the country, including some veterans have submitted applications volunteering to join the International Legion created to fight Russian forces in Ukraine.

However, only one 21-year-old Indian student in Kharkiv is known to have joined the Georgian National Legion in 2022. Later on, the student's family said that the student is willing to leave the Georgian National Legion and return to his home in India.

The first photo of International Legion distributed by Ukraine reportedly showed an Indian volunteer. The Indian volunteer reportedly shown in the photo is believed to be the 21-year-old student who had joined the Georgian National Legion earlier on.

=== Iran ===
Sky News reported in early March 2022 that at least one Iranian had traveled to Ukraine to join the International Legion.

In March 2025, Iranian journalist Kourosh Sehati said in an interview with RFE/RL that he had applied to join the foreign legion, citing both political and personal reasons.

=== Ireland ===
Brendan Murphy, an Irish businessman fleeing Ukraine stated in an interview published 2 March 2022 that Irish people had already arrived in the country to fight with the International Legion. He said: "The first Irish veterans – they have to have military experience – arrived in Ukraine last night, which is good to see because they have the Irish tricolor on their arm".

Rory Mason was the first Irish volunteer killed in the Kharkiv region in late September or early October 2022. In late April 2023, Finbar Cafferkey was killed fighting in the Battle of Bakhmut.

=== Israel ===
Ukrainian initiatives to recruit Israelis began on 26 February in tandem with thousands of Israelis protesting against the 2022 Russian invasion of Ukraine.

Many protesters had connections to Ukraine or other post-Soviet countries, but also a significant contingent of Israelis attended with no connection to the former USSR at all.

The Ukrainian Embassy focused on recruiting Israelis through its Facebook page.

By early March, it was reported that Israelis had been recruited and were heading to Ukraine. Most were veterans of the Israel Defense Forces (IDF), and were primarily of Ukrainian, Russian, or other former USSR roots, but not exclusively so, with recruits of Druze Israeli and American-Israeli backgrounds also noted.

On 25 March, it was reported by the Israeli national newspaper Yedioth Ahronoth that a group of former IDF soldiers were training Ukrainian civilians; the ex-commando in charge stated to journalists that the program originated as a rescue mission for Ukraine's Jewish population but changed as the Ukrainian Jews required armed escorts and then military training. Yedioth Ahronoth reported that an unidentified Israeli official stated that the Israeli defense establishment was "looking the other way", in part because of the increasingly pro-Ukrainian sentiments and growing suspicion toward Russia, the official himself noting his own solidarity toward Ukraine in the face of "the worst kind of Russian aggression".

On 1 September 2022, Israeli citizen Dmitry Fialka was killed fighting in eastern Ukraine.

=== Italy ===
Prior to the formation of the International Legion, about 50 to 60 Italian nationals travelled to Ukraine as foreign fighters before the 2022 Russian invasion of Ukraine. 25 to 30 supported Ukraine and 25 to 30 supported the Donbas separatists.

On 2 March 2022, the Ukraine Consulate in Milan posted on Facebook inviting Italians to join the International Legion, but the post was later deleted. Italian law does not forbid enlistment in a foreign army, although there are provisions banning the organization of said enlistment, as well as mercenaries.

Giulia Schiff, an ex-Italian Air Force pilot, was reported to be in Kyiv after she enlisted with the legion's special forces unit.

On 20 September 2022, Benjamin Giorgio Galli, an Italian volunteer was killed in combat against Russian troops.

=== Japan ===
On 1 March, Foreign Minister Yoshimasa Hayashi said, "I am aware that the Embassy of Ukraine in Japan is calling for such (volunteer soldiers), but I would like you to refrain from traveling to Ukraine, regardless of your purpose."

As of 2 March 2022, 70 Japanese men have applied to be volunteers of the volunteer foreign legion. Of these, 50 were former members of the Japan Self-Defense Forces and two are former members of the French Foreign Legion. It was reported that an unnamed company in Tokyo assisted the Embassy in recruiting potential candidates.

According to lawyers interviewed, a Japanese person who works under a foreign military to wage war against another country could potentially be charged under Article 93 of the Penal Code. The law, however, has only been used against Japanese nationals who were arrested for plans to work under ISIL.

On 16 March, CNN Turkey reported that three Japanese nationals with military experience were allowed to enter Ukraine. On 7 November, Asahi Shimbun interviewed an anonymous Japanese volunteer who joined the legion with minimal military experience.

On 11 August, Russian Defense Ministry reports claim that nine Japanese nationals are in the legion while one left Ukraine.

On 11 November, Tokyo has confirmed that a Japanese volunteer was killed fighting Russian troops, in only days after mourning his Taiwanese comrade's death in the Luhansk front.

=== Kosovo ===
Kosovar law bars participation in foreign armed groups. Despite this two Kosovar citizens reportedly travelled to join the International Legion in early March 2022.

Several members of the Kosovar diaspora in Switzerland reportedly contacted the embassy in Bern in early March 2022 to join the International Legion.

=== Latvia ===
The Saeima of Latvia unanimously approved immunity from prosecution for Latvian volunteers who wish to join combat on the side of the Ukrainian military.

On 8 March 2022, member of the Saeima Juris Jurašs of the New Conservative Party volunteered to fight with fellow Latvians in Ukraine.

=== Lithuania ===
On 7 March 2022, Time reported an estimated 200 Lithuanians have registered to fight with the Ukrainian embassy.

The first photo of International Legion distributed by Ukraine reportedly showed Lithuanian volunteers.

=== Malaysia ===
In late February 2022, The Star reported that at least two Malaysians stayed in Ukraine and joined the Territorial Defense Force in Kyiv.

=== Mexico ===
In early March 2022, the State Service of Special Communications and Information Protection of Ukraine reported Mexican volunteers had joined the International Legion in defense of Kyiv. The first photo distributed by Ukraine of the International Legion reportedly showed Mexican volunteers.

In March 2024, the Russian embassy in México confirmed in a statement the presence of eight Mexican fighters in Ukraine, of which were three have been killed in action. Despite the statement, the Secretariat of National Defense do not have information about former members of the army who have traveled to Ukraine to joining on the Legion.

=== Moldova ===
The Prime Minister of Moldova, Natalia Gavrilița, was asked during a press conference on 28 February 2022 whether citizens of Moldova can join the International Legion. She responded "We are a neutral country and we will act in the light of neutrality. The Government of the Republic of Moldova is not involved in such actions."

By April 2022 dozens of Moldovan citizens were fighting in Ukraine against the Russian occupiers, most of them enlisted in the Ukrainian army in the first few days of the war. In a statement made by a group of Moldovans fighting on the front in Ukraine, in November 2022, the number is more than 300 Moldovan citizens in the International Legion.

=== Montenegro ===
In March 2022, the Democratic Front urged the Montenegrin authorities to take action to stop the recruitment of volunteer fighters for the war in Ukraine, after the Ukrainian Embassy in Podgorica posted on Facebook calling for foreign volunteers for the International Legion. Montenegrin law criminalizes participation in foreign conflicts and those convicted face prison sentences of up to ten years.

=== Netherlands ===
Minister of Defence Kajsa Ollongren advised Dutch nationals not to travel to Ukraine saying "The country's travel advice is red. It is extremely dangerous." Additionally, Dutch military code bars active Dutch soldiers from joining a foreign army and Dutch law bars civilians from enlisting in an enemy army in a war in which the Netherlands participates. However, it may be legal for Dutch civilians to join the International Legion.

On 4 March 2022, the Ukrainian embassy in the Hague declined to comment on the number of Dutch volunteers. As of 7 March 2022, it is estimated around 200 Dutchmen have attempted to join the legion at the Ukrainian embassy in The Hague. According to the Ukrainian embassy's national coordinator for the International Legion, Gert Snitselaar, 40 volunteers have departed the Netherlands for Ukraine.

There have already been reports of some Dutch casualties in the fighting around Lviv and Kyiv. Gert Snitselaar states: "I was in contact with a few (volunteers) this morning, but since then there has been no communication," In response to the bombing of Lviv. He is certain Dutch citizens have perished during the fighting. However, no indication of the number of casualties has been given.

The Dutch government stated in 2024 that they have no information on how many volunteers are currently fighting in Ukraine, or how many have been killed.

Three Dutch volunteers have been killed since the start of the conflict. The first official Dutch casualty of the war perished on 4 May 2022. On 20 September 2022, it was reported that another Dutch volunteer was killed in Kharkiv. The third Dutch casualty died on 20 May 2024 in Chasiv Yar.

=== New Zealand ===
New Zealand officially has a "do not travel" warning issued for Ukraine and the Ukrainian consul in Auckland, Oleksandr Kirichuk, says he cannot assist New Zealanders in travelling to Ukraine. Despite this he says over 500 New Zealanders have attempted to volunteer to fight in Ukraine against Russia.

The New Zealand Herald reported on an ex-British Army/New Zealand Army veteran (and PR citizen) recruited to the legion, though the unnamed veteran said that he will use his British passport to travel.

On 25 August 2022, Dominic Abelen was reported as the first New Zealand volunteer to be killed in action in the legion, who joined while on leave from the New Zealand military. It was further reported that Abelen was recruited to the LSSG. Later details released in February 2023 reported that Abelen and his team had entered a tactically important tree line, where after a friendly fire incident with the Ukrainian 72nd Mechanized Brigade and close-quarters fighting with Russian soldiers, Abelen was shot and killed instantly while attempting to withdraw. During the fighting, Abelen's team killed at least a dozen Russian soldiers. Abelen's body was reported to have been returned to Ukraine in March 2025. On 11 March 2025, the International Legion of the Defence Intelligence of Ukraine reported that Abelen had been part of the unit, and that he had been given military honors and posthumously awarded the DIU's "Ukraine is Above All" insignia and the "For Combat Merit" medal.

=== Nigeria ===
On 7 March 2022, Nigeria's Ministry of Foreign Affairs declared that Nigerian citizens are not allowed to serve as mercenaries or foreign volunteers for Ukraine. It has been reported that an unknown number of Nigerians wish to join the legion in Ukraine.

=== North Macedonia ===
On 8 March 2022 the Ukrainian Embassy posted an appeal on social media for volunteers to join the International legion. However, Macedonian law bars joining foreign armies. There have been no reported cases of Macedonian citizens going to Ukraine to join the International Legion.

=== Norway ===
On 7 March 2022, Time reported the Ukrainian embassy in Norway estimated 300 Norwegian nationals had signed up to volunteer at their embassy.

On 13 December 2023, it was reported that a Norwegian volunteer was killed in action.

=== Peru ===
A Peruvian former soldier discharged from the Peruvian army, César Eduardo Pérez Farfán, is reported to have traveled to Ukraine to join the International legion with 13 other Peruvians. In June 2024, the Peruvian newspaper El Comercio interviewed Juan Olivas, the Economic and Commercial Attaché of Peru in Ukraine, who confirmed the death of five Peruvian volunteers and the disappearance of one. He said that the body of one volunteer was returned, while the other four were cremated.

=== Poland ===
Polish citizens may join the army of foreign countries only after approval of a written application by the Polish Ministry of National Defense. There are several formal conditions that must be met in order to issue a permit. Among others, one cannot currently be in active military service and joining the army of a foreign country cannot violate the interests of the Republic of Poland. A group of at least 30 people in Poland who were willing to join the International Legion have reportedly organized to begin training.

=== Portugal ===
The Government of Ukraine stated on 4 March 2022 that "some Portuguese" were already fighting in the International Legion of Territorial Defence. Sniper unit former Ranger force COE. Vitaliy Mukhin, spokesman for the Government, did not specify the concrete number of Portuguese who are already in Ukrainian territory.

On 1 June 2025, news outlets reported that Portuguese 23-year-old Jerónimo Guerreiro, a former paratrooper and volunteer firefighter, had been killed in action near Russian-controlled Kupiansk while fighting with the International Legion. José Cesário, Secretary of State for the Portuguese Communities treated reports as credible, but unconfirmed, and assured the Portuguese embassy in Kyiv was making all possible efforts to retrieve the remains.

=== Romania ===
Dozens of Romanians sent messages to the Ukrainian embassy in Bucharest to be accepted into the International Legion. Russian sources deemed sufficiently credible by the Romanian military press have claimed that over 700 Romanians are fighting in Ukraine [as of July 2023]. At least one highly skilled sniper is known to have been fighting and was profiled by the local CNN affiliate.

=== Russia ===
Ukraine has said some former Russian soldiers have switched sides and have now joined Kyiv's forces. The Ukrainian defense ministry said on its Telegram channel on 30 March that commanders of the Freedom of Russia Legion were visiting detained former Russian military personnel "in order to select those who wish to serve."

On 3 March 2022, Russian Defense Ministry spokesman Igor Konashenkov warned that foreign fighters would be treated as unlawful combatants entitled to no protection under the Geneva Conventions, meaning captured foreign fighters will not be given prisoner of war status and will be prosecuted as mercenaries.

=== Senegal ===
On 3 March, Senegal's foreign ministry condemned a social media post by the country's Ukrainian embassy calling for volunteers as illegal under Senegalese law. The Ukrainian ambassador to Senegal was summoned and asked to take down the post.

It was reported that 36 Senegalese nationals attempted to volunteer at the Ukrainian embassy in Dakar.

In a BBC Focus Africa program on 23 June 2022, Russian Ministry of Defense officials claimed that four Senegalese volunteers were killed while under Ukrainian command.

=== Serbia ===
Serbian law bars its nationals from participation in foreign conflicts. In March 2022, Serbian president Aleksandar Vučić said "As for volunteers, since both sides have called for volunteers, the Serbian criminal code – and we will amend it to be stricter – outlaws participation in any conflicts that do not defend Serbia's territorial integrity," and "Any of those who think they should take part in some war, we will punish severely in accordance with our constitution and our laws."

Nevertheless, a spokesman for the International Legion confirmed that there indeed are a number of Serb volunteers in the legion and that they are fighting alongside other volunteers.

=== Singapore ===
Vivian Balakrishnan, Singaporean Minister of Foreign Affairs, said during a Parliament session on 22 February that Singaporeans must only fight for Singaporean national security interests and not fight in other places even for noble reasons.

The Singaporean Ministry of Home Affairs has stated that Singaporeans who are in Ukraine are potentially liable for any criminal offences committed outside Singapore, especially when fighting Russian-backed forces, with offenders liable for imprisonment from 15 years to life with fines included.

=== Slovakia ===
Some Slovak citizens have indicated they want to go fight in the International Legion, according to Minister of Defense Jaroslav Naď. However, it is illegal for Slovak citizens to join a foreign army without a permit from the Slovak government.

=== South Africa ===
It is unclear whether volunteering for foreign military service is illegal under South African law. The 1998 Regulation of Foreign Military Assistance Act was passed to "regulate the rendering of foreign military assistance" by South Africans, but was largely referred to as a "mercenary bill" targeting former apartheid soldiers working as mercenaries. The 2006 Prohibition of Mercenary Activities and Regulation of Certain Activities in Country of Armed Conflict Act amended the bill, but appears to have never been enforced.

On 11 March 2022, Ukraine's ambassador to South Africa, Liubov Abravitova, announced she is waiting on a legal ruling from the Department of International Relations and Cooperation on whether or not Ukraine may actively recruit South Africans to join the International Legion. Abravitova told the Cape Town Press Club, on 11 March, that anyone who wanted to join Ukraine's fight against Russia was welcome. She added that Ukrainian president Volodymyr Zelenskyy's idea was not new since France already had a foreign legion. She also said the embassy in Pretoria had received hundreds of requests to volunteer from people from across the region, including Madagascar, Mauritius, Zimbabwe, Namibia, Zambia, and Botswana.

The National Post reported that at least one South African national was recruited into the Norman Brigade.

=== South Korea ===
On 7 March 2022, the Ukrainian Embassy in Seoul reported it had received some 100 applications from South Korean volunteers. Various news sources claim a well-known South Korean Navy SEAL team is already in Ukraine fighting, which includes YouTube/TV celebrity Ken Rhee. The Ukrainian Embassy declined to verify the number of South Korean volunteer soldiers who have departed for Ukraine, citing "security reasons".

The Republic of Korea Marine Corps reported on 22 March 2022 that a Marine from the 1st Marine Division deserted from his unit and traveled to Ukraine to fight with the Legion. State Border Guard Service of Ukraine guards prohibited him from entering after Seoul passed information about him going AWOL before crossing the Polish-Ukrainian border. On 28 March, it was reported the deserter evaded being arrested and was on his way to join the legion.

Damien Magrou reported to South Korean media on 28 March that South Korean volunteers are already deployed and fighting Russian troops.

On 30 March, Ken Rhee mentioned that he was involved in creating volunteer-based special forces units in cooperation with the Ukrainian military. In May 2022, Rhee had been deployed in various special forces operations, working with other volunteers with special forces background with the Ukrainian Spetsnaz. On 20 May, Rhee was reported to be injured in the field, but was expected to make a recovery when he goes back to South Korea. Rhee mentioned that he is willing to be investigated by the police over his presence in Ukraine and has politely turned down Ukrainian nationality. The Seoul Metropolitan Police Agency is in the process of adding his name to a no-fly list.

On 18 June 2022, the South Korean government is checking claims that four South Korean nationals are killed in action fighting with the legion. The report also mentioned that 13 South Koreans are working in the legion.

On 23 February 2023, anonymous South Korean volunteers were interviewed, including a volunteer named Kim who used to be a commando with the Republic of Korea Army Special Warfare Command and last worked under the NIS for nine years before he went to Ukraine.

On 8 July 2023, Kim Jae-kyung was reported to have returned from Ukraine, serving in the 3rd Battalion of the International Legion as a combat medic/drone gunner. He has been campaigning in Seoul to spare any stockpiled ammo from the South Korean military to Ukraine to help in its counteroffensive.

=== Spain ===
On 7 March 2022, Time reported Spanish nationals had enlisted at the Ukrainian consulate in Barcelona.

=== Sri Lanka ===
In July 2022, ex-Sri Lankan commando Sylvester Andrew Ranish Hewage, known as "Dentist", was deployed to the field in Kharkiv. In December 2023, the Sri Lankan Embassy in Turkey confirmed that Hewage was killed alongside two other Sri Lankan volunteers. According to Sri Lankan Foreign Minister Ali Sabry, he said that the person who helped them go to Kyiv was being "dealt with".

=== Sweden ===
Very shortly after the appeal for volunteers several hundreds of Swedish military volunteers enlisted in the International Legion for Ukraine, according to the Swedish newspaper Svenska Dagbladet. On 25 March 2022, TT News Agency reported that 678 Swedes were already on the ground fighting the Russian forces in Ukraine.

The first photo distributed by Ukraine of the International Legion reportedly showed Swedish volunteers.

=== Switzerland ===
In early March, 35 people contacted the Ukrainian Embassy in Bern to join the international legion, according to Radio Télévision Suisse. Among these volunteers, three people are of Swiss nationality.

According to Article 94 of the Swiss Military Penal Code, such service is prohibited for Swiss without permission of the Federal Council, under penalty of a fine or imprisonment for a maximum of three years.

On 5 May 2022, a Swiss national and two French nationals were reported to be traveling to Ukraine to join the legion.

On 12 February 2024, it was reported that a Swiss national was killed in action fighting with Ukrainian troops.

=== Syria ===
Some members of groups opposing Bashar al-Assad in the Syrian Civil War have attempted to travel to Ukraine, motivated by Russia's support of the Assad regime.

=== Taiwan ===
Taiwan's Ministry of Foreign Affairs responded a question in a press conference regarding the official stance towards any Taiwanese national who wants to join the International Legion in the war of Ukraine, stated "the government's consistent position is to call on all Taiwanese nationals to avoid traveling to Ukraine, due to the deteriorating situation in there." "The government fully understands the sentiment of its nationals who want to stand for righteousness and give their support to Ukraine. However, on the standpoint of protecting the safety of its people and the risk of war, the government advises its nationals to avoid going there." and reiterated "in order to urge Russia to stop its military aggression against Ukraine, Taiwan will participate in the economic sanctions imposed on Russia along with the international community."

Due to the lack of formal diplomatic relations between Ukraine and Taiwan, no diplomatic missions were established in either side. The Representative Office of Poland in Taipei suggested that the Taiwanese volunteers first need to travel to Poland, and enlist with the Ukrainian Embassy in Warsaw, but the Polish Office in Taipei declined to comment when the press tried to verify, neither confirm nor deny that such information is held.

On 22 March, a Taiwanese Amis volunteer named Wang Jui-ti traveled to Helsinki to hand his application to join the Legion. On 29 March, he said that the application was not successful because the legion changed its requirements for volunteers to have military experience with combat exposure. However, he was advised by Ukrainian embassy staff in Vilnius, Lithuania to instead help the refugees in Poland.

On 10 April, it was reported that a Taiwanese man named Wang Nan-ying (known as Naive Wang), who lived in Kharkiv for eight years, enlisted in the legion after the war started while helping refugees in Poland. He is fluent in Ukrainian and Russian aside from English, Japanese and Mandarin.

On 13 May, an ex-Taiwanese marine is reported to have been recruited in the legion and is deployed in Eastern Ukraine.

As of 3 July, around 10 Taiwanese nationals were recruited to the legion.

On 2 November, a 25-year-old Taiwanese indigenous veteran Tseng Sheng-guang serving in Carpathian Sich Battalion, was reported as the first East Asian soldier killed in action in the war, after covering 3 colleagues to retreat under a tank siege during the eastern Ukraine campaign in Luhansk Oblast. In November 2024, a second Taiwanese volunteer named Wu Chung-ta was killed in Eastern Ukraine by Russian artillery bombardment.

=== Thailand ===
The Thai government stated that there is no law that bans Thai citizens from volunteering to fight in foreign legions, but they should "consider the potential grave danger as Russian forces pound Ukrainian cities with heavy weapons."

Over 2,000 pro-democracy activists in Thailand have attempted to sign up to join the International Legion. However the Ukrainian embassy in Bangkok did not confirm how many had successfully volunteered for the International Legion.

On 18 March 2022, Ukrainian chargé d'affaires Oleksandr Lysak spoke to Thai-based reporters in Bangkok and told them that the Ukrainian military has not recruited any Thais to work in the legion.

=== Turkey ===
According to Article 320 of the Turkish Penal Code, Turkish citizens who enlist for any foreign government without the consent of the Turkish government are punished with imprisonment.

In 2022, Turkish news reports have confirmed some Turkish citizens and members of the Turkish diaspora had attempted to join the International legion. Some Turkish nationals in Ukraine have been turned away from the International Legion. A Turkish citizen who has been living in Ukraine said he had signed up for the foreign legion along with 6 other Turkish citizens but they were later rejected. He claimed that the Turkish authorities had asked Ukraine not to accept any Turkish citizens into its Foreign Legion.

In a 2025 interview, a spokesperson for Turkish citizens who fight in the 3rd Battalion stated that no lawsuits have been filed by the Turkish government regarding their enlistment.

=== United Kingdom ===
In February 2022, Liz Truss, then Foreign Secretary of the United Kingdom said: "The people of Ukraine are fighting for freedom and democracy, not just for Ukraine but also for the whole of Europe because that is what President Vladimir Putin is challenging. And absolutely, if people want to support that struggle, I would support them in doing that." However, then prime minister Boris Johnson's office did not endorse Truss's statement. The statement was also criticized by several politicians who said volunteers may be in violation of the Foreign Enlistment Act 1870. It has been reported those who travel to Ukraine may be acting in contravention of UK anti-terrorism laws, though legal experts said prosecution would be unlikely owing to the UK government's support for Ukraine's armed resistance.

Ukrainian sources said 6,000 Britons had registered an interest in joining. The Times reported that over 150 former paratroopers who served in the War in Afghanistan had joined and were travelling to the front line. UK military officials instructed regular and reserve personnel not to travel to Ukraine.

On 9 March, a 19-year old Coldstream Guard soldier left his barracks at Windsor, Berkshire and traveled to Poland in order to enlist with the legion. He was detained upon his return to the UK on 21 March.

The first photo distributed by Ukraine of the International Legion reportedly showed volunteers from the United Kingdom.

On 15 August 2022, three captured British citizens, two International Legion volunteers and an aid worker, pleaded not guilty to charges of fighting as mercenaries in a court in the Donetsk People's Republic. The same court had previously passed death sentences on two British members of regular Ukrainian units, under the same charges.

In September 2022, five British nationals, including two who were sentenced to death, were freed from Russian captivity in a prisoner swap with Ukrainian forces. Aiden Aslin, John Harding, Dylan Healy, Andrew Hill and Shaun Pinner all returned home to the UK.

In February 2025, ex-MP Jack Lopresti gave his first interview after he enlisted to serve in the legion in November 2024. He is assigned to work in foreign relations and diplomacy, weapons procurement, and liaising with war veterans and charities.

As of January 2023, eight British volunteer fighters and aid workers were known to be killed in Ukraine. Scott Sibley was killed on 22 April 2022, during fighting in Mykolaiv from mortar bombardment while 19-year-old Jordan Gatley was killed in fighting against Russian troops in Severodonetsk alongside Ukrainian troops. Craig Mackintosh was killed on 24 August 2022, while working as a volunteer medic. Ex-Army reservist and dual Ukrainian-British national Viktor Yatsunyk was killed by a landmine in Izium. Simon Lingard died of shrapnel wounds after his unit came under attack from Russian forces. Chris Parry and Andrew Bagshaw were killed whilst attempting a humanitarian evacuation of civilians in eastern Ukraine. Jonathan Shenkin died 'in an act of bravery' whilst working as a paramedic. Another British aid worker, Paul Urey, died in detention with signs of 'possible unspeakable torture' after being captured by pro-Russian separatist forces.

=== United States ===
The United States Department of State issued a travel advisory formally advising all Americans not to travel to Ukraine. 18 U.S. Code § 960, the modern and binding form of the Neutrality Act of 1794, prohibits United States citizens from taking up arms against any country at peace with the United States. It is unclear whether the United States Congress will pass legislation to waive this restriction with respect to the conflict in Ukraine. However, several Americans have spoken publicly and in the media about their service in Ukraine, without any legal charges filed against them.

On 3 March 2022, the Ukrainian embassy in Washington, DC announced that 3,000 U.S. citizens had signed up to volunteer. By 10 March 2022, the embassy had announced that 6,000 United States citizens had attempted to sign up for the International Legion. However, as of 10 March, only 100 were approved to join.

The first photo distributed by Ukraine of the International Legion reportedly showed American volunteers. Two former US Marines, Alex Drueke and Andy Tai Ngoc Huynh, were captured in June 2022 by Russian forces in fighting near Kharkiv and released that September in a prisoner exchange. In January 2025, CNN reported that at least twenty American volunteers were missing in action.

=== Uruguay ===
On 1 February 2023, an Uruguayan volunteer codenamed Teddy was reported to be fighting in Ukraine since 24 February 2022. In 2023, it was reported that a 47-year-old man named Pablo, who worked as a taxi driver in Montevideo, had enlisted. In December 2025, Natalia Tejeira, a 41-year-old woman from Artigas with training in nursing and prior work experience as a security guard, became the first Uruguayan woman to join the fighting in Ukraine.

=== Venezuela ===
José David Chaparro, a Venezuelan from San Cristóbal who settled in Kyiv in the early 1990s and served as Venezuela's chargé d'affaires in Moscow between 2001 and 2005, enlisted in the Territorial Defense Forces in the second day of the invasion along with his wife and became the commander of a division of Ukrainian volunteers. Chaparro's unit has helped donating food, water, commodities and fuel to civilians affected by Russian bombings.

=== Vietnam ===
Under Article 425 of the Vietnamese Criminal Code, it states that anyone who fights as a mercenary to fight against another country will be imprisoned from 5 to 15 years. Despite this, an unknown number of Vietnamese military veterans have expressed their desire to help the Ukrainians.

== Notable individuals who enlisted ==
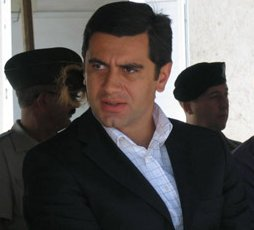
Irakli Okruashvili, a Georgian politician who enlisted

- Finbar Cafferkey, an Irish political activist and veteran of the Kurdish People's Defense Units war against the Islamic State. Was killed near Bakhmut on 19 April 2023.
- José David Chaparro, ex-Chargé d'Affaires of Venezuela in Moscow from 2001 to 2005
- Aleko Elisashvili, a member of the Parliament of Georgia
- Juris Jurašs, a member of the Latvian Saeima
- Ken Rhee, South Korean YouTuber and former South Korean Navy SWF officer
- Conor R. Kennedy, grandson of former United States Attorney General Robert F. Kennedy and great-nephew of former president of the United States John F. Kennedy
- Malcolm Nance, American author, retired U.S. Navy senior chief petty officer, founder of think tank Terror Asymmetrics Project on Strategy, Tactics and Radical Ideologies
- Irakli Okruashvili, a Georgian politician and former defense minister
- Vinness A. Ollervides (Irgen Gioro.Chi Wei), a Chinese dissident and whistleblower
- Kourosh Sehati, Iranian journalist
- Tseng Sheng-guang, a Taiwanese indigenous veteran who served as a corporal in the Republic of China Army and joined the International Legion in June 2022, he was often reported as the first soldier from the East Asia to be killed in action during the Russo-Ukrainian War.

== Casualties ==
Some casualties have been officially reported. However, it is not possible to determine the exact number of casualties due to the fog of war. In the most notable episode, on 13 March 2022, Russian missiles struck Yavoriv military base near the Polish border, killing 35 people and injuring 134 people, according to Ukrainian officials. As many as 1,000 foreign fighters had been training at the base as part of the Ukrainian Foreign Legion.

According to an interview with a former German volunteer, around 800 to 1,000 people were at the base at the time of the Russian attack, of whom at least 100 were at the building which was hit, and "none of whom came out".

On 8 February 2024, Task & Purpose reported that 50 Americans had been confirmed to have been killed while fighting for Ukraine with 40 of them being US military veterans.

In May 2024, Business Insider reported that "the legion is depleted by years of harsh reality and casualty rates extreme even for Ukraine".

== Controversies ==
Ukrainian Foreign Minister Dmytro Kuleba said that by 6 March 2022 more than 20,000 volunteers from 52 countries had enlisted to fight for Ukraine; several thousand more reportedly joined after the announcement. Kuleba withheld further demographic details, citing that several nations forbid their citizens from fighting for foreign governments. However, a New York Times investigation in March 2023 found that there may be only 1,500 members in the organization, including many who have engaged in fraud and stolen valor. Marco Bocchese, an assistant professor of international relations at Webster Vienna Private University, called the claim of 20,000 volunteers "pure propaganda".

=== Leadership and criminality ===
According to The Kyiv Independent, which has received information from sources inside the Legion, the leadership of the intelligence-run wing of the International Legion or GUR is allegedly implicated in various violations, including abuse, theft, and sending soldiers unprepared on reckless missions. The paper also claims that one of the unit's commanders is an alleged former member of a criminal organization from Poland, wanted at home for fraud: the Legion's fighters accuse him of abusing power by ordering soldiers to loot shops, threatening soldiers with a gun, and sexually harassing the legion's female medics.

Members of the Legion, according to The Kyiv Independent, repeatedly reported this to the Ministry of Internal Affairs, the Ministry of Defence, the Verkhovna Rada (Ukraine's national parliament) and the Office of the President of Ukraine, but received no proper answer.

=== Criminals who joined the legion ===
- Craig Lang, a US Army veteran and double-murder suspect. He was later extradited back to the United States.
- Steven Keith Munroe, an American who joined the legion after he was refused entry into the US Army due to his criminal record. He was later killed in action during the 2022 Kharkiv counteroffensive.
- Tristan Nettles, a 34 year old US Marine Corps veteran who used his girlfriend to unwittingly transport drugs in Thailand.
- Maxwell Gomes Ribeiro, a Brazilian who was dishonorably discharged from the São Paulo Military Police after murdering his brother. Joined the International Legion after he was released in 2022 and was later killed in 2024 during the Battle of Avdiivka.

According to the investigative outlet Intelligence Online in July 2025, Mexico's National Intelligence Centre had warned Ukraine about people linked to drug cartels volunteering to join the International Legion in order to gain expertise in the usage of FPV drones rather than aid in defending Ukraine against Russia. Ukrainian security and intelligence units as well as several European authorities launched investigations in response, uncovering that some Latin American private military companies were offering volunteers involved in criminal activity. According to the IO, returning Mexican volunteers have used the knowledge they obtained in Ukraine against rival cartels and domestic security forces. The Ukrainian SBU has been tasked with preventing this kind of export of military knowledge to criminals.

=== Extremism ===
There have been several reported cases of extremists, fugitives, and criminals from other countries joining the Ukrainian military. In February 2025, Patrick Messmer, a Swiss volunteer in the Legion, told Swiss media that of the members of the International Legion, 40% "come for the money", 10 to 20% are idealists, and 30% have a criminal background. A notable case is Craig Lang, an American military veteran and double-murder suspect who served in far-right militias and the legion. In 2022, an image emerged of two Croatian volunteers holding the flag of the Independent State of Croatia. The Belarusian Volunteer Corps double cross insignia was noted for being similar to the 30th Waffen Grenadier Division of the SS's insignia. In December 2023, the Ministry of Internal Affairs of Belarus designated the unit as an extremist group. The Karelian National Battalion's first insignia which the unit adopted on 19 January 2023, was a Viking ship with a Wolfsangel on the ship's sail. It was later changed to an arm holding a sword with the word "Karelia" above in Karelian. The German Volunteer Corps which was formed in February 2023 was noted by Junge Welt to have connections and similar ideological perspectives to the Neo-Nazi Third Way party. The Russian Volunteer Corps (RVC) was founded in August 2022 The founder and leader of the group is Denis Nikitin, who has been described as a neo-Nazi. The Ukrainian government claims that the RVC is not a part of the Ukrainian armed forces. However, the unit is attached to Military Unit A3449 which is a collection of units of the International Legion that are subordinate to the Main Directorate of Intelligence (HUR).

=== Recruitment and desertion ===
Tensions between several countries and the Ukrainian government have been reported because of Ukraine's recruitment of foreign volunteers, due to breaking local laws and several cases of military personnel deserting their units to travel to Ukraine. Citizens of countries with local laws banning service in foreign militaries may face criminal charges upon return to their home country. Countries with military personnel that have deserted and traveled to Ukraine include: Belgium, Britain, France (including legionnaires from Ukraine), and South Korea. The French Foreign Legion has released individual Ukrainian legionnaires from their contract with the beginning of the 2022 Russian invasion.

The legion has experienced desertion. Contracts for foreign volunteers reportedly have indefinite time frames, meaning that volunteers who leave before the end of the war are deserting. It has been reported that the Ukrainian government offers minimal resistance to foreign volunteers who decide to leave.

A legion member from the Faroe Islands named Bjørn told Euronews that of the recruits that end up at the front, 20% leave after 2–5 missions because they realize that "war is hell".

=== Defection ===
It was reported in March 2023 that an American ex-Legion volunteer named John McIntyre defected to Russia after he was discharged from the legion for bad behavior. He was later used by Russian propaganda "to push pro-Kremlin points that it is the United States who pushed Russia into war in Ukraine".

== See also ==
- Foreign fighters in the Russo-Ukrainian War
- International Brigades
- Simón Bolívar Internationalist Brigades
- International Freedom Battalion
- Ukrainian volunteer battalions
