= Ken Rhee =

South Korean soldier (born 1984)

- 이근
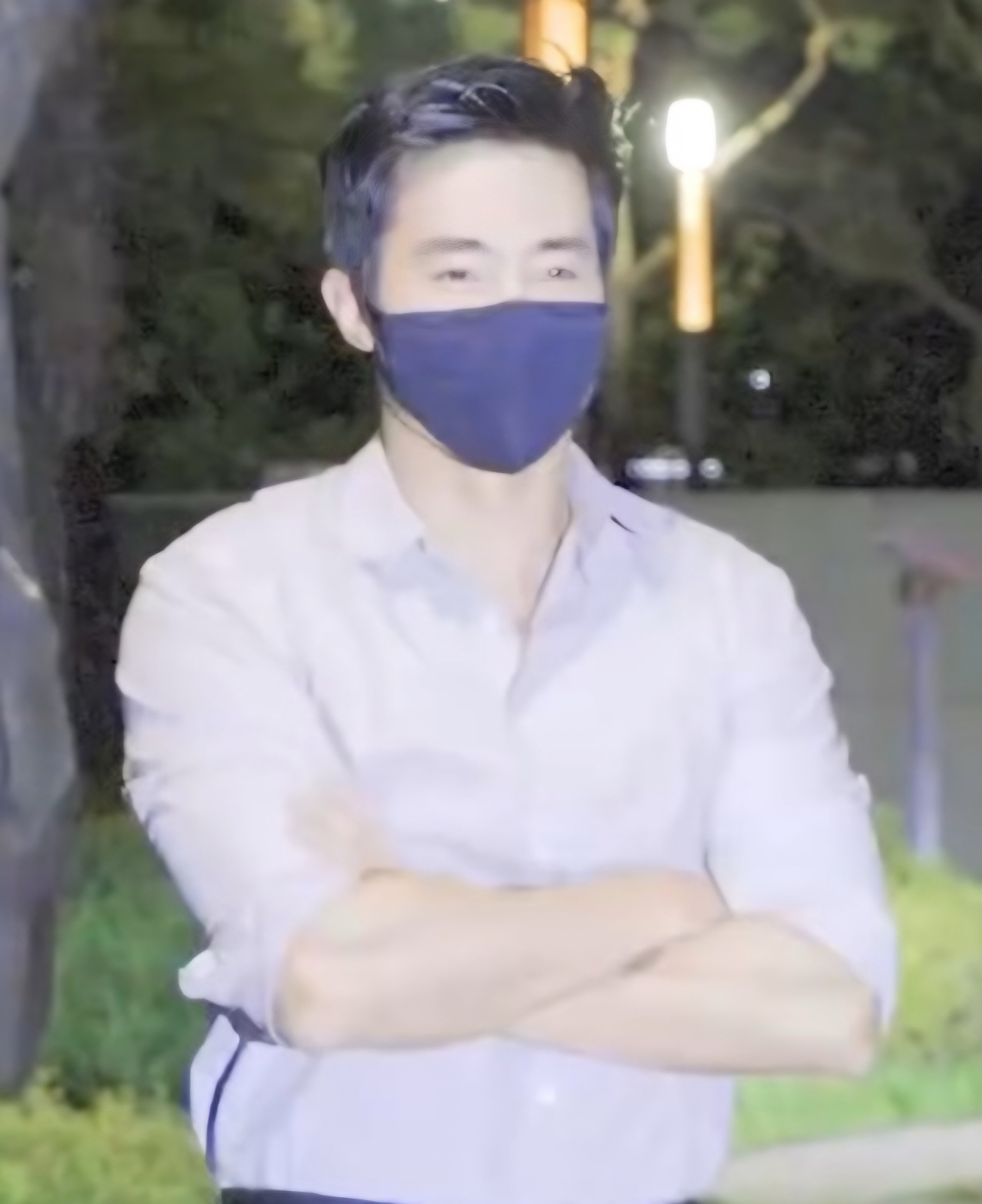
- Born: March 22, 1984 (age 42)
- Education: Bachelor of Arts in Modern Languages and Literature, Virginia Military Institute
- Occupation: Republic of Korea Navy
- Years active: 2007–2014
- Website: rokseal.net

Ken Rhee (born March 22, 1984), Korean name Lee Geun (Korean: 이근) is a South Korean former soldier, businessman, and broadcaster, best known for participating in the Russia-Ukraine War as a volunteer member of the Ukrainian Foreign Legion, and the resulting controversy in South Korea, where upon his return he was accused of violating the law.

== Life ==
Born in South Korea in 1984, he immigrated to the U.S. at the age of 3, and grew up in New York City and LA. He dreamed of becoming a Navy SEAL officer in the U.S. military, but he did not enter the Naval Academy because he did not have citizenship, and after going to Virginia Military Institute, he decided to become a Navy officer in the Republic of Korea.

After graduating from Virginia Military Institute, he gave up his permanent residency and returned to Korea in 2007, commissioned as the 102nd officer of the Naval Academy Candidate(OCS), and served in DDH-976 and the Navy's Special Warfare Corps(UDT/SAL). During his active career, he completed various special forces training courses of the Korean and U.S. military with excellent performance, and he was a soldier with various practical experience by dispatching a number of overseas troops and participating in military operations.

After being discharged from the military as a lieutenant in 2014, he served in the PMC, served as an anti-terrorism and tactical shooting instructor in a number of military and police agencies, and worked in security and security-related positions at the US State Department and the UN.

He served as executive director of MUSAT, a security and tactical consulting company, and became popular in 2020 by appearing in the YouTube web content "가짜사나이". Since then, he has left MUSAT and established ROKSEAL, a military security consulting company, and has been actively operating the YouTube channel "ROKSEAL" of the same name.

In March 2022, he participated in the Russia-Ukraine War as a member of the International Legion of Territorial Defense of Ukraine (ILDU), a Ukrainian volunteer army, and returned to Korea in May 2022 after being injured while performing a combat mission.

== Career ==
1. 2007–2014 (during active career)
| year | career |
|---|---|
| 2007 | Commissioned as officer of the 102nd Naval Cadet Corps (OCS) |
| 2007 | Completion of the Naval Education Command Combat Academy Sailing Elementary Military Class |
| 2007–2008 | Combat Information Assistant (DDH-976) |
| 2008 | Naval Special Warfare (UDT/SEAL) Special Warfare Training Course 54–1st Seat Completion |
| 2008 | Completed the Marine Corps Education and Training Corps basic airlift course |
| 2008 | Naval Special Warfare Group (UDT/SEAL) 1st Special Forces Battalion Air Operations Team (AIROPS) Commander |
| 2008 | Completion of Naval Special Warfare Group (UDT/SEAL) Maritime Counter-Terrorism Course (MCT) |
| 2009–2010 | Naval Special Warfare Group (UDT/SEAL) Special Mission Battalion (SMB) Company Commander |
| 2009–2010 | Cheonghae Unit 1st and 2nd Checkpoint Operations Team |
| 2009–2010 | Dispatch of combat troops to the waters off Somalia |
| 2010 | Completion of the Navy Special Warfare Team (UDT/SEAL) Special Operations Team Transfer Course (SDV). |
| 2010–2011 | Naval Special Warfare Group (UDT/SEAL) 1st Special Forces Battalion Undersea Operations Team (SDV) Company Commander |
| 2011 | Completed ROK-US Joint Special Operations Exchange Training (JCET) US NAVY SEALS sniper course |
| 2011 | Completed the Special Operations Final Attack Controller Course (SOTAC) at the Army Special Operations Command's Special Warfare School |
| 2012 | Completed the 294th US NAVY SEALS Beginner's Course (BUD/S) |
| 2012 | Completed the U.S. NAVY SEALS Officer Course (JOTC) |
| 2013 | Completed the 295th class of the U.S. NAVY SEALS Specialized Training Course (SQT) |
| 2013 | Completed the U.S. TACTICAL AIR OPERATIONS NAVY high-altitude descent course (HALO/HAHO) |
| 2013 | Completed U.S. SKYDIVE ELSINORE wingsuit descent course |
| 2013–2014 | Naval Special Warfare Group (UDT/SEAL) education and training battalion specialist training leader |
| 2014 | Navy Special Warfare Team (UDT/SEAL) Lieutenant Discharged |

2. 2014–present (after discharge)
| year | career |
|---|---|
| 2014–2018 | TRIDENT TACTICS CEO |
| 2014 | Seoul Police Special Forces (SWAT KNP868) counter-terrorism and tactical shooting instructor |
| 2015 | Obtained certification as an instructor for the United States Skydiving Association (USPA) / Korea Skydiving Association (KPA) Accelerated Freefall Course (AFF) |
| 2015 | Obtained certification as an instructor for the United States Skydiving Association (USPA) / Korea Skydiving Association (KPA) two-person descent course (TANDEM) |
| 2015–2016 | Seoul Skydiving School Instructor |
| 2015–2016 | TRICELL INTERNATIONAL Overseas Business Director |
| 2015 | URBAN SHIELD National Team (Joint Police Special Forces) Counter-Terrorism and Tactical Shooting Instructor |
| 2015 | Brazilian police special forces BOPE anti-terrorism and security instructor |
| 2016 | Air Force intelligence unit high-altitude descent instructor |
| 2016– | Naval intelligence unit high-altitude descent instructor |
| 2016–2017 | G4S military security company (PMC) team leader |
| 2016–2017 | PMC Iraq Combat Deployment |
| 2017 | Taiwanese police special forces, Haesoon Special Forces (CGA-STF) counter-terrorism and tactical shooting instructor |
| 2017–2018 | SECURITY INVESTIGATOR, U.S. Department of State |
| 2018 | Marine Corps Special Reconnaissance Team (ROKMC RECON) counter-terrorism instructor |
| 2018 | Presidential Security Service (PSS) tactical shooting instructor |
| 2018–2020 | SECURITY OFFICER, UN Office of the High Commissioner for Human Rights (OHCHR) |
| 2018–2020 | MUSAT Executive Director |
| 2019– | SKY TACTICAL high altitude descent course (HALO/HAHO) director |
| 2020– | ROKSEAL CEO |
| 2022– | INTERNATIONAL LEGION OF DEFENSE OF UKRAINE |
| 2022 | Participation in the Russian-Ukrainian War Volunteer Force |

== Awards ==
| Award Ceremony | Year |
|---|---|
| Commendation from the Commander of Naval Operations Command | 2008 |
| Commendation from the Chairman of the Joint Chiefs of Staff | 2009 |
| Navy Chief of Staff Commendation | 2010 |
| Presidential Security Service Security Safety Training Center instructor appreciation certificate | 2018 |

== Published ==
| Book Title | Publication date | ISBN |
|---|---|---|
| 《ULTIMATUM: 죽어도 포기하지 않는 최강 멘탈의 기술》 | July 21, 2021 | 9791130640150 |
| 《Ken Rhee's Never Die Diary》 | December 24, 2020 | 9791191043112 |

== Controversy ==
=== Controversy over Russia-Ukraine War ===
==== After entering Ukraine ====
Ukraine is a travel ban country that has been issued with a level 4 warning under the travel warning system since February 13, 2022 due to the war, so entering Ukraine without government permission can be punished according to the passport law. According to the Ukrainian Embassy in Korea, dozens of Koreans also expressed their intention to support volunteer troops at the embassy, and warned them not to enter Ukraine without permission. Ken Rhee said he would be punished for this.

The Ministry of Foreign Affairs confirmed that Ken Rhee, who entered the country without permission from March 6, participated in Ukraine, and said on March 17 that it was true that nine Korean nationals, including Ken Rhee, entered the country without permission, and that the remaining eight people would have participated in the war as volunteer soldiers, and explained that they were trying to confirm their whereabouts. Ken Rhee's Instagram account of him leaving for Ukraine to participate in the volunteer army was evidence, and he was accused by the Ministry of Foreign Affairs of violating the passport law.

==== After returning to Korea ====
Ken Rhee left Warsaw Chopin Airport (Polish: Lotnisko Chopina w Warszawie) and returned home at 07:30 on May 27, 2022, through Incheon International Airport. Ken Rhee, who participated in the war as a foreigner for about 80 days, was accused of violating the passport law, was investigated by the police on June 10 after being quarantined to find out more about the charges, and most of the charges he committed were admitted. The international criminal investigation unit of the Seoul Metropolitan Police Agency's Narcotics Crime Investigation Unit sent Ken Rhee to the Seoul Central District Prosecutors' Office without detention on June 14. The police admitted to violating the passport law and did not investigate the "pre-crime" or "crime of using explosives," which are applied when personally participating in other countries' combat actions, although they are likely to violate the passport law.

Ken Rhee said that both knee cruciate ligaments were torn and he wanted to return to Ukraine after treatment. Ken Rhee said that while preparing to be punished for violating the law, he bravely fought on the battlefield by protecting people in the war as a volunteer army. During the war, not all volunteers receive citizenship, but the number of people who can receive citizenship is limited, and one of them is Ken Rhee himself. Nevertheless, Ken Rhee himself, who rejected his citizenship, is a Korean, so he said he would be punished according to the Korean court's ruling. Ken Rhee said he reported and recorded war crimes, including the slaughter of civilians by Russian troops in Irpin while participating in the war in Kyiv and the South, and said that it would be a criminal act if he did not help Ukraine under such circumstances. Regarding his participation in the war in Ukraine, he said that it was his duty and "the fight between good and evil" to help Ukraine with a war against Russia, a powerful country that is different in character from other countries, which is a weak country. He said that the violation of the passport law was a traffic law, and that he made the right decision based on his belief, even though he knew he could be punished for illegal activities, and that he had no regrets at all.

Rhee was given a year and six months in prison suspended for three years for violating the Passport Act.

==== Hit-and-Run and Assault ====
In July 2022, Ken Rhee was sentenced for a hit-and-run that caused an injury to a motorcyclist. He was ordered to go through 40 hours of driving classes and 80 hours of social services. It was revealed that the injury suffered by the victim was "not light" and that he failed to settle with the victim.

In March 2022, Rhee was indicted for hitting a man outside of a court for which he was indicted in assault charges in June.

In 2017, Rhee was convicted for sexual assault after grabbing a woman's bottom. He was fined 2 million won. When this revelation was made in 2020, Rhee claimed that he did not commit any sexual crimes and appealed due to it being wrongfully convicted. The court rejected the appeal due to the gravity of the crime and the victim not forgiving Rhee. The victim additionally kept the incident a secret and told no one about the case hoping that Rhee would "live in remorse". The victim's lawyer in response to Rhee's denial of committing any sexual crime stated, "I am greatly shocked that the offender distorted the facts and the legal decision and released a statement claiming false facts". Due to the controversy, advertisements featuring Rhee were taken down including Lotteria where Rhee was the main spokesmodel for its "military-style" hamburger and PearlAbyss for its Black Desert M mobile game. KB Savings Bank also removed all advertisements involving Rhee due to a debt scandal.

== See also ==
- United States Navy SEALs
- Republic of Korea Navy Special Warfare Flotilla
- Koreans in Ukraine
