= 4th Battalion International Legion =

International Legion unit

4th Training Battalion International Legion
- 4-й навчальний батальйон Інтернаціонального легіону
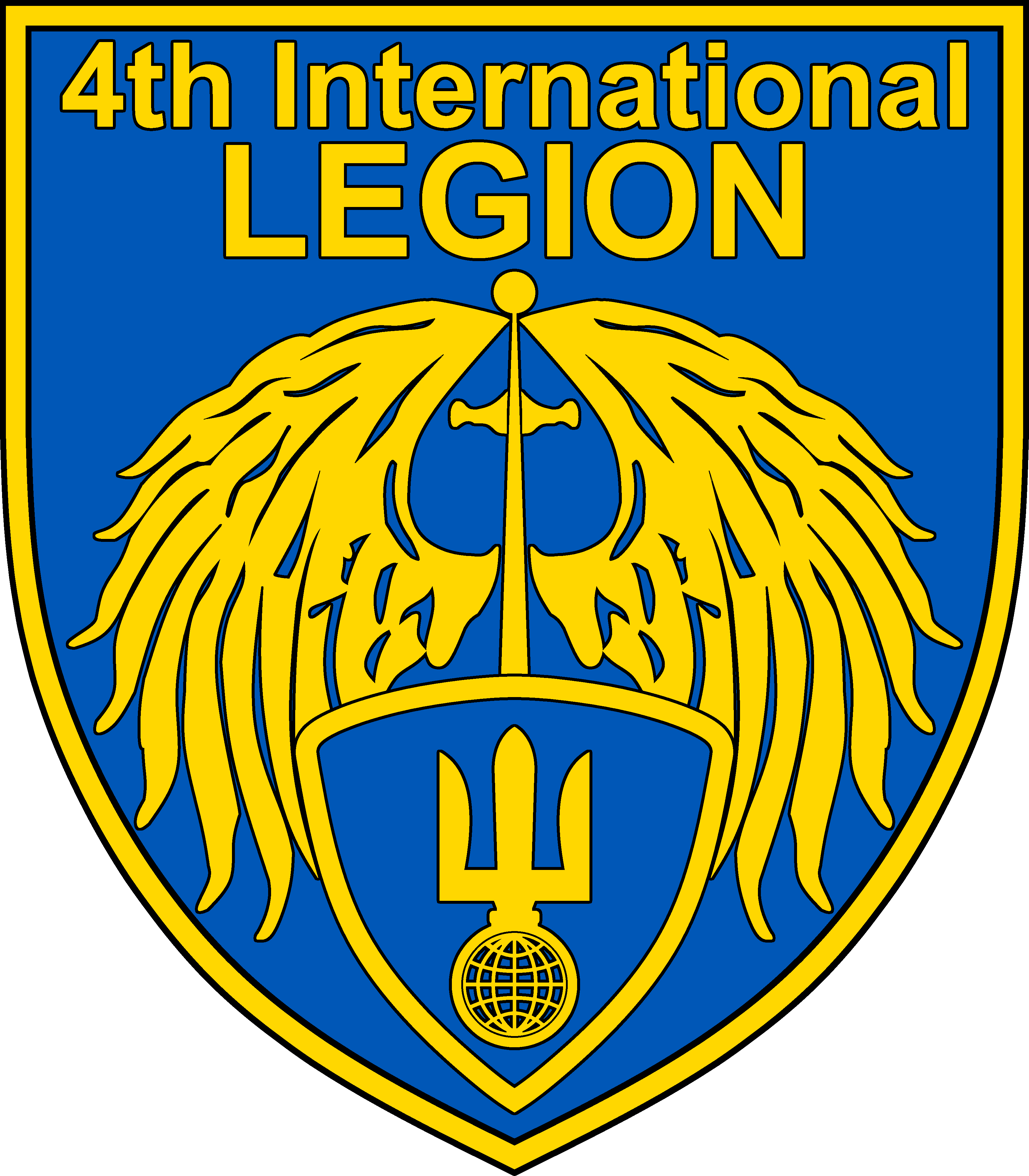
- Shoulder sleeve insignia
- Active: 2023 – present
- Country: Ukraine
- Branch: Armed Forces of Ukraine
- Type: Foreign volunteer battalion
- Role: Light infantry
- Size: 500 (Estimated October 2022)
- Part of: International Legion Defence of Ukraine
- Engagements: Russo-Ukrainian war; Russian invasion of Ukraine

Commanders
- Current commander: Unknown

Insignia
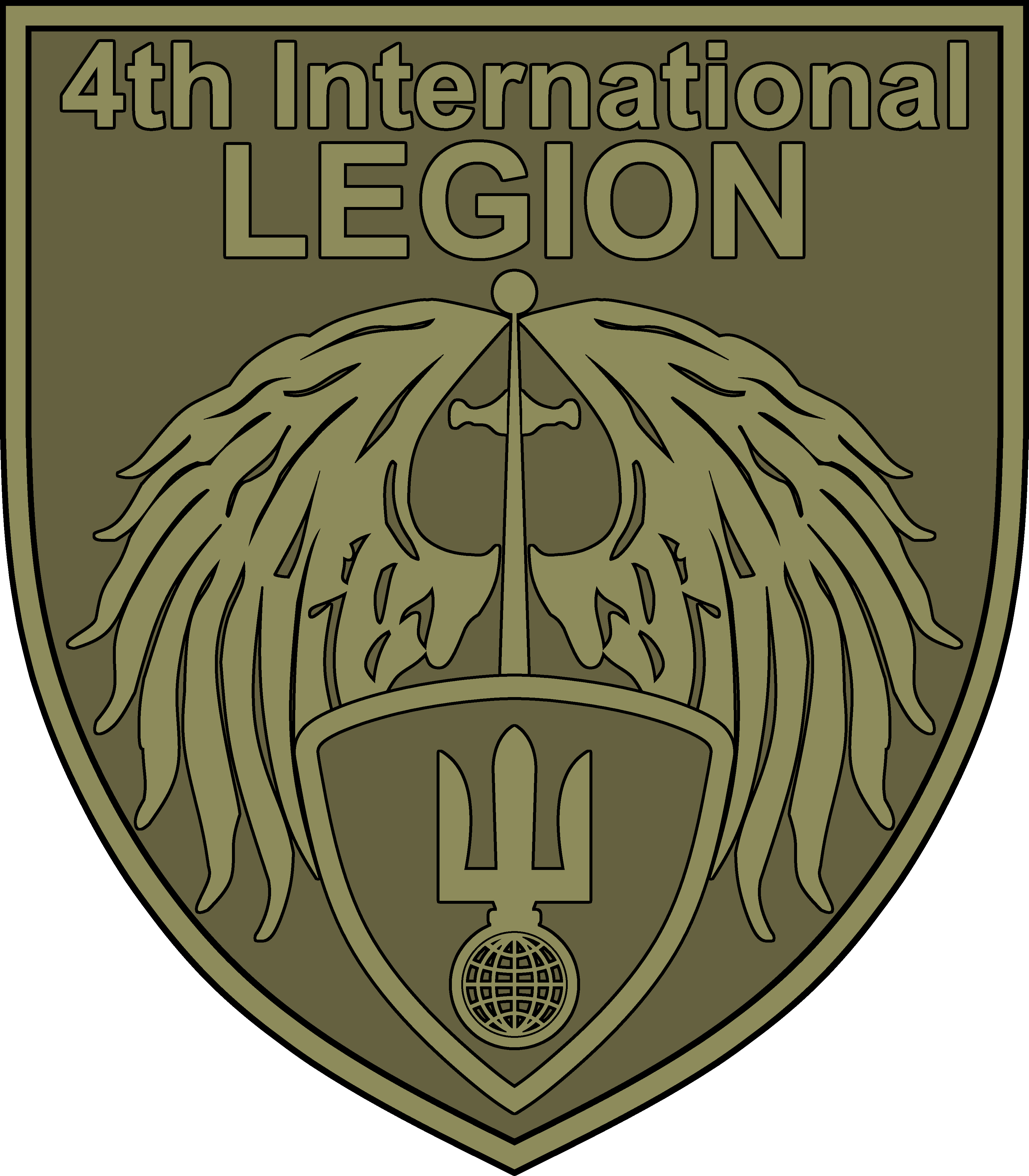
- Field insignia

The 4th Training Battalion of the International Legion (Ukrainian: 4 навчальний батальйон Інтернаціонального легіону, romanized: 4 navchalnii batalion Internacionalnogo legionu), also commonly referred to as the 4th Battalion of the International Legion or the 4th International Legion, is a formation of the Ukrainian Armed Forces, functioning as part of the International Legion Defence of Ukraine formed somewhere in early 2023.

The purpose of the battalion is to select and train instructors and troops for the International Legion.

== History ==
=== Formation ===
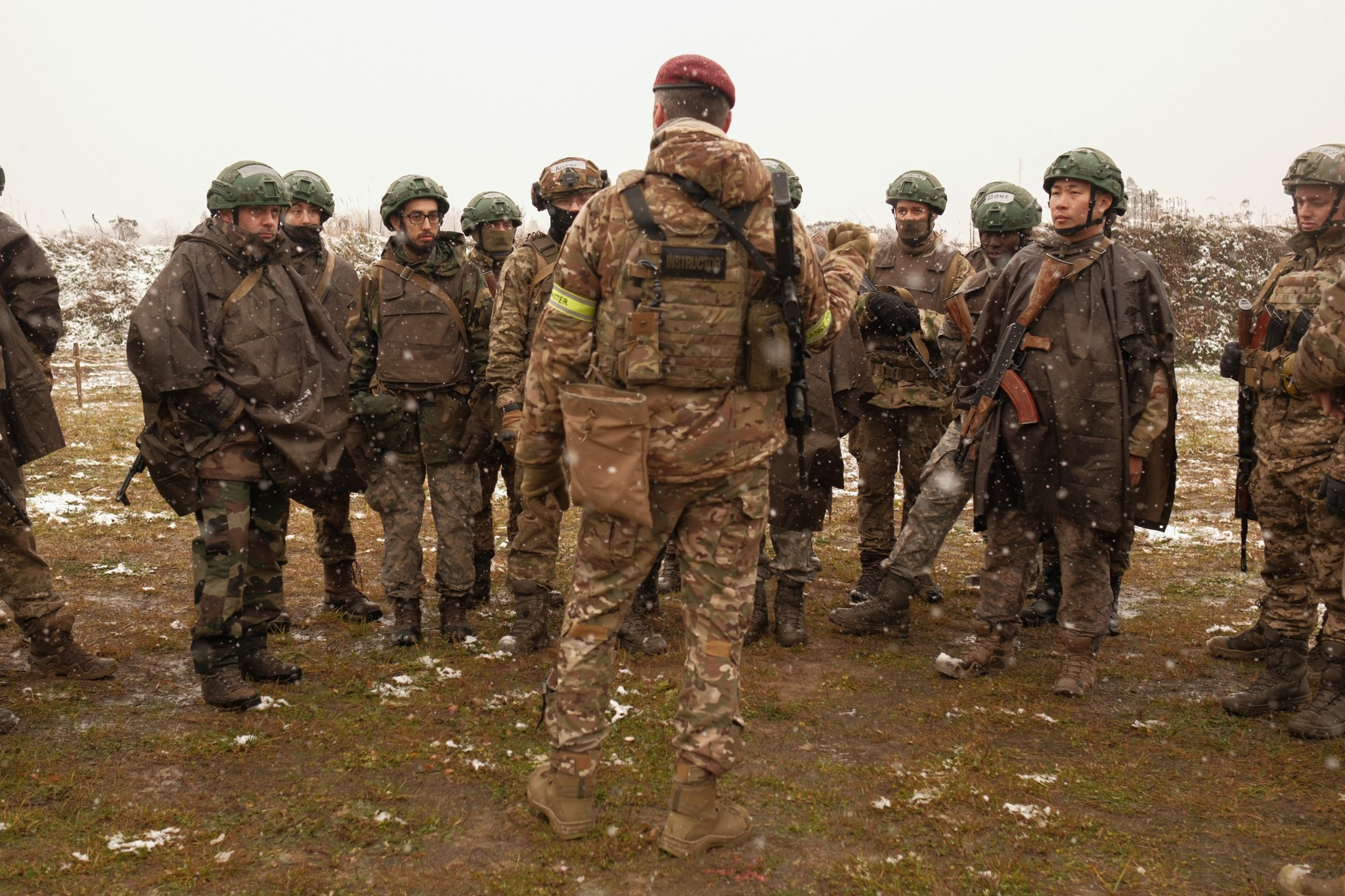
Legionnaires during training, November 2023.

On 27 February 2022, Ukrainian President Volodymyr Zelenskyy made an announcement declaring the establishment of an international fighting force to assist in defending the sovereignty and independence of Ukraine amidst the Russian invasion. Alongside the creation of an International Legion, included the creation of battalions making up the structure of the unit, the first being the 1st Infantry Battalion which was created on the same day alongside the 3rd Special Purpose Battalion. Later on, the 2nd Battalion would be established in October 2022.

The 4th Training Battalion is the most recent battalion established within the International Legions structure. According to various news articles and social media posts, its creation occurred somewhere between March and July 2023.

According to Intelligence Online, a veteran from the United States known as Matthew Parker, a retired Cavalry Scout, helped push for the creation of a new battalion within the International Legion – being 4th Battalion. It was confirmed that Parker served from 1990 to 2011 as a cavalry scout in the United States Army. It was acknowledged that the battalion would specialise in the selection and training of instructors and soldiers for the International Legion, where they would then be assigned to one of the three main battalions within the Legion.

=== Training ===
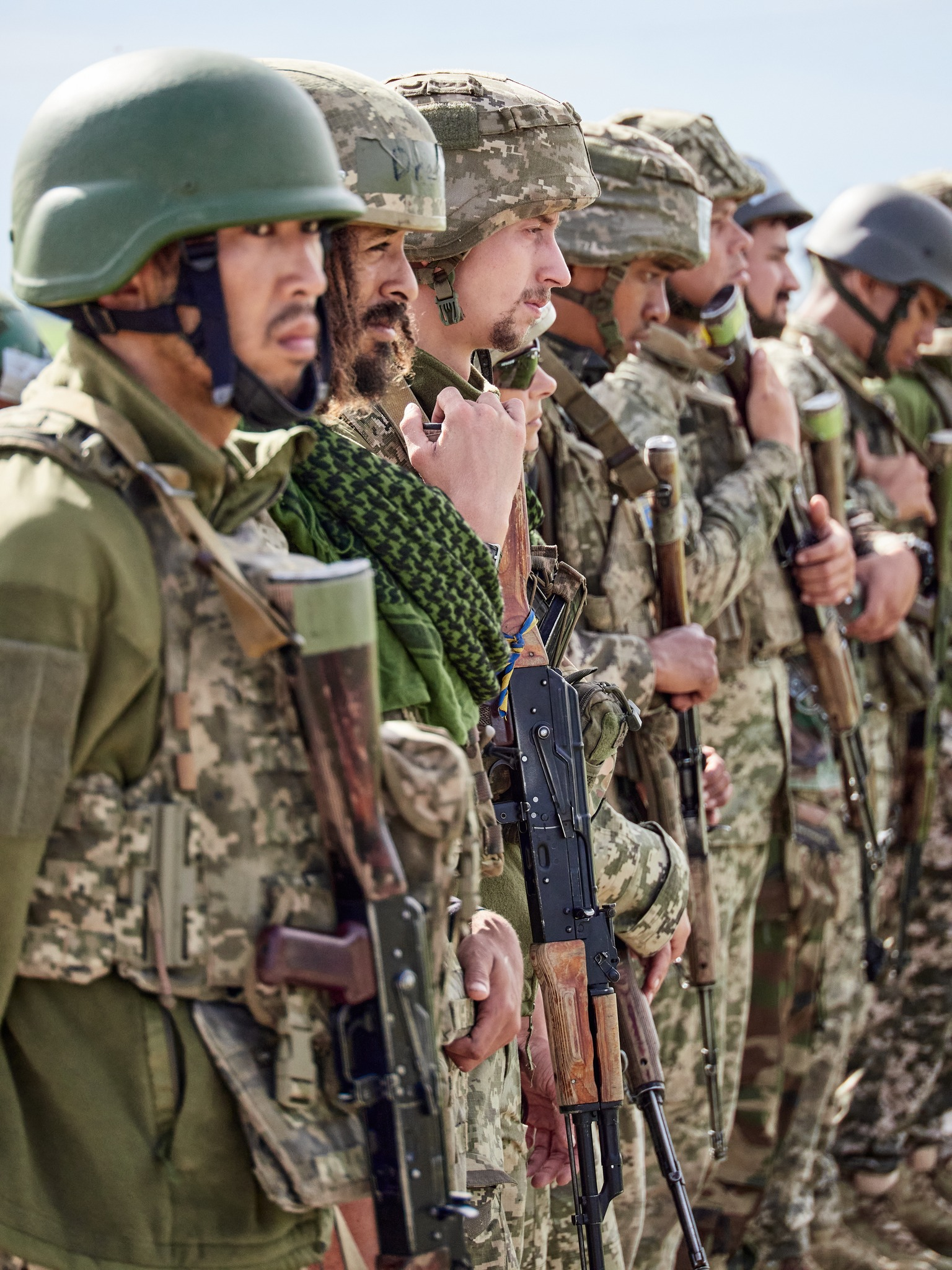
Legionnaires undergoing training, July 2024.

Publications by the International Legion itself indicate that the battalion specialise in small arms training, as well as explosive ordnance disposal. Instructors in the battalion were said to have been invited from Britain and trained troops in understanding the importance of explosive ordnance disposal training, and taught 'essential' techniques which included mine detection, staying vigilant against booby traps, and more.

In July 2023, the International Legion announced a new training programme for legionnaires who joined. This training was said to be under the guidance of experienced instructors who would train them in handling weapons, small unit tactics, combat first aid, explosive ordnance techniques, and close quarters combat. It was also stated that legionnaires would receive other essential skills they would require on the frontline. Upon successful completion of the training programme, it was acknowledged that soldiers would be deployed to combat units of the International Legion, or the legionnaire teams in other units in the Ukrainian Armed Forces.

=== Insignia ===
The insignia of the battalion aligns with the design elements of other battalions within the Legion. It features a blue and yellow colour scheme, reflecting the colours of the Ukrainian flag. At the top of the shield, the inscription "4th International Legion" is displayed in yellow. In the centre of the insignia are yellow wings with a sword between either side of the wings. Below the sword and wings is a shield with a yellow border, containing the Ukrainian tryzub variant used by the International Legion, with a globe beneath it.

== Equipment ==
=== Small arms ===
Soldiers in the battalion, undergoing training, have been seen to use a limited number of small arms – typically being from the Kalashnikov rifle series such as the AKM.

As of July 2024, the brigade uses the following small arms:

- AKM – Soviet/Russian assault rifle

== Russo-Ukrainian war ==
=== Russian invasion of Ukraine ===
The battalion is intended to make combat-ready soldiers who join the legion who are then sent off to fight in other units of the International Legion. The other three battalions of the Legion, being the 1st Infantry Battalion, 2nd Battalion, and the 3rd Special Purpose Battalion, have participated in major military campaigns during the Russian invasion of Ukraine. These include the Kharkiv counteroffensive in 2022, where the 1st Infantry Battalion liberated the town of Kupiansk. The battalions have also been involved Battle of Bakhmut, and the defence of the Serebryansky forest along the Svatove-Kreminna line, notably by the 2nd Battalion.

== Structure ==
As of July 2024 the battalion's structure is as follows:

- 4th Training Battalion International Legion
  - Battalion's Headquarters
