= Bolívar Battalion =

Pro-Ukraine volunteer force unit

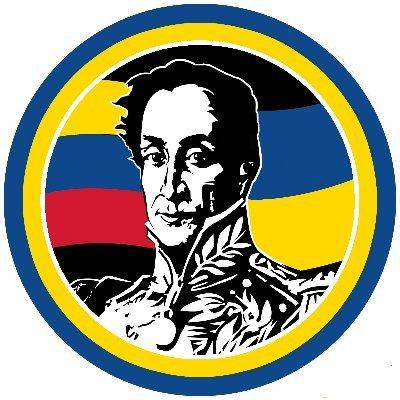
- Unit emblem of the Bolívar Battalion
- Active: 22 August 2023 - Present
- Allegiance: Ukraine
- Branch: International Legion
- Type: Foreign volunteer Battalion
- Role: Urban Warfare; Mine Clearance; Patrolling; Reconnaissance
- Garrison/HQ: Kyiv, Ukraine
- Patron: Simon Bolivar
- Engagements: Russo-Ukrainian war (2022–present)

Commanders
- Current commander: José David Chaparro

The Bolívar Battalion is a unit of the International Legion fighting on the side of Ukraine in the Russo-Ukrainian war.

== History ==
The Bolívar Battalion was established on August 22, 2023. It is mainly made up of volunteer soldiers from South American countries such as Colombia, Venezuela, Ecuador and Argentina. However, there are also Ukrainians, Australians and Americans fighting in the unit. The battalion is led by a Venezuelan named José David Chaparro Martínez. José arrived in Ukraine for the first time in 1989 when it was still a part of the Soviet Union.

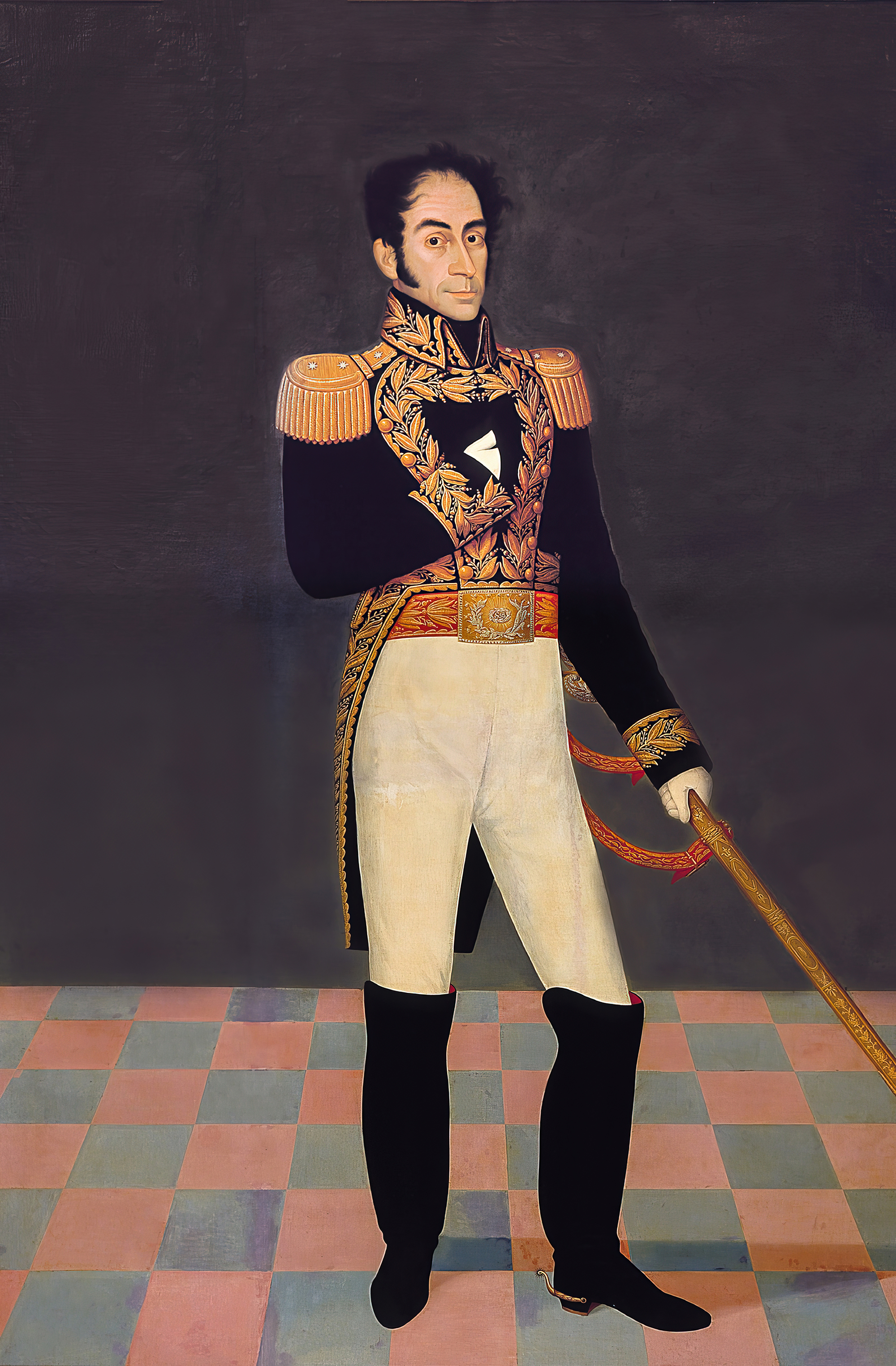
The name of the Battalion bears the Name of the Liberator Simón Bolívar

The former USSR granted him a scholarship to study for a postgraduate degree in law, but when he arrived in Moscow he discovered that students from countries "not aligned with communism" were sent to Kiev (modern day Kyiv). In 2000 he returned to Moscow as Chargé d'Affaires of the Venezuelan Diplomatic Corps, and this time he had to be allowed to live in the Russian capital despite his openly democratic and liberal ideas.

After his time living in Moscow, he stated that the Russian Federation was a "steamroller where the state intervened in every aspect of its citizens' lives."

José claimed that Venezuela had become a social laboratory of Cuba, Iran and Russia. In which Russia has placed its Wagner mercenaries to "guard" Venezuela's gold mines and oil. He also warns that the Nicolás Maduro government's direct relationship with the war in Ukraine is going unnoticed.

Venezuela has been a supplier to Russia and has grown closer to Russia over the course of the War in Ukraine. Venezuela has been described as Russia's most important trading and military ally in Latin America.

The battalion is named after Simón Bolívar, a Venezuelan military and political leader who led what are currently the countries of Colombia, Venezuela, Ecuador, Peru, Panama, and Bolivia to independence from the Spanish Empire.
