= Morning Telegraph =

Morning Telegraph may refer to:

- Sheffield Telegraph, known as Morning Telegraph from 11 January 1966 to 8 February 1986
- The Morning Telegraph, a New York City newspaper devoted mostly to theatrical and horse racing news; published from 1833 to 1972

== See also ==
- Telegraph (disambiguation)
- The Telegraph (disambiguation)
- Evening Telegraph
