= Peng Chenliang =

China-born Ukrainian Foreign Legion soldier (1994–2024)

- 彭陈亮
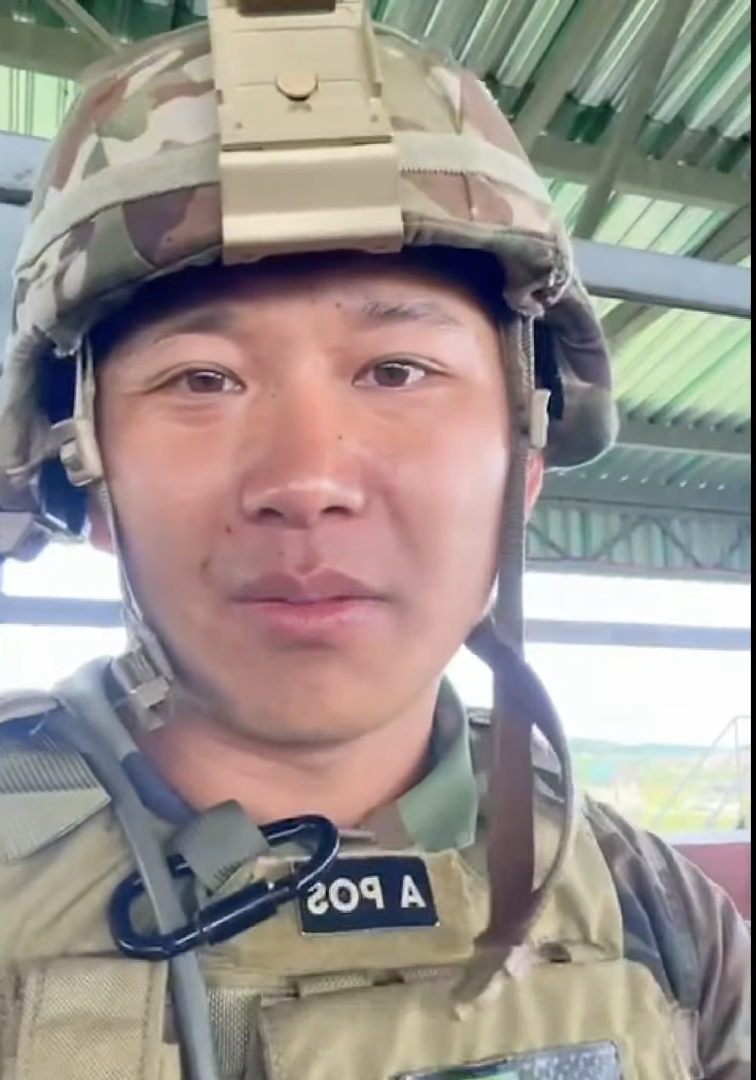
- Born: 2 November 1994; Kaiyuan, Honghe, Yunnan, China
- Died: 4 November 2024 (aged 30); Eastern Ukraine
- Other name: Farias
- Military career
- Allegiance: Ukraine
- Branch: International Legion of Territorial Defense of Ukraine
- Service years: 2024
- Units: Armed Forces of Ukraine; Territorial Defense Forces; International Legion; 1st Battalion International Legion
- Conflicts: Russo-Ukrainian War; Russian invasion of Ukraine; Eastern Ukraine campaign †

Farias Peng Chenliang (Chinese: 彭陈亮; pinyin: Péng Chénliàng; 2 November 1994 – 4 November 2024) was a Chinese volunteer soldier from Yunnan who served in Ukraine's International Legion since April 2024 to fight alongside Ukrainian forces against Russian military invasion.

== Personal life ==
Originally from Yunnan Province, China, Peng left the country after authorities detained him for seven months for posts on X that were deemed anti-Russian, anti-CCP and pro-Taiwan.

After arriving in Ukraine, he lived in Lviv and considered it his new home, where he met his Ukrainian girlfriend.

== Death ==
According to CNA, Peng was killed by shellfire during a combat operation on the eastern front, becoming the first Chinese national confirmed to have participated in the war on Ukraine's side.

=== Legacy ===
According to a Chinese volunteer in Ukraine who goes by the name Fan, he was influenced by Peng enlisting in the Ukrainian military to move there in an October 2025 interview.

In an interview with a Chinese volunteer named "Mustang" in November 2026, his death has inspired a lot of Chinese volunteers to enlist in Ukraine.
