= Evening Telegraph =

Evening Telegraph is a common newspaper name, and may refer to:

- Evening Telegraph (Dundee), Scotland
- Evening Telegraph (Dublin), Ireland, published 1871–1924.
- Coventry Evening Telegraph, England, now the Coventry Telegraph
- Derby Evening Telegraph, England, now the Derby Telegraph
- Grimsby Evening Telegraph, England, now the Grimsby Telegraph
- Northamptonshire Evening Telegraph, England
- Peterborough Evening Telegraph, Cambridgeshire, England
- Philadelphia Evening Telegraph, Pennsylvania, United States, published 1864–1918
- The Evening Telegraph (Charters Towers), Queensland, Australia, published 1901–1921

== See also ==
- Telegraph (disambiguation)
- The Telegraph (disambiguation)
- Morning Telegraph
