= Telegram (disambiguation) =

A telegram is a written or printed telegraph message.

Telegram also commonly refers to:

- Telegram (software), an instant messenger service also known as Telegram Messenger

Telegram or Telegramme may also refer to:

== Music ==
- Telegram (album), 1996, by Björk
- Telegram (EP), 2004, by Kate Miller-Heidke
- "Telegram" (song), by Silver Convention, 1977
- "Telegram", a 1976 song by Nazareth on the album Close Enough for Rock 'n' Roll

== Newspapers ==
- The Telegram, St. John's, Newfoundland, Canada
- The Telegram (Herkimer), Herkimer, New York, US
- The Daily Telegram, Adrian, Michigan, US
- Telegram & Gazette, Worcester, Massachusetts, US, known locally as The Telegram
- Columbus Telegram, Ohio, US
- New York Evening Telegram, a defunct daily newspaper in New York City
- Portland Telegram, a defunct daily newspaper in the U.S. state of Oregon
- Toronto Telegram, 1876-1971, Ontario, Canada
  - Telegram Corporation, a media outlet by the Toronto Telegram and the Eaton family
- Winnipeg Telegram, 1898-1920, Manitoba, Canada

== Other uses ==
- Diplomatic telegram, a confidential message between a mission and the foreign ministry
- "The Telegram" (short story), by Ian Crichton Smith
- Telegram Building, Portland, Oregon, US
- Telegram (film), a Soviet 1971 children's adventure

== See also ==
- Telegram style, minimum-word writing style
- Singing telegram, a sung message
- International Telegram (disambiguation)
- Le Télégramme, a newspaper in Morlaix, Finistère, France
