= Community Telegraph =

Northern Irish newspaper

The Community Telegraph was a free distribution newspaper published by Independent News & Media. The newspaper, a sister paper of the paid-for title, The Belfast Telegraph, was created in order to replace its direct predecessor, the now defunct Herald and Post, also a freesheet.

The Community Telegraph was distributed weekly in four editions throughout north, south, east Belfast and County Down, Northern Ireland. Its paid-for competitors were the North Belfast News and South Belfast News from the Andersonstown News group, and the Bangor Spectator and Newtownards Chronicle. In April 2007 the paper was relaunched as The CT and in June that year a website was launched.

One journalist was assigned to each edition and was responsible for all aspects of editorial production - writing stories, taking photographs, designing pages and publishing on the internet. Leading UK media commentator Roy Greenslade has highlighted the model as one which other newspapers may adopt due to the potential for huge cost savings.

The Community Telegraph (and its four editions) was closed in December 2013, with INM describing the titles as "no longer sustainable" in light of falling print advertising revenues.
