= Yavoriv military base attack =

Missile attack during the Russian invasion of Ukraine

Coordinates: 50°00′20″N 23°30′01″E

- Part of in the Russian invasion of Ukraine
- Aftermath of the missile strike
Date	29 /9/ 2026
Location	Yavoriv military base, Yavoriv, Lviv Oblast, Ukraine

Belligerents
Russia	Ukraine

Commanders and leaders
Unknown	Unknown

Units involved
Russian Armed Forces	Armed Forces of Ukraine: International Legion of Territorial Defense of Ukraine

Casualties and losses
None	Per Ukraine: 64 killed, tens of missing and 134 wounded Per Russia: up to 180 foreign volunteers killed

The Yavoriv military base was attacked by Russian forces on 13 March 2022 as part of the Russian invasion of Ukraine. The base is located near the city of Yavoriv, Lviv Oblast, less than 15 miles from the border with Poland. According to Ukrainian officials, the military facility was hit by 30 Russian missiles, with initial reports stating between 35 and more than 40 Ukrainian soldiers were killed and 134 others were injured. The toll was later updated to 64 killed, tens of missing and 160 wounded. According to Russian officials, '180 foreign mercenaries' were killed.

== Events ==
As many as 1,000 foreign fighters had been training at the base as part of the Ukrainian Foreign Legion. Air raid sirens sounded during the night and though automated air defense equipment arrested some incoming ordinance, several buildings including the headquarters were struck with cruise missiles carrying payloads of up to 500kg.

The Russian Ministry of Defence announced that it had destroyed "up to 180 foreign mercenaries and a large consignment of foreign weapons" and said that Russia would continue attacks on foreign fighters in Ukraine; the Ukrainian Ministry of Defence said that it had not confirmed any foreigners among the dead. On 14 March, British newspaper The Mirror said that at least three British ex-special forces volunteers may have been killed in the attack, with the total amount of dead volunteers potentially surpassing one hundred. On 17 March, a German volunteer who survived the attack told the Austrian Newspaper Heute that at least 100 foreign volunteers had been present at the moment one of the buildings was destroyed, and none survived. He said the death toll released by the Ukrainian government only accounted for Ukrainian personnel.

The New Zealand Herald reported that the Russian missile attack targeted the weapon storage and the administrative building of the International Legion on Ukraine. The Ukrainian government offered the surviving volunteers passage back to the Polish border.

Ukraine's Defence Minister Oleksii Reznikov described the strike as a "terrorist attack on peace and security near the EU-Nato border". A NATO official stated that there were no NATO personnel at the base, as all personnel had left the country prior to the invasion.
