= Telegraph Peak =

Telegraph Peak may refer to:

- Telegraph Peak (California)
- Telegraph Peak (Lander County, Nevada)
