= Kourosh Sehati =

Iranian journalist and human rights activist

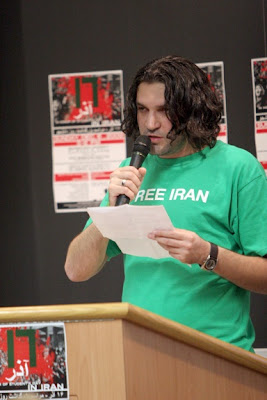
- Kourosh Sehati

Personal details
- Born: 7 April 1978 (age 48) Tehran, Iran
- Education: George Mason University, Birkbeck, University of London
- Occupation: Journalist

Military service
- Allegiance: Ukraine
- Branch/service: International Legion of Territorial Defense of Ukraine
- Years of service: 2025
- Battles/wars: Russo-Ukrainian War; Russian invasion of Ukraine

Kourosh Sehati (کوروش صحتی in Persian) (born 7 April 1978) is an Iranian journalist and a human rights activist.

Sehati was expelled from the Islamic Azad University of Varamin because of his political activities and help in the organization of the July 1999 student pro-democracy protests against the Iranian government.

== Arrests ==
He was arrested several times between 2000 and 2004 and spent around three years in prison. While being in Sepah prison, which belongs to the Revolutionary Guards of Iran, Sehati spent eight months in a solitary cell. As a prisoner of conscience, he experienced torture. Because of his activities focused on support of the democratic movements, freedom of speech, and human rights in Iran, the authorities of Iran threatened his family members several times. The government was also behind the banishment of Gozaresh-e-Rooz newspaper and Hoviat-e-Kheesh weekly magazine, where he worked as a political editor and a member of the editorial board.

After several arrests and detention terms, he decided to proceed with his media and human rights activists from abroad for safety reasons. Sehati fled to Turkey in 2004 and was then accepted by United Nations High Commissioner for Refugees as a political refugee.

Sehati has lived in the United States for more than twelve years and during that time has been interviewed by many TV channels and radio stations about his activities in Iran and on the topic of current Iranian issues.

== Work ==
Sehati worked for the Persian service of Voice of America based in Washington, D.C., as an international broadcaster, anchor, and producer from 2007 until August 2016. He worked as a news editor for the Iran International TV channel in London, UK, until the end of 2025.

His reports usually focus on political issues in Iran, as well as on human rights and democratic movements, particularly those of students, workers, and women.

He holds a BA degree in political science from George Mason University in Virginia and an MS degree in International Security from Birkbeck, University of London.

== Military service ==
On 18 March 2025, Sehati announced he had joined the Armed Forces of Ukraine to defend against the Russian invasion. He is the first Iranian foreign volunteer for Ukraine, explaining, "Russia hurt Iran a lot over the last 200 years."

== Personal life ==
His wife is Ukrainian, and they have two kids. His uncle, Ali Sehati, was executed by the Iranian government in 1981, when Ali was a teenager.
