= El Telégrafo (disambiguation) =

El Telégrafo is a newspaper based in Paysandú, Uruguay.

El Telégrafo may also refer to:

- El Telégrafo (Ecuador), a newspaper based in Guayaquil, Ecuador
- El Telégrafo Mercantil, a former newspaper based in Buenos Aires, Argentina

== See also ==
- Il Telegrafo, a newspaper based in Livorno, Italy
- Telegraph (disambiguation)
