= Telegraph Building =

The Telegraph Building may refer to:

- 195 Broadway, New York City, also known as the Telegraph Building
- Telegraph Building, Shanghai
- Telegraph Building (Harrisburg, Pennsylvania)
- Daily Telegraph Building, London
