= International Telegram =

International Telegram may refer to:

- International telegram, a telegram sent from one country to another
- iTelegram, a telegram-delivery service
