= Telegraph Road =

Telegraph Road may refer to:

== Streets ==
- Telegraph Road (Los Angeles), in Los Angeles County, California
- Telegraph Road (Ventura County, California), partly carrying California State Route 126
- Telegraph Road (Anne Arundel County, Maryland), carrying Maryland Route 170
- Telegraph Road (Michigan), in the Metro Detroit area, carrying U.S. Highway 24
- Telegraph Road (St. Louis County, Missouri), carrying Missouri Route 231
- Telegraph Road (Northern Virginia), carrying State Route 241 and State Route 611
- Old Wire Road (Missouri and Arkansas), historically known as the Telegraph Road

== Music ==
- Telegraph Road (album), a 1996 album by Sonny Moorman
- "Telegraph Road" (song), a song on the Dire Straits 1982 album Love over Gold
- Telegraph Road 1977 & 2024 (song), a song on the 2024 Bastille album &

== See also ==
- Telegraph Avenue, in Alameda County, California
