= Newtownards Chronicle =

Northern Irish newspaper

- "YOUR COMMUNITY… YOUR VOICE… YOUR LOCAL NEWSPAPER"
- Type: Weekly Newspaper
- Format: Tabloid
- Owner: Alexander family
- Founded: 1873
- Language: English
- Headquarters: 25 Frances Street, Newtownards, BT23 7DT
- Website: https://newtownardschronicle.co.uk/

The Newtownards Chronicle, (formally The Newtownards Chronicle & Co. Down Observer) established in 1873, is a local weekly newspaper based in Newtownards, Northern Ireland. The newspaper, referred to locally as The Chronicle, serves the communities of Ards, Ards peninsula, Comber, Dundonald and the Greater Ards area. It is published on Thursdays.

The Newtownards Chronicle is family-owned, by the Alexander family. David Edward Alexander is the managing director. It was incorporated in August 1948.
