= Telegraph Peak (Lander County, Nevada) =

Mountain in Lander County, Nevada

Coordinates: 39°33′18″N 117°02′22″W

Telegraph Peak is a summit in the U.S. state of Nevada. The elevation is 8,537 feet (2,602 m).

Telegraph Peak was named in commemoration of the first transcontinental telegraph.
