= Telegraph (Bulgarian newspaper) =

Bulgarian daily newspaper

The Telegraph (Bulgarian: Телеграф) is a Bulgarian national daily newspaper published in Sofia. It was established in January 2005 as a low-cost, short-article alternative to the mainstream press. Its circulation rose rapidly: in May 2005 it was 38,000, but by April 2007 it had reached 80,000. By early 2008, it was estimated to be the national leader with 110,000 copies sold on some days.

The paper belongs to a Bulgarian company which also publishes the Monitor daily and Politika weekly.

As of February 2008, the newspaper's website shows only its front page.
