= 2nd International Legion =

International Legion unit

- 2-й Інтернаціональний легіон 2-i Internatsionalnyi lehion
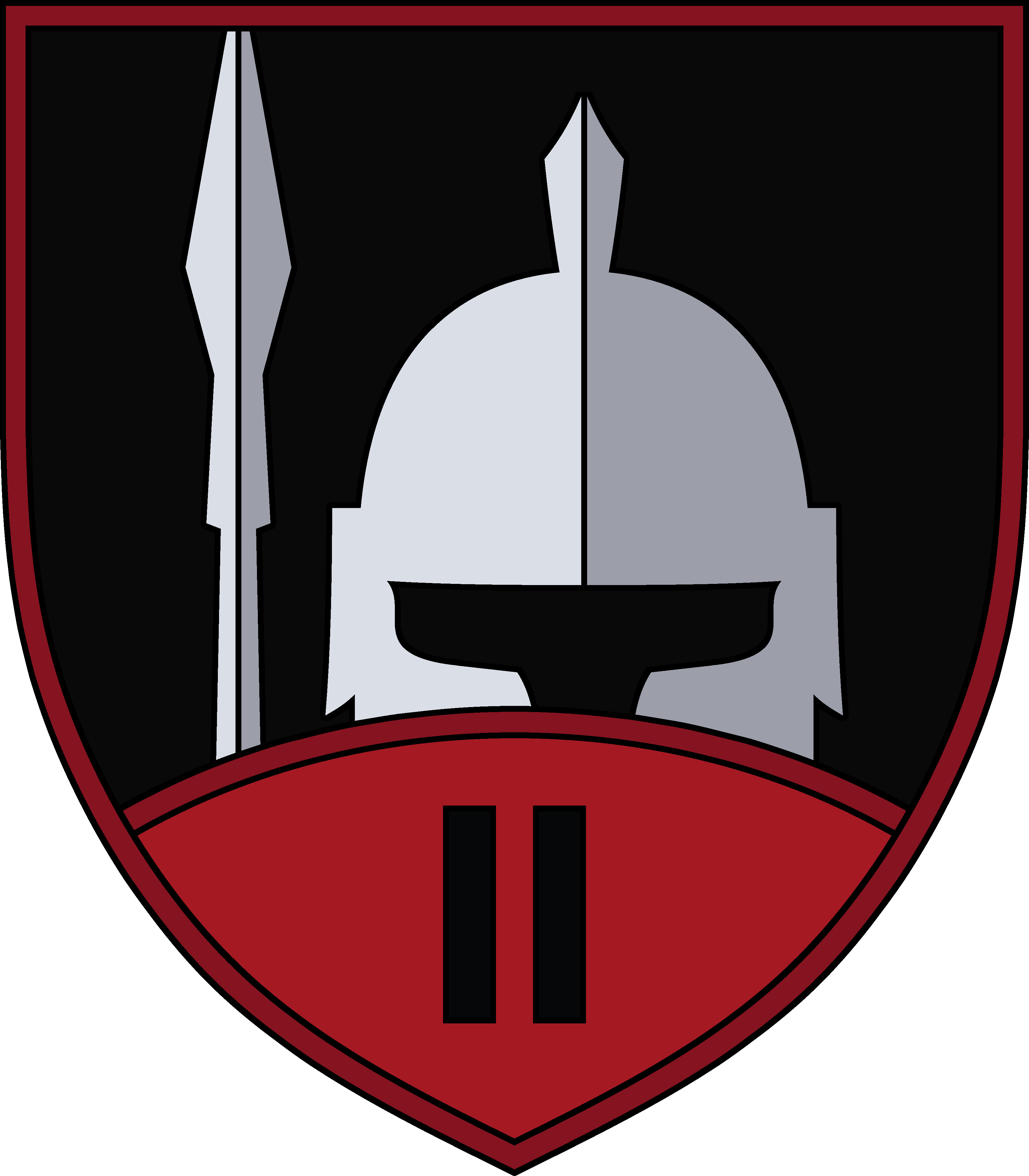
- Shoulder sleeve insignia
- Active: April 2022 – 31 December 2025
- Country: Ukraine
- Branch: Ukrainian Ground Forces
- Type: Foreign volunteer battalion
- Role: Light infantry
- Size: 500 (September 2022)
- Part of: International Legion for the Defence of Ukraine
- Motto: "Viribus Unitis"
- Engagements: Russo-Ukrainian war; Russian invasion of Ukraine; Eastern front; Kharkiv counteroffensive; Kreminna–Lyman front; Kursk incursion
- Website: Official Website

Commanders
- Notable commanders: Col. Ruslan Myroshnychenko (October 2022 – March 2025); Major Oleksandr Yakymovych (March 2025 – December 2025)

Insignia
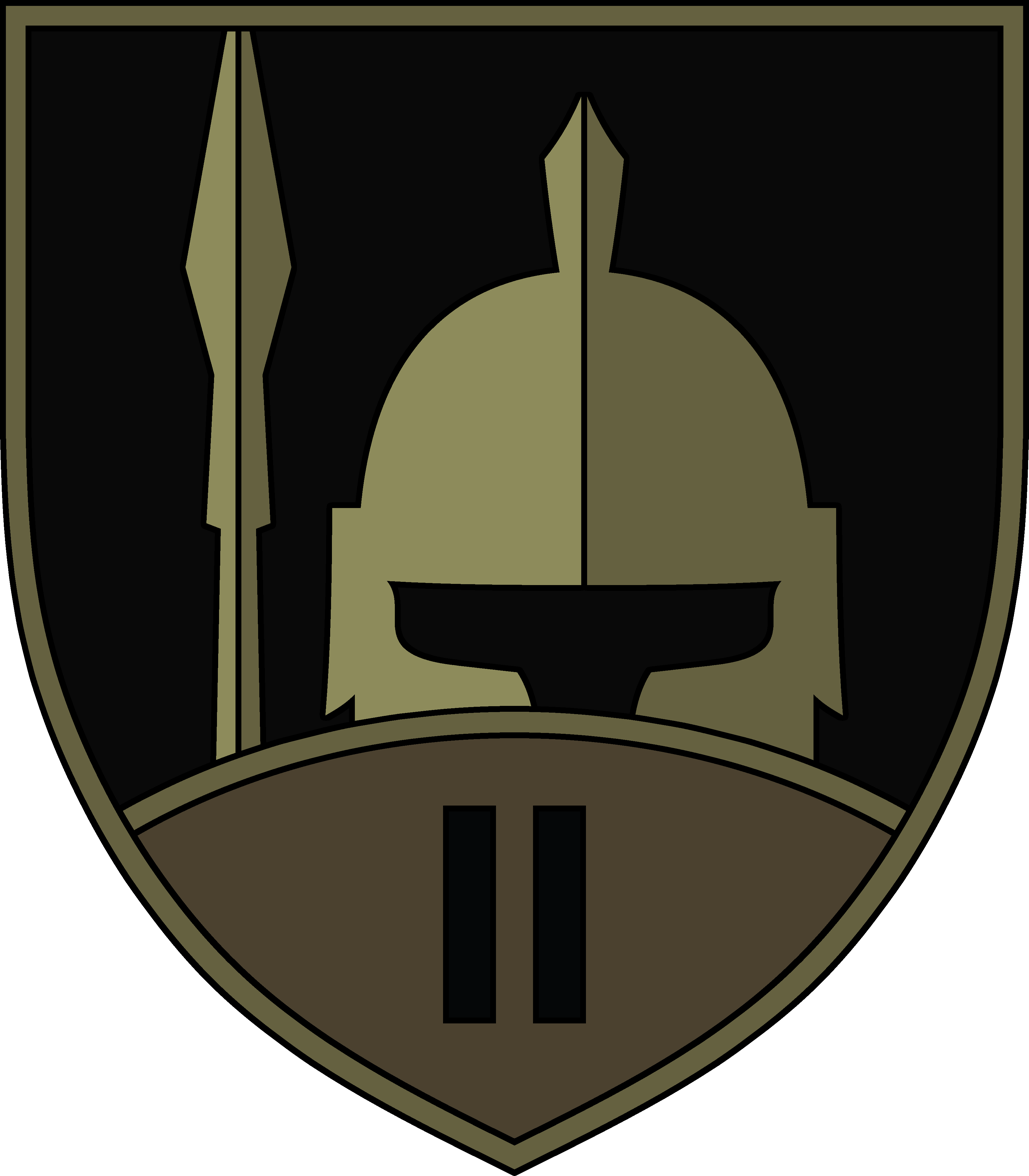
- Field insignia

The 2nd International Legion (Note: Ukrainian: 2-й Інтернаціональний легіон, romanized: 2-i Internatsionalnyi lehion) was a formation of the Ukrainian Armed Forces which functioned as part of the International Legion Defence of Ukraine. It was originally formed in the spring of 2022. The 2nd Legion was one of three combat units within the structure of the International Legion. As the Legion 2nd Battalion, it was formed by Colonel Ruslan Myroshnychenko from the 'Special Purpose Group' that fought at Battle of Lysychansk and Hryhorivka in spring and summer of 2022. According to the battalion's website, its fighters came from thirty countries, including Ukraine, Georgia, Belarus, Moldova, Poland, Lithuania, Estonia, Italy, England, Germany, Denmark, Norway, Finland, Faroe Islands, Belgium, Cyprus, Israel, Colombia, Peru, Brazil, Australia, Japan and the United States.

The Legion was deployed at the hottest areas of the front line in eastern Ukraine, and was involved in the combat in the Luhansk Oblast after the Kharkiv Counteroffensive of 2022, fighting in the Serebryansky Forest at Kreminna, as well as at Chasiv Yar, Pokrovsk, and in the Kursk campaign.

== History ==
=== Formation ===
On 27 February 2022, Ukrainian President Volodymyr Zelenskyy made an announcement declaring the establishment of an international fighting force to assist in defending the sovereignty and independence of Ukraine amidst the Russian invasion. Alongside the founding of an International Legion, different battalions, teams and groups were formed, and each battalion became standalone fighting units.

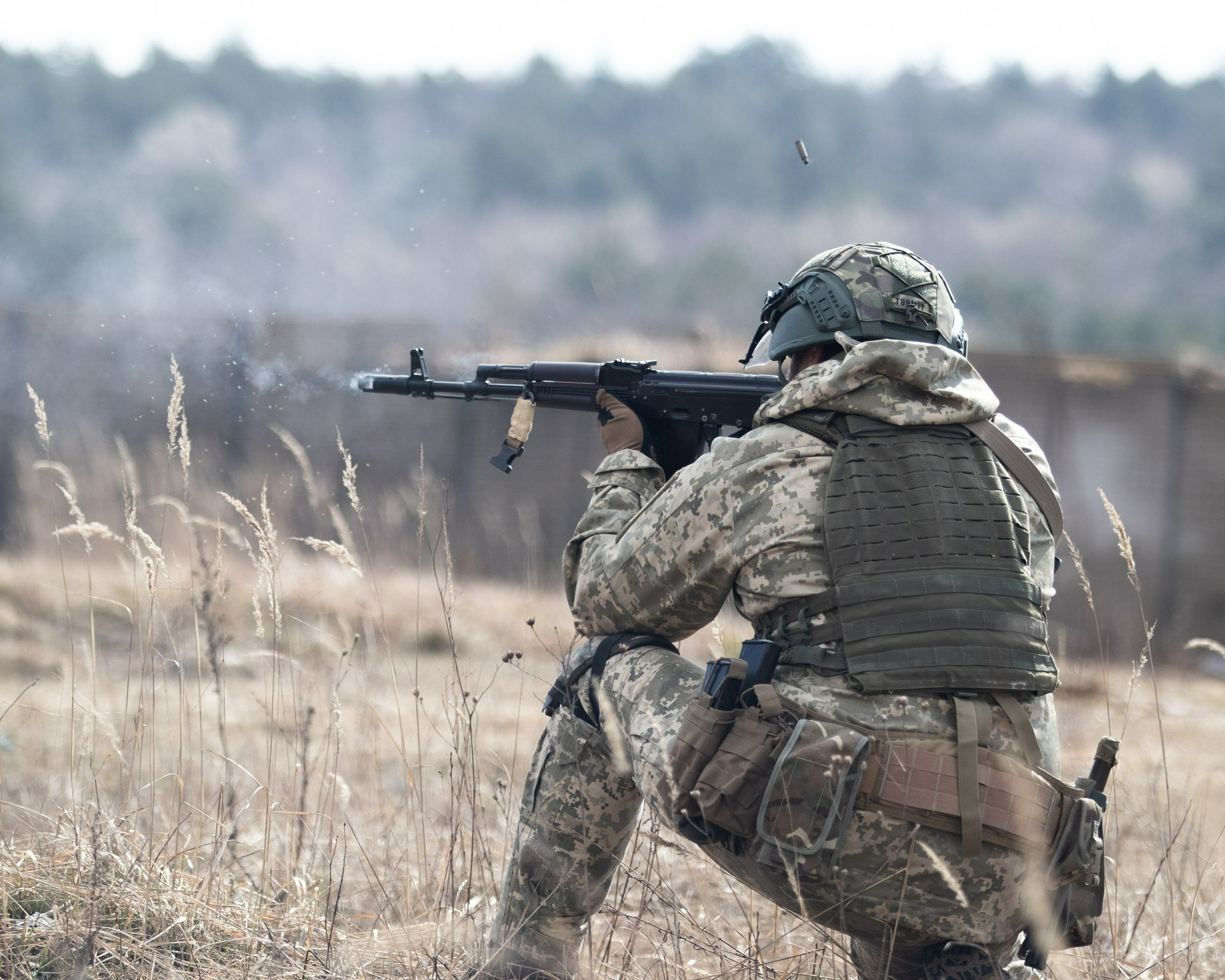
Infantrymen of the battalion, with an AK-74 during rifle training, March 2023.

Initially several battalions including the 1st Infantry Battalion, the 'Wolf Hound' Battalion, the 'Special Purpose Battalion' and what became the 3rd Legion Battalion were created within the International Legion, with the 2nd Battalion being officially formed several months later from a combination of existing teams, members of the 'Special Purpose Group' (Spetspryz) and Georgian Legion, legionnaires transitioning from other army units, and newer recruits.

It was reported that the battalion had been created during the combat operations undertaken by the International Legion during the Kharkiv counteroffensive in September 2022. The unit was formed on the basis of First International Company of Ukrainian Special Operations Forces. Indications for another battalion being created in the International Legion date back prior to Bohdan, a previous leader of the 1st Infantry Battalion, stating that weapons allegedly going missing were diverted to another unit within the Legion.

The battalion was formed by recruiting individuals from several nations with its insignia reflecting this, initially and largely comprising: Ukrainians, Belarusians, and Georgians, who were initially part of a 'Special Purpose Battalion'. Over time many other fighters of various nationalities have joined the 2nd Battalion, including British, Indians, Canadians, Polish, Colombians, and Americans. It was reported that the formation of the 2nd Battalion of the International Legion indicated that a fairly large number of foreign soldiers have joined the Ukrainian Armed Forces in the defence against the Russian invasion.

The Ukrainian General Staff said on 9 December 2025 that the 1st, 2nd, 3rd and 4th Battalions of the Legion would be dissolved on 31 December 2025, with a planned transfer of foreign volunteers into a new unit of assault troops with drone components. The Ukrainian General Staff reported that the International Legion of the Defence Intelligence of Ukraine would keep its status as an international unit. The Lieutenant Colonel Andrii Spivak, Deputy Artillery Commander of the 2nd International Legion, explain to the Ukrainska Pravda that such a measure would be detrimental to halting the enemy advance, and also that some fighters would withdraw from the army. In January 2026, despite being informed that the changes would take effect by the end of December, the Kyiv Post reported that many legionnaires were still ″in the dark″ about their future, criticizing the lack of information given, with an anonymous officer saying his battalion command had been making efforts to convince higher ups that they were making a mistake with the changes.

=== Russian invasion of Ukraine ===
By the end of November 2022 the battalion had enlisted 44 officers and soldiers, forming the core of the HQ and the core of the Alfa company. On 19 November 2022 Col. Ruslan Myroshnychenko was appointed to the position of the commander. Two battle groups were formed on the base of the former 2nd International Legion: one, in March 2022, for special operations along the border with Russia (acted till January 2025 including operations that maintained territory in Kursk Oblast). The battle group was led by deputy commander Major Sergiy Ilnitskyi, callsign INDIA. The second group, constituted in June 2023, is for assault and defense operations on the Eastern front, was led by the commander Myroshnychenko till January 2025.

According to him, the battle group firmly and bravely performed in Serebryansky forest from 25 June 2023 till 16 July 2024, and in Terny from 18 July 2024 till 2 August 2024. The battalion, due to losses, was withdrawn from the front-line for recovery till October 2024. After recovery, the second battle group has been deployed to Chasiv Yar, and later to Pokrovsk, till February 2025.

=== Disbandment ===
In late 2025, the Ukrainian General Staff reported that battalion was going to be disbanded on 31 December 2025, with personnel of the battalion being transferred into a unit of assault troops. Personnel of the battalion were transferred to 253rd Assault Regiment, with the transfer of personnel being fully completed on 15 March 2026. After the transfer was completed, the 3rd International Infantry Battalion was formed from the transferred personnel as a unit attached to the 253rd Assault Regiment.

=== Insignia ===
The first insignia of the battalion was a shield divided vertically. Central to the design was a vertical silver sword with a gold hilt, extending from top to bottom of the shield, the pommel of the sword featured a NATO emblem. The upper left half of the insignia displayed a Ukrainian flag, also referred to as the Ukrainian war flag with the colours being red and black as opposed to the traditional blue and yellow colours. The upper right side of the insignia was divided into two flags, the top being the flag of Georgia, and the bottom being the Free Belarus flag. These flags were chosen to reflect the nationalities of the vast majority of the battalion's initial members, predominantly Ukrainians, Georgians, and Belarusians, as well as to free these nations from Russian aggression.

The insignia also featured a variant with a tab on top of the shield, bearing the battalion's motto inscribed: "Viribus Unitis".

On 14 August 2023, the battalion changed its insignia design, being similar to the insignia of the 1st Infantry Battalion of the Legion. The new insignia changed drastically, with a shield in a red border containing a knights helmet and spear in the centre, with the upper tab being attached to the main shield with the inscription "Viribus Unitis" displayed once again. The commander of the battalion, Colonel Ruslan Myroshnychenko, stated in an interview that the insignia depicted a legionnaire warrior who consciously chose to fight for freedom, independence and justice.

In January 2025, the insignia of the battalion changed to match the traditional chevrons used by the other battalions of the International Legion and the Ukrainian Ground Forces; the force in which the Legion is subordinated to. The new insignia retains the same elements of the second generation insignia, except the two in roman numerals had now changed colour to be black.

==== Visual insignia ====
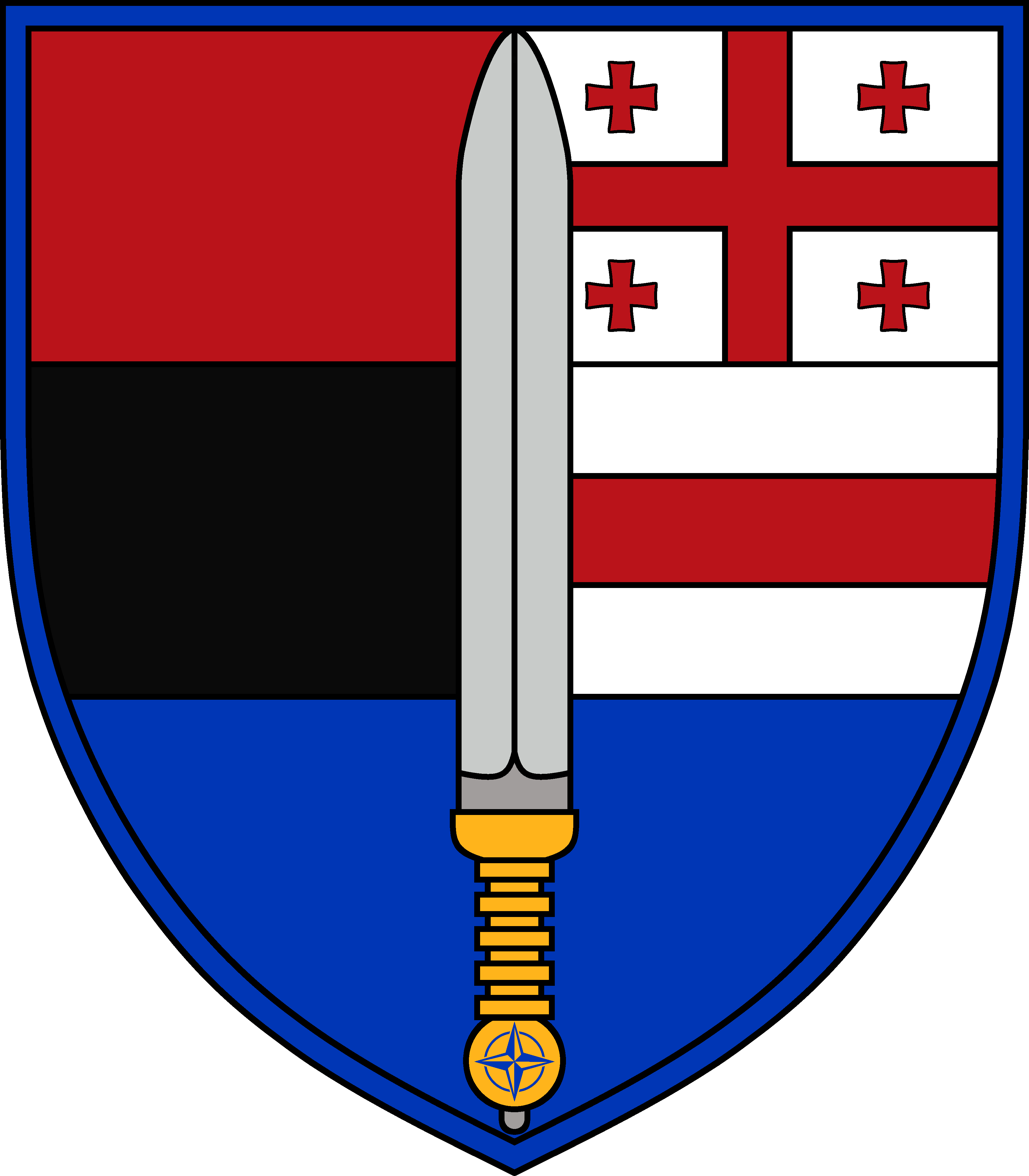
Former shoulder sleeve insignia of the 2nd Battalion.

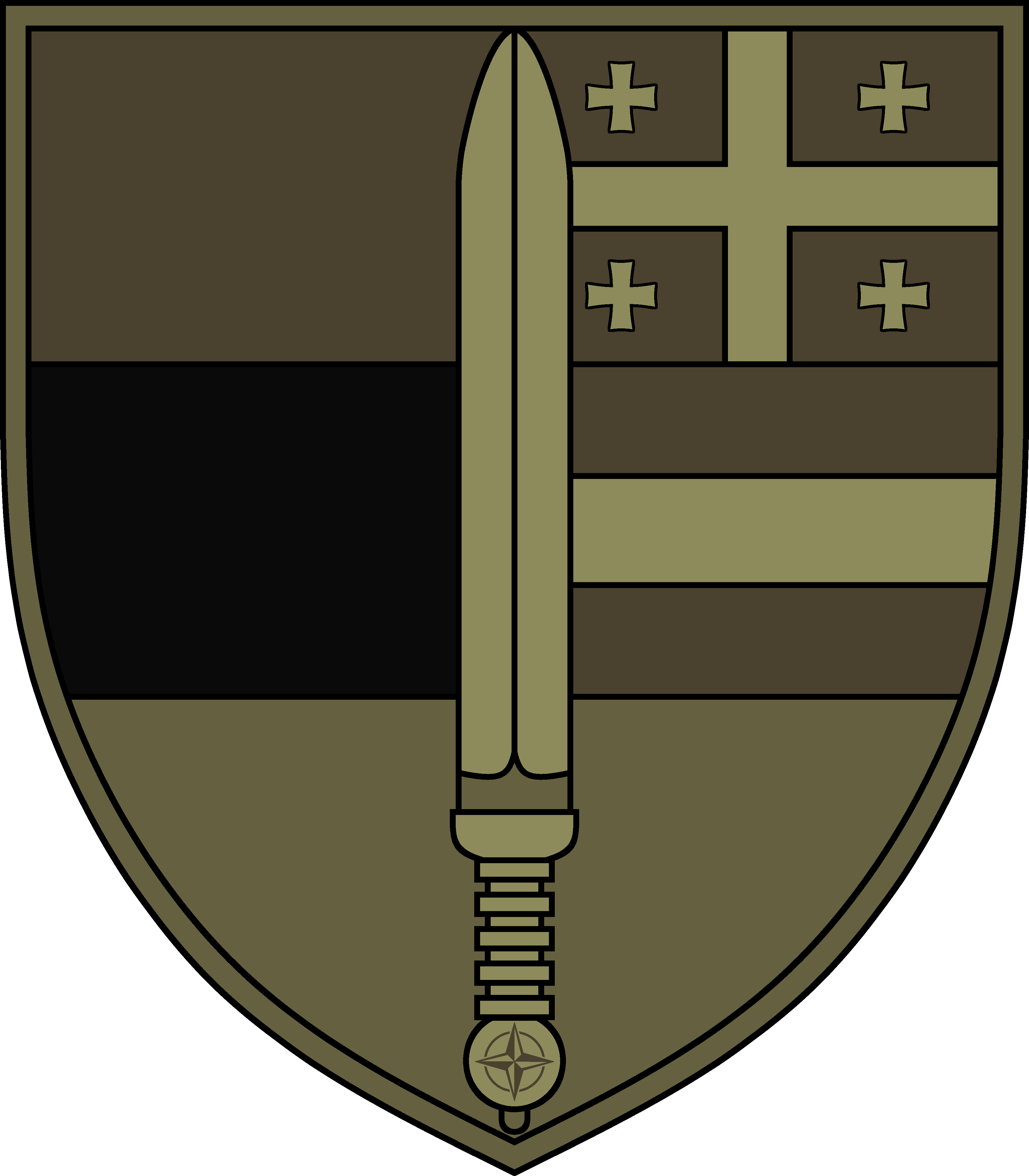
Former shoulder sleeve insignia, subdued variant, of the 2nd Battalion.

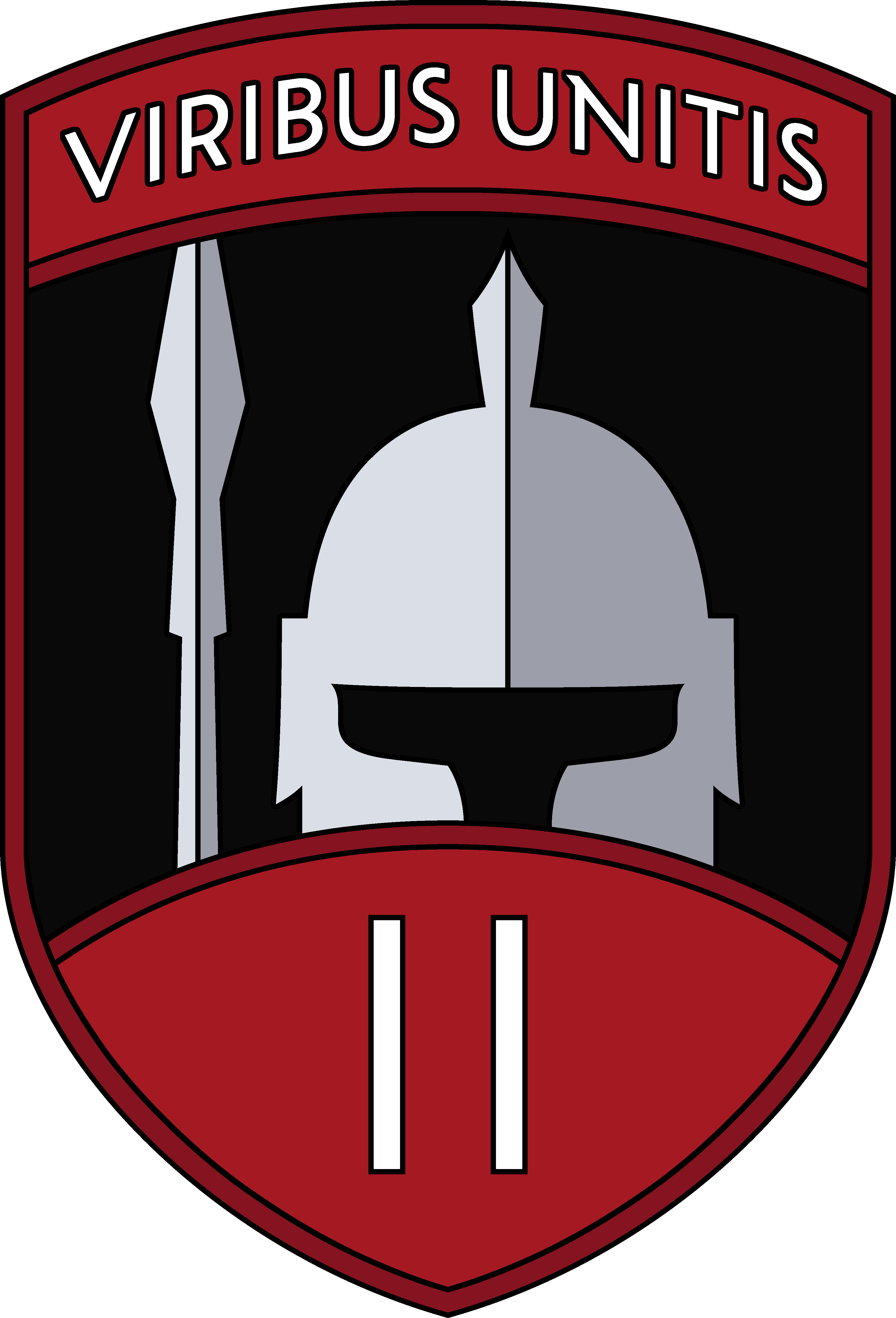
Former shoulder sleeve insignia of the 2nd Battalion.

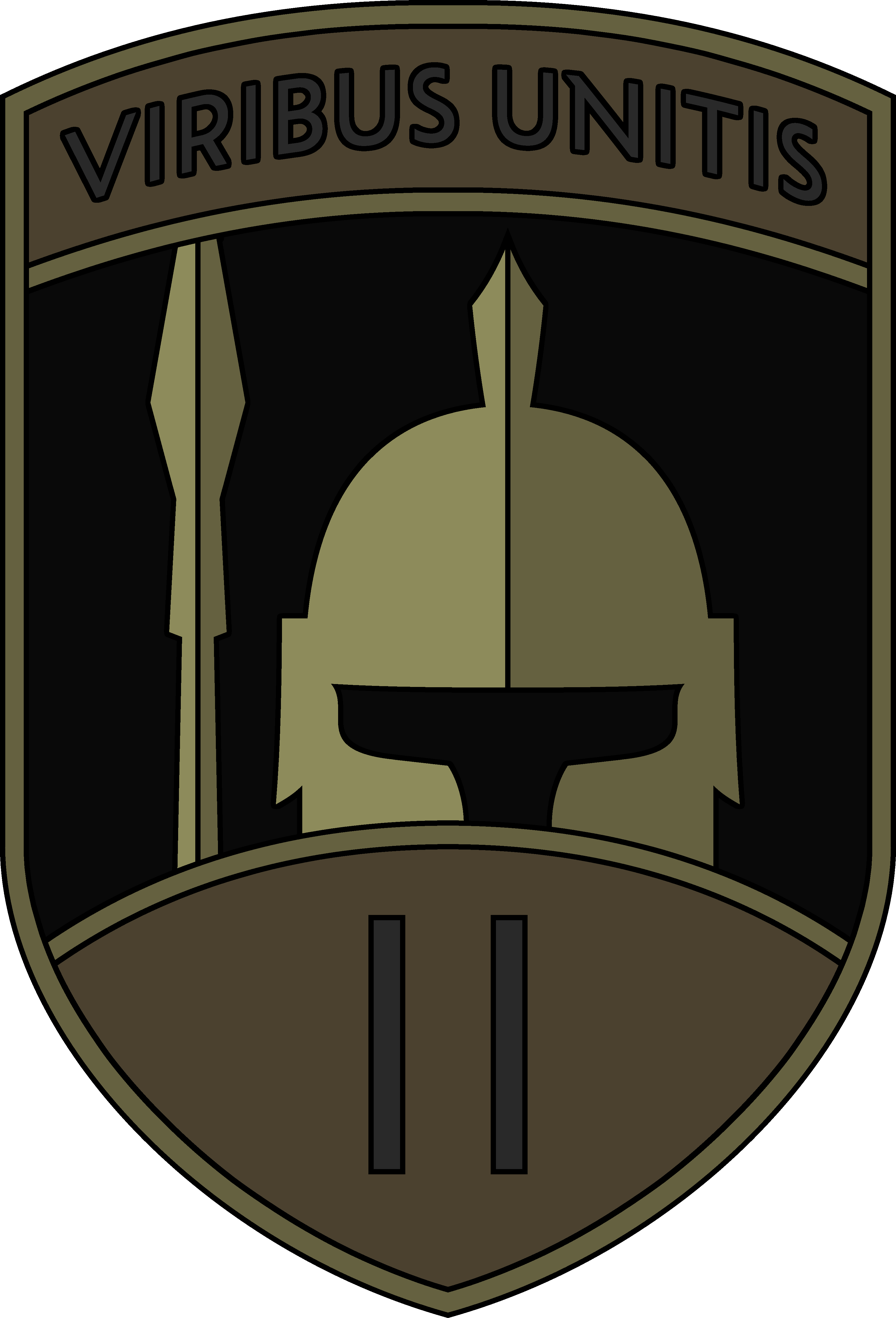
Former shoulder sleeve insignia, subdued variant, of the 2nd Battalion.

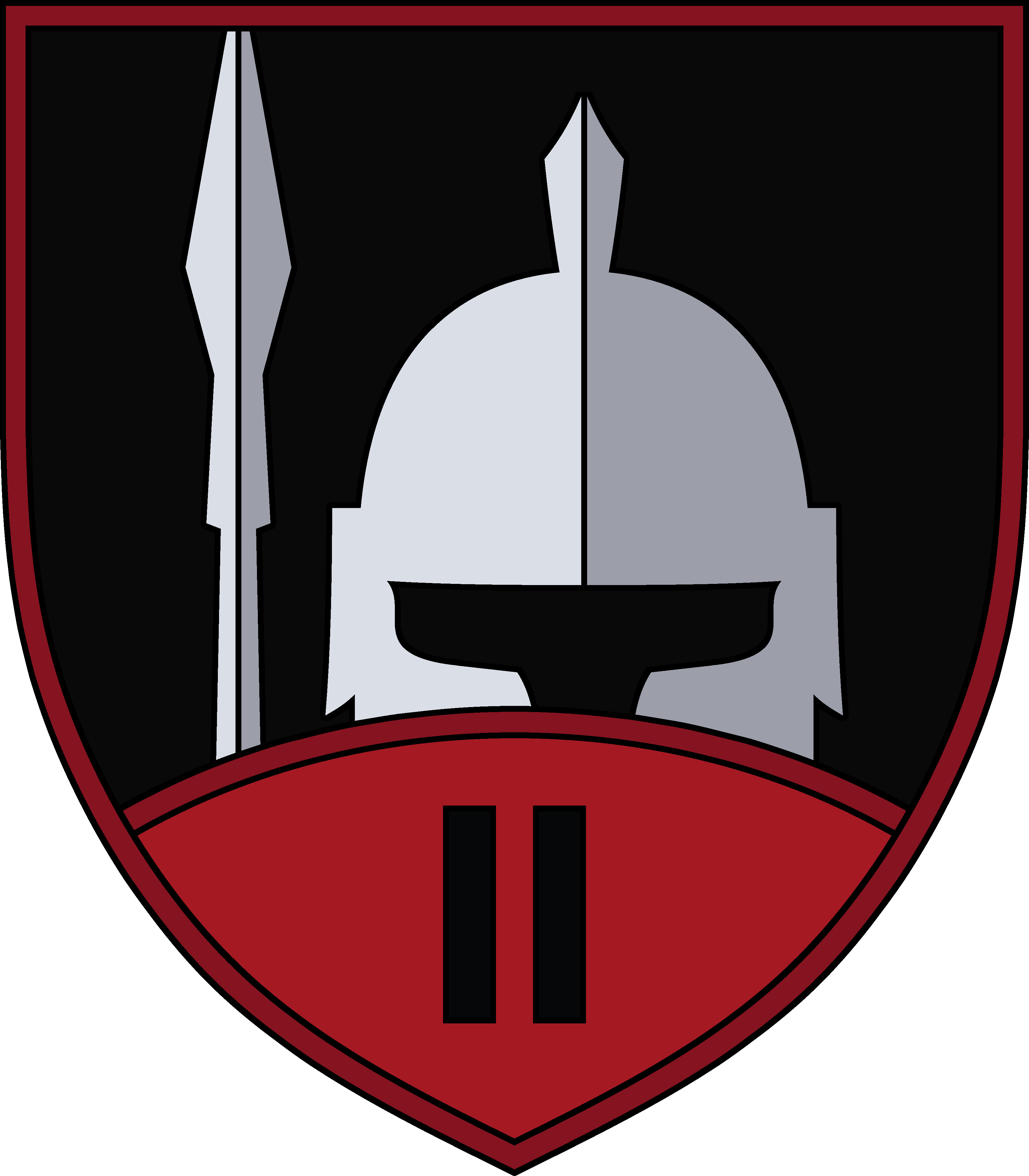
Current shoulder sleeve insignia of the 2nd Battalion.

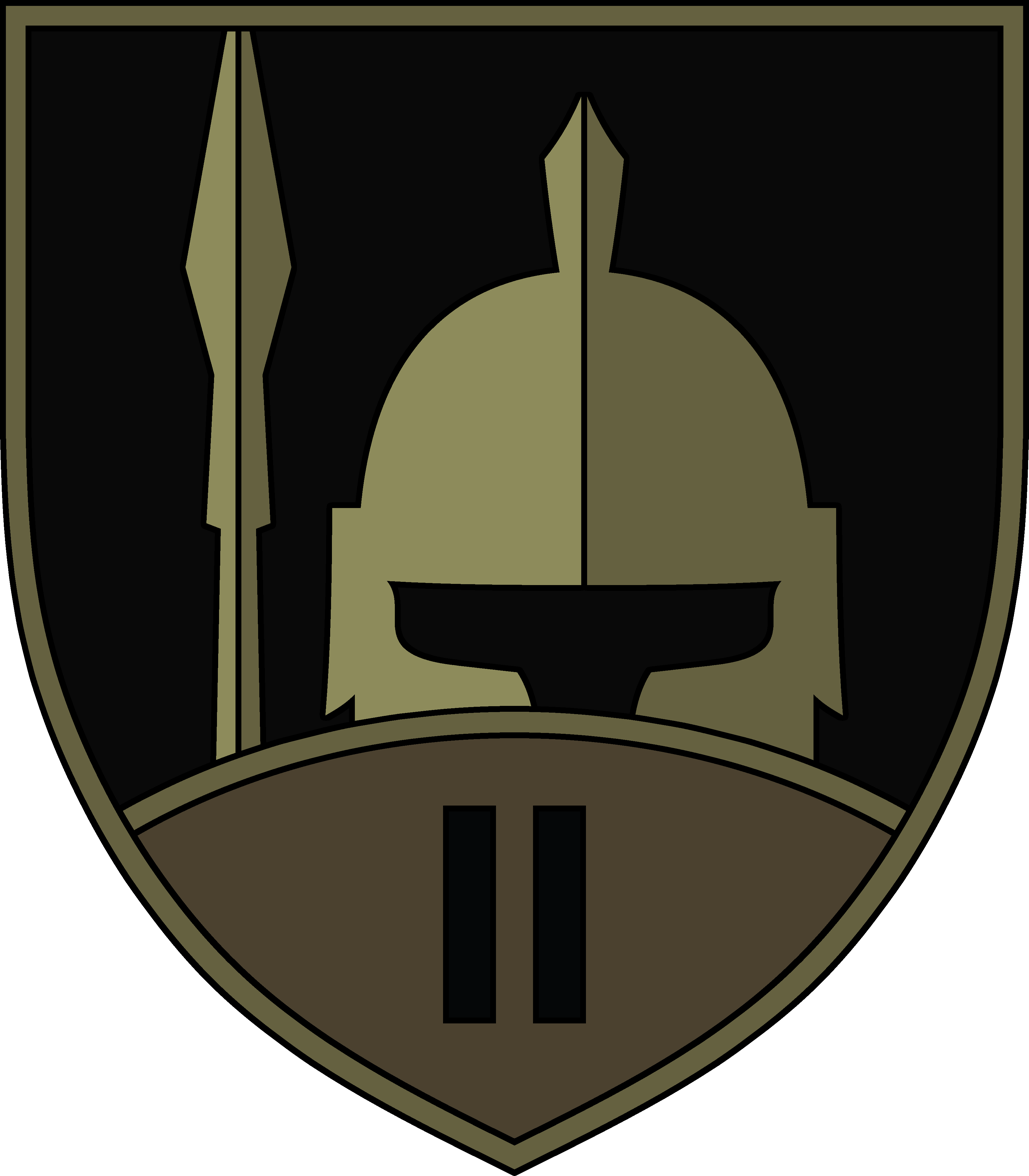
Current shoulder sleeve insignia, subdued variant, of the 2nd Battalion.

== Equipment ==
=== Small arms ===
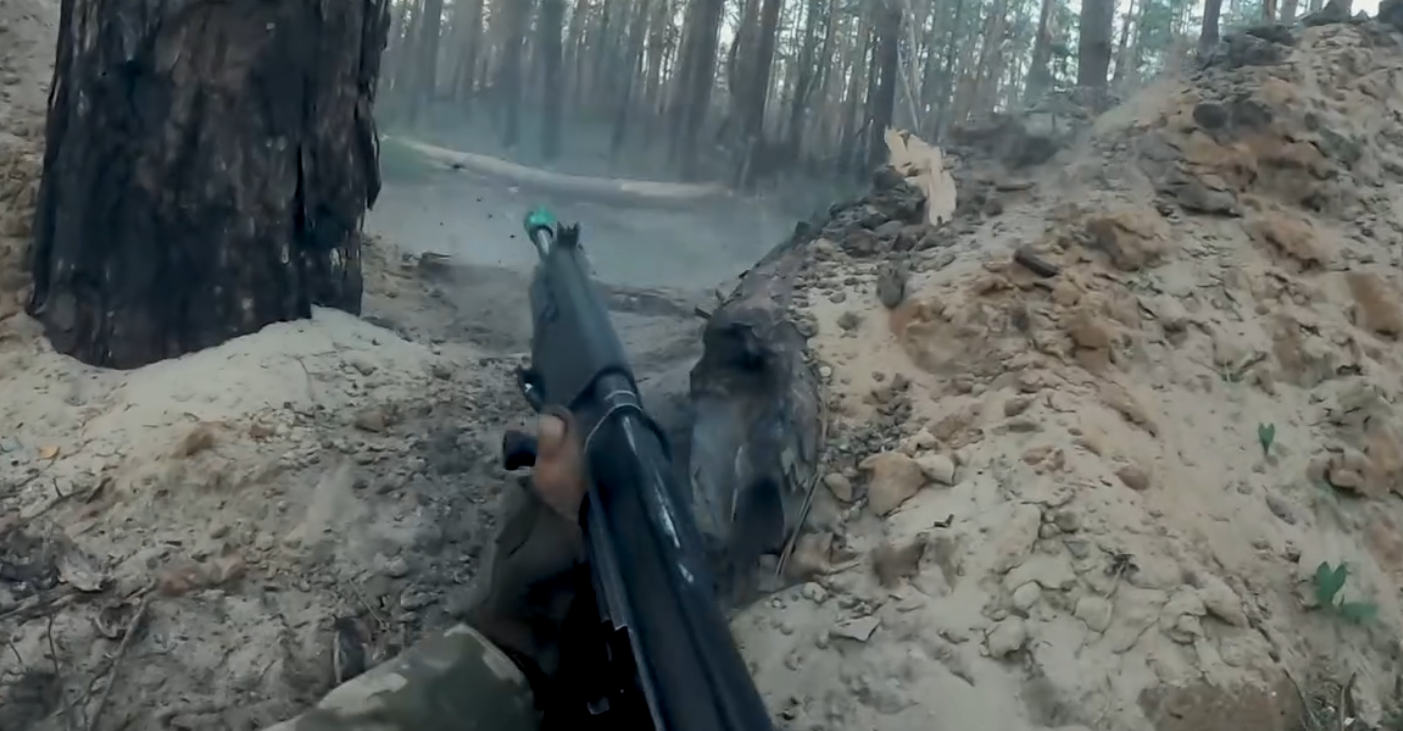
First-person view of a soldier, with an FN FAL, in the battalion during combat, September 2023.

The battalion uses many different small arms weapons, official publications by the brigade show an extensive mix of Western and Soviet/Russian surplus of rifles. Primarily, soldiers utilise rifles within the Kalashnikov rifle series, such as the AKM, AK-74, AK-74M, and the AKS-74U. These rifles have also been seen with other modifications to improve the reliability and accuracy of the weapon, including foregrips, stocks, suppressors, telescopic sights, and new parts of the rifle including dust covers and handguards to improve ergonomics.

Additionally, other small arms such as machine guns include the Soviet PKM machine gun, as well as Western made light machine guns such as the M240B in service of the brigade. Several RPK variants have also been seen in use, as well as derivatives of the infamous MG-42 general-purpose machine gun.

Other weapons within the unit also include the FN FAL which have been seen prominently across the International Legion's armory. Several other Western small arms such as AR-15 pattern rifles have also been spotted in use.

Other small arms include a derivative of the infamous German MG 42, unknown as to whether it a licensed copy under Beretta being designated as the MG42/59 or otherwise being an MG3 donated directly from the Bundeswehr since the full-scale invasion started.

As of January 2025, the brigade utilizes the following small arms:

- AKM - Soviet/Russian assault rifle
- AK-74 - Soviet/Russian assault rifle
- AKS-74U - Soviet/Russian assault rifle
- AK-74M - Russian assault rifle
- FN-FAL - Belgian battle rifle
- AR-15 - American semi-automatic rifle
- RPK-74M - Russian light machine gun
- PKM - Soviet/Russian general-purpose machine gun
- M240B - American general-purpose machine gun
- MG42 - German general-purpose machine gun

== Russo-Ukrainian war ==
=== Russian invasion of Ukraine ===
Kharkiv counteroffensive

In late 2022, the 2nd Battalion were deployed to the northeast of the Donbas near Lyman in the Kreminna Forest, which was nicknamed 'The Gates of the Donbas' by locals. Thence, the 2nd Battalion participated in the counteroffensive that led to the recapture of Lyman and the successful advance to reclaim part of western Luhansk Oblast, Ukraine's easternmost region, which had been completely occupied by the Russians. Two fighters of the 2nd Battalion were reported killed in late spring 2023: Volodymyr Trish from Lviv and Tarlan Osmanov from Baku, Azerbaijan.

While Lyman was recaptured, along with Yampil, Dibrova and Bilohorivka by the end of December 2022, the Russian retreat back into Luhansk region stalled before the occupied cities of Severodonetsk and Lysychansk. Thus, the legionaries of the 2nd Battalion began fighting in an outpost sector towards occupied Kreminna in the Serebryansky forest. This sector has been referred to as the "Lyman front" and to its south, the "Siversk front".

Operations in the Serebryansky forest

In May-June 2023, the 2nd International Legion re-entered the battles in the Luhansk region for the first time since the Battle of Lysychansk the year prior. On 25 June 2024, the battalion published that it had been holding positions in the Serebryansky forest for over a year. Publications by the battalion indicate that the deployment of the unit in combat in the Serebryansky forest dates as far back as 5-9 June 2023.

In June 2024 in the Serebryansky forest, a group of Colombian volunteers in the battalion successfully assaulted Russian positions without losses. The commander of the group was reported to be an individual by the name of "Salmo", who would later be killed in action in the defence of Ukrainian positions in the forest in July 2024. The casualties (both wounded and killed in action) intensified through 2024 until July, when the Legion was sent to fight at Terny, then withdrawn to reform and restructure.

Maria Zaitseva, a Belarusian woman whose photo taken of her during the 2020–2021 Belarusian protests went viral, joined the legion after the start of the invasion and fought with the 2nd Battalion until she was killed near Pokrovsk on 17 January 2025, several hours after her 24th birthday.

After fighting in the Battles of Kreminna Forest, the 2nd Legion participated in The Battle of Chasiv Yar and the Battle of Pokrovsk, while its North Group fought in the Kursk Offensive.

Kursk offensive (2024–2025)

The unit was known to have participated in the Kursk incursion, releasing combat footage clearing a building somewhere in Kursk Oblast.

== About The Volunteers of the Legion 2nd Battalion ==
- 'A Journey of Motivation: Volunteers of the 2nd Legion Before Deployment To The East' Феєрія мандрів про мотивацію добровольців 2-го Легіону перед відправкою на Схід
- 'India': Deputy-battalion commander: "Індія", заступник командира батальйону по бою
- 'Den': Frontline Driver/Mechanic "Ден"| водій-механик переднього краю
- Ivan Pelyk: UAV Platoon commander: Іван Пелих, син Пелих Ігор Дмитрович, командир взводу БПЛА
- 'Kiwi': Female Combat Medic from New Zealand «Ківі», жінка бойовий медик з Нової Зеландії.
- 'Mechanic': Veteran of the Maidan and Russo-Ukrainian War since 2014: «Механ», ветеран Майдану і російсько-української війни з 2014
- 'Chili': UAV Platoon commander: «Чілі», командир взводу БПЛА
- 'August': Reconnaissance Group commander: "Август", командир розвідувальної групи
- 'Jeweller': MedEvac Crew commander & Combat Medic: "Ювелір", командир екіпажу МЕДЕВАК, бойовий медик
- Deutsche Welle on 2nd Legion Volunteers: DW про колумбійськиї добровольців
- 'Father Makariy: Chaplain of the 2nd Legion: Отець Макарій, військовий капелан
- 'Paradox': MM13 Frontline MedEvac driver | «Парадокс», водій М113 медичної евакуації переднього краю
- 'Hulk' | Battalion instructor and training organisation «Халк», інструктор батальйону про специфіку організації підготовки
- 'Engels' | Chief of Medical Service «Енгельс», начальник медичної служби
- 'Koschei' | Alpha Company rifleman | "Кощей", стрілок роти Альфа
- 'Joyce' | Sergeant of Logistics | "Джойс", сержант з МТЗ роти Чарлі
- 'Yeshua' | Charlie Company Assault trooper "Єшуа", штурмовик роти Чарлі
- '13' | Alpha Company trooper | "13-й", штурмовик роти Альфа
- 'Thanos' | Charlie Company Assault trooper "Танос", штурмовик роти Чарлі
- 'Simu' | Charlie Company Assault trooper "Сіму", штурмовик роти Чарлі
- 'Tony' | Charlie Company squad leader "Тоні", командир відділення роти Чарлі
- 'Caesar' | Mortar Company squad leader, Mortar Battery | "Цезар", мінометник мінометної батареї
- 'Andriy' | FPV drone pilot | Андрій, пілот FPV дрону
- 'Ribiero' | UAV pilot Ребейро, пілот БПЛА
- 'Fletch', aka Daniel S. William Fletcher: Alpha Company Assault trooper, food relief volunteer, World Central Kitchen alumnus, writer and poet | Флетч, штурмовик роти Альфа
- 'Odyssey' aka Maria Zaitseva | Sniper and Combat Medic, known for her participation in the Belarusian resistance prior to joining the 2nd International Legion | "Одисея", снайпер
- 'Volunteers of the 2nd Legion Battalion on their Unit' | Добровольці 2-го Легіону про свій підрозділ
- 'DW on the Motivation of 2nd Legion Volunteers' | DW про мотивацію добровольців 2-го Легіону
- 'Documentary Film: 'Shield of Europe', about 2nd Legion Fighters' | Документальний фільм "Щит Європи" про бійців 2-го Легіону
- 'Volunteers About Their Motivation To Fight For Ukraine' | Добровольці про свою мотивацію воювати за Україну
- Телеканал 2+2 про мотивацію іноземних добровольців

== The Fallen: Втрати ==
=== 2022 ===
- 7 July 2022 — “Elvis”, Yevhen Valeriiovych Olefirenko, Ukrainian. Killed in action in the battle for Hryhorivka
- July 2022 — Luke Lucyszyn, American. Killed in action in the battle for Hryhorivka.
- July 2022 — Bryan Young, American. Killed in action in the battle for Hryhorivka.
- July 2022 — Émile-Antoine Roy-Sirois, Canadian. Killed in action in the battle for Hryhorivka.
- July 2022 — Edward Selander Patrignani, Swedish. Killed in action in the battle for Hryhorivka.
- September 2022 — “Reaper”, Oleksii Oleksandrovych Veshchevailov, Belarusian. Killed in action in the battle for Bakhmut.

=== 2023 ===
- June 2023 — “Raven”, Volodymyr Yaroslavovych Trishch, Ukrainian. Killed in action in the Battle of the Serebryansky Forest.
- June 2023 — “Baku”, Asman Tarlanov, Azerbaijani. Killed in action in the battle for the Serebryansky Forest.
- October 2023 — “David”, David Baturin, American of Ukrainian descent. Killed in action in the battle for the Serebryansky Forest.
- 6 December 2023 — 'Irish', Yurii Anatoliiovych Savchuk, Ukrainian. Killed in action in the battle for the Serebryansky Forest.

=== 2024 ===
- May 2024 — 'Denchik', Denys Volodymyrovych Karpenko, Ukrainian. Killed in action in the battle for the Serebryansky Forest.
- June 2024 — “Phoenix”, Khvicha Gvinjishvili, Georgian. Killed in action in the battle for the Serebryansky Forest.
- July 2024 — "Chippy", Brock Greenwood, Australian. Killed in action in the Battle of Kreminna Forest.
- July 2024 — “Salmo”, Colombian. Killed in action in the Battle of the Serebryansky Forest.
- July 2024 — “Zakhar”, Zurab Yashvili, Georgian. Killed in action in the battle for the Serebryansky Forest.
- July 2024 — “Grizzly”, Andriy Volodymyrovych Kostelnyi, Ukrainian. Killed in action in the Battle of the Serebryansky Forest.
- July 2024 — James Wilton, British. Killed in action in the battle for the Serebryansky Forest.
- July 2024 — “Lemon”, Tomasz Marcin Senkala, Polish. Killed in action in the Battle for the Serebryansky Forest.
- October 2024 — "Samurai", Bruno Barros Melo, Brazilian. Killed in action in the Battle of Chasiv Yar.

=== 2025 ===
- January 2025 — “Odyssey”, Maria Zaitseva, Belarusian. Killed in action in the Battle for Pokrovsk.
- January 2025 — 'Geronimo', John James Witherspoon, American. Killed in the Battle for Pokrovsk.

== Structure ==
As of January 2025 the battalion's structure is as follows:

- 2nd Battalion International Legion
  - Battalion's Headquarters
  - Alpha Company
      - Alpha I
      - Alpha II
      - Alpha III
      - Alpha IV Fire Support Platoon
      - Alpha Drone Team
  - Bravo Company
      - Bravo I
      - Bravo II
      - Bravo III
      - Bravo IV Fire Support Platoon
      - Bravo Drone Team
  - Charlie Company
      - Charlie I
      - Charlie II
      - Charlie III
      - Charlie IV Fire Support Platoon
      - Charlie Drone Team
    - Mortar Platoon
    - Unmanned Aerial Vehicle Team
  - Chaplain Service
  - Thorne Assault Group

== See also ==
- Battle of Donbas (2022)
- Lyman front of the 2022 Kharkiv counteroffensive
- Luhansk Oblast campaign
- Kursk campaign
- Battle of Chasiv Yar
- Pokrovsk offensive
