= 3rd International Infantry Battalion =

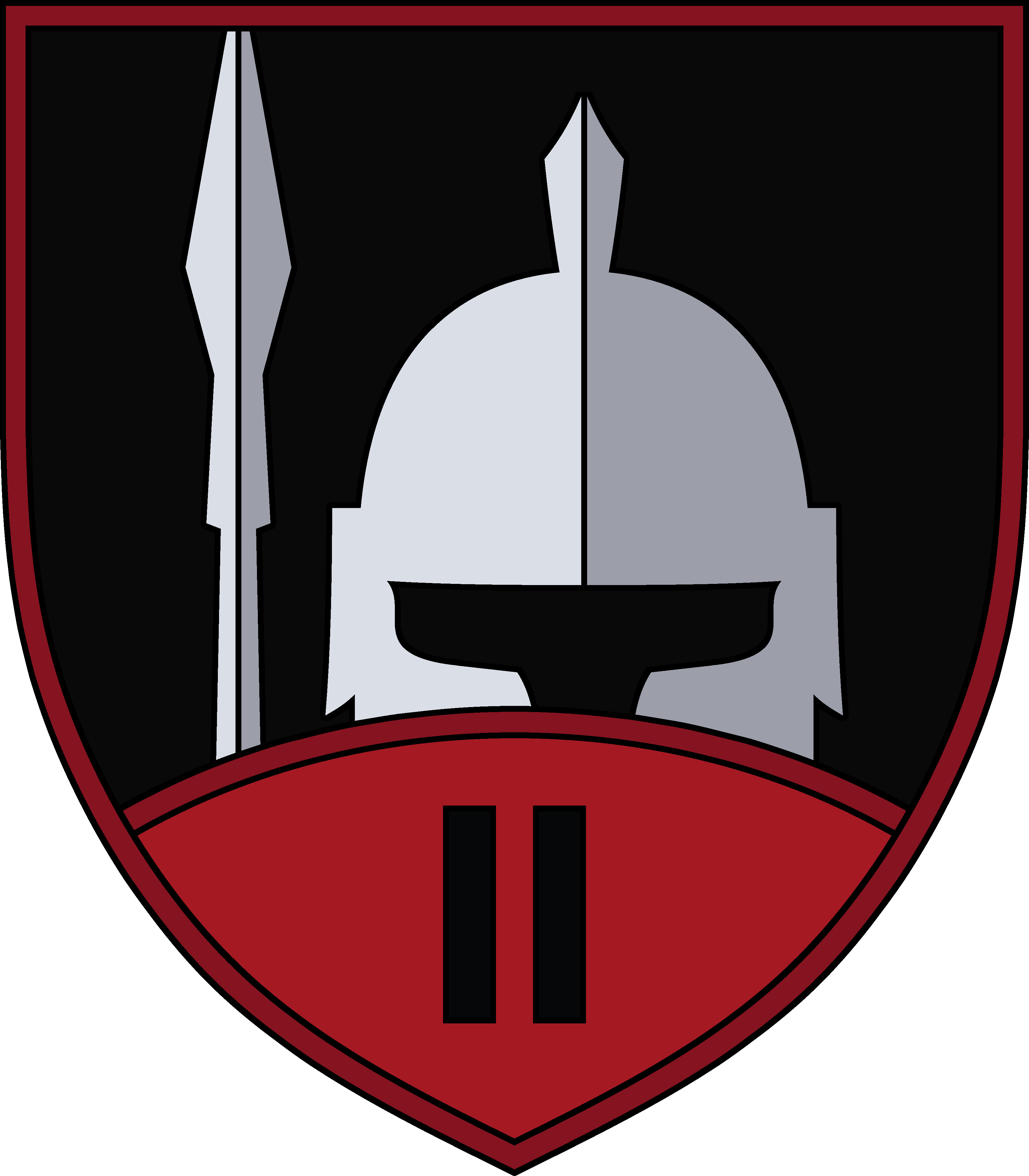
- Shoulder sleeve insignia
- Active: January 2026–Present
- Country: Ukraine
- Branch: Ukrainian Ground Forces
- Type: Foreign volunteer battalion
- Size: Unknown
- Part of: 253rd Assault Regiment
- Engagements: Russo-Ukrainian war

Commanders
- Current commander: Mykhola Velykyi (March 2026-Present)
- Notable commanders: Major Oleksandr Yakymovych (January 2026-March 2026)

The 3rd International Infantry Battalion is a battalion of the Ukrainian Ground Forces that is composed of foreign volunteers.

== History ==
The 3rd International Infantry Battalion was formed in January 2026. It was formed from former personnel of the disbanded 2nd International Legion. The battalion is attached to the 253rd Assault Regiment. The battalion was initially commanded by Major Oleksandr Yakymovych, the former commander of the 2nd International Legion. In March 2026, command of the battalion was handed over to Mykhola Velykyi, a veteran of the War in Donbas.
