= 1st Battalion International Legion =

International Legion unit

1st Infantry Battalion International Legion
- 1 піхотний батальйон Інтернаціонального легіону
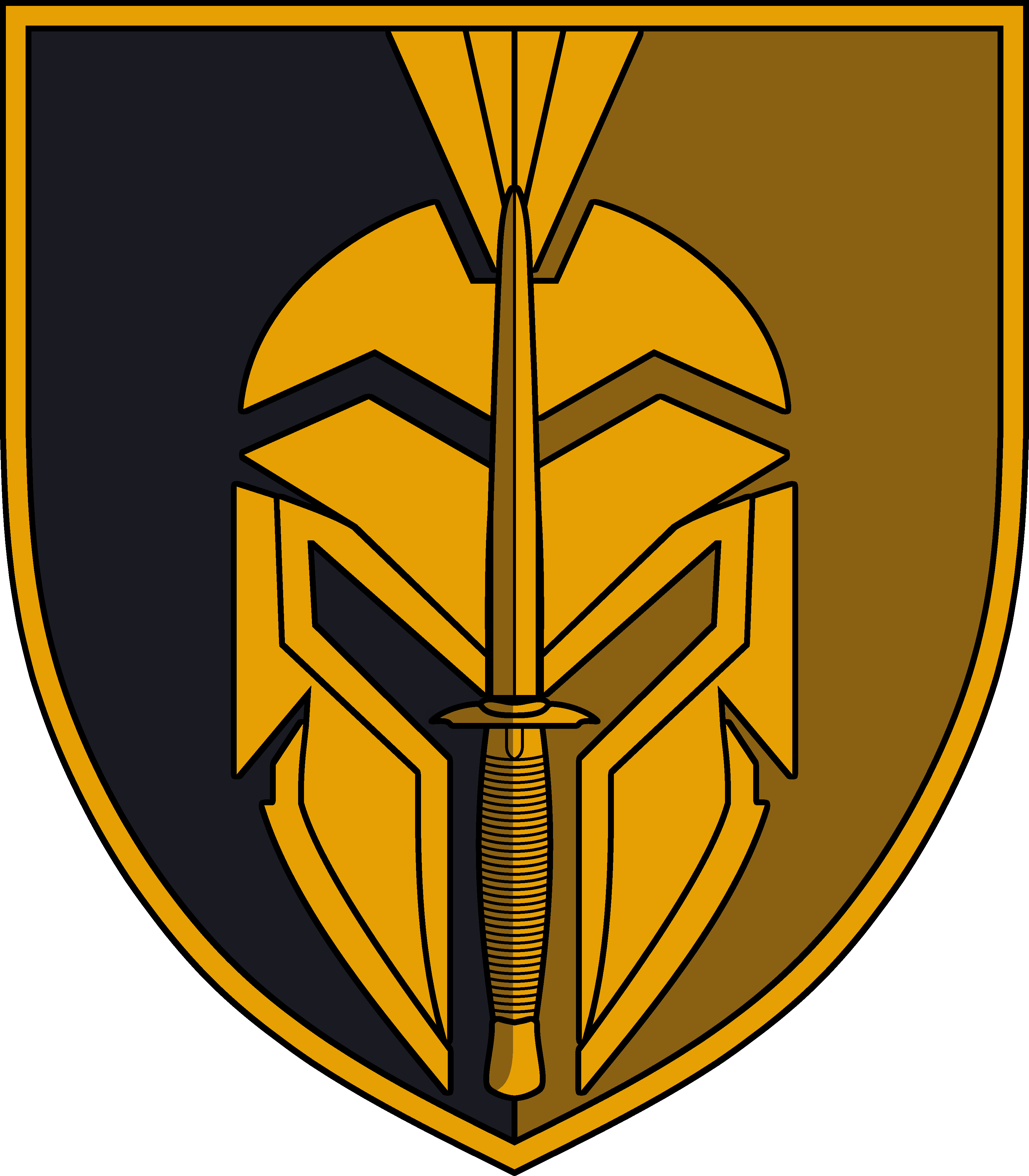
- Shoulder sleeve insignia
- Active: 1 March 2022 - 31 December 2025
- Country: Ukraine
- Branch: Armed Forces of Ukraine
- Type: Light infantry
- Size: 500 (Estimated October 2022)
- Part of: International Legion for the Defence of Ukraine (till 2023); Ukrainian Ground Forces
- Motto: "Contra Rationem"
- Engagements: Russo-Ukrainian war; Russian invasion of Ukraine; Eastern Ukraine campaign; Kharkiv counteroffensive; Battle of Kupiansk; Battle of Bakhmut; Battle of Toretsk
- Website: Official Website

Commanders
- Current commander: Unknown
- Notable commanders: Bohdan (22 February 2022 - May 2022); Anatoliy (May 2022 - unknown) Rick hop (8 march 2022 - june 2022) combat promoted to commander by acting colonel andrii khitan

Insignia
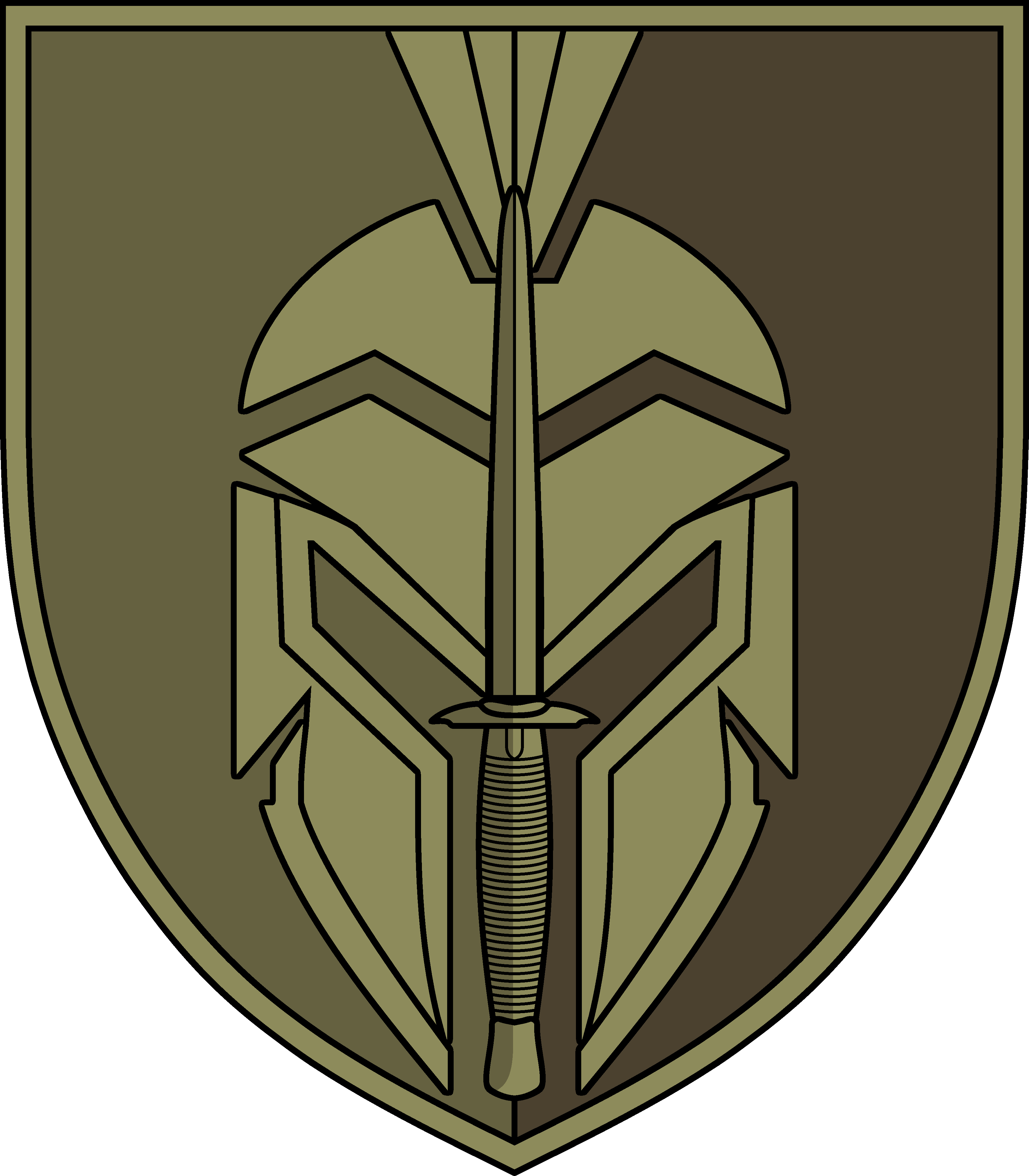
- Field insignia

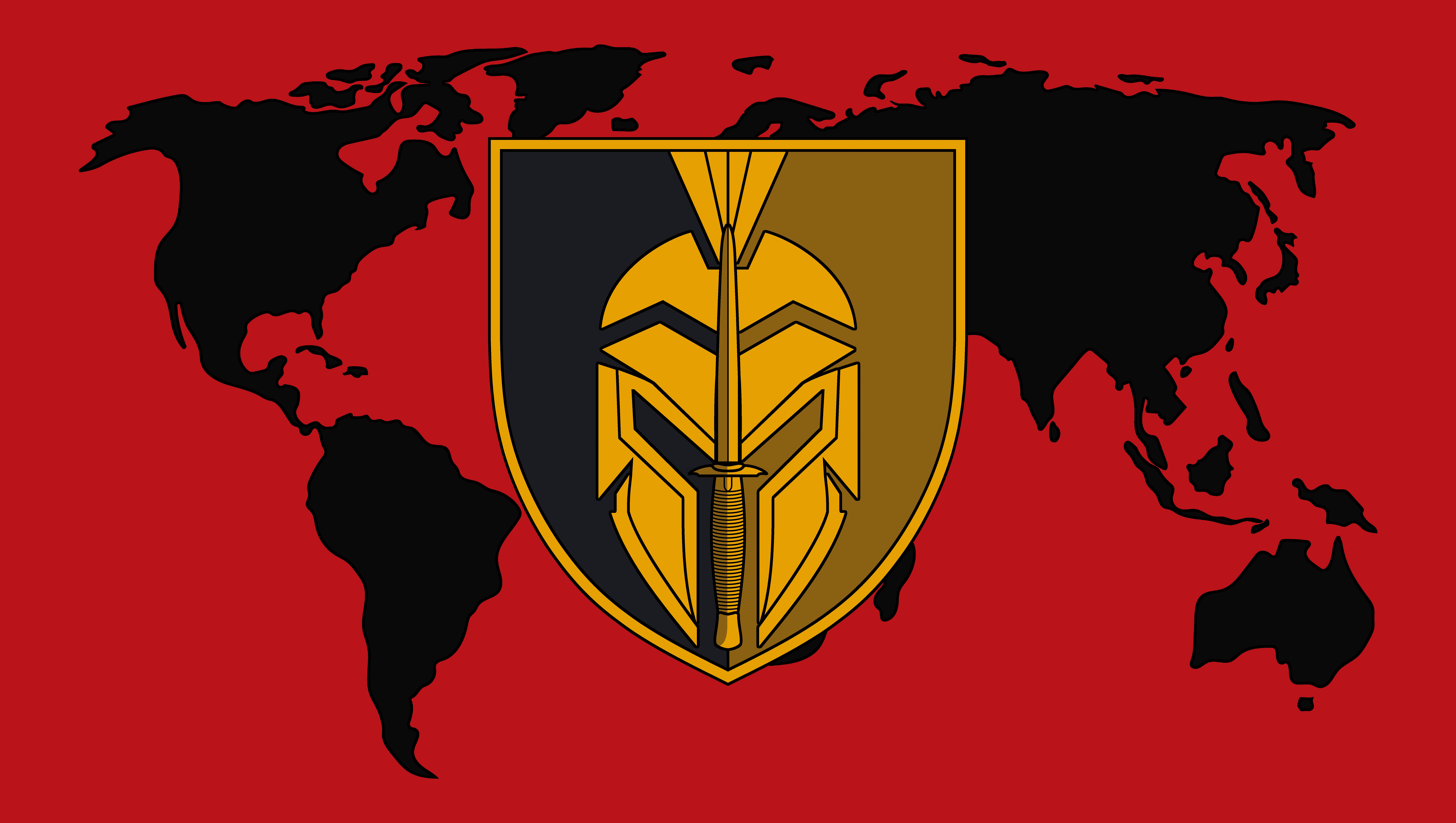
- Flag

The 1st Infantry Battalion of the International Legion (Ukrainian: 1 піхотний батальйон Інтернаціонального легіону, romanized: 1 pihotnyi batalion Internacionalnogo legionu), also commonly referred to as the 1st Battalion of the International Legion or the 1st International Legion, was a formation of the Ukrainian Armed Forces that functioned as part of the International Legion for the Defence of Ukraine. The light infantry battalion was one of four units within the structure of the International Legion, it consisted of fighters from several countries including: the United States, Croatia, Brazil, Japan, and more.

The battalion participated in crucial campaigns and battles including the Battle of Kupiansk and the Battle of Bakhmut. Prior to August 2022, the battalion used to be under the designation of 1st Battalion "Vovkodav" (Ukrainian: 1-й батальйон «Вовкодав», romanized: 1-j batalʹjon «Vovkodav») and utilised a different insignia.

== History ==
=== Formation ===
On 27 February 2022, Ukrainian President Volodymyr Zelenskyy made an announcement declaring the establishment of an international fighting force to assist in defending the sovereignty and independence of Ukraine amidst the Russian invasion. Alongside the creation of an International Legion, included the creation of battalions making up the structure of the unit. The battalion, created in March 2022, was first designated as the 1st Battalion "Vovkodav" (Ukrainian: 1-й батальйон «Вовкодав», romanized: 1-j batalʹjon «Vovkodav»), having members from several countries such as the United States, Japan, Ireland, Croatia, and more - including some veterans such as those from the United States Marine Corps.

The battalion was designated a commander by the name of "Bohdan", a military commander who reportedly does not maintain a public profile and not identified by his full name to avoid putting him in danger. Bohdan would later go on to move to the 3rd Special Purpose Battalion due to misconduct and problems within the battalion.

According to the Ukrainian General Staff, the 1st, 2nd, 3rd and 4th Battalions of the Legion will be disbanded on 31 December 2025, with a planned transfer of foreign volunteers into a new branch of assault troops with drone components. The Ukrainian General Staff reported that the International Legion of the Defence Intelligence of Ukraine will keep its status as an international unit.

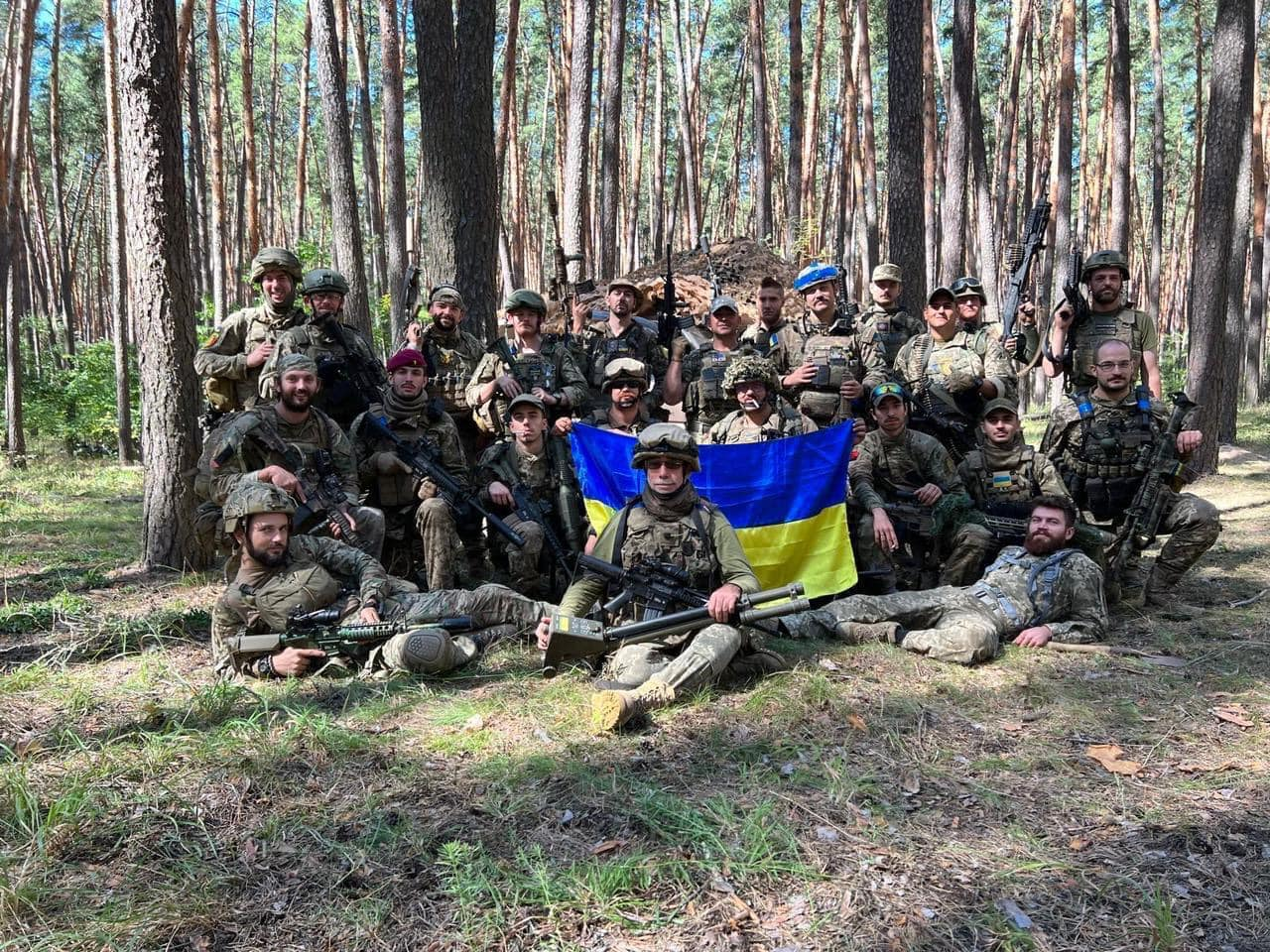
Fighters of the battalion in Ukraine, October 2022.

=== Reforms ===
In May 2022, the battalions commander changed from the Ukrainian commander "Bohdan" to another commander by the name of "Anatoliy". This came after several issues, allegations, and findings of misconduct against commander Bohdan. In August 2022 the name and insignia of the battalion changed.

=== Issues and allegations ===
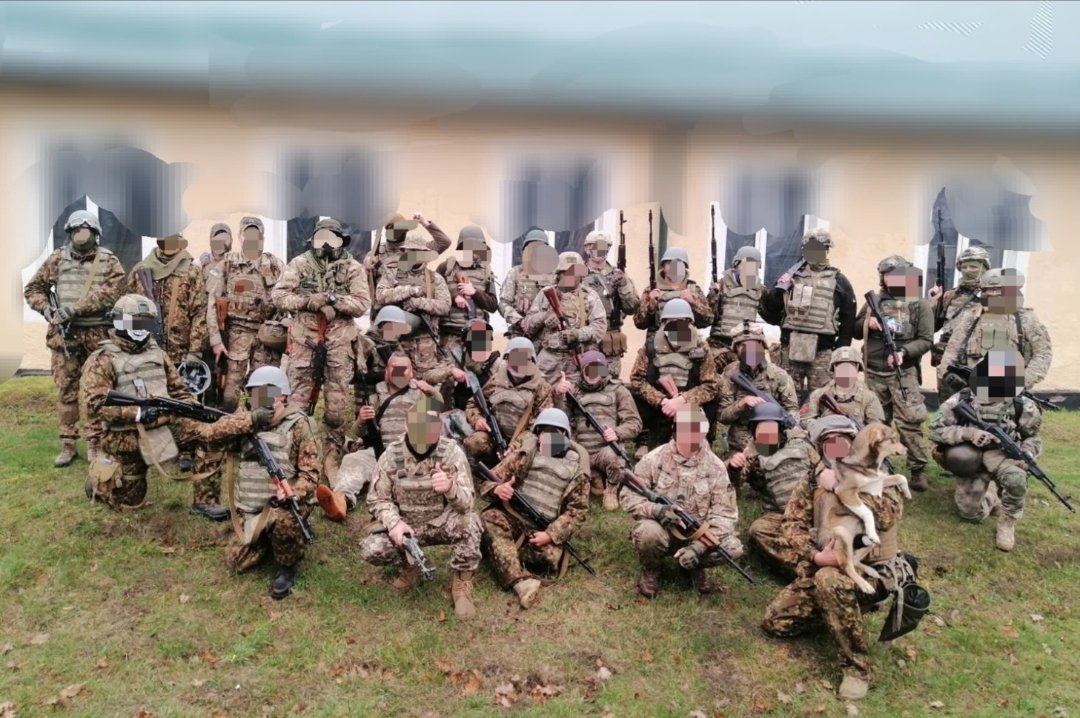
A group from the battalion during training, February 2023

On 30 November 2022, an article by The Kyiv Independent surfaced highlighting and revealing several issues and many problems within the International Legion; notably within the 1st Battalion. The top findings included that multiple legionaires under the battalion claimed that many light weapons, which included Western-provided small arms went missing, suspecting the commanders of misappropriation. Soldiers also claimed that commanders of the battalion threatened them with weapons, bullied and harassed members, and also included allegations of sexual harassment. Other issues such as theft were highlighted, and for soldiers being wrongly kicked out under supposedly "made-up pretexts".

Among the weapons that went missing, according to soldiers participating in checking inventory for the battalion, were up to 54 M4 Carbines made by the United States, several anti-tank weapons including RPGs and NLAWs, grenades, pistols, and a few thousand rounds of ammunition. Bayonets for CZ Bren and SCAR-L rifles also went missing from the Legion armories. It was later alleged by Bohdan, the previous commander of the battalion, that these weapons were transported to one of the training grounds for the formation of a new unit of legionnaires with the permission of the leadership.

Many legionaires filed complaints against various individuals such as Bakaliuk and Bohdan, Bakaliuk being in control of the legions armory at the time of the weapons going missing. However, many fighters of the International Legion, notably 1st Battalion, saw no reaction to the multiple complaints that they had filed against particular commanders who they accused of misconduct.

An interview of a soldier from the 1st Battalion by the name of Joseph MacDonald surfaced in late 2022, with MacDonald revealing several issues with the religion once again. MacDonald highlighted incidents of theft being commonplace, and highlighted misconduct by Bohdan himself.

=== Insignia and nickname ===
Following the creation of the battalion, the unit adopted an insignia which reflected its nickname and battalion designation. The original insignia featured a shield divided into two which represented the Ukrainian flag. The top of the insignia displayed the nickname of the battalion in yellow text - being "Vovkodav", below this were the inscriptions "International Legion" and "1st Battalion", the latter being in an abbreviated form. The nickname, according to a Swiss soldier who served in the battalion, "Vovkodav" meant 'Wolf Fighter', being a Viking Warrior. The symbol represented courage and fierceness in battle as well as the Viking roots of the Ukrainian people. The insignia also had a subdued version to hide the primary color elements of the insignia to make it less distinguishable and visible.

In August 2022, the battalions insignia appeared to have changed with its social media accounts utilising a new insignia and receiving a new designation of an Infantry battalion. The insignia underwent significant changes, discarding the previous nickname "Vovkodav" as well as its associated symbolism of a wolf fighter. The shield was vertically divided, with the left half in red and the right half in green. Moreover, new insignia featured a yellow Spartan helmet and a sword piercing the center of it. Other variations of the insignia with a tab above the shield exist, with the inscription "International Legion" inside of the tab, being more common.

A final change was made to the insignia in approximately November 2022, with the colors in the shield changing to a subdued grey colour instead of a green, and a yellow colour matching the spartan helmet replacing the red. This insignia is still currently in use, with older variants periodically still being used.

==== Visual insignia ====
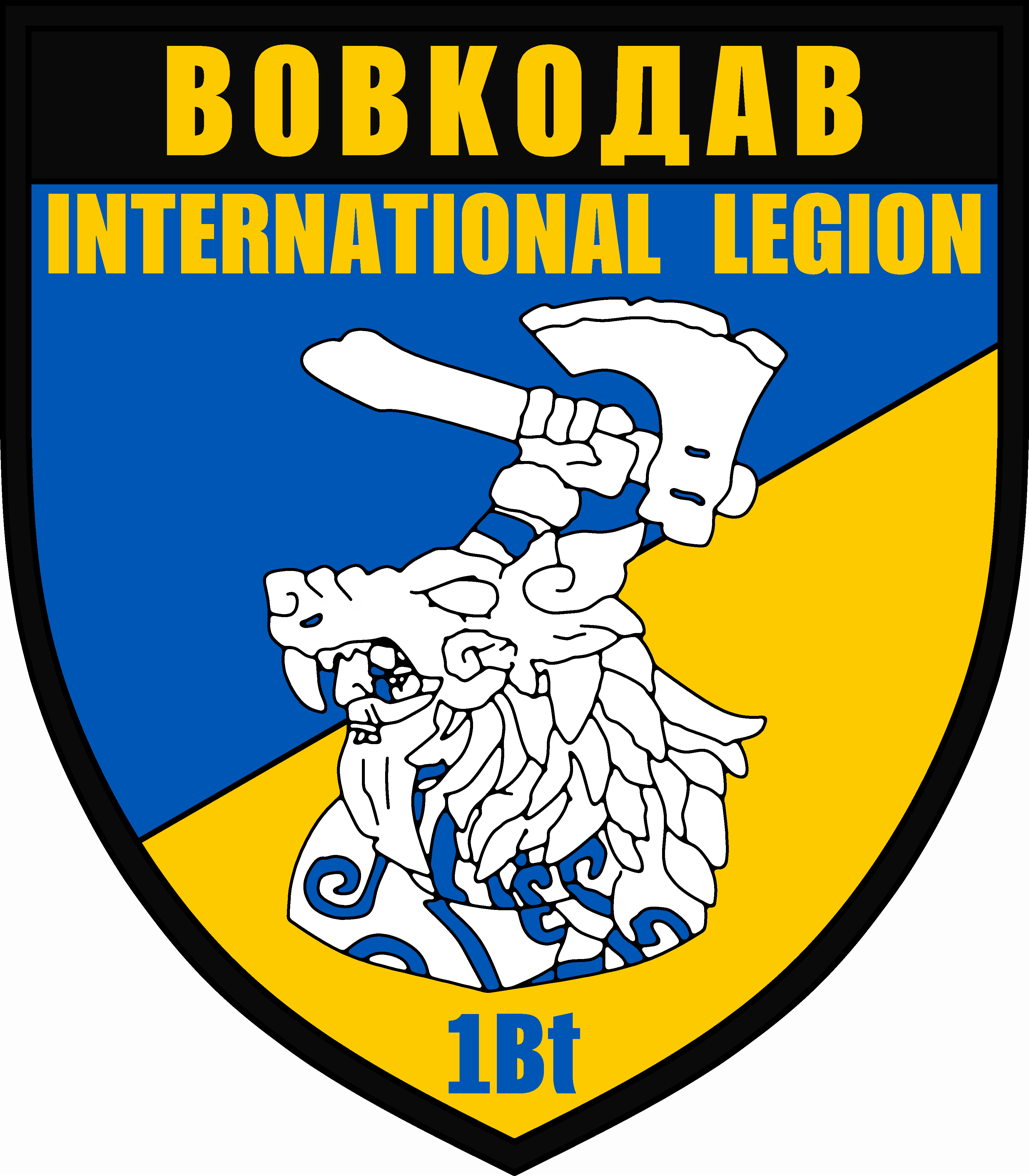
Former shoulder sleeve insignia of the 1st Battalion "Vovkodav".

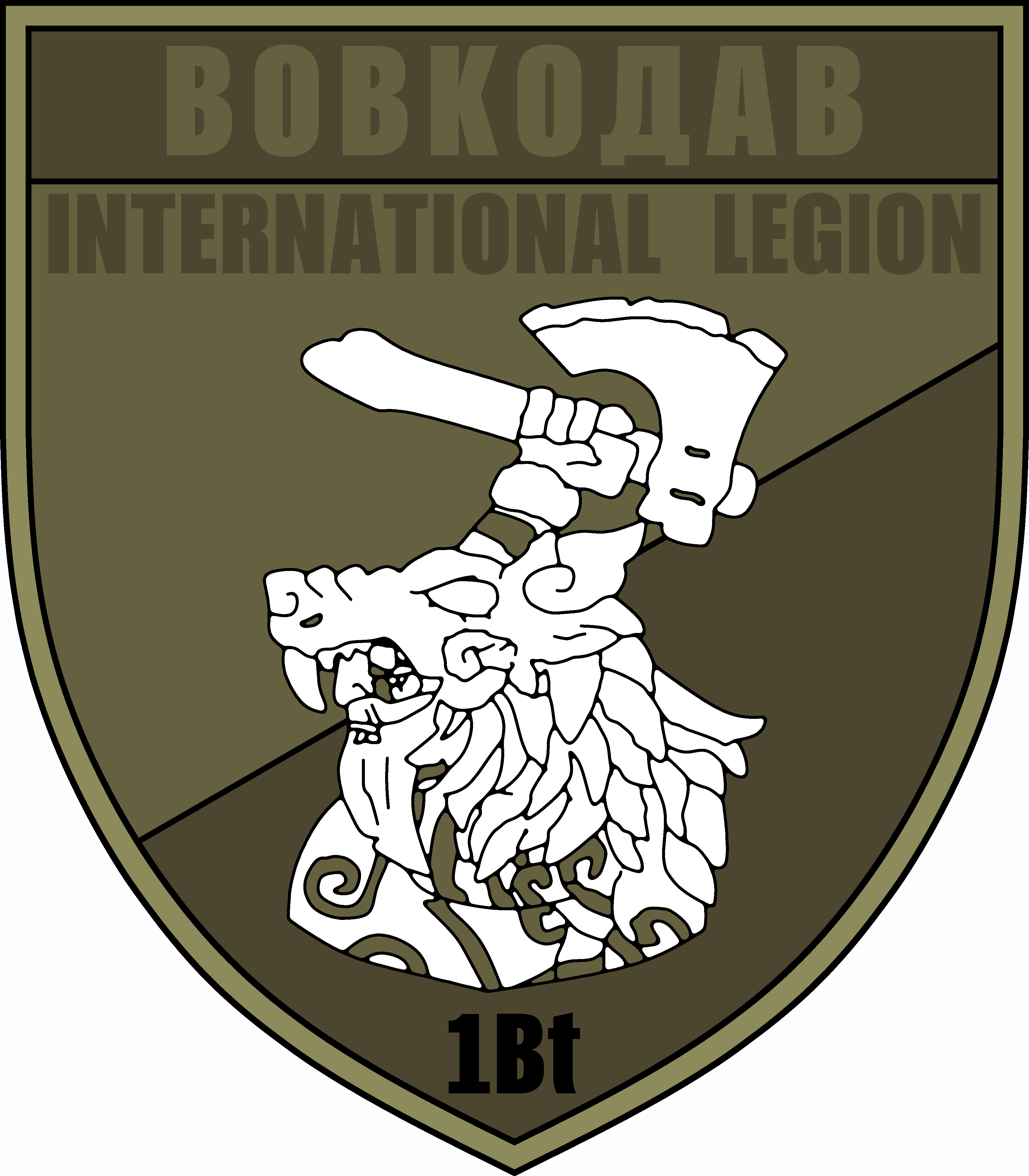
Former shoulder sleeve insignia, subdued variant, of the 1st Battalion "Vovkodav".

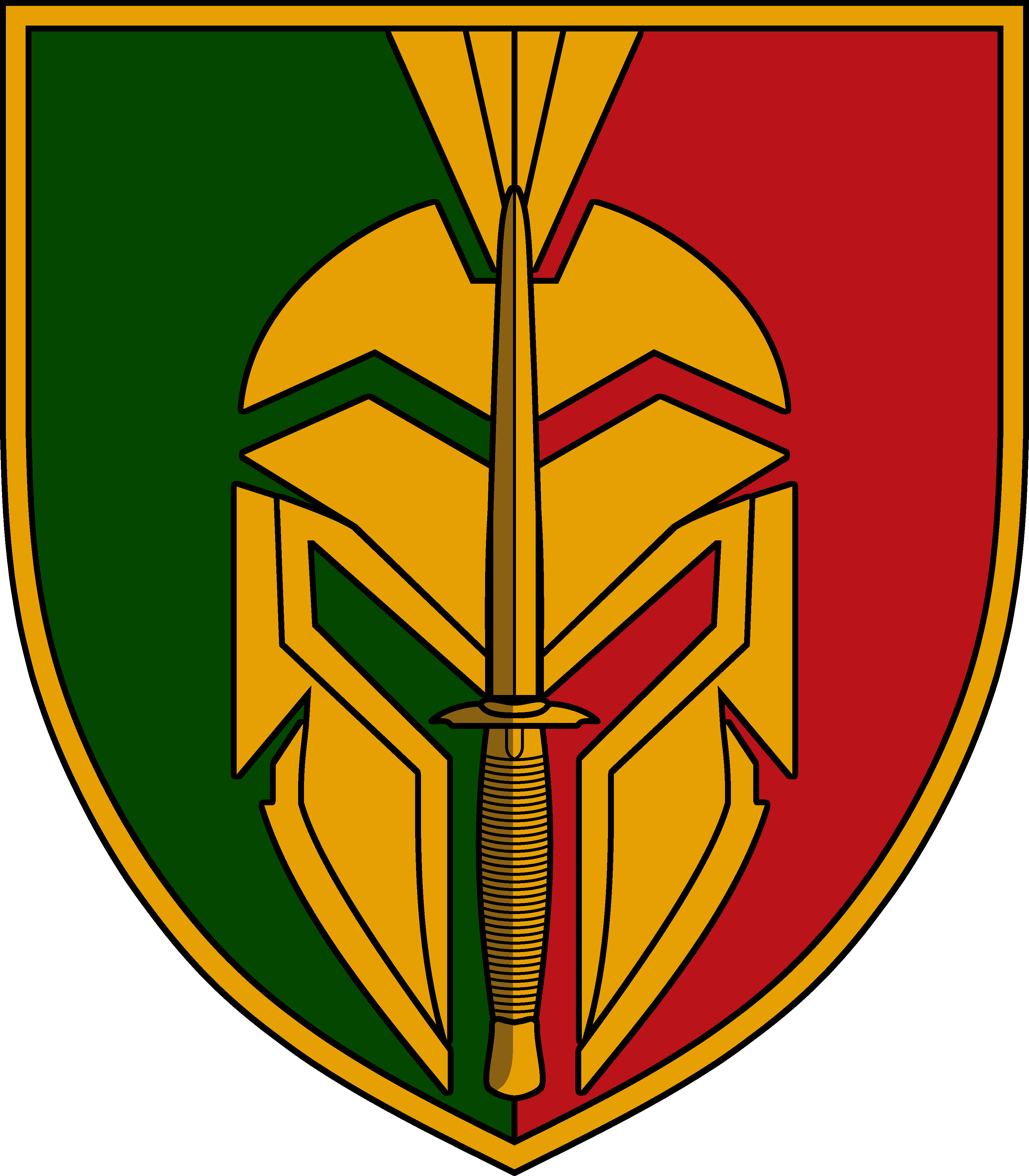
Former shoulder sleeve insignia of the 1st Infantry Battalion.

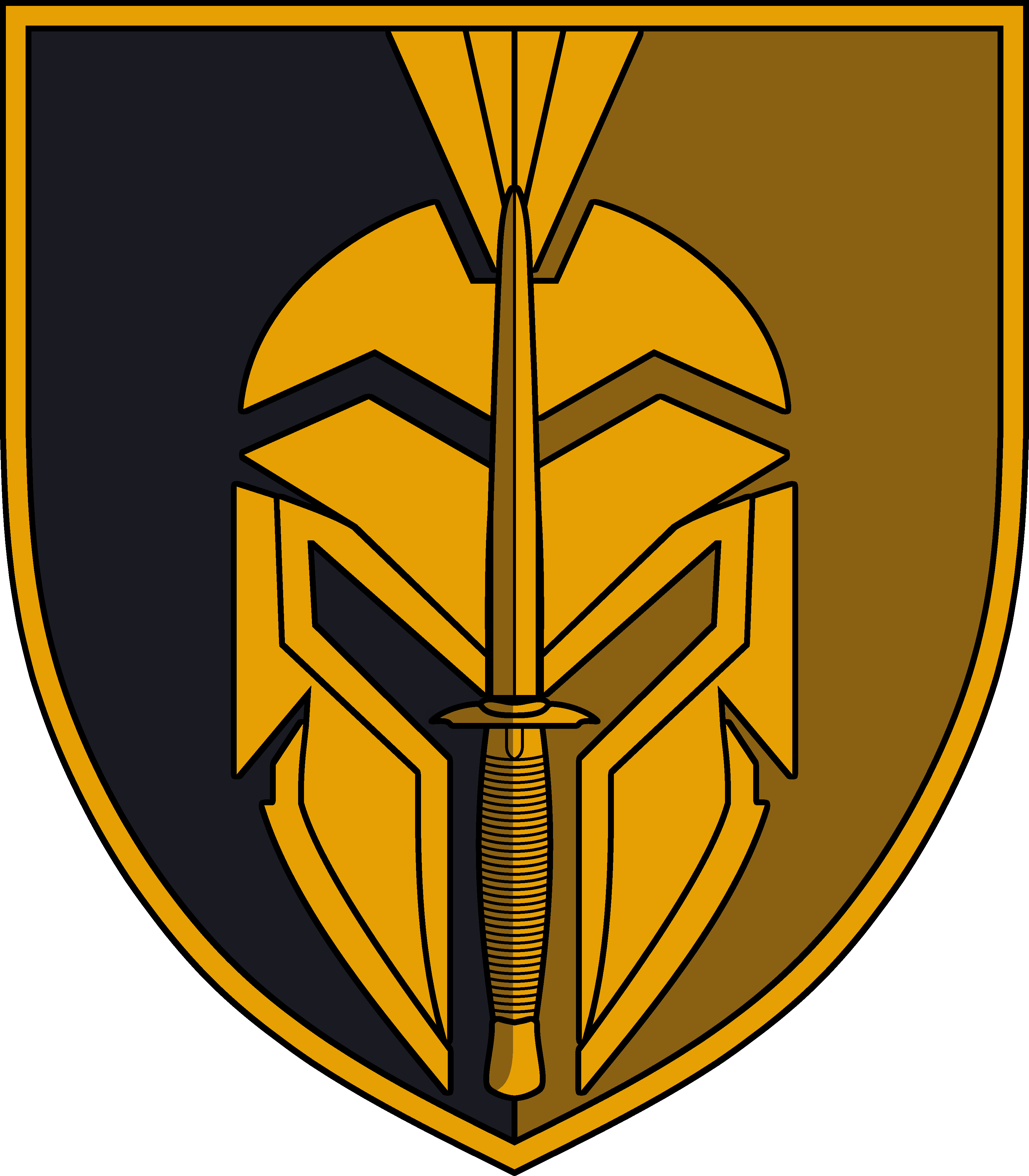
Current shoulder sleeve insignia of the 1st Infantry Battalion.

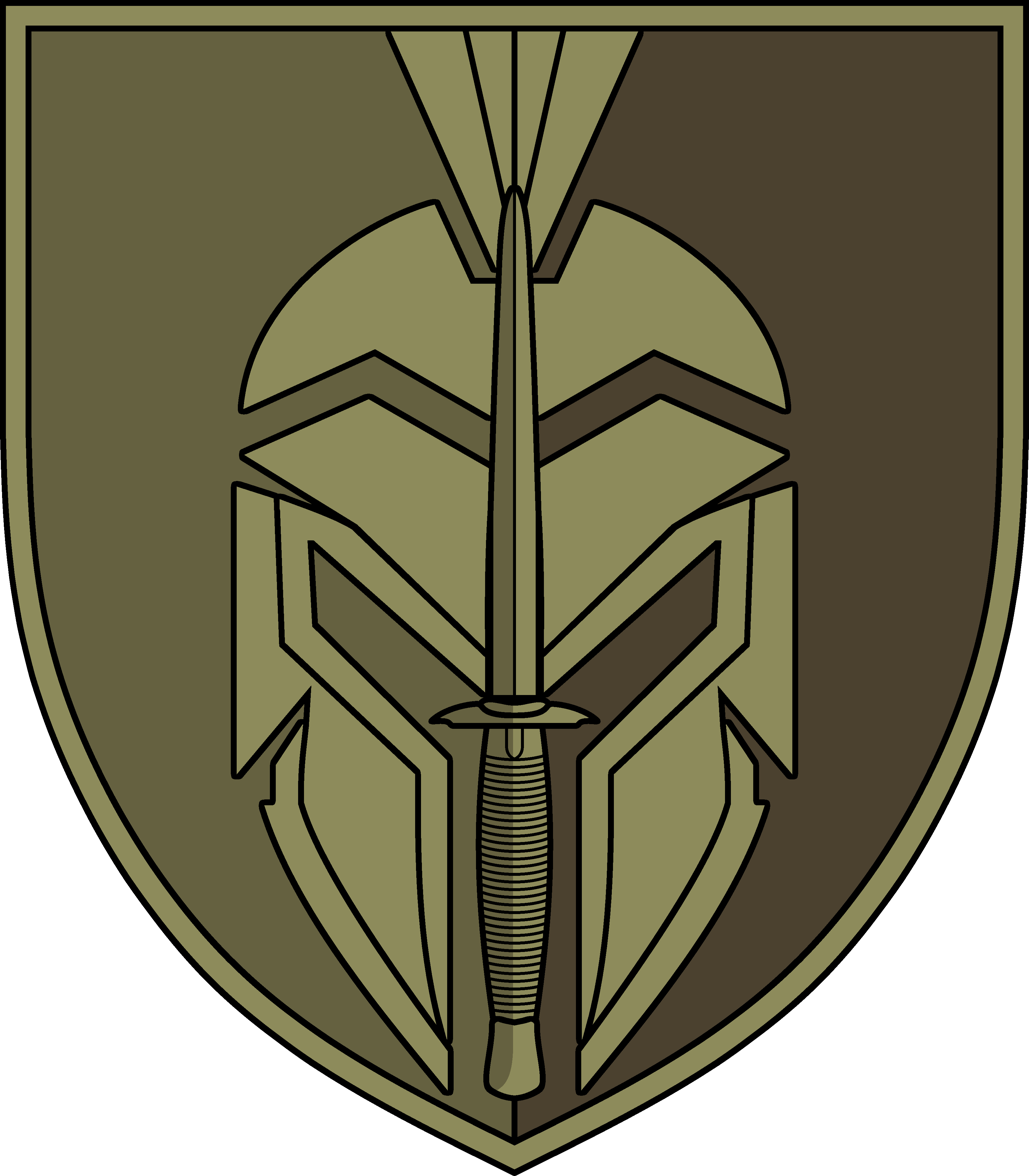
Current shoulder sleeve insignia, subdued variant, of the 1st Infantry Battalion.

=== Disbandment ===
In late 2025, the Ukrainian General Staff reported that battalion was going to be disbanded on 31 December 2025, with personnel of the battalion being transferred into a unit of assault troops. Members of the battalion described the decision by the Ukrainian General Staff as " fracture" and "dissolving." On 9 December 2025, Ukrainska Pravda reported that personnel of the 1st Battalion were transferred to 475th Assault Regiment.

== Equipment ==
=== Small arms ===
The battalion use a small variety of weapons, predominantly a fusion of Soviet/Russian weapons alongside Western weapons. Much like other battalions, the unit utilises variants of the Kalashnikov rifle series; such as the AK-74 and the AK-74M. The unit seems to be equipped with more modernized variants of the Kalashnikov rifle, as opposed to the 2nd Battalion which utilises other rifles such as the FN FAL and the AKM.

Other rifles from Western support such as the M4 Carbine, SCAR-L and the CZ BREN have also been in service. Some of these weapons went missing according to several legionaires.

As of July 2024, the brigade utilizes the following small arms:

- AK-74 - Soviet/Russian assault rifle
- AK-74M - Russian assault rifle
- CZ BREN - Czech assault rifle
- M4 Carbine - American assault rifle
- SCAR-L - Belgian assault rifle

== Russo-Ukrainian war ==
=== Russian invasion of Ukraine ===
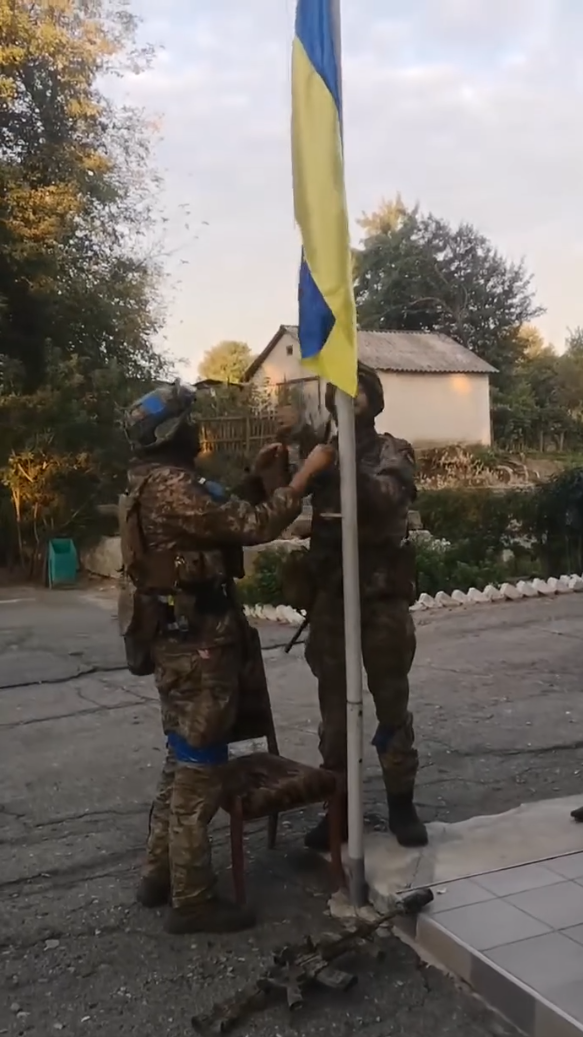
The battalion retaking Kupiansk, 11 September 2022.

The battalion has fought through some of the most crucial campaigns and battles throughout the Russian invasion of Ukraine.

==== 2022 Kharkiv counteroffensive ====
On 6 September 2022, a major counteroffensive by Ukrainian forces commenced in the Kharkiv Oblast. During the offensive, Ukraine retook over 500 settlements and 12,000 square kilometers of territory in the Kharkiv region. This offensive followed the launch of the Kherson counteroffensive in late August and displaced Russian troops across the entire of eastern Ukraine. Bravo Company of the 1st Battalion participated heavily in the battles surrounding Kupiansk, especially in the village of Petropavlivka. The village was said to be a strategically important logistic hub of Kupiansk.

On 11 September 2022, the official page of the International Legion published footage of the 1st Battalion raising the Ukrainian flag in Kupiansk during the Kharkiv counteroffensive - demonstrating the success of the unit in combat actions. Ensuing the retaking of Petropavlivka, the battalion and the Legion pushed east. When the frontline was established east of the Oskil river, the legionnaires switched to defending the new positions.

==== Battle of Bakhmut ====
In March and April 2023, during the Battle of Bakhmut with Ukrainian forces rapidly losing ground in the direction of the city, the 3rd Battalion of the Legion alongside several teams including the Kenobi Death Korps, as part of Bravo I Company, from the 1st Battalion participated in the defense of Bakhmut. The International Legion regarded the battle as "one of the most gruelling battles since the beginning of the war". One of the Legionaires mentioned that during the battle, fighting was non-stop with heavy shelling, machine gun fire, and rockets being fired for 24 hours a day. Amidst the heavy fighting, the legionnaires contributed to repelling Russian attacks on the flanks of Bakhmut and securing the remaining supply routes into the besieged city.

== Structure ==
As of July 2024 the battalion's structure is as follows:

- 1st Infantry Battalion International Legion
  - Battalion's Headquarters
    - Alpha Company
      - Alpha I. Peloton Brennos
      - Alpha II. Légion des volontaires Français
      - Alpha III. Fallen Angels
    - Bravo Company "Kenobi's Death Korps"
      - Bravo I
      - Bravo II
      - Bravo III "Wolverines"
      - Bravo IV Fire Support Platoon
      - Bravo Drone Team
        - FPV Team
    - Charlie Company
      - Charlie I
      - Charlie II
      - Charlie III
      - Charlie IV Fire Support Platoon
      - Charlie Drone Team
    - Reconnaissance Platoon
    - Mortar Platoon
    - Unmanned Aerial Vehicle Team
