= Serebryansky Forest =

Botanical reserve in Luhansk Oblast, Ukraine

Serebryansky Reserve Ukrainian: Серебрянський заказник
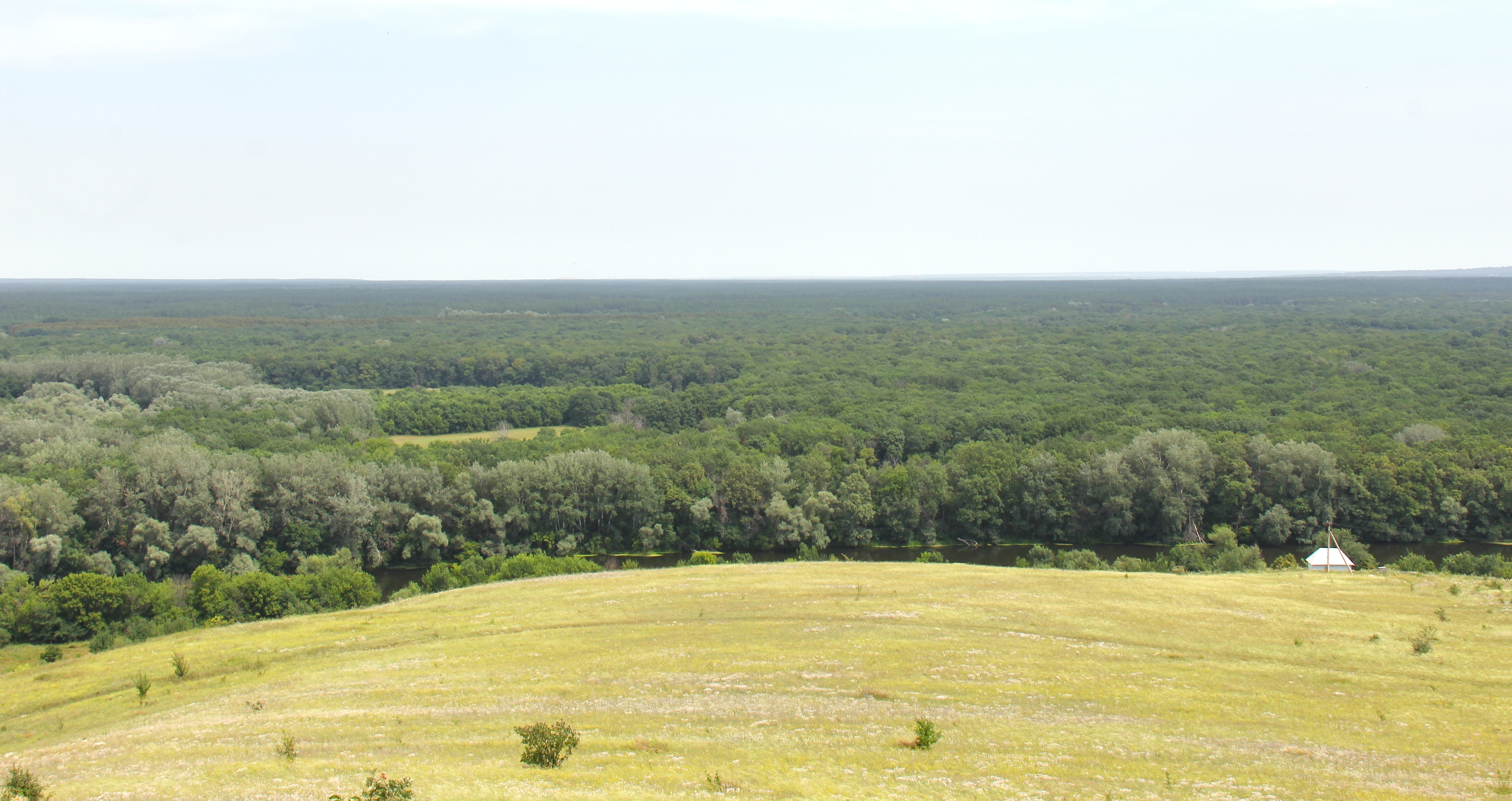
- A photo of the Serebryansky Forest

- Location within Luhansk Oblast Location within Ukraine

Geography
- Location: Kreminna Raion, Luhansk Oblast, Ukraine
- Coordinates: 48°57′18″N 38°08′09″E
- Area: 107.1 hectares (265 acres)

Administration
- Established: 25 December 2001

Ecology
- Ecosystems: Kobilka River, Krasna River

The Serebryansky Forest, officially designated as the Serebryansky Reserve, and commonly known in English as the Kreminna Forest, is a natural reserve in Luhansk Oblast of the Donbas in Eastern Ukraine, along the Siverskyi Donets river.

== Location ==
The forest is located about 8 kilometres (5.0 mi) southwest of Kreminna in Luhansk Oblast. It is on the left bank of the Siverskyi Donets river, and the western and southern edges of the forest mark the border between Luhansk Oblast and the Donetsk Oblast to its west.

== History ==
On 25 December 2001, the Luhansk Oblast Council declared the forest to become a natural reserve.

Since the Russian invasion of Ukraine in February 2022, the forest has been situated on the front line for a long time. Therefore, the natural ecosystems have been severely damaged as a result of heavy fighting in the area.

On August 5, 2025, Russian forces and fighters from the Donetsk and Luhansk regions launched a renewed offensive in the forest, which once more became a major battleground after years of 'meat-grinder' warfare involving 16,500 rows of trenches and both sides capturing and losing ground. On September 15, 2025, Russian forces already controlled more than 75 percent of the forest, but the offensive continued until December, 2025, when it was confirmed that the Russians had completely conquered the forest after three years of battle.

== Characteristics ==
The Serebryansky Reserve covers a total area of 107.1 hectares (265 acres). Though it mainly consists of forestry, it also has other terrains such as swamps and meadows.

=== Flora and Fauna ===
The reserve is a center of boreal ecosystems in the area, which includes many plants that are rare in Luhansk Oblast.

For fauna, the natural reserve has many species, including the European tree frog and the Common slow worm.
