= 3rd Battalion International Legion =

International Legion unit

3rd Separate Special Purpose Battalion, International Legion
- 3-ій окремий батальйон спеціального призначення інтернаціонального легіону
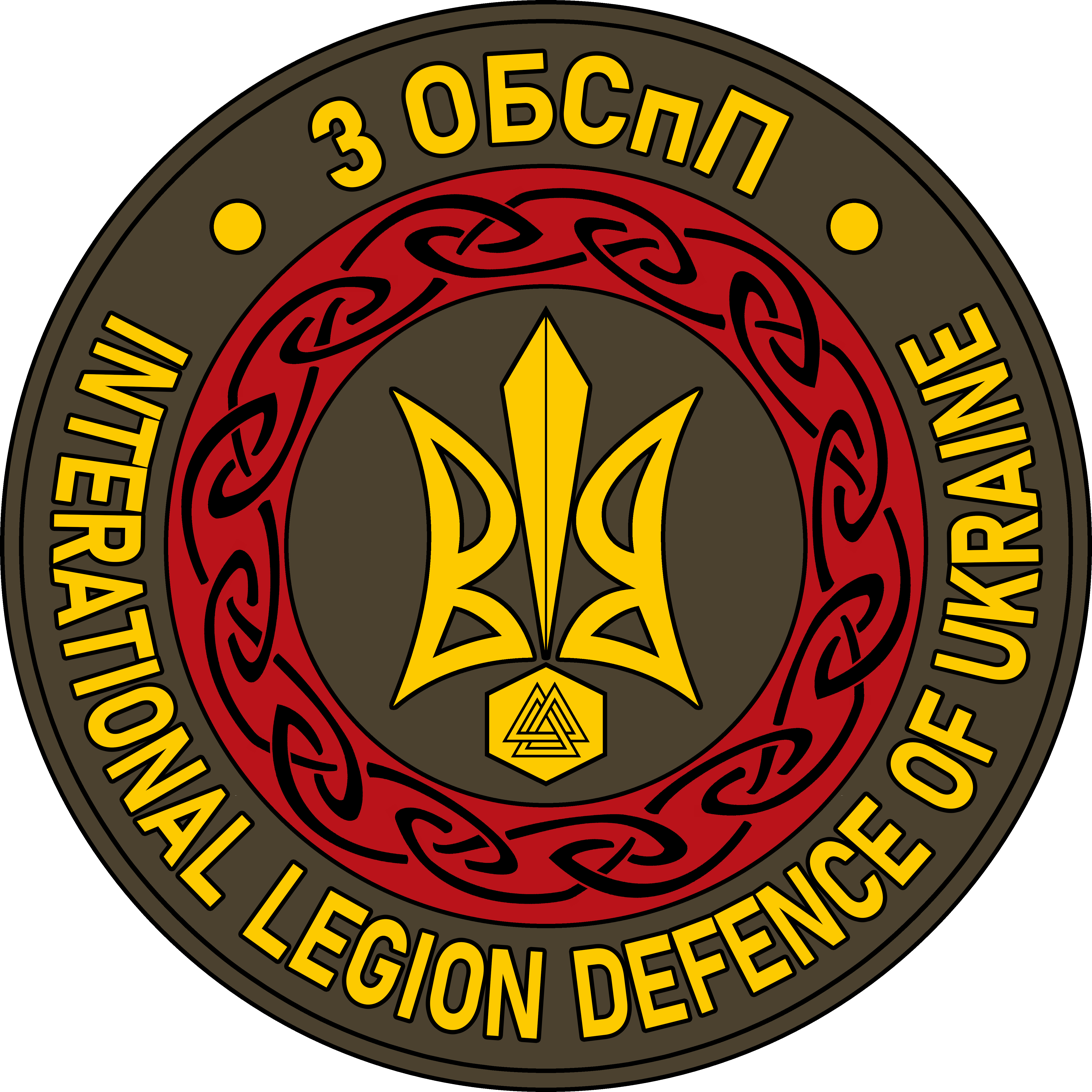
- Shoulder sleeve insignia
- Active: May 2022 – December 2025
- Country: Ukraine
- Branch: Armed Forces of Ukraine
- Type: Spetsnaz
- Role: Special operations
- Size: 500 (Estimated October 2022)
- Part of: International Legion Defence of Ukraine (May 2022 – late 2023); Ukrainian Ground Forces (late 2023 – present)
- Garrison/HQ: Kharkiv, Kharkiv Oblast
- Mottos: "Fighting for Life" (official), "Only One Way", "We Go First"
- Engagements: Russo-Ukrainian war; Russian invasion of Ukraine; Eastern Ukraine campaign; Battle of Bakhmut; Battle of Chasiv Yar; Defense of Kharkiv/Battle of Lyptsi; Kursk offensive; Defense of Kupiansk 2025; 2023 Ukrainian counteroffensive

Commanders
- Current commander: Anatoly Marchuk (unknown - present)
- Notable commanders: Bohdan (May 2022 - unknown)

Insignia
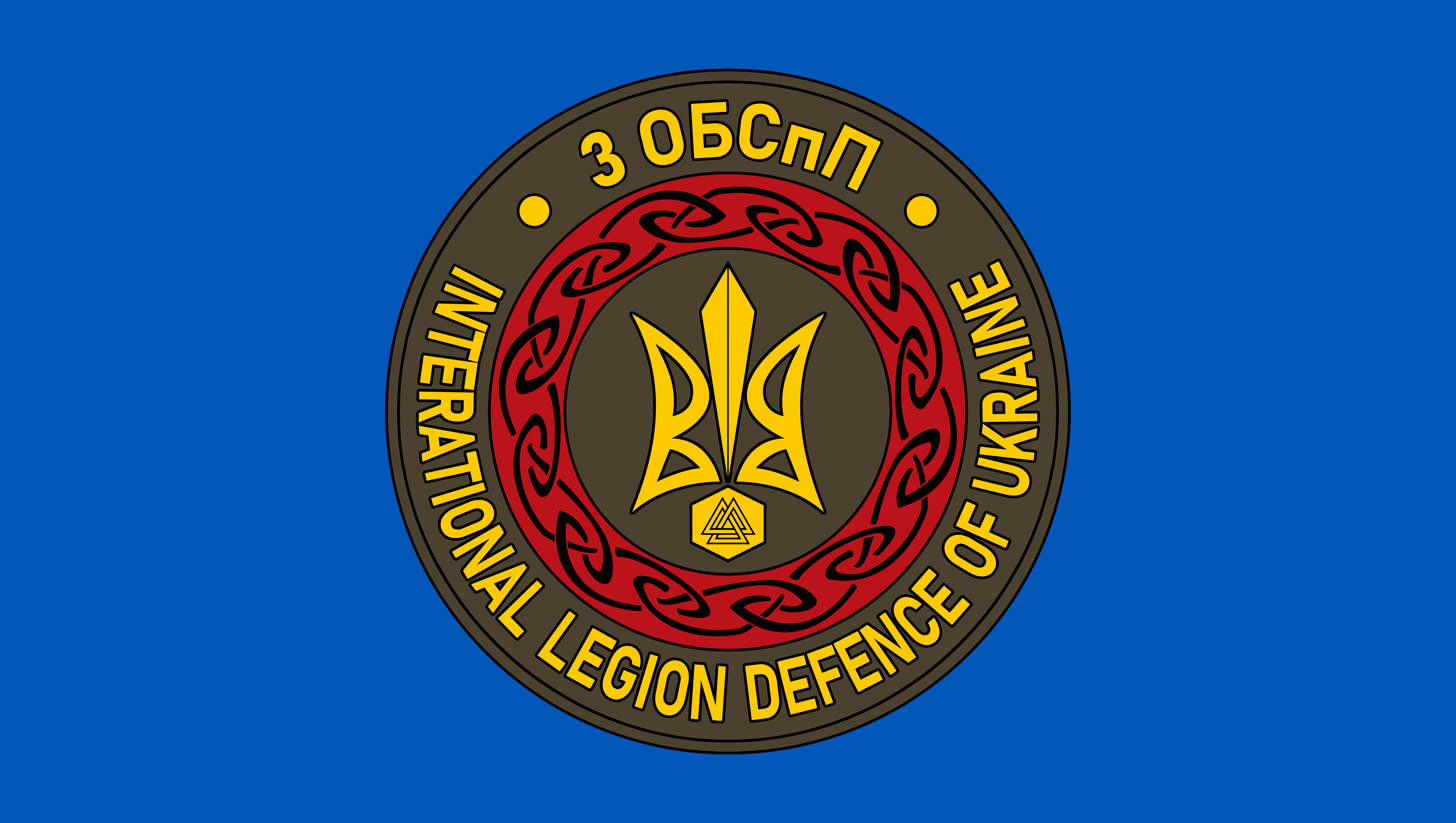
- Flag

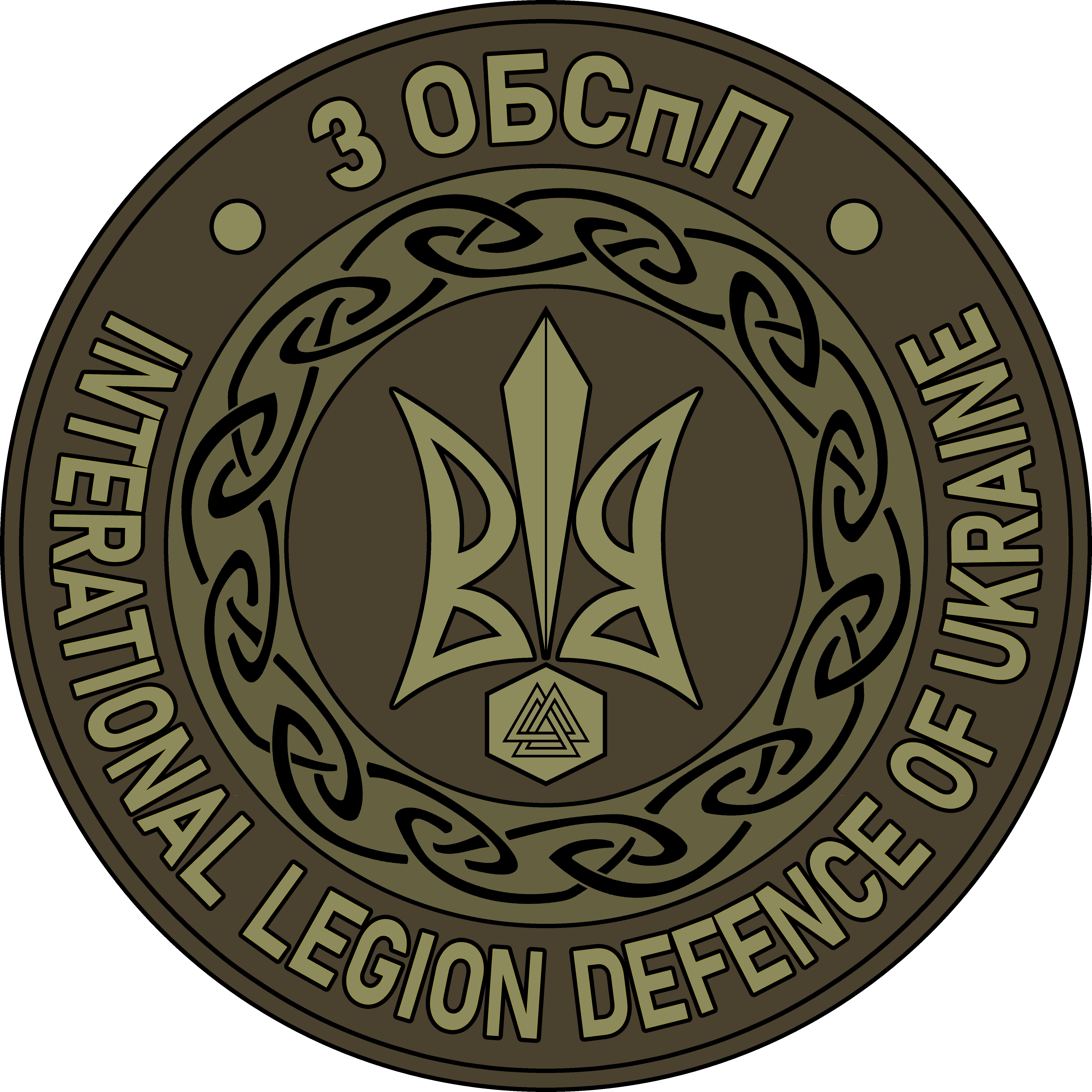
- Field insignia

The 3rd Separate Special Purpose Battalion (Ukrainian: 3-й батальйон спеціального призначення інтернаціонального легіону) (Note: Ukrainian: 3-ій окремий батальйон спеціального призначення iнтернаціонального легіону, romanized: 3-iy okremiy batalyon spetsialnoho priznachennya internatsionalnoho lehionu), also commonly referred to as the 3rd Battalion International Legion or 3rd Legion, was a formation of the Ukrainian Armed Forces that was created in May 2022, functioning as part of the International Legion for the Defence of Ukraine which was itself formed on 27 February 2022. The unit was one of four numbered "battalions" within the structure of the International Legion. The battalion was unique compared to the other numbered battalions in the International Legion due to its designation as a Special Purpose Battalion, a designation more commonly known in English as "spetsnaz" (the term originating from a contraction of "special purpose" in the Russian language).

The 3rd Special Purpose Battalion was primarily specialised in reconnaissance duties and small-scale infantry assaults, with a particular training emphasis on commando operations, close-quarters combat in urban areas, deep reconnaissance, irregular warfare, and other mission tasks that fall under the "spetsnaz" label.

== History ==
=== Formation ===
On 27 February 2022, Ukrainian President Volodymyr Zelenskyy made an announcement declaring the establishment of an international fighting force to assist in defending the sovereignty and independence of Ukraine amidst the Russian invasion. Initially only consisting of 1st Battalion, as numbers grew, the International Legion was forced to expand, resulting in the creation of 2nd Battalion. Eventually, as necessary missions became greater in complexity, the need for a specialised battalion arose, and in May 2022, the 3rd Battalion Special Purpose was established.

It was reported by Grey Dynamics in 2024 that many Latin American volunteers are common in the International Legion, particularly Brazilian and Colombian volunteers which are prominent in the battalion, as well as a notable quantity of others in the 1st and 2nd Battalions of the Legion. According to Suspilne Media, a Ukrainian national public broadcaster, the battalion is composed of citizens from France, the United Kingdom, the United States, Bulgaria, and Russia, as well as many other nationalities.

=== Reforms ===
In May 2022, after multiple allegations of misconduct and corruption-related activities, a Ukrainian military commander by the identity of "Bohdan" was transferred from the command of the 1st Infantry Battalion to a position as the first commander of the 3rd Special Purpose Battalion, coinciding with its creation.

=== Symbols ===
==== Beret and head badge ====
The battalion's beret is dark green and reflect its special purpose designation.

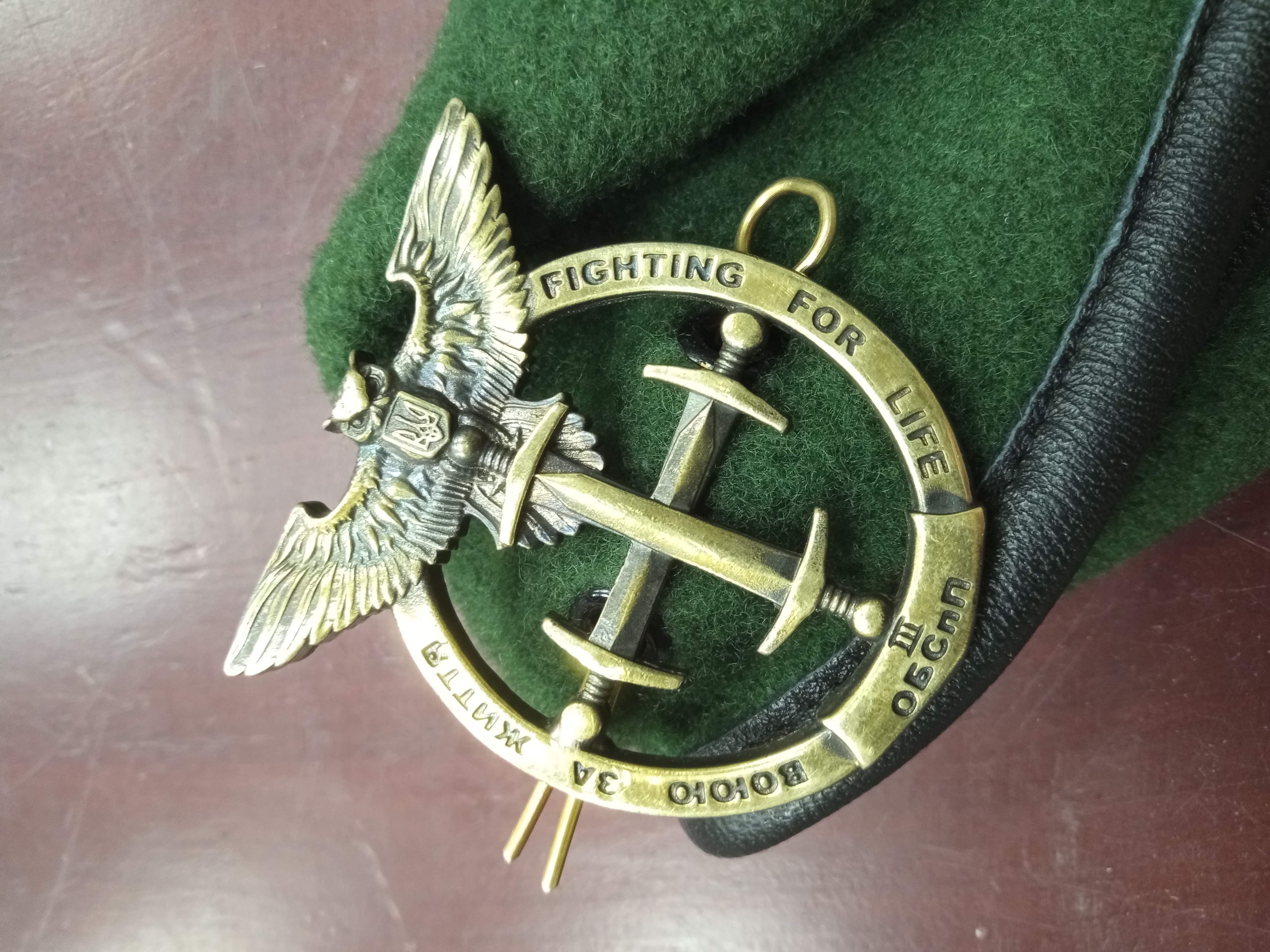
Head Badge of the 3rd Special Purpose Battalion of Ukraine's International Legion

The unit's head badge, also known as "cap badge" or "beret flash", is a single piece of cast brass pinned to the front of the beret. It displays an owl, a nocturnal predator and the symbol of GUR, Ukraine's military intelligence service, despite the battalion not being affiliated to GUR but rather falling under the Ukrainian Armed Forces.

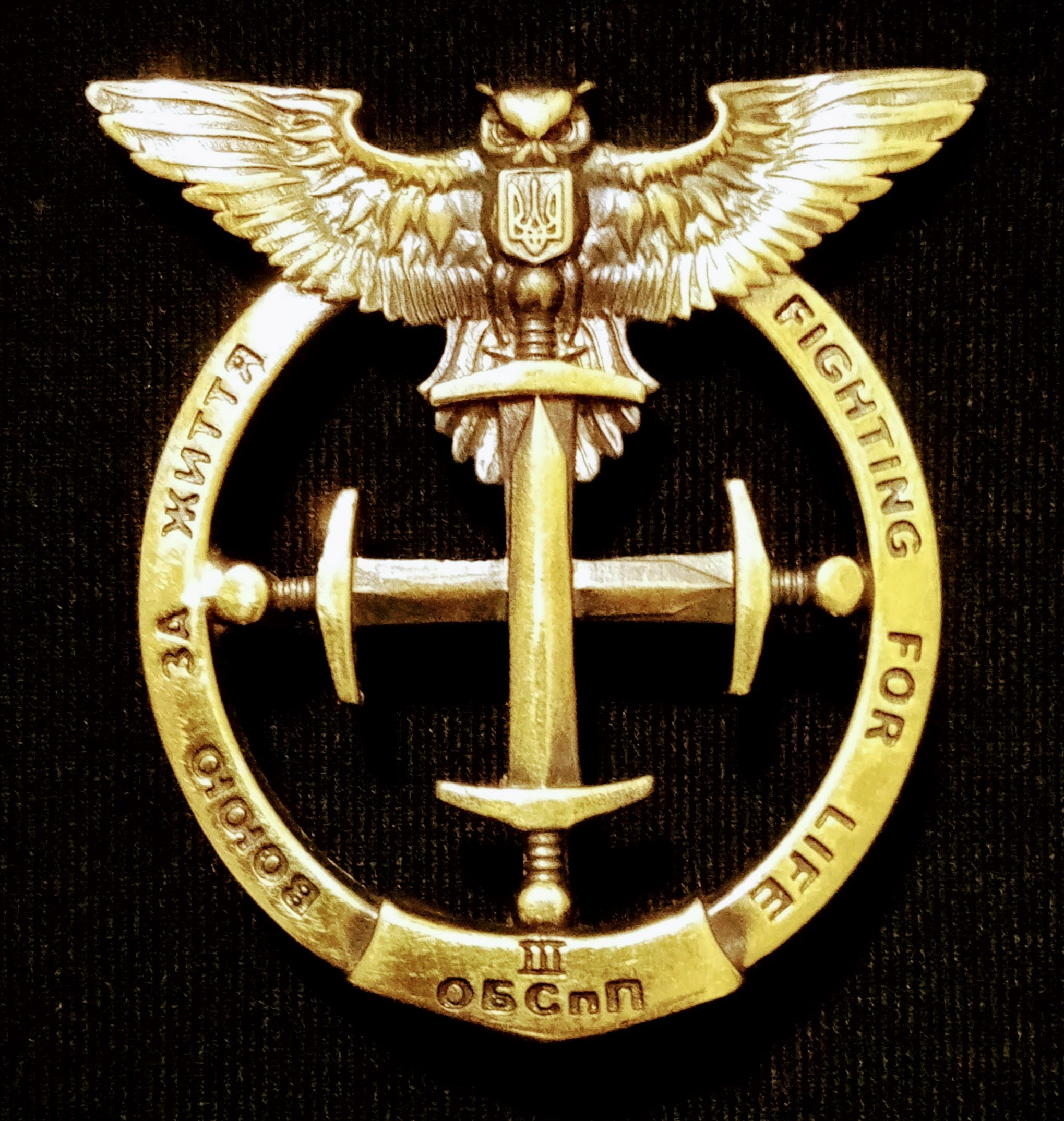
The 3rd Special Purpose Battalion's head badge insignia

A potential explanation is the unit's focus on reconnaissance, the Ukrainian equivalent of which (розвідка - rozvidka), encompasses both reconnaissance and intelligence. The close association between the two concepts in Ukrainian military doctrine, with GUR's owl as its most prominent symbol, may explain the owl on 3rd Battalion's badge.

A Ukrainian trident, or Tryzub (Ukrainian: тризуб), from Ukraine's coat of arms, is visible on the owl's chest. The four overlapped swords symbolize the contributions of legionnaires from all over the world. The battalion's official moto, "Fighting for Life" is displayed in Ukrainian and English on the left and right sides of the badge, while the unit's abbreviated designation "III-ОБСпП" is visible at the bottom.

==== Flag and field insignia ====
The battalions' insignia is displayed in the shape of a circle with the acronym of the battalion designation depicted at the top, as well as 'International Legion Defence of Ukraine' being displayed across the bottom of the insignia. Around the centre of the insignia is a circular stripe with a Nordic-style braid pattern being visible, and in the center of the insignia is a Ukrainian Tryzub symbol in the shape of a sword. At the bottom of the tryzub is a valknut symbol displayed, also of Nordic origin.

== Russo-Ukrainian war ==
=== Russian invasion of Ukraine ===
==== Kharkiv counteroffensive ====
The 3rd Battalion, attached to Ukraine's 92nd Mechanized Infantry Brigade, participated in the Kharkiv counteroffensive in September and October 2022, pushing Russian forces back to and passed the boundary of Luhansk Oblast. In mid-October, teams from the battalion reached Stel'makhivka town and the outskirts of Novoselivske, where they encountered fierce resistance.

==== Kupyansk front ====
In November 2022, one of the battalion's teams captured and safely brought back a Russian officer while on a reconnaissance mission in the Kupyansk sector.

==== Battle for Novoselivske ====
In January 2023, the 3rd Battalion took part in the brigade-level counteroffensive to retake the town of Novoselivske, Luhansk Oblast, which had fallen back to the Russians after having been freed earlier. Two teams from the Battalion, Team Commando and Team Omega, played an integral role in the success of this operation, tasked by 92nd Brigade command to push through the Russian forces defending the village and seize two key Russian positions further East: the north-east and south-east corners of the town. In a second phase, Commando and Omega were to hold these positions against Russian reinforcements, in order to allow Ukrainian infantry to clear the village behind them. The participating two teams from 3rd Battalion jointly operated with small detachments of 92nd Brigade’s rozvidka (reconnaissance).

Although suffering significant casualties from mortars, AGS, cluster munitions and tank fire during the assault phase, and later taking proximity fire from multiple T-90 tanks and bomber drones during the holding phase, the two joint teams successfully captured the assigned positions and held them for upwards of 24h through the night and next day, eventually relieved by Ukrainian troops on January 14th.

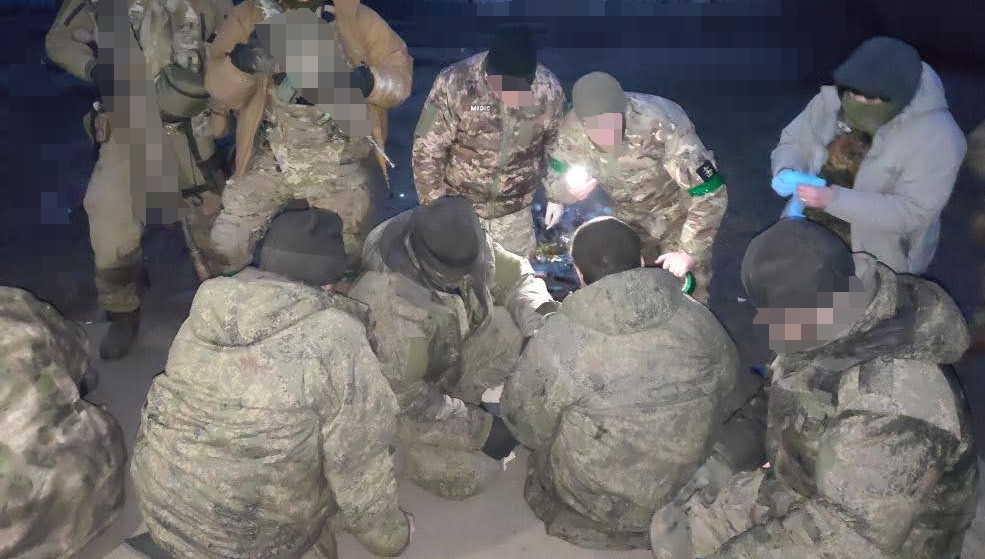
3rd Battalion Legionnaires standing behind Russian prisoners receiving medical treatment, 13 January 2023

As part of this offensive, the 3rd Battalion brought back 6 Russian prisoners alive, which were later featured in online articles. They can be seen receiving medical treatment by medics from the 92nd Brigade. Two legionnaires from 3rd Battalion are standing behind the Russian prisoners, top left corner. The letters "medic" are visible on the uniform of the man in the center.

Novoselivske, although returned to Ukrainian control, had been completely destroyed in the weeks prior, and empty for days with the last resident reportedly shot by a Russian sniper the first week of January.

==== Battle of Bakhmut ====
In March and April 2023, during the Battle of Bakhmut, Ukrainian forces were rapidly losing ground in the direction of the city of Bakhmut. 3rd Battalion International Legion, alongside several teams from 1st Battalion (including the Kenobi Death Korps, a part of Bravo I Company 1st Battalion) participated in the defense of Bakhmut. The International Legion has described the battle on their website as "one of the most gruelling battles since the beginning of the war". One of the legionnaires described that throughout the battle, fighting was non-stop, with continuous shelling, machine gun fire, and rockets often ongoing for all 24 hours in a day. Amidst the heavy fighting, the legionnaires contributed to repelling Russian attacks on the flanks of Bakhmut and securing the remaining supply routes into the besieged city.

In July 2023, it was reported by the International Legion that a team from the battalion had captured a Russian soldier while assaulting Russian positions in eastern Ukraine.

==== 2023 Ukrainian counteroffensive ====
On 29 August 2023, Malcolm Nance, a member of the battalion, stated publicly that the battalion was deployed to the Donbas front during the Ukrainian summer counteroffensive and required vehicles including Steyr-Puch Pinzgauer Armored Personnel Carriers, armored Land Rover Defender trucks, and Polaris ATVs.

=== Disbandment ===
In December 2025, the Battalion was disbanded. Personnel of the 3rd Battalion were transferred to the 475th Assault Regiment alongside personnel of the 1st Battalion.

== Notable members ==
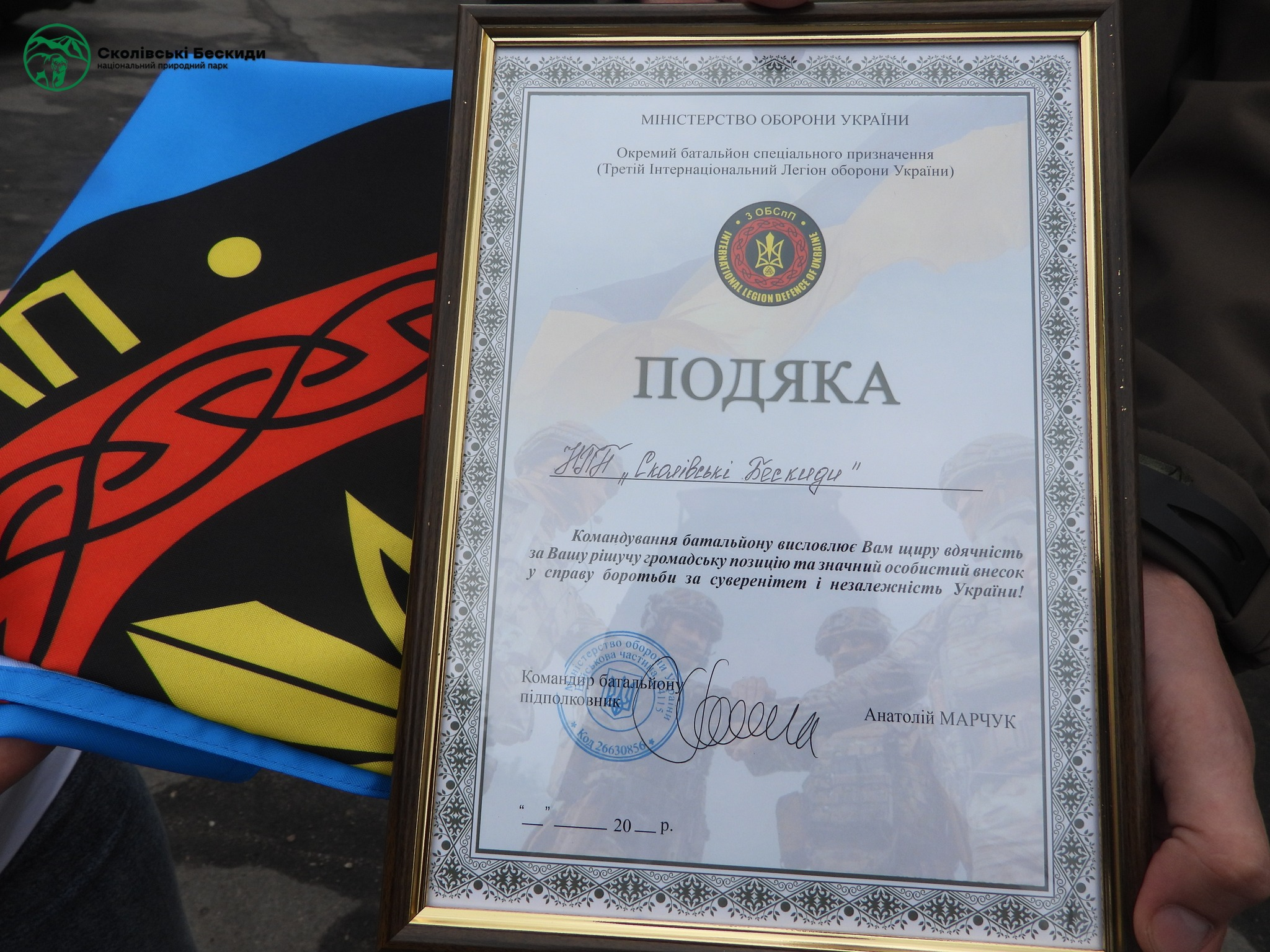
Battalion commander Anatoly Marchuk giving a plaque to the Skolivski Beskydy National Park, expressing gratitude for off-road vehicles being donated to the unit.

=== Malcolm Nance ===
Malcolm Nance, a former United States Navy officer and former MSNBC news reporter, was known to be a member of the battalion since he volunteered to join the International Legion. He has since helped in raising funds for the battalion.

== Structure ==
As of 2023, the battalion structure is as follows:

- 3rd Special Purpose Battalion International Legion
  - Battalion Headquarters
    - Team "Ghost"
    - Team "Omega"
    - Team "Ranger"
    - Team "Commando"
    - Group "Turan"
    - Team Jedi 2024
    - Snake Team 2024
    - Lucky strike
