= Foreign fighters in the Russo-Ukrainian war =

The Russo-Ukrainian war has seen foreign volunteers participate on both sides of the conflict. Most foreign fighters joined the conflict during one of two waves. The first wave happened from 2014 to 2019 during the war in Donbas and consisted of approximately 17,241 foreign fighters. (Note: Numbers for foreign fighters between 2014 and 2019 are according to a study by Arkadiusz Legieć, a Senior Analyst at the Polish Institute of International Affairs.) The second wave is considered by researchers to have been much larger and began in 2022 after the Russian invasion of Ukraine. The invasion saw people of various nationalities enlist, with Ukraine forming a foreign legion and Russia recruiting mercenaries.

== Background ==
The Russo-Ukraine War has seen two distinct waves of foreign fighters: the 2014 wave to join Ukrainian volunteer battalions and pro-Russia separatist groups during the war in Donbas phase and the post-Russian Invasion of Ukraine wave starting in 2022.

=== War in the Donbas ===
The foreign fighter movement in 2014 was largely short-lived, with researcher Kacper Rekawek writing, "fighters arrived throughout the summer of 2014, and most of them were gone from Ukraine at some point in 2015, although some returned later, with a small group settling in Ukraine permanently." By the end of 2015, Rekawek notes, "both sides took steps to professionalise their forces and incorporate the bottom-up organised volunteer battalions into e.g. the Ukrainian National Guard or, in the case of the 'separatists,' into the 'army corps.' This effectively meant an end to foreign fighter recruitment for this conflict and very few (new) foreigners joined either side after the end of 2015."

An analysis of foreign fighters by Arkadiusz Legieć, a Senior Analyst at the Polish Institute of International Affairs, estimated that about 17,241 foreign fighters fought in Ukraine between 2014 and 2019. 3,879 of those foreign fighters supported Ukraine and joined foreign volunteer battalions. The largest group of foreign fighters in Ukraine was approximately 3,000 Russian citizen volunteers. The second-largest group consisted of approximately 300 Belarusians. The third-largest group consisted of approximately 120 Georgians. The only other country to exceed 50 foreign fighters was Croatia, with approximately 60 fighters. Other countries whose nationals supported Ukraine included Albania (15), Australia (5), Austria (35), Azerbaijan (20), Belgium (1), Bosnia and Herzegovina (5), Bulgaria (6), Canada (10), Czech Republic (5), Denmark (15), Estonia (10), Finland (15), France (15), Germany (15), Greece (2), Ireland (7), Israel (15), Italy (35), Latvia (8), Lithuania (15), Moldova (15), Kosovo (4), Netherlands (3), North Macedonia (4), Norway (10), Poland (10), Portugal (1), Romania (4), Serbia (6), Slovakia (8), Sweden (25), Turkey (30), the United Kingdom (10), and the United States (15).

=== Russian invasion of Ukraine ===
The launch of the Russian invasion of Ukraine in February 2022 caused a significant increase in the number of foreign fighters in the conflict. The Ukrainian government announced the establishment of an officially-sanctioned foreign legion two days after it began, which had received alleged endorsement from some Western governments after ambiguous statements from officials. The Georgian Legion and Belarusian Kastuś Kalinoŭski Regiment are one of the largest such units on the Ukrainian side.

Russian president Vladimir Putin publicly welcomed fighters from abroad to join his forces. Most foreigners arriving to fight for Russia are enlisted in the Prizrak Brigade.

== Russian side ==
=== Post-Soviet countries ===
A significant number of foreign fighters from the former Soviet Union have fought in Russo-Ukrainian War for the pro-Russian side. These have included fighters from Armenia, Belarus, Kazakhstan, Kyrgyzstan, and Latvia, as well as from pro-Russian breakaway regions such as Abkhazia, South Ossetia, and Transnistria.

In November 2026, relatives of a 59-year-old Latvian pro-Russian activist who moved to Russia in 2024 said he had been tricked into signing a contract to fight for Russia in Ukraine while being held in custody over fraud charges. According to his lawyers, he never underwent a military medical examination and their requests for this were not answered. The Telegram channel Ostorozhno, Novosti reported that his condition and whereabouts had also become unknown.

==== Russian Federation ====
Prior to its open involvement in 2022, especially during the first peak of the war in Donbas between 2014 and 2015, Russia had previously tried to deny any formal intervention in Ukraine and portrayed Russian forces in the country as either part of local forces or Russian citizens voluntarily fighting in the country. These units have been referred as "little green men" by Western and Ukrainian media and as "polite people" by Russian media. The Russian government-supported private military company Wagner Group, largely composed of former Soviet, Eastern European and Syrian soldiers, is deployed in Ukraine to secure Russian interests while maintaining the deniability of formal Russian involvement.

Outside of Russian forces which have been described as volunteers or unrelated to the Russian government to maintain deniability, various Russian individuals and groups have joined separatist forces in Donbas. These have included Cossacks, the pro-Putin National Liberation Movement, the neo-Nazi Russian National Unity, the National Bolshevik Other Russia party, and left-wing activists. Non-Slavic ethnic minorities have been among the foreign fighters, including North Ossetians, Ingush, and Chechens.

=== Fighters from other countries ===
Most foreign fighters from countries outside the former Soviet Union are from Europe. According to a report by Polish security expert Kacper Rękawek for the Polish Institute of International Affairs published in 2015, around a hundred Germans, a hundred Serbs, and thirty Hungarians were fighting for pro-Russian forces in Donbas.

In January 2026, Dmitry Usov, the head of the Ukrainian prisoner of war headquarters, said that 18,000 foreigners from 128 countries and territories have been recruited to serve in the Russian military, excluding North Korean troops.

==== Nepali and Indian foreign fighters ====
In December 2023, the government of Nepal revealed that six of its citizens had been killed in Ukraine fighting for Russian forces and urged Russia to stop recruiting young men from the country to fight in its army. Nepal's ambassador to Russia said that around 150-200 Nepali nationals have been fighting for Russia. In early January 2024, Nepal stopped issuing permits for its citizens to work in Russia or Ukraine after 10 of its citizens were killed fighting in Russia's army. The number of Nepalis killed in Ukraine is officially 12 but could be as high as 19.

In addition, Nepali foreign minister Narayan Prakash Saud said that as of December 2023, four Nepali men had been taken prisoner by the Ukrainian army, and about 100 were missing or injured.

A number of Indian nationals were reportedly 'duped' into fighting in Russia's army after being promised other jobs, admissions to "dubious private universities" and "free discounted visa extensions" within Russia, but were instead sent to the front lines. The identities of at least two Indian nationals expecting to work as "helpers" have been confirmed killed fighting at the front in Ukraine. In March 2024, India said it had uncovered a "major human trafficking network" which lured young men to Russia with the promise of jobs only to force them to fight in the war.

As of January 2025, 12 Indian nationals were killed and another 16 missing while fighting for Russia in Ukraine.

==== Chinese foreign fighters ====
On 29 November 2023, Chinese mercenary Zhao Rui was killed in action while fighting for the Russian military in Zaporizhzhia Oblast, becoming the first known Chinese combatant to die in the war.

On 8 April 2025, Ukrainian president Volodymyr Zelenskyy said that Ukrainian troops had captured two Chinese nationals that were fighting in the ranks of the Russian military against Ukraine. According to Zelenskyy, Ukrainian troops had clashed with six Chinese soldiers near the villages Bilohorivka and Tarasivka in Donetsk Oblast. Zelenskyy also said that there are "much more" Chinese citizens in Russian units.

==== Serbian foreign fighters ====
A significant number of Serbian citizens and ethnic Serbs from neighbouring countries such as Bosnia (specifically the autonomous Republika Srpska) and Montenegro have joined to fight for pro-Russian forces in Donbas, having been described by external observers and the DPR/LPR authorities as one of the largest components of foreign fighters. Many of the Serb fighters are veterans of the Yugoslav Wars. Serbian units within the pro-Russian forces include the International Brigade, Seventh Brigade, Serbian-Hussar Regiment, Ural Unit, First Slavic Unit, Batman Unit, Rezanj Unit, and the Jovan Šević Detachment.

Historical links with Russia, pan-Slavism, and religious affinity have been regarded as a major factor in Serbs joining the pro-Russian forces, although many are mercenaries. Many of the fighters identify as Chetniks. In January 2024, Serbian DPR fighter Dejan Berich spoke of abuse of Serbian recruits with Russian paratroopers referring to the Serbs as "gypsies" and sending them on assaults with two or three magazines of ammunition, ordering them to obtain weapons in the battlefield.

Bratislav Živković, a Serbian mercenary and leader of the Chetniks, a Serbian extremist group, was killed in Ukraine in January 2025. In the war, he had organized Serbian mercenaries entering eastern Ukraine and supported the efforts of pro-Russian separatists.

==== Far-left volunteers ====
Left-wing volunteers have gone to fight for the pro-Russian forces, accusing the Ukrainian government of being a "fascist state" and seeking to engage in an "anti-fascist struggle". However, these leftist volunteers have co-operated with far-right groups in Donbas. Among the initial volunteers were members of the Communist Party of Ukraine, as well as some members of trade unions and labor organizations opposed to the new government that emerged after the Euromaidan Ukrainian Revolution.

A small number of Spanish socialists travelled to Ukraine to fight for the separatists, with some explaining they were "repaying the favour" to Russia for the USSR's support to Republicans during the Spanish Civil War. They were also enlisting in solidarity with those who died in the Unions House fire. Spanish fighters established the 'Carlos Palomino International Brigade', which fought under the flag of the Second Spanish Republic. In 2015, it reportedly had less than ten members. Other examples include the 'DKO' (Volunteer Communist Unit) and the Interunit, both composed of foreign communist volunteers.

Latvian communist of Ugandan and Russian descent Beness Aijo was arrested in Donetsk in 2014 for fighting with separatist forces and the National Bolshevik Interbrigades. A female member of the Israeli Communist Party had also reportedly gone to fight for the separatists in 2015.

==== Far-right volunteers ====
Far-right foreign fighters from Europe and to a lesser extent North America have fought alongside the pro-Russian separatists in Donbas, including white nationalists, neo-Nazis, fascists, and Christian extremists. Motivations for these fighters have included the belief that they are fighting America and Western interests and that Vladimir Putin is a bulwark for traditional white European values who they must support against the decadent West.

One notable far-right group is the French organisation Continental Unity, which has been accused of recruiting far-right extremists across Europe to come and fight in Donbas. Other far-right groups include the Bulgarian nationalist Orthodox Dawn Battalion and the Hungarian nationalist Legion of Saint Istvan.

Finnish far-right individuals and neo-Nazis have been recruited for the war in Ukraine by local far-right pro-Russian parties and then trained by the neo-Nazi Russian Imperial Movement. Finnish volunteer group Karhu (Bear) joined and fought with the Russian neo-Nazi Rusich Group when they were subordinate to Prizrak. According to Polish media, Rusich is mainly Russian but "several dozen" Polish and Finnish neo-Nazis fight in its ranks. A delegation of Finns, including the leader of the ultranationalist Finnish People First-party Marco de Wit, visited Donbass and Finnish volunteers there. The group included Johan Bäckman and Janus Putkonen, known for recruiting Finnish volunteers.

Some Italian far-right militants are aligned with the pro-Russian separatist militias of Donbas.

In July 2026, Noah Krieger, a Chechen-born emigrant to Germany and member of the far-right Alternative for Germany political party announced the creation of a unit made up of pro-Russian German citizens. In the announcement, where he also vowed to ″march on Germany″ after the end of the war in Ukraine, he did not provide details regarding the number of personnel or status of the formation or its place within the Russian military structure.

==== Middle Eastern and African volunteers and mercenaries ====
Following its 2022 offensive, US and Ukrainian intelligence have alleged that Russia has sought to hire and already deployed fighters from forces it supports in places such as Syria, Libya, and the Central African Republic under the command of the Wagner Group private military forces. Fighters have reportedly included those from the pro-Syrian government National Defence Forces, Central African Union of Peace, and the pro-Khalifa Haftar Libyan National Army. The Libyan National Army denied any of its personnel were fighting for Russia in Ukraine.

The Iran-aligned Lebanese political party Hezbollah denied sending fighters to Ukraine after the General Staff of the Ukrainian Armed Forces accused some of their members of being among 1,000 Syrian mercenaries allegedly hired to fight in Ukraine.

Turkish media and Russian-American journalist Vera Mironova alleged that members of the Kurdistan Workers' Party and the People's Defense Units (both affiliated with the Kurdistan Communities Union) were fighting as mercenaries for Russian forces.

On 4 October 2022, the Syrian Observatory for Human Rights reported that 5 Syrian Arab Army soldiers of the 25th Special Mission Forces Division had been killed fighting for Russia during the 2022 Ukrainian southern counteroffensive.

In January 2023, the Syrian Observatory for Human Rights reported that just under 2000 soldiers of the Syrian Arab Army, specifically the 25th Special Mission Forces Division, had been deployed to fight on behalf of Russia in Ukraine. The SOHR had obtained a document allegedly from the Syrian Government, explaining the Syrian Army's budget and salaries affecting Syrian soldiers in Ukraine.

It was widely reported in October 2022 that the Wagner Group had attempted to recruit former members of the American-trained Afghan National Army Commando Corps which became defunct after the victory of the Taliban insurgency in August 2021.

In June 2024, Bloomberg reported that Russia was detaining and forcing Africans on work visas to decide between deportation or fighting in the war.

===== South Africa =====
In November 2025, The Guardian reported that South Africa had launched an investigation into 17 South African nationals present in Donbas, eastern Ukraine. The office of South African president, Cyril Ramaphosa, said that it had received distress calls from the individuals, men aged between 20 and 39, who had been "lured to join mercenary forces involved in the Ukraine-Russia war under the pretext of lucrative employment contracts". Although it was not clear which side they were fighting for, their presence in a region largely occupied by Russia and the reference of being lured by financial promises strongly suggests the men were enlisted by Russia. Eight individuals, including member of parliament Duduzile Zuma-Sambudla and SAfm radio presenter Nonkululeko Mantula, were arrested for alleged roles in recruitment, with Zuma-Sambudla resigning from parliament in response to the charges.

===== Kenya =====
In November 2025, Kenya said that more than 200 Kenyan citizens were fighting for Russia in Ukraine. Kenya's ministry of foreign affairs stated that Russian recruiters were still actively attempting to lure more Kenyan nationals into the war, adding that several nationals who were rescued near Nairobi while being prepared for deployment had been misled about their role, believing they were being recruited for non-combat roles. By February 2026, the Kenyan National Intelligence Service reported that the number of Kenyans recruited to fight for Russia after falsely being promised work had reached 1,000. On 16 March 2026, Kenya's Foreign Affairs Minister Musalia Mudavadi said that after discussions with Russian Foreign Minister Sergei Lavrov, an understanding reached with Russia means Kenyans will no longer be able to join the Russian Army. According to Mudavadi, more than 600 recruitment agencies were shut down over allegations of sending Kenyans abroad under false pretences. According to Africanews, the amount of Kenyan casualties remains unknown, and families searching for missing relatives have struggled to obtain information from Russian authorities.

In January 2026, several videos emerged online allegedly showing African mercenaries with Russian soldiers. In one of the videos, Russia was accused of strapping a landmine to an African mercenary's chest, after which the man was marched at gunpoint while the Russian in the video uses racist slurs and tells the mercenary he is being used as a "can opener". Another published video allegedly showed a group of African mercenaries in a forest singing in their own language, while the Russian soldier filming laughed at them and said ″look how many disposables there are″ and "they will be singing differently" when deployed to the front.

==== Other Asian volunteers ====
Satria Arta Kumbara, a former member of the Indonesian Marine Corps, fought for Russia in Ukraine after deserting in 2022, with a dishonorable discharge rendered in April 2023. He was subsequently stripped of his Indonesian citizenship for joining a foreign military without permission from the president.

On 23 July 2024, Tokyo reported the death of a Japanese national, an ex-JGSDF soldier who was last stationed in Osaka, and who was reportedly killed on 3 June.

==== American volunteers ====
Michael Gloss, son of Juliane Gloss, the CIA Deputy Director of Digital Innovation, died in April 2024 fighting for Russia in the invasion of Ukraine. He was posthumously awarded the Order of Courage.

Derek Huffman, an American from Texas, joined the Russian military in May 2025 after moving his family to Russia in search of "traditional values". According to his wife, Huffman, who has no previous military experience, was promised that he would have a non-combat role within the military, but was sent to the front after just weeks of training and learning Russian, which neither Huffman or his family speak or understand.

==== United Kingdom ====
On 24 August 2026, The Telegraph reported that Bradley Townsend, a 33-year old British citizen with no prior military experience, had been killed by a FPV drone in Lyman after volunteering to fight for Russia.

Also on September 2026, The Telegraph reported that Nathan Stobbart, a 30-year-old British national from Newcastle, moved to Russia in December 2024 to live with his girlfriend whom he subsequently married. In April 2025, Stobbart joined the Russian army allegedly after being threatened with the refusal of a visa renewal, and was deployed to fight in Ukraine, before being officially declared missing in action by his military unit on December 12, 2025.

=== Latin American mercenaries ===
Cuban mercenaries are reported to have participated in the conflict. In July 2025, a report from El Pais estimated as many as 20,000 Cubans had been recruited into the Russian Army since 2022, with around 200-300 killed. According to Verkhovna Rada member Maryan Zablotskyy, up to 40% of volunteers were part of the Cuban Armed Forces. In October 2025, Reuters reported that an unclassified US State Department cable estimated that 1,000-5,000 Cuban nationals were fighting alongside Russian forces, making up the second largest group of Russian-allied soldiers behind North Korea. Later that month, the Ukrainian Main Directorate of Intelligence stated that at least 1,076 Cuban nationals had fought or were fighting for Russia, with 96 having been killed or reported missing-in-action. Ukraine subsequently cited the Cuban government's alleged role in recruitment of mercenaries as a cause for closing the Ukrainian embassy in Havana.

In October 2025, Ukrainian military intelligence released intercepted communications allegedly showing Colombian mercenaries receiving orders to kill civilians.

=== Foreign expatriates in Russia ===
A number of African students or former students are known to have been recruited for military service on the Russian side. Jean-Claude Sangwa, a student from the Democratic Republic of the Congo (DRC) who had formerly studied in Rostov, was reported to have enlisted in Luhansk People's Militia in late 2021 alongside two other expatriates from the DRC or Central African Republic.

A number of other African former students are known to have been recruited by the Wagner Group after receiving criminal convictions while in Russia. Lemekani Nathan Nyirenda, a Zambian former student at the Moscow Engineering Physics Institute who had been sentenced to a nine-and-a-half year jail term, was killed while fighting for the Wagner Group in September 2022. Nemes Tarimo, a Tanzanian former student at Moscow Technological University who had previously received a seven-year jail term, was killed in similar circumstances in October 2022.

== Ukrainian side ==
=== Post-Soviet countries ===
Similarly to their opponents, many foreign fighters from the former Soviet Union have fought in the Russo-Ukrainian War for the Ukrainian side. These have included fighters from Armenia, Azerbaijan, Uzbekistan, the Baltic states, Belarus, and Georgia. Exiled Chechens opposed to Ramzan Kadyrov and some Russian dissidents have also taken up arms on behalf of the Ukrainians.

==== Georgia ====
Georgians have been participating in the conflict on the side of Ukraine, since 2014. Large formations such as the Georgian Legion that consist of 1,000 fighters, are mostly made up of Georgian, but also various other nationalities, including British.

Unofficially, since the launch of Russia's invasion in 2022, an estimated 1,500 Georgians are fighting for Ukraine in various Ukrainian Armed Forces units and the International Legion.

==== Belarus ====
Already during the War in Donbas (2014–2022), Belarusians fought alongside Ukraine, forming the Pahonia Detachment and the Tactical group "Belarus".

In spring 2022, it was reported that more than 200 Belarusian citizens have joined the Armed Forces of Ukraine to defend Ukraine from the Russian invasion, with another 300 volunteers from Belarus came through Poland. In July 2023, Radio Free Europe/Radio Liberty reported that around 450 Belarusians were fighting for Ukraine.

In the beginning of the full-scale invasion, Belarusians have created a separate battalion named after Kastuś Kalinoŭski to defend Kyiv. It later transformed into a regiment consisting of two battalions, u UAV unit and a medical company. The Kastus Kalinouski Regiment was also joined by Pavel Shurmei, a former Belarusian Olympic rower and world record holder.

Another Belarusian volunteer battalion fighting for Ukraine, a part of the Kastuś Kalinoŭski Battalion, was known as the Pahonia Regiment. It ceased to exist in 2023.

Other Belarusian units include the Belarusian Volunteer Corps which includes the Terror Battalion. There are also around 20 Belarusians fighting in the Second International Legion.

In June 2023, Valery Sakhashchyk, effective defence minister of the Belarusian United Transitional Cabinet (a government-in-exile opposed to the de facto government of Alexander Lukashenko) informed about the creation of the 1st separate amphibious assault company "Belarus", which is part of the 79th Air Assault Brigade. The Belarusian assault company is located in the Donetsk direction.

Several other Belarusians are fighting in different Ukrainian military formations as well.

=== Colombia ===
According to unofficial estimates from the International Legion, between 1,500 and 2,500 Colombians have volunteered to fight for Ukraine since 2022, of which 450 to 550 have been killed by September 2025. Many Colombian volunteers are military veterans. According to the Ukrainian military, Colombians make up 40% of all foreign volunteers in the Ukrainian Armed Forces.

in February 2024, Hector Bernal, a retired combat medic who said he trained more than 20 Colombian volunteers in 8 months, compared Colombians going to fight in Ukraine to Latin American migrants who go to the US in search of a better future, saying they are motivated by economic need in February 2024. One fighter with the callsign ″Checho″ said principle is what drove him to Ukraine in September 2023, and estimated around 100 other Colombians making the same journey.

Mario Iván Urueña Sánchez, an international law professor at Rosario University, noted that Colombian fighters are often deployed on high-risk missions without proper integration, protection, or support, leading to a "staggering death rate". Sánchez also said that, "there is a lot of discrimination, a lot of mistreatment" against Colombian volunteers. In a video from July 2023, a Colombian volunteer said, "They treat me like a dog, even though I have fucking shrapnel in my arm from defending your fucking country!" In an interview with Infobae, Marlon Gómez Torres, a 26-year-old volunteer from Cúcuta, Colombia, claimed that Latino volunteers were being used as cannon fodder.

=== Finland ===
According to the Finnish Ministry for Foreign Affairs, as of 30 April 2025, over 100 Finns have fought for Ukraine while over a dozen have been killed.

=== Hungary ===
According to an estimate by Fegyir Sándor that was made in July 2023, around 400 Hungarians have fought in the war so far while 30 of them "have unfortunately died." A Hungarian volunteer who goes by the callsign "Attila", told Hungarian media, "I have no problems in the Ukrainian army because of my Hungarianness. Everyone is respected here as they deserve. We have been serving together since the beginning of the war and we are respected as Hungarians. Unfortunately, this cannot be said of many of my fellow Hungarian citizens who have been brainwashed by the Orbán media."

=== United States ===
In March 2022, the Ukrainian government said that 3,000 Americans had volunteered to fight for Ukraine. In March 2025, Ukraine said that there was a "flood of applications from Americans" after the reelection of Donald Trump. Many Americans have served in the units of the International Legion while others have served in other units such as Chosen Company, and the Norman Brigade. Some Americans have also served in private military companies such as the Mozart Group (until its disbandment in January 2023) and the Forward Observations Group.

=== Fighters from other countries ===
Up to a hundred Estonian volunteers have joined the Armed Forces of Ukraine during the Russian invasion of Ukraine, three of whom have been killed.

Ajnad al-Kavkaz, a group of Chechen foreign fighters which fights on the side of the Syrian opposition, which was fighting the Russian government in the Syrian civil war, deployed some fighters to fight for the Ukrainian side. Like other Chechen foreign fighter groups across the world, they are motivated by anti-Russian sentiment stemming from the Chechnyan conflict.

Several Japanese nationals volunteered to join the Ukrainian military in the early days of the invasion in 2022.

A small number of South Koreans have also volunteered for Ukraine, although they were legally prohibited from doing so, due to concerns that it could cause diplomatic issues for South Korea. Four South Koreans had been convicted for serving in Ukraine by 2023.

Some Chinese nationals have covertly volunteered to join the war in the Ukrainian military, despite Chinese foreign policy of neutrality and narratives blaming the West and other countries supporting Ukraine instead of Russia.

Foreign expats living in Ukraine have also fought in the Ukrainian forces. Brahim Saadoun, a Moroccan national, studied in the country as a foreign student from 2019 and enlisted in the Ukrainian army in 2022. He was captured by Russian forces but released to Morocco in September 2022 in an agreement brokered by Saudi Arabia.

=== International Legion ===
Three days after the beginning of the Russian invasion in 2022, Ukrainian President Zelenskyy announced the establishment of the International Legion.

== List of notable expatriate units in Ukraine ==
=== Pro-Russian units ===
- Interbrigades
- Pavel Sudoplatov Battalion (made up of pro-Russia Ukrainians and foreign volunteers from Serbia.)
- Prizrak Brigade (Unofficially, attracts large numbers of foreign volunteers)
- Pyatnashka Brigade

=== Pro-Ukrainian units ===
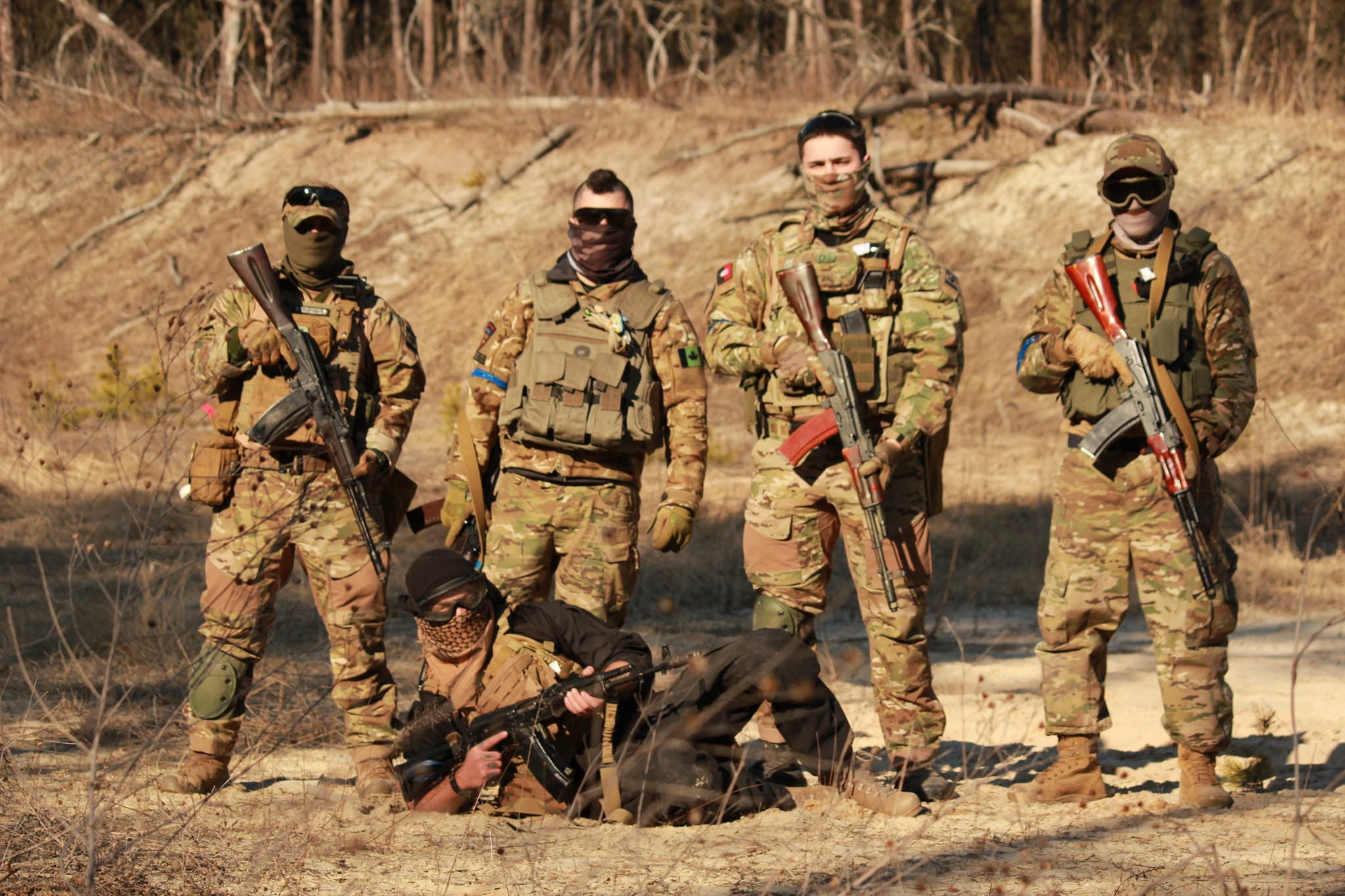
Members of the Norman Brigade

- Dzhokhar Dudayev Battalion
- Freedom of Russia Legion
- Georgian National Legion
- International Legion of Territorial Defense of Ukraine
- Kastuś Kalinoŭski Regiment
- Misanthropic Division
- Sheikh Mansur Battalion
- Turan Battalion
- Ajnad al-Kavkaz
- Norman Brigade
- Pahonia Regiment
- Russian Volunteer Corps
- Ichkerian Special Purpose Battalion
- Tactical group "Belarus"
- Russian Insurgent Army
- Karelian Group
- Sibir Battalion
- Belarusian Volunteer Corps
- Polish Volunteer Corps
- German Volunteer Corps
- Khamzat Gelayev Detachment
- Imam Shamil Dagestan Battalion
- NOMAD Unit
- Bashkir Company
- Black Bridge
- Bolívar Battalion
- Romanian Battlegroup Getica
- Armenian Legion

== Notable people ==
Pro-Russia

- Beness Aijo, Latvian Nazbol of Russian and Ugandan descent who was arrested and deported from Ukraine for fighting with the Interbrigades in 2014. He later returned to Ukraine to fight for the Donetsk People's Republic.
- Dejan Berić, Serbian sniper in the armed forces of the DNR.
- Russell Bentley, a former American soldier and communist who fought with Russian separatists in 2014 and returned in 2022 with the expressed intention of helping Russian forces. He was later tortured and killed by fellow Russian servicemen mistaking him for a US spy in 2024.
- Jerzy Tyc, Polish Pro-Russian activist who had previously renovated Soviet war memorials and military cemeteries in Poland, killed in Ukraine in September 2025.
- Bratislav Živković, Serbian mercenary and leader of extremist group known as the Chetniks, killed in Ukraine in January 2025.

Pro-Ukraine

- Trevor Cadieu, a three star Canadian general.
- Sandra Andersen Eira, Norwegian Sámi member of the Sámi Parliament of Norway (2017–2021) who joined the Ukrainian International Legion.
- Aleko Elisashvili, Georgian parliamentarian who joined the Ukrainian International Legion.
- Mamuka Mamulashvili, Georgian paramilitary leader and former soldier who leads the Georgian National Legion.
- Isa Munayev, Chechen rebel who led the Dzhokhar Dudayev Battalion before his death at the Battle of Debaltseve in 2015.
- Malcolm Nance, American author, media pundit, and former US Navy Senior Chief Petty Officer who joined the Ukrainian International Legion.
- Shaun Pinner, former British soldier who joined the Ukrainian Army as a volunteer and was captured and sentenced to death by the authorities of the Donetsk People's Republic. Later released in a prisoner exchange.
- Tseng Sheng-guang, Taiwanese indigenous veteran who volunteered in the Ukrainian International Legion and the Carpathian Sich Battalion, was the first East Asian soldier killed in action.
- Pavel Shurmei, Belarusian Olympic rower who joined the pro-Ukrainian Belarusian Kalinoŭski Regiment.
- Aliaksiej Skoblia, Belarusian dissident who defected to Ukraine in 2015 and led the Kalinoŭski Regiment. Skoblia was killed during the Battle of Kyiv (2022).
- Yulia Tolopa, Russian-born woman fighting on the side of Ukraine from 2014 to 2019

== See also ==
- International Legion (Ukraine)
- Ukrainian volunteer battalions
- Foreign fighters in the Syrian civil war and War in Iraq

== Bibliography ==
- Byman DL (3 March 2022), "Foreign fighters in Ukraine? Evaluating the benefits and risks", Brookings
- van Dongen T, Weijenberg G, Vugteveen M, Farrell-Molloy J (4 May 2022), "Foreign Volunteers in Ukraine: Security Considerations for Europe", International Centre for Counter-Terrorism
- Gall C (8 January 2023), "Now Fighting for Ukraine: Volunteers Seeking Revenge Against Russia", The New York Times
- Guarino M (6 November 2022), "Foreign fighters in Ukraine speak out on their willingness to serve: "I had to go"", ABC News
- Guerra N (10 May 2023), "The Russia-Ukraine war has shattered the Italian far right", Behavioral Sciences of Terrorism and Political Aggression, 17 (3): 245–265, doi:10.1080/19434472.2023.2206468, S2CID 258645197
- Liklikadze K, Tarkhnishvili N, Wesolowsky T (18 December 2022), ""We Have A Common Enemy": Georgian Soldier Says Ukraine's Fight Against Russia Is His Country's, Too", Radio Free Europe / Radio Liberty
- Mehra T, Thorley A (11 July 2022), "Foreign Fighters, Foreign Volunteers and Mercenaries in the Ukrainian Armed Conflict", ICCT
- Williams S (13 December 2022), "Why Taiwanese are among Ukraine's foreign fighters", BBC
