= TYC =

Tyc or TYC may refer to:

- Texas Youth Commission
- Tibetan Youth Congress
- Thomas Young Centre
- Torneos y Competencias, abbreviated as TyC
- Tycho Catalogue of stars, associated with the Hipparcos Catalogue
- TyC Sports, an Argentine pay television sports channel

== People ==
- Adam Tyc (born 1986), Czech sport shooter
- Jakub Tyc (born 1992), Polish figure skater
- Jerzy Tyc (1967–2025), Polish activist and soldier
- Roman Týc (born 1974), Czech street artist
- Wojciech Tyc (born 1955), Polish footballer
