= Bratislav Živković =

Bratislav Živković may refer to:

- Bratislav Živković (footballer), born 1970
- Bratislav Živković (soldier), 1975-2025
