= Death of Nemes Tarimo =

2022 incident in Ukraine

Nemes Raymond Tarimo
- Nemes Tarimo
- Born: Tanzania
- Died: 24 October 2022; Bakhmut, Ukraine
- Cause of death: Killed in action (gunshot wound)
- Parent: Luoida Sambulika (mother)

On 24 October 2022, Nemes Raymond Tarimo, a Tanzanian student and foreign expatriate in the Russo-Ukrainian War, was killed while fighting for the Wagner Group in September 2022. He was confirmed dead on October 24 when the Federal News Agency reported that he had died near Bakhmut, the scene of intense fighting in recent months.

== Background ==
Nemes Tarimo, a Tanzanian former student at Moscow Technological University who had previously received a seven-year jail term in January, 2021 on drugs-related offences.

== Disappearance and death ==
Tarimo was allegedly embedded with Ukrainian-backed combatants in Ukraine. His family members confirmed they last heard from him in early October 2022 when he had said he had agreed to sign up with the Russian mercenary group Wagner in exchange for being released from Russian prison and paid after fighting for Russia in Ukraine. Later the family learnt he died at the end of October while on a combat mission in Ukraine with Wagner. News of Tarimo's death circulated on social media with a video showing Russian men in military outfits holding candles around what was purportedly his casket. In the video, a picture of Tarimo, two medals, and a certificate were placed on the casket, which is draped with a flag of the Wagner Group.

== Aftermath ==
Tanzania government minister of foreign affairs, Stergomena Tax confirmed Tarimo's identity and stated he was serving a seven-year sentence in Russia and later given amnesty before joined the Wagner Group of mercenaries. Tax said according to the Tanzania laws, no Tanzanian is allowed to join the army of any country except the Tanzanian Army. She said all Tanzanians should ensure they comply with the laws of their country and the rules and procedures provided.

Russia's domestic news agency, The Federal News, says that Tarimo was awarded a posthumous medal "for courage" by the Wagner Group.

== See also ==
- Foreign fighters in the Russo-Ukrainian War
