= NOMAD Unit (Ukraine) =

Military unit

NOMAD
- НОМАД
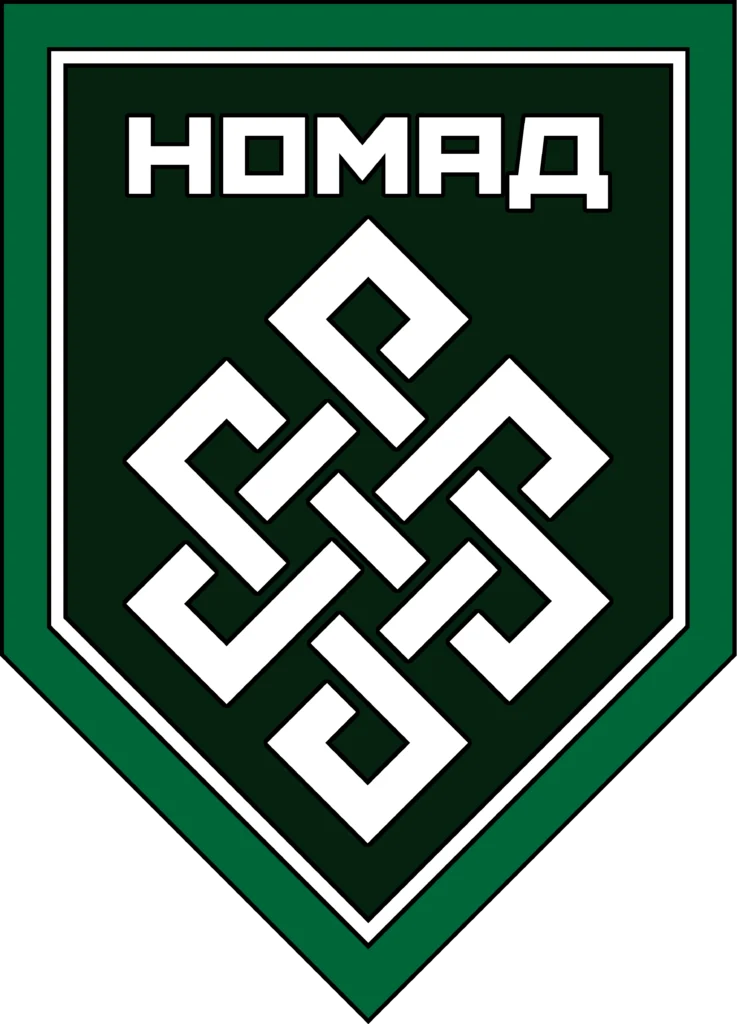
- Founded: 27 December 2024
- Country: Ukraine
- Type: Foreign volunteer regiment
- Role: Spetsnaz
- Size: 200+
- Part of: International Legion of the Defense Intelligence of Ukraine
- Garrison/HQ: Kyiv
- Motto: "Liberation of Homeland through the liberation of Ukraine"
- Engagements: Russian invasion of Ukraine
- Decorations
- Website: https://t.me/s/nomad_svoboda

Commanders
- Current commander: Callsign: Shaman

The NOMAD Unit is a volunteer military formation composed of indigenous peoples from the Russian Federation, fighting for Ukraine during the Russian invasion of Ukraine. Established on 27 December 2024, it joined the International Legion of the Defence Intelligence of Ukraine on 3 March 2025, the unit brings together individuals from various minority groups within Russia, united in their opposition to the Russian government and separatist ambitions.

It is staffed mainly by Kalmyks, Tatars, Buryats, Bashkirs and Yakuts. It includes both direct volunteers as well as prisoners of war.

== History ==
The NOMAD unit was officially established on 27 December 2024 with the aims of uniting the indigenous people of Russia wanting independence from the Russian Federation, after "months of bureaucracy" although it was unofficially operating before this date. It has been officially fighting as an official unit on the frontlines since December 2024.

It signed an agreement with a HUR-backed hotline for defecting Russian soldiers in late February 2025 to incorporate Russian defectors into the unit. It joined the International Legion of the Defence Intelligence of Ukraine on 3 March 2025.

== Composition ==
The Nomad unit includes Kalmyks, Tatars, Buryats, Bashkirs and Yakuts but any minorities under "Russian occupation" can join the unit. Its personnel include both volunteers and voluntarily fighting prisoners of war of the Russian Armed Forces. Russia has also raised units among Ukrainian POWs, such as the Bogdan Khmelnitsky Battalion which was formed in February 2023.

== Commanders ==
- Callsign: "Shaman"
