= Canadian-Ukrainian Brigade =

- Канадсько-українська бригада
- Canadian-Ukrainian Brigade chevron
- Founded: March 2022 – Unknown
- Country: Ukraine
- Branch: Territorial Defense Forces (until 2023); Ukrainian Ground Forces (2023 – Unknown)
- Type: Foreign volunteer battalion
- Role: Territorial defense
- Size: Unknown
- Part of: International Legion of Territorial Defence of Ukraine
- Garrison/HQ: Kyiv, Kyiv Oblast, Ukraine
- Engagements: Russo-Ukrainian War; Russian invasion of Ukraine
- Website: Official website

The Canadian-Ukrainian Brigade (Ukrainian: Канадсько-українська бригада, romanized: Kanadsko-ukrajinska bryhada) is a unit belonging to the International Legion of Territorial Defence of Ukraine which was formed in early 2022. The brigade is formed from individuals that are Ukrainian Combat Veterans or have been providing aid and training to Ukraine since the war in Donbas. These individuals came together under the umbrella of the brigade to set up a network spanning over Canada, France, Germany, Poland, and Ukraine. It is notable that the brigade consists of ex-Canadian servicemen and fresh volunteers.

== History ==
=== Formation ===
It is presumed that the unit was formed somewhere between late February and early March of 2022, after the announcement by President Volodymyr Zelenskyy that an international fighting force would be created to help defend Ukraine against the Russian invaders. Many citizens of Canada showed up to fight for Ukraine for the country's new foreign legion when it was established in late February 2022.

In March, 2022 it was reported by the National Post that 550 would-be fighters that have arrived from Canada so far are part of a battalion based in Kyiv. It was said to be called simply the Canadian-Ukrainian Brigade and had received its own arm patch featuring a maple leaf with a trident, Ukraine's national symbol superimposed on top.

At the time the office of Defence Minister Anita Anand said that "Canadians should continue to avoid all travel to Ukraine, and those in Ukraine should leave if it is safe to do so." This was then followed up several weeks later with Canada barring its soldiers from joining Ukraine's foreign legion, fearing that any captured service members could be used as a propaganda tool by Russia.

=== Recruitment ===
The brigade seeks to recruit volunteers who have typically no medical problems and have high physical fitness. The brigade has many areas of placements that volunteers can choose to pursue such as combat units, combat medics, and combat support. It is presumed that the unit comprises predominantly Ukrainian and Canadian volunteers. Canadians can sign up for the official Ukrainian-government program through various websites or by contacting the embassy and consulates directly, but Borys Wrzesnewskyj said many are simply “picking up and going” to Ukraine via Poland.

Ukrainian diplomats have said that the country would give priority to Canadians with military experience, but welcome anyone interested in joining the fight. The embassy is vetting those who have applied. At least some Canadians cleared to go to Ukraine will receive training in Poland, according to Borys Wrzesnewskyj and Chris Ecklund, a Hamilton, Ontario businessman who has set up his own group to assist those going overseas.

== Russo-Ukrainian War ==
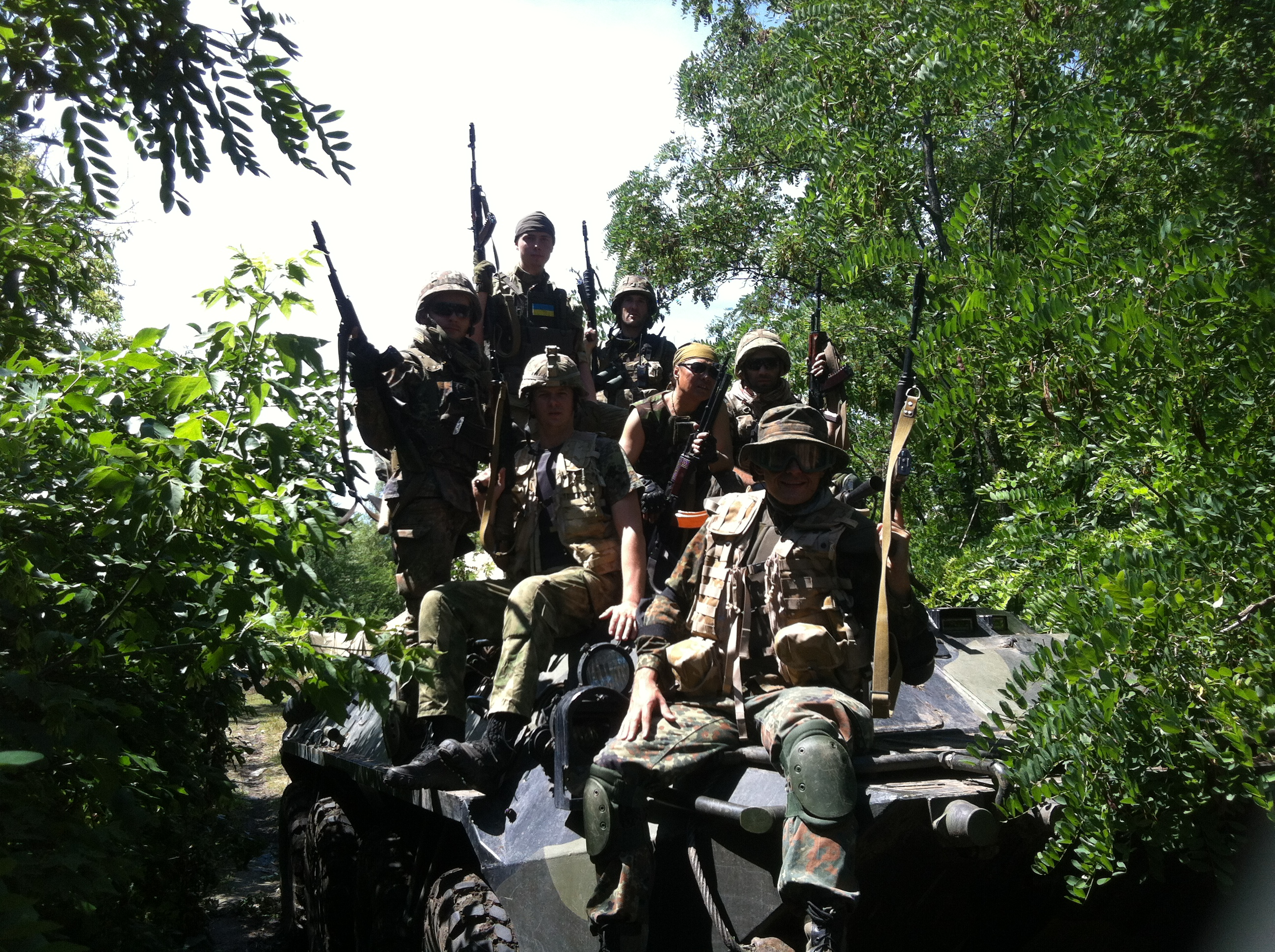
Several volunteers of the Brigade in Ukraine.

=== 2022 Russian invasion ===
In March 2022, it was reported by the National Post that 550 would-be fighters that have arrived from Canada so far are part of a battalion based in Kyiv.

It was mentioned by the National Post that "International legion volunteers are usually kept together for logistics purposes as it is easier for communication, to avoid language barriers". It further elaborated that many hundred more fighters had volunteered to fight in Ukraine. Borys Wrzesnewskyj, a former Liberal MP who is helping Ukrainian diplomats organise volunteers for the International Legion of Territorial Defence of Ukraine, said his rough estimate is that at least 1,000 Canadians have applied to join the force.

It is unknown how successful or impactful the brigade has had upon the conflict, however, it is presumed that operations are still functioning in the interests of Ukrainian freedom and independence.

On 10 March 2022, a video surfaced on Facebook of several Canadian-Ukrainian volunteers in an airport in Warsaw making their way to Ukraine to presumably join the Legion.

After 2024, there is virtually no information available about the Canadian-Ukrainian Brigade's activities in open sources. Since no official information about the unit's disbandment has been published, its current status remains unknown (same story with Muslim Corps).

== Structure ==
As of 2023, the brigade's structure is as follows:

- Canadian-Ukrainian Brigade
  - 1st Humanitarian Aid Platoon
  - 2nd Non-Lethal Military Aid Platoon
  - 3rd Training Platoon
    - First Section - Humanitarian Workers and Non-Military Frontline Personnel
    - Second Section - Military Training
  - 4th Recruitment Platoon
  - 5th Informative Operations Platoon
    - First Section – Media liaison
    - Second Section – Social Media
    - Third Section – Presentations and Briefings
  - 6th Administrative Support Platoon

== See also ==
- Norman Brigade
- Karelian National Battalion
