= International Legion of the Defence Intelligence of Ukraine =

Ukrainian military volunteer unit

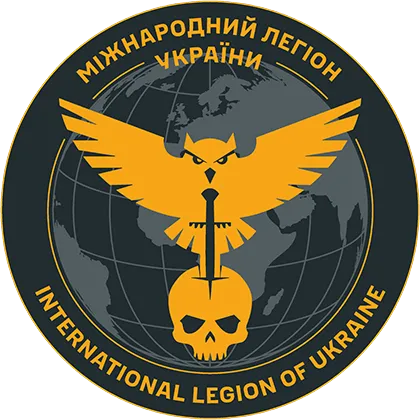
- Legion insignia
- Founded: 2022
- Country: Ukraine
- Allegiance: Ministry of Defence
- Branch: Main Directorate of Intelligence
- Type: Spetsnaz and International Volunteer Legion
- Role: Reconnaissance, counteroffensive and sabotage
- Part of: Main Directorate of Intelligence (administratively)
- Motto: Uniting Professionals for Solving Extreme Tasks
- Engagements: Russo-Ukrainian War; Russian invasion of Ukraine; Northern Ukraine campaign; Battle of Kyiv; Eastern Ukraine campaign; Battle of Sievierodonetsk; Battle of Lysychansk; Battle of Bakhmut; 2024 Kharkiv offensive; Southern Ukraine campaign; Battle of Mykolaiv; 2022 Kherson counteroffensive

Commanders
- Current commander: Major Vadym Popyk

Insignia
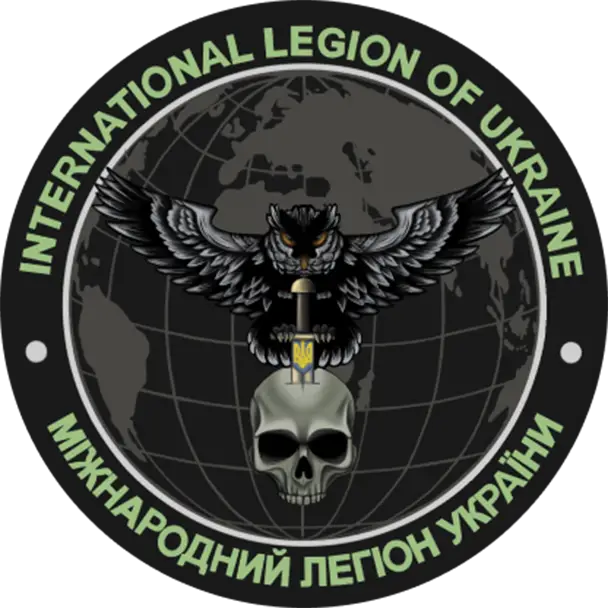
- Patch

The International Legion of the Defence Intelligence of Ukraine (MUN A3449) is a separate brigade-level unit of foreign fighters subordinated to the Main Directorate of Intelligence of the Ministry of Defence of Ukraine. The unit consists of several foreign units structured at various levels, typically being structured as either a battalion, or a squadron split into several teams functioning completely separate from the now dissolved International Legion, under the HUR MO operationally.

== History ==
The legion has participated in the Battle of Kyiv, Battle of Mykolaiv, Battle of Sievierodonetsk, Battle of Lysychansk, Southern Ukraine campaign, 2022 Kherson counteroffensive, Battle of Bakhmut and Kursk campaign amongst many more combat operations.

In November 2022, the legion participated in the 2022 Kherson counteroffensive.

In October 2024, the legion was involved in a special operation during the 2024 Kharkiv offensive.

== Tasks ==
The tasks of the Legion include combat missions in air, land, and water. It operates separately and independently from the Ukrainian Foreign Legion, under a different command structure, with different techniques, tactics, and procedures. It is bound and obligated to adhere to the highest standards of the requirements of the Constitution of Ukraine, the Manual of the Armed Forces of Ukraine, and all international laws signed by Ukraine.

== Commanders and Structure ==
Officially, the Legion is run by Major Vadym Popyk but Major Taras Vashuk, Vashuk's uncle (also Taras) and Sasha Kuchynsky constitute the top command of the legion.

At the operational and tactical levels, the Legion's individual squadrons are functionally directed using a NATO-style military staff system. Because the squadrons rely heavily on the experience of Western military veterans, squadron-level command relies on the standard continental staff shops (such as S2 for Intelligence, S3 for Operations, and S6 for Signal and Communications) to integrate intelligence, plan active operations, and maintain command and control during engagements.

== Structure ==
Patch	Name	Description
	A3449	The HUR unit which oversees and aids the operations of the following units.
	1st Squadron of International Legion	Linear Unit
	2nd Squadron of International Legion	Linear Unit
	3rd Squadron of International Legion	Linear Unit
	4th Squadron of International Legion	Linear Unit
	5th Squadron of International Legion	Linear Unit
	Freedom of Russia Legion	Volunteers are former servicemen of the Russian Armed Forces, as well as other Russians and Belarusians volunteers living in Ukraine.
	Russian Volunteer Corps	Volunteers from the Russian diaspora, more radical, ideological, and further right politically than the FRL. Led by Denis Kapustin.
	Karelian Group	Formed in 2023, consists of Karelians. The Battalion is a part of the Karelian National Movement.
	Sibir Battalion	Consists largely of indigenous Russian volunteers, whose end goal is their peoples' independence from the Russian Federation.
	Belarusian Volunteer Corps	Consists of Belarusians. Includes the Terror Battalion.
	Polish Volunteer Corps	Polish volunteers affiliated to the RVC.
	German Volunteer Corps	German volunteers affiliated to the 49th Infantry Battalion (Ukraine).
	Kastuś Kalinoŭski Regiment	Unit of Belarusian volunteers formed during the 2014 War in Donbas, maintains close ties with Sviatlana Tsikhanouskaya and the Belarusian opposition.
	Georgian Legion	Unit of Georgian volunteers formed during the 2014 War in Donbas, led by Mamuka Mamulashvili.
	Dzhokhar Dudayev Battalion	One of several Chechen volunteer armed formations fighting on the side of Ukraine. The battalion is named after the first President of the Chechen Republic of Ichkeria, Dzhokhar Dudayev. Their commander is Adam Osmayev.
	Khamzat Gelayev Detachment	One of several Chechen volunteer armed formations. The battalion was created in honor of one of the most respected Chechen commanders of the Chechen Republic of Ichkeria, Khamzat Gelayev. Many of its members are veterans from Gelayev's special forces.
	Ichkerian Special Purpose Battalion	One of several Chechen volunteer armed formations. The battalion is subordinate to the Ministry of Defence of the Chechen Republic of Ichkeria. Consists of Chechen veterans of the Chechen wars as well as the Syrian civil-war.
	Imam Shamil Dagestan Battalion	Consists of members of the several ethnic groups of Dagestan.
	NOMAD Unit	Composed of Indigenous people of various ethnic groups of the Russian federation.
	Bashkort Company	Composed of Bashkirs.
	Astra Team	
	"Cyclone" Reconnaissance and Strike Group	
	"Noble" Team	
	Phalanx Recon Team	
	"Solidarity" Special team	
	Drone Unit "ISR-X"	
	Special Intelligence Unit "NUR"	

Support units of the legion include:

- Intelligence group "GrecCompany"
- Tactical Group "Athena"
- Ronin Team Sniper and Reconnaissance Company
- Snake Medical Service
- Active Action Squad
- Delta Knights Squad

== Personnel ==
The Legion is composed of fighters, mostly veterans from all over the world. As of 7 March 2022, volunteers and veterans from 52 countries around the world, totaling over 20,000 people, had expressed their desire to join the Legion, mostly experienced fighters who had participated in many peacekeeping campaigns throughout the world. Most volunteers were from Poland, Scotland, Greece, Brazil, Colombia, the United States, Georgia, Norway, Australia and New Zealand. According to Kyiv Independent, this unit numbered up to 500 people and constituted approximately a third as company to the Foreign Legion.

External videos
- Від 18-річних до спецпризначенців: як Міжнародний легіон ГУР вербує іноземців on YouTube // DW Ukrainian. — 2024

== Controversies ==
The legion has been subjected to many controversies such as sexual abuse against female personnel of the legion, suicide missions, warcrimes, looting and many more.

Officially, the Legion is commanded by Major Vadym Popyk but actually Major Taras Vashuk, Vashuk's uncle (also Taras) and Sasha Kuchynsky exert a massive influence over the legion. The legionnaires have accused the trio of having conducted many crimes including incompetence and sending the soldiers for suicide missions. During the Battle of Mykolaiv, Russians discovered a position of the legion and heavily shelled it, others were evacuated and they were left alone to fend for themselves and hold the defenses. Due to the incompetence of legion commanders, an American volunteer Scott Sibley was killed and three were severely wounded. Just as one detachment was able to leave the position, another was sent there despite resistance by the legionnaires, again four volunteers were killed, several more were wounded, and one American volunteer Andrew Hill was captured and faces a possible execution, all due to the command's incompetence. At first, the Brazilian unit spent two weeks in demining operations in Zaporizhzhia Oblast. In early June 2022, a few days into the mission, they were suddenly shifted to take part in the Battle of Sievierodonetsk, completely unprepared, not even knowing the positions of friendly troops, the planning was done without coordination with other units. Due to a lack of communication and incompetence by the high command, a Brazilian legionnaire was killed and many more including the Brazilian Platoon leader were wounded, almost the entire platoon resigned as a result of the command's incompetence. During the Battle of Lysychansk, legionnaires were ordered by the command to loot a local shopping mall stealing valuables including furniture, shoes, women's clothes, jewelry, watches and electronics, many soldiers resisted the others and many were forced to comply.

An American Jewish volunteer, alleged that the command of the legion was antisemitic and discriminated against Jewish personnel.

Kuchynsky was reported to have tried to confiscate personal equipment from the legionnaires and even pointing guns at the personnel.

Kuchynsky also sexually harassed female medics in their unit, causing a few medics to leave the unit and the country and was constantly being covered up by other members of the high command.

It was even reported that Sasha Kuchynsky was not even the actual name but it was Piotr Kapuscinski, a former major Polish criminal who fled Poland in 2014 and emerged in October 2016 in Ukraine for committing sexual assault and aggravated robbery for which he faced jail time. In 2017, Poland requested his extradition but was refused. In May 2021, he was arrested for the illegal possession of a semi-automatic pistol and explosives facing seven years in prison but was released on bail. He volunteered to join the military in February 2022. He was once detained and questioned by the Security Service of Ukraine for drawing a gun on an American soldiers and then by the Military Prosecution Office for power, fraud, and assault.

The command has been known to misuse donated equipment, keeping a part for themselves and even selling some of the equipment to soldiers in order to get money. This corruption even led to two soldiers losing their hearing as a result for not having been able to obtain headphones that were kept in the armory but not provided to the soldiers.
