= Tseng Sheng-guang =

Taiwanese veteran, Ukrainian Foreign Legion soldier (1997–2022)

- Sincyang Diway
- Born: September 12, 1997; Ji'an, Hualien, Taiwan
- Died: November 2, 2022 (aged 25); Kreminna, Luhansk Oblast, Ukraine
- Cause of death: Mortar attack
- Other names: Jonathan Tseng 曾聖光 曾煜閎 (screenname on Facebook)
- Awards: Order for Courage of the third class (posthumous)
- Military career
- Allegiance: Taiwan (2016–2021); Ukraine (2022)
- Branch: Republic of China Army; Territorial Defence Forces: 49th Rifle Battalion
- Rank: Corporal (Taiwan); Volunteer (Ukraine)

Tseng Sheng-guang (Amis: Sincyang Diway; Chinese: 曾聖光; September 12, 1997 – November 2, 2022), also known as Jonathan Tseng, was a Taiwanese army veteran who volunteered to join the International Legion of Territorial Defence of Ukraine and was the first soldier from East Asia to be killed in action during the Russo-Ukrainian War.

== Early life and education ==
Tseng was born in a Taiwanese indigenous family of the Sakizaya ethnic group in the Hualien County in East Taiwan – an ancient Austronesian nation of six tribes which been massacred to almost extinction by the Qing expedition army. The last Sakizayan survivors after the racial cleansing through the Huadong Valley took refuge into the highland Amis tribes in the Hai"an mountain range for 129 years until the extended population of hundreds of people received official recognition to recover their ethnic status in 2007.

Later, Tseng's parents immigrated to Belize but divorced, and his mother brought him back to Taiwan. When he returned to Taiwan, he learned English, Spanish, Amis and Taiwanese Mandarin, and represented his local high school to participate in an English competition where he won second place.

== Military career ==
Tseng joined the army in 2016 after high school graduation, and served 5 years in an armoured battalion and in the 2nd Logistics Department of the Huadong Defense Command, achieving the rank of corporal, and was honorably discharged in 2021.

On June 19, 2022, Tseng joined the International Legion of Territorial Defence of Ukraine to fight against the Russian invasion, and in the beginning of September, entered the Carpathian Sich Battalion, an earlier Special Tasks Patrol Police company of the Ministry of Internal Affairs that had been reformed in May as the 49th Infantry Battalion in the Armed Forces of Ukraine. The unit participated in the counteroffensive operations of the Eastern Ukraine campaign and stood on the forefront to provide flanking maneuver support in the battle of Donbas to recover the strategical cities as Russian logistics transmission centers of Izium and Lyman, where massive graves were uncovered. The Carpathian Sich Battalion went on to secure more settlements and a series of dams in the northern Donetsk Oblast by October 3.

On October 23, Tseng's light infantry troop was assigned from Terny in the Lyman direction of the Donetsk Oblast to Kreminna in the Luhansk Oblast, and took out three positions in the following days, then held the frontline awaiting the main force for nine days. On November 1, air-strikes hit the troopers and Tseng hard with concussion; after covering three colleagues to retreat under the Russian artillery and tank siege next day, Tseng suffered from a head injury and a broken left leg by a mortar bombardment, then died of bleeding, becoming the first East Asian soldier to be killed in action in the war, Tseng's teammate, Australian sniper Trevor Kjeldal (dubbed "Ninja"), also was killed in action by a mortar attack in the same battle. A friend of Tseng, a Japanese volunteer in the Ukrainian Foreign Legion and a colleague in the 49th Infantry Battalion, nicknamed Dobure posted Tseng's pictures online in lament, stating: "Be my friend in next life" who was later killed in action too on November 9.

Ukrainian Parliament Foreign Affairs Committee Chairman Oleksandr Merezhko, Deputy Battalion commander Ruslan Andriyko, and Tseng's American troop leader nicknamed as "Boris", paid tribute to Tseng and Taiwan. Tseng’s mother comforted: "Knowing that, in the last moments of his life, Sheng-guang was fighting alongside a group of the bravest warriors, that they supported each other and were together in life and death… I find a lot of consolation."

== Personal life ==
Tseng was born baptised with a Protestant Christian family and was associated with the Presbyterian Church in Taiwan, whereas the missionaries had serviced the remote countryside and highland villages for over 150 years since 1865, throughout his life. He was married, and fathered one child. His widowed wife is currently working in Taoyuan.

He paid attention to the ROC military reform issues, and shared the publicized analyses of other professional commentators, including that the Han Kuang Exercises had become "acting shows", that were not practical in line with actual operations; the four-month conscription service was too short and should be upgraded to one year; and traditional Huangpu ideology, bayonet fighting technique, Vietnam War strategies, etc. were hindering Taiwanese military reforms; and considered that "the Civil defense system, the reserve mobilization system, the disaster response capability, and the strategic material reserves are immature and some even non-existent..."

During the Chinese military exercises around Taiwan in August, Tseng considered to return from Ukraine to re-join the Taiwanese military, ultimately remaining in Ukraine. In response to Chinese nationalist netizens criticising to his Facebook account as a "damn Taiwanese independence supporter", he replied: "I am a Taiwanese, not a Chinese."

Shortly after Tseng's death news revealed, a document was posted online showing unpaid credit card debts and bills summed up to NT$ 1 million dollars (approximately $32,500 US dollars), and sparked doubt on his actual motive to go to Ukraine. His Taiwanese church chaplain, clergies and Ukrainian officials explained that "his true intention was based on the sense of justice with no desire of heroism, but hearing the call to protect the innocent civilians from brutality and life danger, and telling Taiwan: 'the war was never too far from us', but 'let justice roll on like a river, and righteousness like a never-failing stream!'" (Amos 5:24) Ukrainian Parliamentarian Inna Sovsun saw Tseng as a Ukrainian soldier, stating that Tseng "had a sense of duty for freedom. For four years, he prepared to defend his motherland from Chinese invaders, but he went to defend a foreign country, which faced the same threat as his."

== Aftermath ==
On November 11, 2022, an amateur Taiwanese "Fun Chi Band" (放志樂團) of 6 members released a MV song to commemorate Tseng's spirit fighting for the democracy and freedom in Ukraine.

In the farewell ceremony held at the Saints Peter and Paul Garrison Church in Lviv on November 15, Tseng's family received the honour of a Ukrainian national flag with a medal, his battalion emblem and wearing Ukraine-Taiwan-united armband, along with a Russian bayonet in recognition of his sacrifice. Tseng was cremated, and his ashes returned to Taiwan. On December 4, ROC Minister of Council of Indigenous Peoples, Icyang Parod, awarded them the top indigenous honor, First-class Professional Medal, posthumously.

=== Military reform ===
From December 21–27, Russia and China held a joint live fire exercise, dubbed "Maritime Interaction-2022", off Zhoushan and Taizhou in the East China Sea, north of Taiwan, to "further deepen" their cooperation, less than a week after Japan announced its defense budget increase in response to the increasing security threats, including their joint bombers exercises of Tu-95s and H-6Ks near its airspace in November and their 2021 circumnavigation of Japanese main islands by a joint Chinese-Russian flotilla. The flagship Varyag missile cruiser, the Marshal Shaposhnikov destroyer, 2 corvettes of the Pacific Fleet and 2 destroyers, 2 patrol ships, 1 multipurpose supply ship, 1 submarine of the People’s Liberation Army Navy participated the drills with Russian sailors speaking in Mandarin Chinese, and Russian ships fired missiles.

On Christmas, Formosa Republican Association held a memorial concert for Tseng, quoting President J. F. Kennedy's address to be active citizens: "Ask not what your country can do for you—ask what you can do for your country", in the Paper Church (built with Japanese donation after 1999 Jiji earthquake) in Puli, Nantou. Tseng's family also donated all the retrieved Tseng's items from Ukraine to the National Museum of Taiwan History in Tainan (Ancient capital of Tungning Kingdom) for public exhibition.

On December 27, President Tsai Ing-wen followed up after a national security meeting to announce the military reform in Taiwan: conscription term scaling-up to one year with salary increase; shifting the focus on the bayonet fighting techniques to the practical hand-to-hand combat skills; increasing the basic training contents including first aid and modernized weapon operations, and the strategical and structural re-design in line with Ukrainian experiences and American modules. She quoted Winston Churchill to confront authoritarianism, and stated: "Ukraine is still struggling, and the firm will of the Ukrainian people to protect their homeland has inspired people all over the world who love democracy and freedom."

On April 10, 2023, the Anonymous hacking group defaced a Russian website that solicits donations for law enforcement organizations where they uploaded a memorial to Tseng Sheng-guang. Besides that, the hacking collective argued that the "firsts" achieved by the Soviet Union during the Space Race were exaggerated and were far surpassed by U.S. accomplishments.

On April 28, President Volodymyr Zelenskyy issued the No. 246 Decree awarding the Order for Courage of the third class to nineteen non-commissioned officers and soldiers, including Tseng and Kjeldal, for their self-sacrificing performance in military duty.

=== Sheng-guang Project ===
On 9 November 2023, ROC Ministry of Foreign Affairs announced the "Sheng-guang Project" to continue the humanitarian aids of civil society donations in cooperative initiatives with East European states to assist Ukrainian refugees, medical, transport and power system reconstruction need. A logo of "Taiwan Stands Up for Freedom" in three languages under Tseng's Sakizaya nation totem circled with the defense bamboos of their last stand at Takubuwa a kawaw in 1878 was designed to integrate the future support efforts.

== See also ==
- Aliaksiej Skoblia
- Oleh Kutsyn
- Peng Chenliang
