= Norman Brigade =

Ukrainian international volunteer unit (2022–2024)

- Норманська бригада Normansʹka Bryhada; Brigade Normande
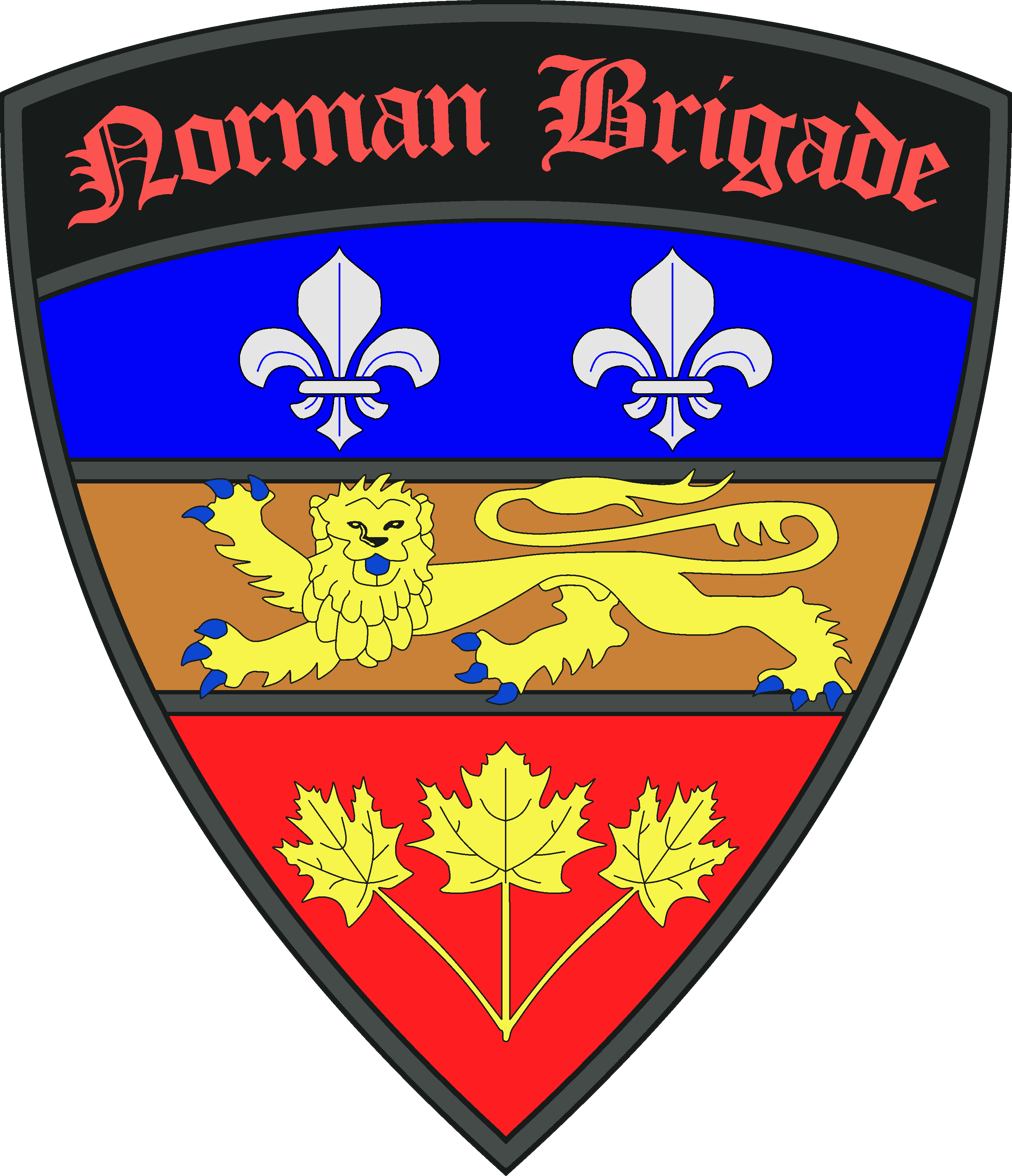
- Norman Brigade chevron
- Active: March 2022 – March 2024
- Allegiance: Ukraine
- Branch: Ukrainian Ground Forces
- Type: Foreign volunteer unit
- Role: Light infantry
- Size: Unknown
- Part of: Ukrainian Volunteer Army (2022, 2023); 126th Territorial Defense Brigade (2022–2023); 48th Assault Battalion (2023–2024)
- Motto: "Beyond Words"
- Engagements: Russo-Ukrainian War; Russian invasion of Ukraine; Southern Ukraine campaign; Eastern Ukraine campaign; Battle of Donbas; 2023 Ukrainian counteroffensive
- Website: Official Twitter page Official Facebook page

Commanders
- Notable commanders: Jean-Francois "Hrulf" Ratelle (March 2022 – March 2024) †

Insignia
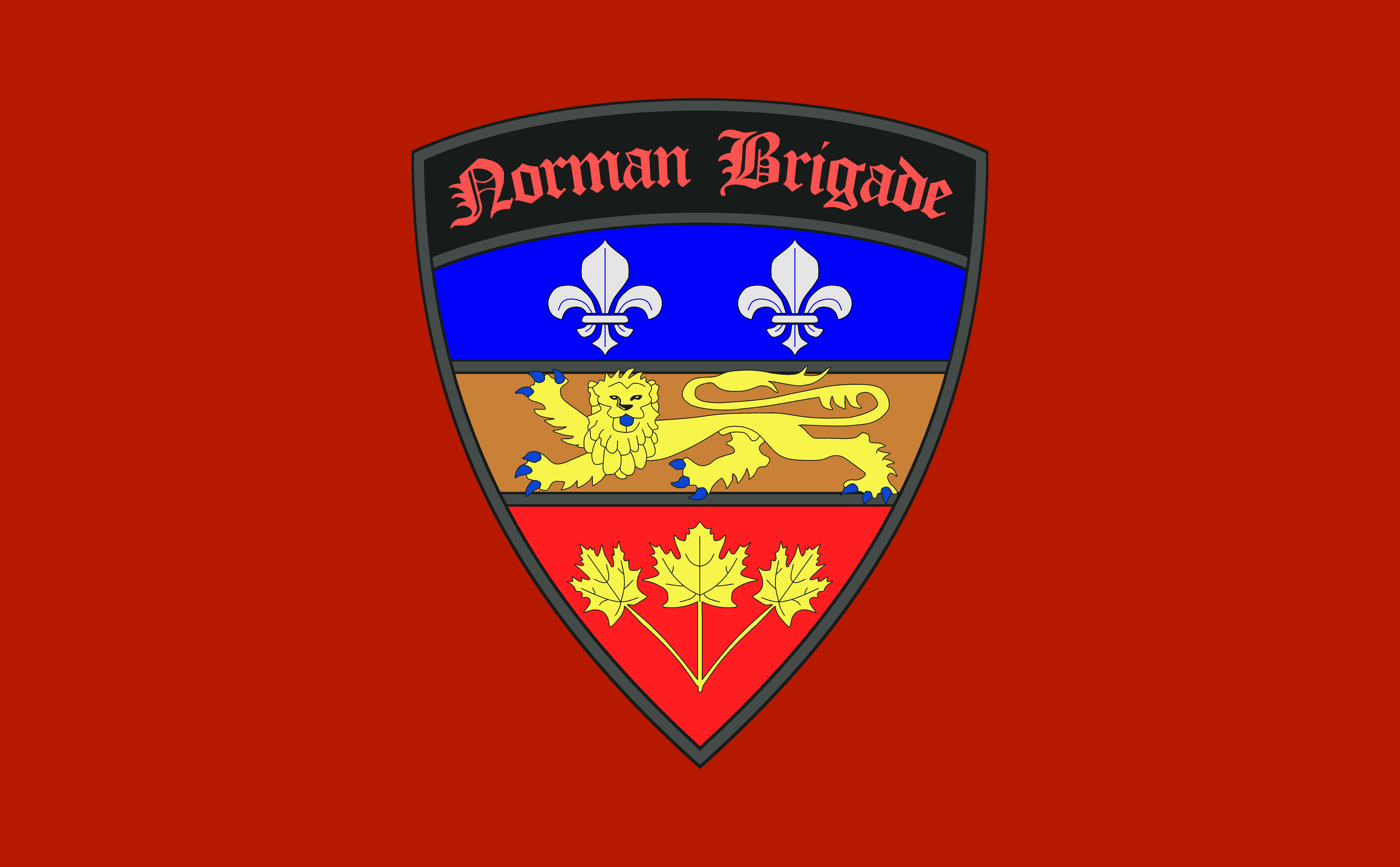
- Retired Flag of the Norman Brigade

The Norman Brigade (Ukrainian: Норманська бригада, romanized: Normans'ka Bryhada) was a foreign unit composed of foreign volunteers that was formed in early 2022. The unit is formed by veterans and volunteers from Sweden, Denmark, Poland, Germany, Spain, France, Australia, New Zealand, South Africa, Portugal, Italy, Jordan, Egypt and Norway, in addition to the United States, Canada, and Great Britain.

The name of the group alludes to the fact that many Quebecers are descendants of settlers from France's Normandy region. Its members are almost entirely military veterans, who either have family in Ukraine or were simply appalled by the invasion and reports of Russian war crimes.

== History ==
=== Formation ===
Presumably, the unit was created around early March 2022, as a reaction to the announcement by President Volodymyr Zelenskyy that an international fighting force would be created to help defend Ukrainian independence against the Russian invasion. The commander, going by the name "Hrulf" for security reasons, elaborated that he set up the unit for personal reasons which included "to do my part to defend Ukraine, my family and its values". Many citizens of various countries including Sweden, Denmark, Poland, Germany, Spain, France, Australia, New Zealand, South Africa, Portugal, Italy, Jordan, Egypt and Norway, in addition to the United States, Canada and Britain had joined the "Norman Brigade", a formation described as a volunteer unit part of the Ukrainian Volunteer Army. The unit had recruited a fair number of veterans, including British, Canadian, and American, though arguably the most famous fighter that joined this unit was the "world's deadliest sniper", who went by the name of 'Wali'.

It can be assumed that the Norman Brigade first began as independent or as part of the Ukrainian Volunteer Army, a separate formation that was established after Dmytro Yarosh departed from the Right Sector movement.

On 2 December 2022, the Norman Brigade announced on social media that the unit became officially integrated as part of the Armed Forces of Ukraine, joining the branch of the Territorial Defense Forces, amongst the 126th Territorial Defense Brigade based in Odesa. The first couple of Norman Brigade members began signing their contracts on the same day.

After encountering administrative inconsistencies throughout 2023, the unit was said to have returned to the Ukrainian Volunteer Army where they resided until early November 2023. The unit on 1 November 2023 announced that they had become the foreign branch of the 48th Separate Assault Battalion.

It was alleged that the commander of the unit was a Canadian of Norman ancestry. The name of the unit is in reference to the first Norman settlers who colonized New France during the 1500s and 1600s. The unit was said to be based in a southeastern Ukrainian municipality relatively close to fierce fighting.

=== Recruitment ===
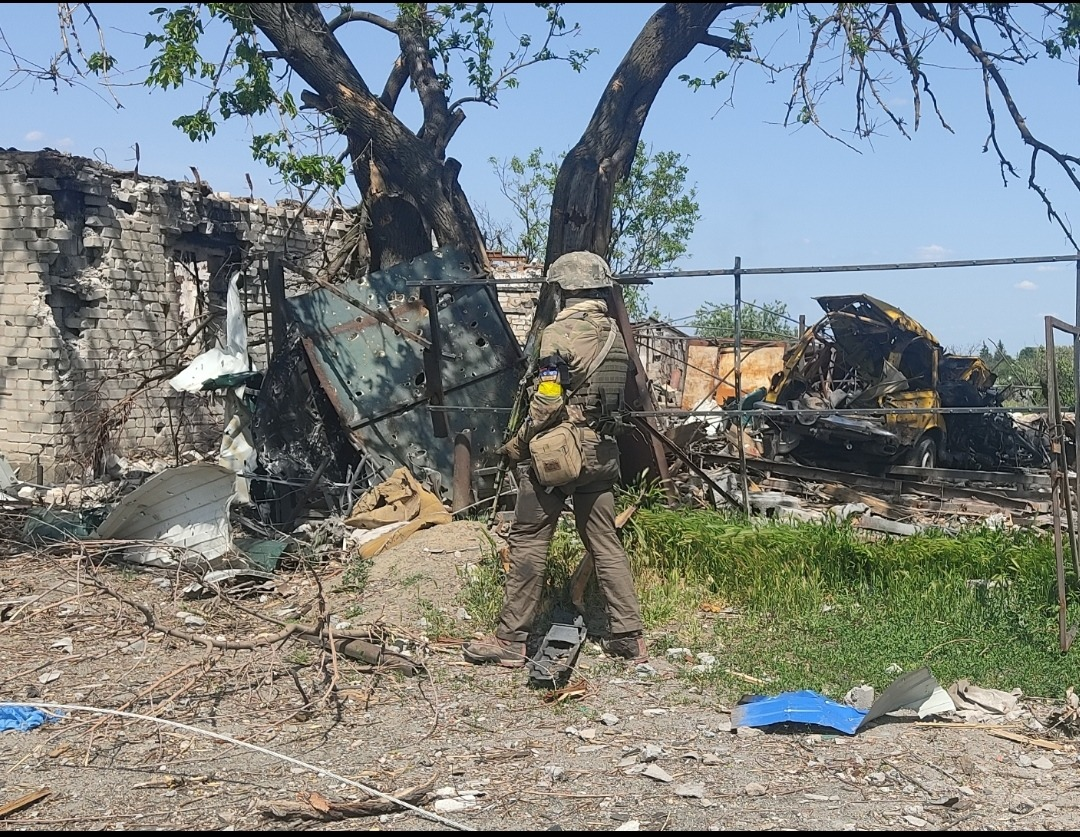
Member of the Norman Brigade on patrol.

The Norman Brigade had a strict set of principles for individuals who sought to join their ranks, these being relevant military experience in any combat trade, combat experience, in "acceptable" physical shape and condition, and between the ages of 18 and 45 years of age. Many positions were acknowledged to be open, ranging from combat medics, to combat engineers, mortar specialists, mechanics, instructors, combat translators, drone operators, and electronic warfare specialists.

The unit in late November 2022, published on Facebook that the unit was recruiting for five frontline translators who met their desired criteria. The strict criteria for individuals to apply were to be of a suitable age between 25 and 45 years of age, possess military experience, speak all three English, Ukrainian, and Russian fluently, and have a clean medical history as well as good health. It stated that the assignment was under contractual agreements. This could ultimately suggest that the unit has had some difficulties with communication and translation, a problem that has been encountered by many foreign volunteers serving in Ukraine.

On 19 February 2023, the Norman Brigade put out an announcement on Facebook that recruitment efforts were once again taking place, this was similar as the initial recruitment drive prior with the minimum age of recruitment now being raised from 18 to 21 years of age. The Facebook announcement was accompanied by a training video of the Norman Brigade somewhere in Ukraine, predominantly small arms weaponry training and manoeuvres.

An additional recruitment effort by the Norman Brigade began on 19 March 2023, where they stated that they were currently recruiting with the criteria being relevant military experience in any combat trade or whether an individual has combat experience, acceptable physical shape, and the applicant being between the ages of 21 and 45.

As of July 2023, the unit had laid out a new set of rules for recruiting individuals who were interested in supporting and fighting for the Ukrainian cause. This includes relevant military experience which is mandatory for all volunteers, candidates requiring to be between the ages of 21 and 45 years of age and the ability to complete a 10-kilometre run followed by a preselection called "hell week".

=== Relations and allies ===
According to several publications, the brigade has several allies. A Facebook post published in July 2022, stated that in an undisclosed location, freedom fighters of the Sheikh Mansur Battalion, Wallonia, and the Norman Brigade, met to discuss possible force-multiplying actions, the publication further went on thanking the accompanying units and remarked that "Ukrainians, Chechens, Wallons, and Normans are fighting against a common evil called 'Russian supremacism'. The invaders should have stayed at home".

The Norman Brigade is said to have strong ties with the Ukrainian Volunteer Army but had a pause in relationships later defined as an "operational pause", which allowed the unit to explore different formats of integration with the Ukrainian Army.

=== Controversies and allegations ===
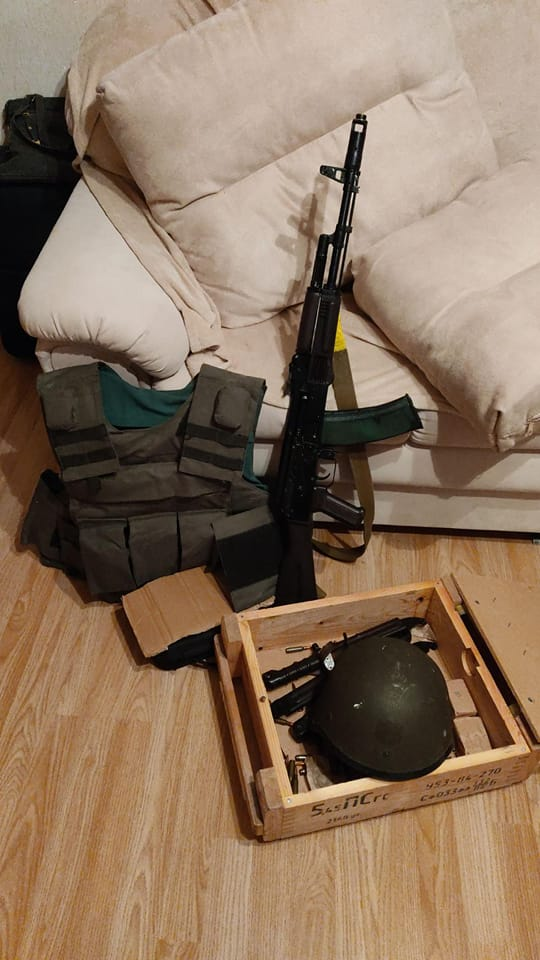
Equipment of the Norman Brigade

An article published by the National Post in May 2022, stated that there were allegedly numerous issues with the volunteer unit suggesting it was poorly organised and underequipped. Despite this, there was no solid evidence to confirm or otherwise reinforce these claims at all.

Former members of the unit claimed that the unit, led by 'Hrulf', lacked adequate weaponry and protective gear, even stating that there were only just a couple of Kalashnikov rifles and minimal ammunition per person. Moreover, accommodation were described as "dungeon like" with members claiming to receive only two meals a day and sleeping on the floor alongside enduring drafty and damp conditions in a converted schoolhouse used as a training camp as recruitment increased. Despite these claims, notable members of the Norman Brigade such as 'Wali' stated that he didn't believe that the unit was not particularly ill-equipped for battle, mentioning that Westerners take equipment such as medical supplies, weapons, and ammunition for granted and that the unit was equipped the same way as many other Ukrainian units.

Critical former members would later go on to claim that they had instead joined the ranks of the International Legion, regarding it as more professionally competent in equipment as well as leadership. This notion was however challenged by the commander 'Hrulf', pointing to text messages of foreign fighters previously leaving the Legion due to the incompetence of the Ukrainian officers. Moreover, an accusation of extremism occurred with members supposedly discovering a black sun tattoo on the hand of 'Hrulf'. It was later debunked and proven to be false through the testimony of multiple members who were there at the time.

In light of all these allegations and claims, the Norman Brigade had published several posts on Twitter calling the National Post's article a "hit piece" and inaccurate, being unreflective of the actual volunteer unit itself. Additionally, an hour-long Twitter Space was published going through the article and debunking all of its allegations made against the unit. It had been remarked as early as April 2022 that the unit had made a reputable name for itself, despite these allegations that attempted to plunder its reputation.

== Russo-Ukrainian War ==
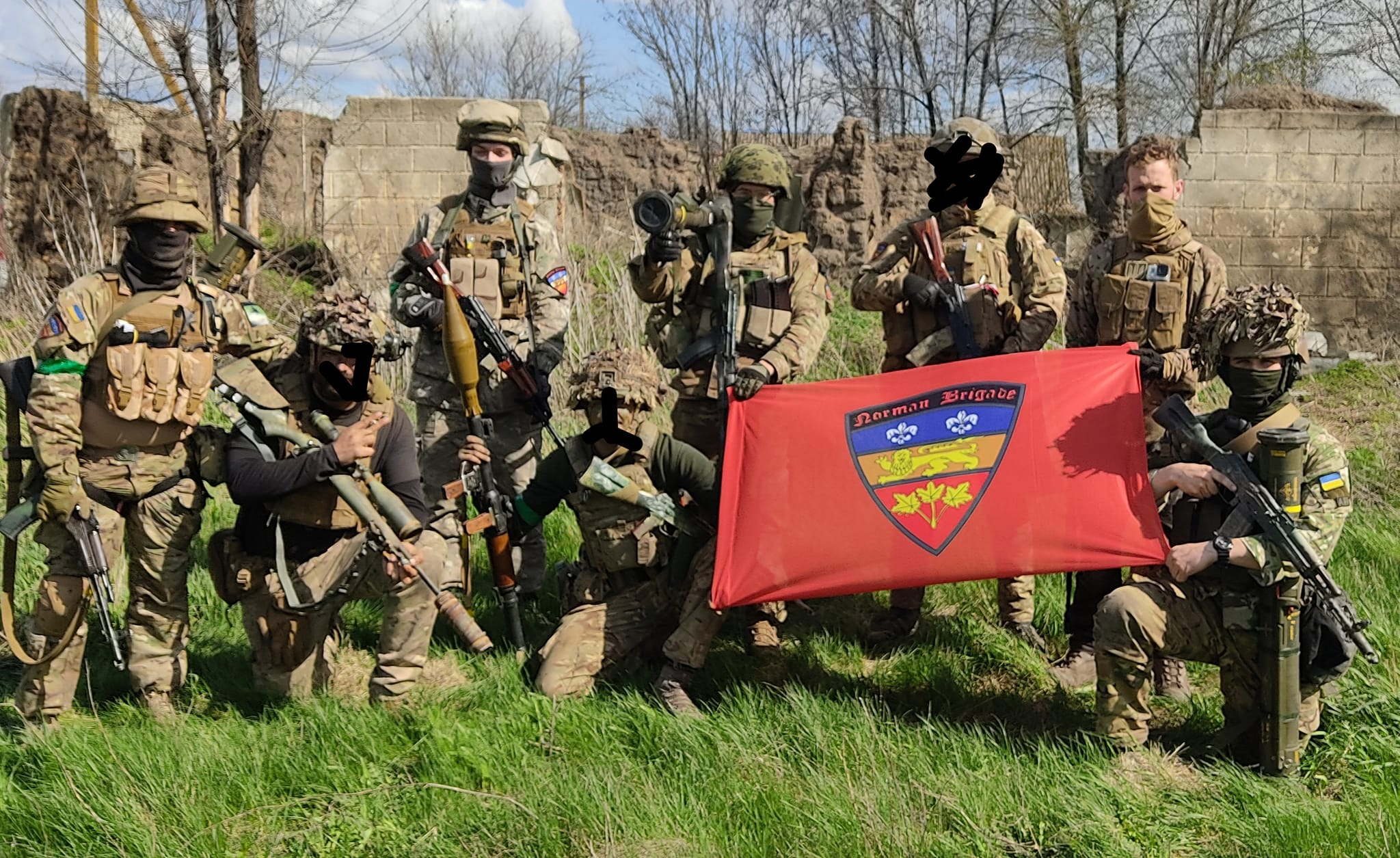
Several volunteers of the Norman Brigade in Ukraine.

=== 2022 Russian invasion ===
Due to social media publications, it is known that the unit has participated in various operations towards the Southern and Eastern directions of the frontline in Ukraine, the unit stated on a Twitter post that they had taken position in the Velyka Novosilka sector, in trenches which spanned between the settlements of Velyka Novosilka, Neskuchne, and Vremivka.

While some claim it is unclear to what extent such foreigners will make a tangible difference in the war, the commander 'Hrulf' in an interview in early 2022 had stated that they seemed to be a morale-booster for Ukraine's military and civilians.

It is known that the unit has made significant contributions in providing humanitarian aid to the Southern and Eastern municipalities of Ukraine. Their efforts encompass a range of activities to support locals, such as delivering medical assistance and supplying medical personnel. The brigade further aided the survival and well-being of those affected by conflict by distributing supplies such as food, water, clothing, and other essential items. Overall, helping to alleviate the suffering and helping civilians in these regions. A Twitter publication stated that the people of the agglomerations of Velyka Novosilka, Neskuchne and Vremivka, had "suffered so much".

=== Decorations and awards ===
On 8 September 2023, in Dnipro, foreign soldiers who were members of the Norman Brigade were awarded the "Brother for Brother" medal. The awards were presented by joint committee of charitable foundations and Prykarpatia Defense Headquarters. The first recipients of this medal were the foreign Azov fighters who received the awards in 2016. Co-initiator Iryna Forostyan said that fighters from Great Britain, France, Belgium, and the United States were fighting for the freedom of Ukraine.

In a video published on Youtube by Social Dnipro the commander of the unit 'Hrulf' was present at the awards ceremony, stating the reasons for fighting in the war was due to the fact that he had a daughter and family that were Ukrainian. Another member of the unit mentioned in an interview that he left everything in order to help in the struggle for Ukraine's freedom.

The official Norman Brigade Facebook page wrote a post stating that the Norman Brigade received awards and medals, they also stated that they had also awarded three Normans fighting with the Main Directorate of Intelligence of Ukraine including one posthumously, one member of the Hospitallers Medical Battalion, two members from the 3rd Separate Battalion "Volyn" of the Ukrainian Volunteer Army and one member of the Ukrainian Resistance.

== Notable members ==
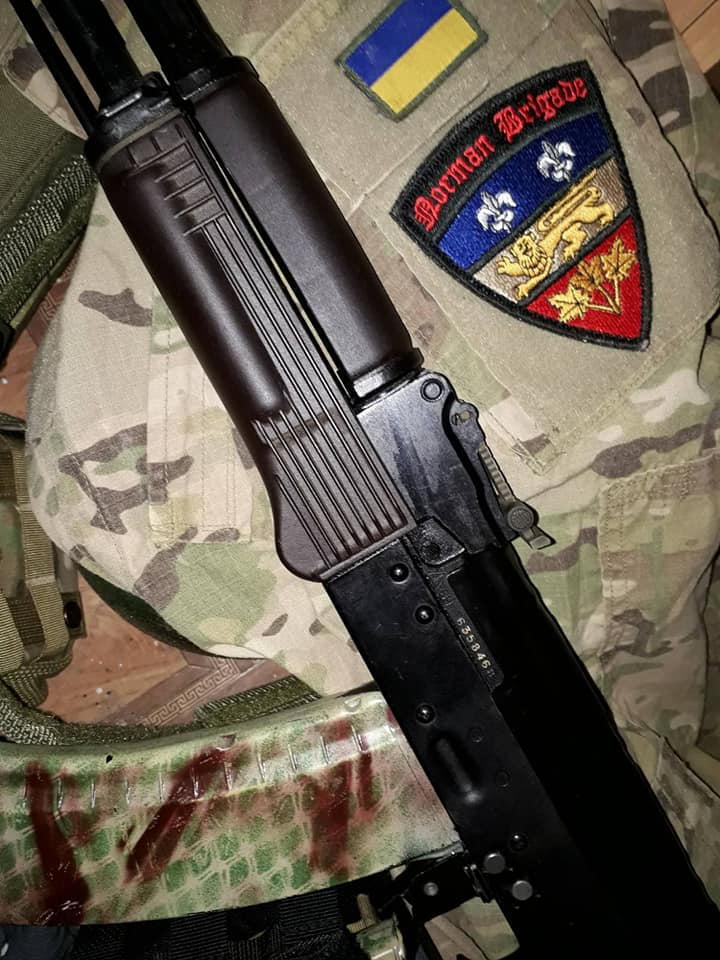
Chevron of the Norman Brigade.

=== Jean-Francois "Hrulf" Ratelle ===
Jean-Francois "Hrulf" Ratelle was a former reservist artilleryman of the Canadian Army from Joliette, Quebec who later joined the French Foreign Legion. In March 2024, it was reported that Hrulf had died from wounds received on a mission in the Belgorod region.

=== "Wali" ===
A former Canadian Army sniper from the Royal 22nd Regiment going by the nom de guerre "Wali", stated he connected with several other Canadian veterans as well as former British soldiers on their arrival in Poland, making their way to Ukraine to fight against the Russian invasion. He claimed the Norman Brigade was started as a humanitarian effort to deliver aid in Eastern Ukraine by a group of former Canadian soldiers. The sniper had left the brigade by May 2022 after "Hrulf" challenged him to a fist fight. Despite this, 'Wali' said of 'Hrulf' "I personally like the Norman Brigade commander... He is a good fighter and warrior…. We are all on the same side against Russians and that’s what matters the most.”

=== Joshua Jones ===
Joshua Jones, from the United States, was killed in action at the frontline while under the command of the International Legion of Territorial Defence of Ukraine. It was acknowledged that Joshua had died during a mission overseen by the Main Intelligence Directorate of Ukraine which involved taking a trench occupied by Russian forces. He briefly served in the Norman Brigade from April to June 2022. Social media posts mentioned that he embodied the "core values of a Norman" that were displayed on the battlefield.

=== Benjamin Stuart "Velcro" Reed ===
Benjamin Stuart Reed is an American writer and media personality from Newburyport, Massachusetts. He is a veteran of Operation Iraqi Freedom. According to a letter of recommendation written by Hrulf posted on social media, he served in the Norman Brigade for one month from May 2022 - June 2022, when he left with other members of the group for the International Legion of Territorial Defense of Ukraine. Reed was later interviewed by The New York Times reporter Thomas Gibbons-Neff in connection with reporting on alleged war crimes involving Chosen Company.

== See also ==
- Black Maple Company
- Canadian-Ukrainian Brigade
- International Legion.
