= Black Maple Company =

Canadian volunteer military unit in Ukraine

- Emblem of the Black Maple Company
- Founded: March 2022
- Allegiance: Ukraine
- Type: Foreign volunteer
- Role: Urban Warfare; Mine Clearance; Patrolling; Irregular warfare Reconnaissance; Special operations Intelligence
- Size: Unknown
- Part of: International Legion of the Defence Intelligence of Ukraine
- Garrison/HQ: Kyiv
- Motto(s): Memento Mori
- Engagements: Russian Invasion of Ukraine: Battle of Kyiv; Battle of Bakhmut; 2023 Ukrainian counteroffensive
- Website: blackmaplecompany.ca

The Black Maple Company is a multinational volunteer unit fighting in the 2022 Russian invasion of Ukraine. The Black Maple Company was founded in March 2022 and was formed by veterans and volunteers from Canada. It is attached to the International Legion of the Defence Intelligence of Ukraine.

== History ==
The company was created around early March 2022, as a reaction to the announcement by Ukrainian President Volodymyr Zelenskyy that an international fighting force would be created to help defend Ukrainian independence against the Russian invasion. Two soldiers of the company, one who goes by the callsign "Speedy" and one who goes by the callsign "Tanto" were interviewed by CTV National News on 26 February 2023. Tanto, said he decided to come to Ukraine after seeing videos of children on the crossing the Ukraine-Polish border with only a passport and a teddy bear. As for Speedy, he felt it was his duty, saying, “I wanted to help fight, help the population.”

Speedy and Tanto, and a third French-Canadian, Francis Dion (callsign "Shadow"), later launched Black Maple Company's website where people can purchase merchandise with the unit's insignia, a Skull with a combat knife through its head with two AK style rifles behind it. On the magazines of the rifles is the company's motto: "Memento Mori" which is a Latin phrase meaning "remember you must die". Part of the proceeds will go toward helping their fellow fighters injured in battle and for fundraising for the unit. The company has been involved in the Battle of Kyiv, the Battle of Bakhmut, and the 2023 Ukrainian Counteroffensive.

On 13 May 2024, the unit's co-founder "Speedy" was awarded the medal "For courage in performing special tasks" for his actions during the 2023 Ukrainian counteroffensive.

== Equipment ==
The company uses C7 rifles.
