= Cuba–Ukraine relations =

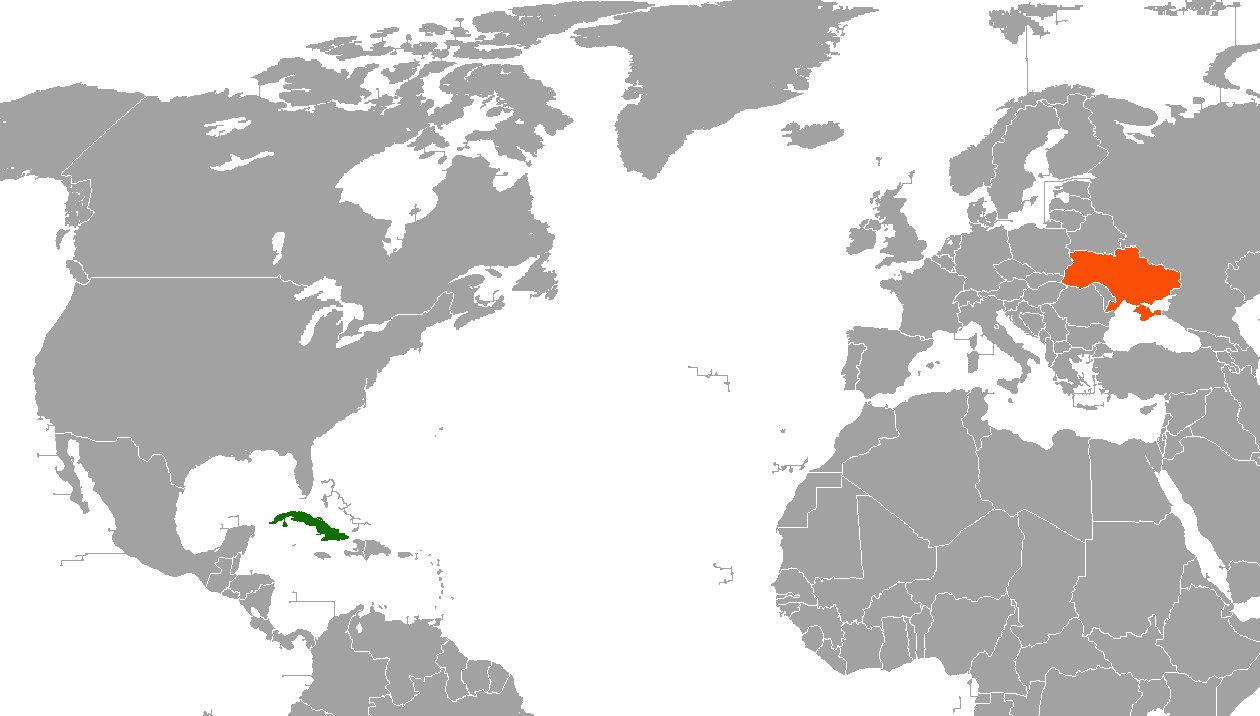

- Cuba: Ukraine

Cuba–Ukraine relations refers to bilateral relations between the Republic of Cuba and Ukraine. Both countries established relations on 12 March 1992. Both countries' foreign relations have been impacted by their respective relationships with Russia and the previous Soviet Union.

== History ==
The Embassy of Ukraine in Havana was opened in September 1993. The Consulate General of Cuba in Ukraine acquired the status of an embassy in 1992. Since 2020, the Ambassador of the Republic of Cuba to Ukraine is Natacha Diaz Aguilera.

=== Relations since 2014 ===
Relations between the two countries began to decline following the beginning of the Russo-Ukrainian war. Cuba voted against Resolution No. 68/262 of March 27, 2014, “Territorial Integrity of Ukraine,” adopted by the UN General Assembly, as well as against resolutions adopted in support of Ukraine by the UN Human Rights Council (2014) and UNESCO (2014 and 2015).

Following the beginning of the Russian invasion of Ukraine in 2022, from 5,000 to 7,000 Cuban nationals were reported to have been recruited by the Russian Armed Forces as mercenaries for the invasion, which the Cuban government denied. In July 2025, a report from El Pais estimated as many as 20,000 Cubans had been recruited into the Russian Army since 2022, with around 200-300 killed. According to Verkhovna Rada member Maryan Zablotskyy, up to 40% of volunteers were part of the Cuban Armed Forces. Cuba also abstained from voting on General Assembly resolutions demanding Russia's withdrawal of forces from Ukraine. First Secretary of the Communist Party of Cuba Miguel Díaz-Canel praised Vladimir Putin's support for Cuba and blamed the United States for provoking the invasion.

In response, in October 2025, the Ukrainian government closed its embassy in Havana and downgraded its relations with the Cuban government, and additionally voted against an annual United Nations General Assembly resolution against the United States embargo against Cuba, marking the country's first vote supporting the embargo since the General Assembly began passing such resolutions in 1994. Later in July 2026, Ukraine voted against a Cuban proposal to reopen debate on the U.S. embargo against Cuba at the United Nations General Assembly, making it one of nine countries to vote against the proposal, alongside the United States, Argentina, Costa Rica, Czech Republic, Israel, Morocco, North Macedonia, and Paraguay.
