= Oleh Kutsyn =

Ukrainian public, political and military figure of Ukraine (1965–2022)

- Олег Іванович Куцин
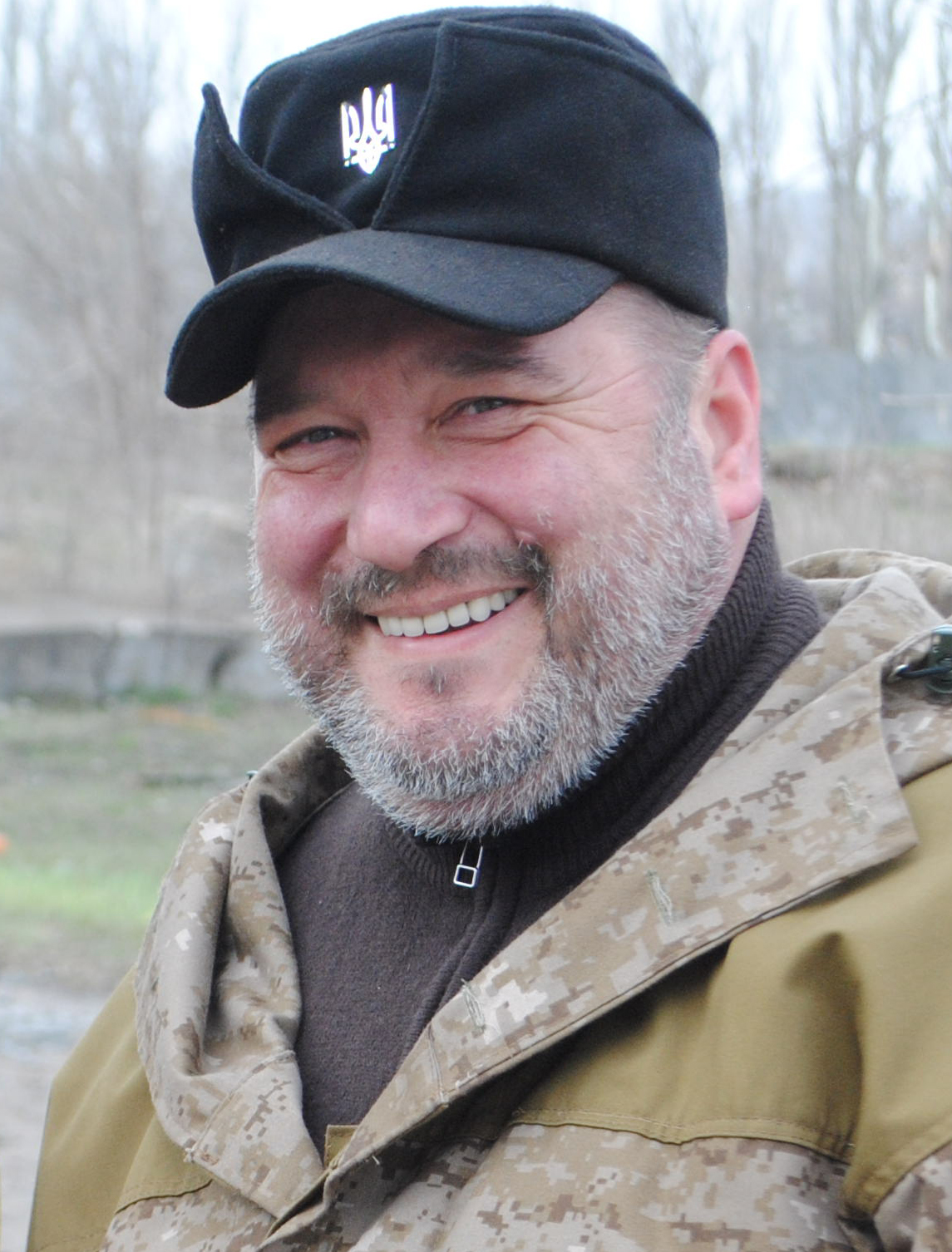
- Born: Oleg Ivanovich Kutsyn; 23 November 1965; Ivano-Frankivsk, Soviet Union
- Died: 19 June 2022 (aged 56); Kharkiv Oblast, Ukraine
- Military career
- Allegiance: Ukraine
- Branch: Ukrainian Ground Forces
- Service years: 2014–2022
- Rank: Sub-lieutenant
- Units: 93rd Mechanized Brigade; National Guard of Ukraine; 49th Rifle Battalion
- Conflicts: Russo-Ukrainian War; War in Donbas; Russian invasion of Ukraine; Battle of Donbas †

Oleh Ivanovych Kutsyn (Ukrainian: Олег Іванович Куцин; 23 November 1965 – 19 June 2022) was a Ukrainian public, political and military figure who was head of the "Legion of Freedom" of the Svoboda party. He was also commander of the 49th Infantry Battalion (commonly known as the Carpathian Sich Battalion), deputy head of the Tiachiv district state administration (2005–2006), and twice elected as a deputy of the Tiachiv City Council.

== Biography ==
Oleh Kutsyn was born on 23 November 1965 in the city of Ivano-Frankivsk, where his parents were studying at that time. He graduated from Tiachiv Secondary School No. 1, now Secondary School No. 1 named after Vasyl Grenji-Donsky.

From 2005 to 2006, he was the first deputy head of the Tiachiv District State Administration.

== Political activity ==
In 1989, Oleh Kutsyn joined the "People's Movement of Ukraine". On 4 October 1989, despite the strict ban by the communists, the Flag of Ukraine was hoisted for the first time in his native Tiachiv. It happened during the founding meeting of the Tiachiv district organization of the Movement.

Since 2014, he created the Carpathian Sich Battalion to fight in the war in Donbas. He later created the "Legion of Freedom", another Ukrainian volunteer battalion in the Donbas.

In March 2017, the Investigative Committee of Russia instituted criminal proceedings against Oleh Kutsyn for shelling in Donbas.

Kutsyn was wounded in December, during the Second Battle of Donetsk Airport near the village of Pisky.

Oleh Kutsyn died fighting Russian forces during the battle of Izium in June 2022.
