= 49th Assault Battalion (Ukraine) =

Military unit

49th Assault Battalion (since 2023) 49th Infantry Battalion (2022–2023) Carpathian Sich Detachment (2014–2022)
- 49-й штурмовий батальйон
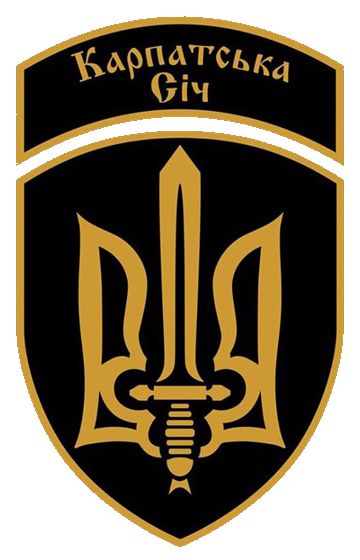
- Active: 2014–2016; 2022–present
- Country: Ukraine
- Allegiance: Armed Forces of Ukraine
- Branch: Ukrainian Ground Forces
- Type: Assault Forces
- Size: Battalion
- Part of: Joint Rapid Response Forces Command: Russo-Ukrainian War; War in Donbas; Second Battle of Donetsk Airport; Battle of Debaltseve; Battle of Marinka (2015); Russian invasion of Ukraine; Battle of Irpin; Battle of Bucha; Battle of Kyiv (2022); Battle of Brovary; Battle of Izium (2022); Battle of the Svatove–Kreminna line
- Nickname: Carpathian Sich Battalion

Commanders
- Current commander: Major Yevhen Skoryna
- Notable commanders: Oleh Kutsyn

Insignia
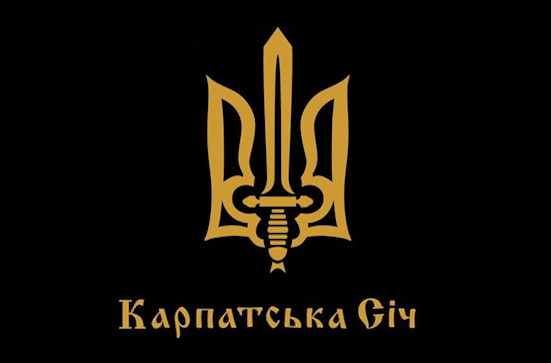
- Flag

The 49th Separate Assault Battalion "Carpathian Sich " (Note: Ukrainian: 49-й штурмовий батальйон «Карпатська Січ», romanized: 49-i okremyi pikhotnyi batalion «Karpatska Sich»)) (Note: Formerly known as the 49th Rifle Battalion. (Note: Ukrainian: 49-й окремий стрілецький батальйон, romanized: 49-i okremyi striletskyi batalion) Informally known as the Carpathian Sich Separate Volunteer Battalion (Note: Ukrainian: окрема добровольча чота «Карпатська Січ», romanized: okrema dobrovolcha chota «Karpatska Sich») or the "Carpathian Sich" Battalion. (Note: Ukrainian: Батальйон «Карпатська Січ», romanized: Batalion «Karpatska Sich»)) is a unit of the Ukrainian Ground Forces established in May 2022. It previously existed from 2014 to 2016.

== History ==
Following the beginning of the war in Donbas, Oleh Kutsyn organised a group of volunteers dedicated to providing aid to Ukrainian soldiers. In the summer of 2014, the volunteers joined the National Guard of Ukraine. On 23 May 2015, they officially became part of the Armed Forces of Ukraine. The same year, they participated in the Second Battle of Donetsk Airport, the Battle of Debaltseve, and the Battle of Marinka.

However, on 13 April 2016, the Carpathian Sich Battalion was disbanded. Kutsyn claimed he had been deceived by the leadership of the 93rd Mechanised Brigade, which it had subordinated itself to under the condition that it was permitted to remain in the Donbas. The General Staff of the Ukrainian Armed Forces disputed this, saying the volunteer battalion had been dissolved to bring the Armed Forces of Ukraine up to the standards of NATO, and that Carpathian Sich Battalion members had been given the offer to join other units.

=== 2022 Russian invasion of Ukraine ===
Following the beginning of the 2022 Russian invasion of Ukraine, Kutsyn re-founded the battalion with other former members. The new battalion fought in Kyiv Oblast, at the battles of Irpin, Bucha, Kyiv, and Brovary.

On 4 April 2022, two Czech volunteers of the Battalion were arrested by Police officers after they had looted houses in Kyiv Oblast. According to the battalion's lawyer, Olena Rozvadovska, what the two Czechs had looted included women's and children's jewelry, and up to half a kilogram of silver and gold. On 6 August 2024, Filip Siman, one of the two Czech volunteers, was sentenced by a Czech court to 7 years in prison for looting.

Following the successful repulsion of the Russian offensive on Kyiv by Ukrainian forces, the battalion again became an official part of the Ukrainian Armed Forces on 19 May 2022. It was then sent to the eastern theatre of the war, where it fought on the Izium front. There, Kutsyn was killed by Russian forces on 19 June 2022. The battalion is currently commanded by a 58-year old, formerly retired career soldier, who uses the code name Swat.

During the Ukrainian Kharkiv counteroffensive, the battalion was on the forefront of the fighting at Izium and Lyman, both strategically important cities, to provide flanking support. On 10 September 2022, the battalion advanced from its positions in the village of Virnopillia towards Izium. In the village of Topolske, just south of Izium, units of the battalion captured members of Russia's 423rd Motor Rifle Regiment.

On October 3, 2022, they seized an additional settlement to the east, secured a series of dams, and more settlements in northern Donetsk province.

As of 4 January 2023, the battalion was deployed on the Luhansk Oblast front, near the city of Kreminna.

In April 2024, Captain Yevhen Skoryna of Karpatska Sich received the "Gold Star" and "Combat Merit Cross" from President Zelensky for participating in the defense of Kyiv, Kharkiv, Donetsk, and Luhansk regions.

== Structure ==
- 49th Infantry Battalion
  - Unit Headquarters
    - German Volunteer Corps
    - 1st Assault Company
    - 2nd Assault Company "White Demons"
    - 3rd Assault Company
    - 4th Assault Company
    - 5th Assault Company
    - Reconnaissance Company
    - Tank Company
    - Fire Support Company

== See also ==
- Tseng Sheng-guang, a deceased Taiwanese soldier of the 49th Infantry Battalion.
