= German Volunteer Corps =

German volunteer unit in Ukraine (2023–present)

- Німецький Добровольчий Корпус; Nimetsʹkyy Dobrovolʹchyy Korpus; Deutsches Freiwilligen Korps
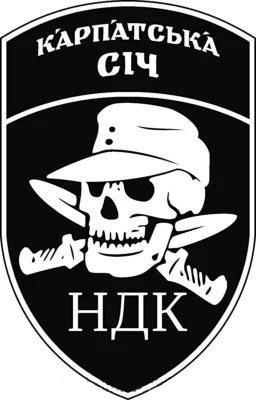
- Unit chevron
- Active: 2023 – present
- Country: Ukraine
- Branch: International Legion of the Defence Intelligence of Ukraine (until 2025); 49th Infantry Battalion (since 2025)
- Type: Foreign volunteer unit
- Role: Light infantry
- Size: ~100
- Motto: Always Faithful
- Engagements: Russo-Ukrainian War; Russian invasion of Ukraine; Eastern Ukraine campaign; Battle of Avdiivka; 2023 Belgorod incursions; 2024 Western Russia incursion

Commanders
- Current commander: "Stepan"

Insignia
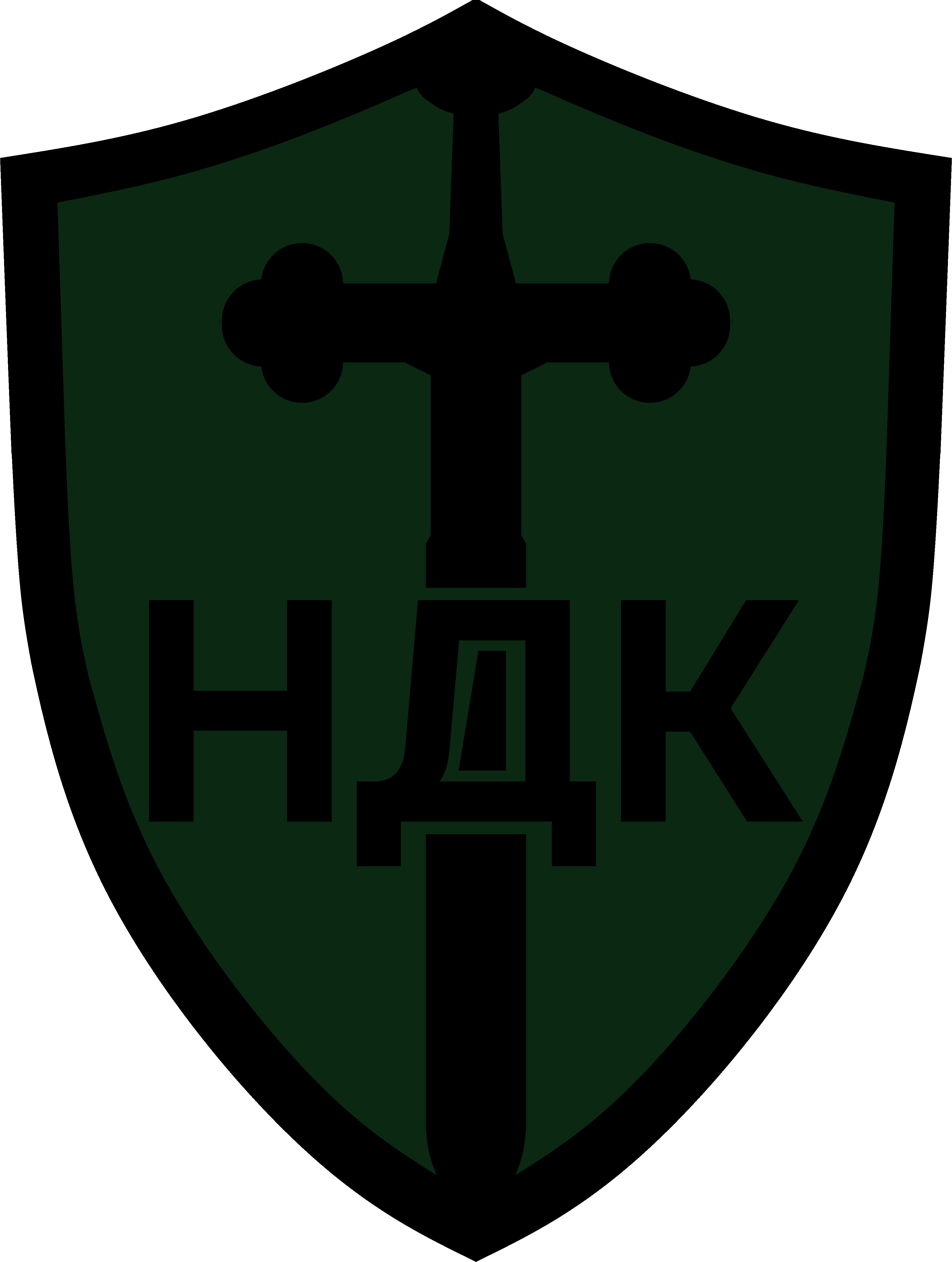
- Logo (until 2025)

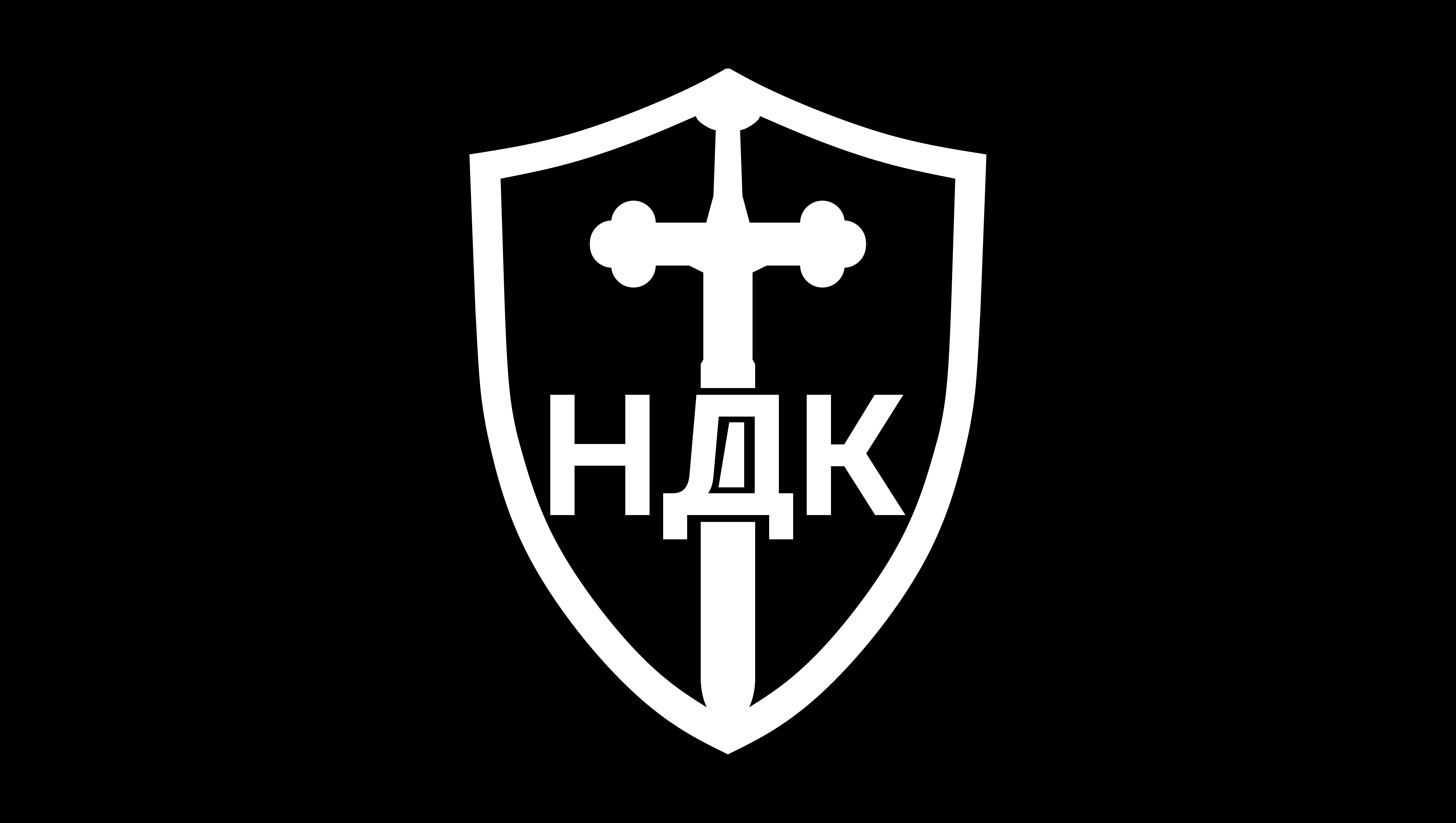
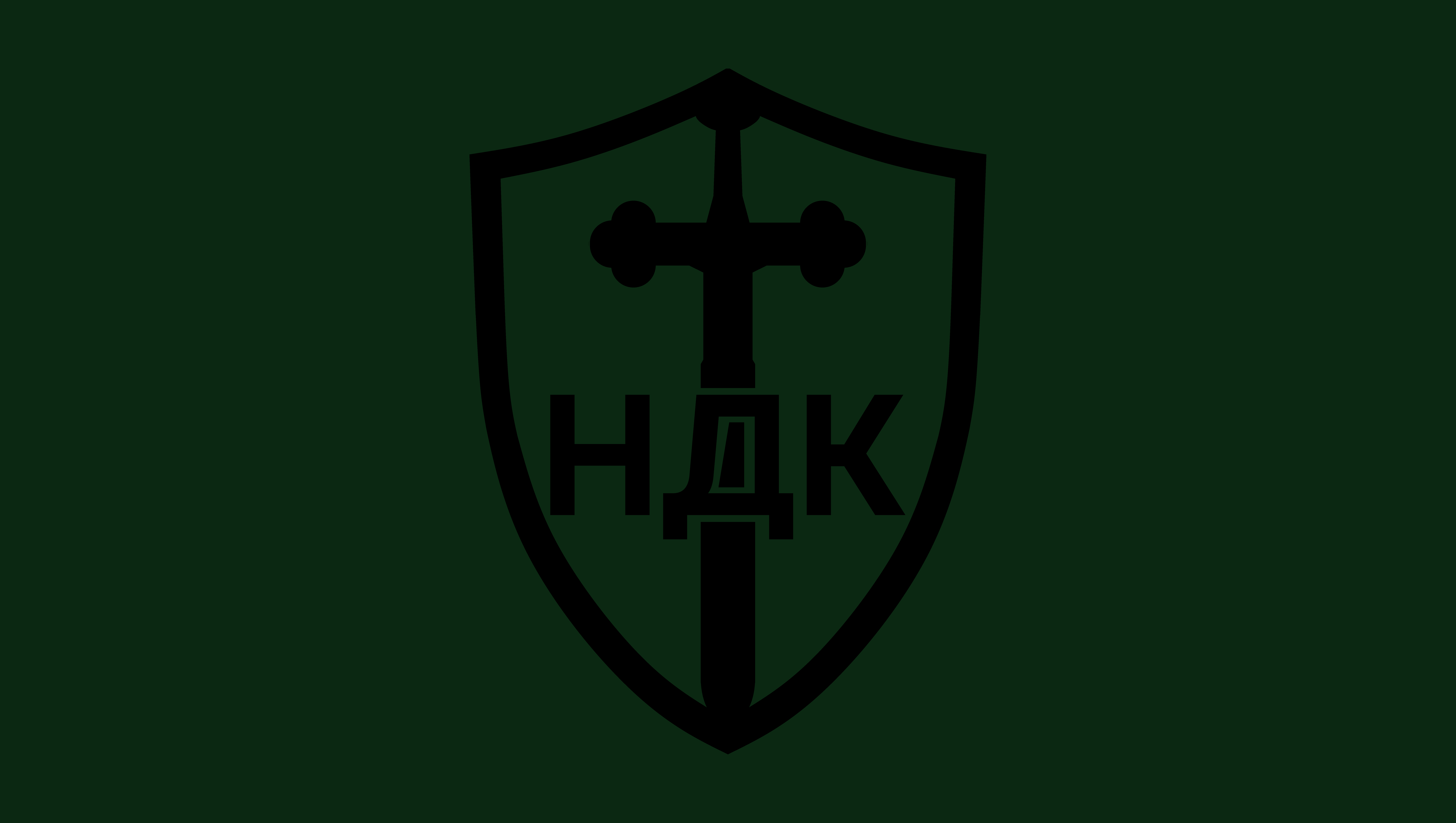
- Flags

The German Volunteer Corps (Ukrainian: Німецький Добровольчий Корпус, romanized: Nimetsʹkyy Dobrovolʹchyy Korpus German: Deutsches Freiwilligenkorps) is a volunteer unit composed of German national volunteers, part of the Main Directorate of Intelligence of Ukraine. The unit has coordinated with various other Ukrainian military units under the Main Directorate of Intelligence of Ukraine, such as the Russian Volunteer Corps, the Free Russia Legion, and the Polish Volunteer Corps in Ukraine. The organization was incorporated into the 49th Infantry Battalion in April 2025.

== History ==
=== Background ===
Since the outbreak of the Russian invasion of Ukraine on 24 February 2022, many German nationals have travelled to Ukraine to fight for both Russia and Ukraine. Many of these, reportedly by the Federal Ministry of the Interior, have been affiliated with left and right-wing extremism. According to a report by German news outlet Welt, approximately 39 people left Germany with the intention of participating in the conflict. 27 of these people were reportedly pro-Russian, and the remaining 12 were pro-Ukrainian. Additionally, it was also said that German authorities had significant proof of the majority of these people participating in combat.

Other German nationals, unaffiliated with extremism have also joined the conflict. There have been a number of ex-soldiers, notably some being ex-servicemen from the German Bundeswehr, who have joined other structures within the Ukrainian Armed Forces such as the International Legion - belonging to the Territorial Defense Forces.

=== Formation ===
It was reported by Militant Wire that the German Volunteer Corps was formed in June 2023, being within the structure of the Russian Volunteer Corps which trains, organises, and endorses them also. The unit was formed on the basis by German nationals as well as external help from the Russian Volunteer Corps.

The unit, alongside the Russian Volunteer Corps for which they fight in cooperation with, has fought in several hotspots along the frontline during the invasion - notably in areas such as Avdiivka which fell to Russian forces in late February 2024. In April 2025, the GVC was incorporated into the 49th Infantry Battalion.

== Relations and allies ==
The unit has a significant relation to units affiliated within the Russian Volunteer Corps, due to German Volunteer Corps being part of its structure. RAND Corporation have also confirmed the cooperation between several volunteer units in Ukraine, notably the Russian, Polish and German volunteer corps.

== Extremism ==
The Terrorism Research and Analysis Consortium reported that the German Volunteer Corps was considered as a "right-wing extremist group", most likely due to its affiliation and endorsement of extremist ideas and ideologies alongside the Russian Volunteer Corps.

== See also ==
- Attacks in Russia during the Russian invasion of Ukraine
- Denis Kapustin
