= Imam Shamil Dagestan Battalion (Ukraine) =

Imam Shamil Battalion
- Батальйон імені імама Шаміля (Ukrainian)
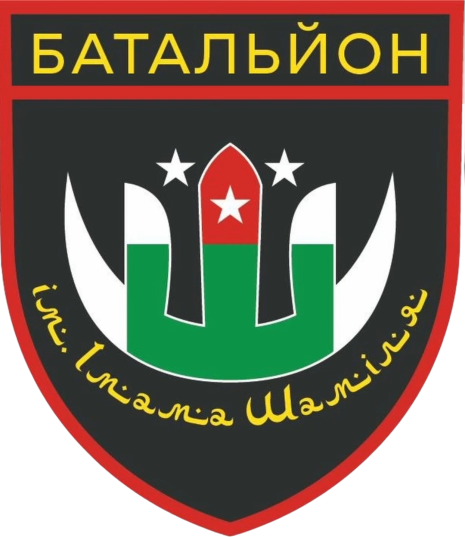
- Battalion Insignia
- Founded: 2022
- Country: Ukraine
- Allegiance: Dagestani Opposition; Ministry of Defence (Ukraine)
- Branch: Ukrainian Ground Forces
- Type: Battalion
- Size: Several hundred
- Part of: International Legion of the Defence Intelligence of Ukraine
- Nickname: Dagestan Liberation Battalion
- Patron: Imam Shamil
- Engagements: 2022 Russian invasion of Ukraine: Donetsk Oblast Campaign; Battle of Bakhmut; Insurgency in the North Caucasus: 2022 North Caucasian protests

Commanders
- Current commander: Saipulaev Muhammad Ibrahimovich

Insignia
- Flag

The Imam Shamil Dagestan Volunteer Battalion is a volunteer combat unit operating under the command of the Armed Forces of Ukraine as a part of the International Legion of the Armed Forces of Ukraine against the Russian forces. It mainly consists of volunteers from Dagestan which seek an independent Dagestan from Russian rule. It was established in October 2022 after Russian invasion of Ukraine and is named after the national hero of Dagestan, Imam Shamil.

== History ==
The battalion was officially established in the beginning of October 2022 during the Russian invasion of Ukraine as a part of the International Legion for the Territorial Defense of Ukraine. It was created by the public-political organization "Dagestan National Center", which consists of members of the Dagestan diaspora in Ukraine, its stated goal is to help Ukraine win the war against Russia and liberate Dagestan from Russian rule. The association "For a free Caucasus", an affiliate of the Free Nations of Post-Russia Forum is also related to the battalion's creation.

The battalion is mainly composed of Dagestanis who previously fought as part of various formations of the Armed Forces of Ukraine, the Dagestani soldiers from the Krym Battalion and volunteers, which were united into a single Dagestani battalion under the command of Muhammad Saipulaev.

The battalion along with Morning Dagestan and Adat People's Movement acted as the initiators and coordinators of the 2022 North Caucasian protests.

"We started the fight against Russia long before that, 10-15 years ago. In Ukraine, they decided to continue, because what has affected us for 100 years has now affected [Ukraine]"

Following the conclusion of the Russo-Ukrainian war, the battalion aims to work for the liberation of an independent Dagestan from Russian imperialism.

In December 2022, according the battalion was fighting in the Donetsk Oblast along with the "Brotherhood" battalion

In March 2023, the battalion also saw combat during the Battle of Bakhmut along with other volunteer formations.

== Commanders ==
- Saipulaev Muhammad Ibrahimovich (2022-)

== Sources ==
- Батальон имени имама Шамиля выступит в войне на стороне Украины
- В Украине создан батальон дагестанцев имени Имама Шамиля
- За Украину приехали воевать граждане Дагестана
