= Jerzy Tyc =

Polish pro-Russian activist (1967–2025)

- Born: 24 November 1967; Poland
- Died: Uncertain date in the summer of 2025
- Cause of death: Killed in action
- Military career
- Allegiance: Polish People's Republic; Russia
- Branch: Army
- Service years: c. 1985–1989; 2025
- Conflicts: Russian Invasion of Ukraine

Jerzy Tyc (24 November 1967 – summer 2025) was a Polish pro-Russian activist and soldier. He was the founder of the Kursk Association, which was dedicated to preserving and restoring Soviet war monuments and military cemeteries in Poland. He died fighting as a volunteer in the Russian Armed Forces during the Russo-Ukrainian War, where he served under the callsign "Zygmunt".

== Life and career prior to activism ==
Jerzy Tyc was born on 24 November 1967 in Poland. According to Tyc, his mother, Helena Tyc, was saved by a Soviet soldier during the winter of 1945 when she was 13 years old. The soldier pulled her from a burning house that had been set on fire by retreating German forces. Tyc grew up in the village of Surmówka in northern Poland, where he and his younger brother Adam, one of his five siblings, ran a farm and kept bees. As children, Tyc and his friends would dress up as Red Army soldiers and play war.

Tyc graduated from military school and served as an artillery non-commissioned officer in the Polish Armed Forces, commanding a platoon until 1989, when he left military service during Poland's democratic transition. He later stated that he was proud never to have served in NATO. After leaving the military, Tyc worked as a police officer and later became co-owner of a construction company while also engaging in farming activities.

== Activism in Poland ==
In 2008, Tyc founded the Kursk Association (Polish: Stowarzyszenie Kursk), naming it after Kursk, the site of the largest World War II tank battle. According to Tyc, the organisation's mission was to restore and preserve Soviet war memorials and military cemeteries in Poland that had fallen into disrepair or abandonment. Tyc began by attempting to repair abandoned Cold War bunkers near Katowice. Over the following decade, the association restored more than 40 Red Army monuments across Poland, with Tyc securing donations from Russian organisations and government-affiliated charities.

Starting in 2016, Tyc began travelling regularly to Moscow to meet with sponsors and Russian veterans' associations. In October 2016, he visited a museum near Moscow where he was received by Maria Zakharova, the spokesperson for Russia's Foreign Ministry. During this period, he began making regular appearances in Russian state media. According to The Guardian in 2018, Tyc was portrayed "as an ordinary Pole fighting historical revisionism in the face of an uncompromising government". His activism was used by Russian state propaganda to promote state-sanctioned narratives regarding the Soviet treatment of Poland during World War II.

In 2016, Russian television journalist Anna Zakharian contacted Tyc for help locating the grave of her grandfather went missing in action after fighting in Poland during World War II. Following this, she and Tyc began an intimate relationship, and Zakharyan became Kursk Association's Russian representative. Zakharyan, then married to Tyc, would be detained in 2018 by the Polish Internal Security Agency on allegations of posing a threat to Poland's security and making "arrangements for espionage activities"; she was deported.

In 2017, the association restored the Soviet monument in the Polish village of Mikolín. The monument was dedicated to soldiers of the 1st Ukrainian Front who died during the Oder crossing in January 1945. Renovations took two years and cost 20,000 złoty (£4,000). The effort was supported by Russian and pro-Russian organisations and activists from Kaliningrad who organised internet fundraising campaigns. The renovated monument was unveiled on 22 June 2017, the 76th anniversary of Hitler's invasion of the Soviet Union, with members of the Russian diplomatic mission in attendance, whereas Polish officials declined participation. Said date coincided with the passing of the Polish decommunisation law at the initiative of the Law and Justice party, aimed at demolishing Soviet monuments. The monument became subject to demands for removal under a pending amendment to the law aimed at eliminating communist symbols from public spaces; it lacked inscriptions in Polish language, a legal requirement. A subsequent project of the association was the renovation of a military cemetery in Proszowice, containing the remains of more than 600 Red Army personnel.

== Move to Russia, volunteering in the war, and death ==
In May 2020, Russian Defense Minister Sergei Shoigu awarded Tyc the Medal "In Memory of the Heroes of the Fatherland" for his "high achievements in the field of military history development, humanitarian knowledge and implementation of important public projects of historical and patriotic orientation". The Russkiy Mir Foundation (a Russian government-organised non-governmental organisation founded by Vladimir Putin's decree) published a profile of Tyc in 2020.

At some point, Tyc moved to Russia. There he joined the Russian Historical Society. (Note: whose president was Sergey Naryshkin, director of the Foreign Intelligence Service) In this capacity he was spreading information about the Polish Army in the USSR, and he accused the Polish government of "attempts to falsify history". In 2025, he joined the Russian military as a volunteer to fight in the Russo-Ukrainian War, adopting the callsign "Zygmunt" in honour of the Polish general Zygmunt Berling.

The first public information about Tyc's death came in the form of an unverified report by Nasha Versia on 11 September 2025, stating that he died in Eastern Ukraine. Russian authorities and media confirmed his death ten days later. According to a Russian Telegram channel, he went missing in action in Eastern Ukraine in June, and his remains were discovered in September.

== See also ==
- Tomasz Szmydt – Polish jurist
