= Bratislav Živković (soldier) =

Serbian mercenary (1975–2025)

- Братислав Живковић
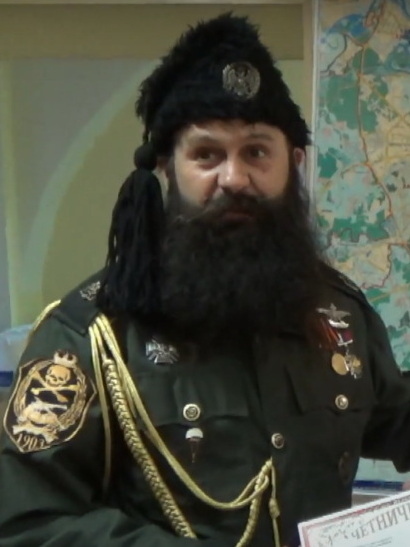
- Živković in 2015
- Born: 12 November 1975; Kruševac, SR Serbia, SFR Yugoslavia
- Died: 3 January 2025 (aged 49); Kursk Oblast, Russia
- Military career
- Allegiance: Luhansk People's Republic; Russia
- Branch: Russian Army
- Service years: 2014–2025
- Unit: Chetniks
- Conflicts: Russo-Ukrainian War; Annexation of Crimea by the Russian Federation; War in Donbas; Russian invasion of Ukraine; Kursk front †

Bratislav Živković (Serbian: Братислав Живковић; 12 November 1975 – 3 January 2025) was a Serbian volunteer in the Russian Army leading a contingent of fellow Serbs against Ukraine.

== Biography ==
In 2012, Živković was among a group of Serbian nationalists who erected barricades in North Kosovo to prevent Kosovar authorities from reaching Serb municipalities.

Živković was the commander of a Serbian Chetnik group that participated as part of the little green men that invaded and annexed Crimea for Russia claiming a shared Orthodox faith and respect for Russia, as well as receiving a hefty financial reward. During the annexation his Chetniks manned checkpoints alongside Russian Cossack formations. He later served as a "Russian Separatist" during the War in Donbas as part of the "Unité Continentale" foreign volunteer unit within the Luhansk People’s Republic.

In 2015, Živković attempted to smuggle a group of his Chetniks into northern Macedonia to participate in anti-Albanian fighting in Kumanovo but was detained at the border.

Živković was banned from Montenegro in 2015 due to his participation in the Russian war effort. Živković has also been banned from Bosnia and Herzegovina in 2017 for his participation in the Russian war effort. In 2017 Živković was detained in Romania and eventually expelled from the country, and barred from setting foot in any NATO country on charges of Russian espionage. The Romanian Intelligence Service stated that Živković was "showing interest in obtaining classified documents on critical infrastructure and national and allied military objectives located in south-east Romania with the intention of affecting our strategic partnerships." In 2017 he visited the port city of Constanța four separate times and was caught photographing military radars and the Mihail Kogălniceanu airbase. Živković was arrested in Serbia in 2018 for "organising participation in a war or armed conflict in a foreign country", namely for his involvement in the Russian annexation of Crimea and the War in the Donbas. In February of that year another 28 members of his Chetnik organization were convicted in Belgrade of the same offense.

Živković and his Chetniks were active participants of the Russo-Ukrainian war. He was seriously injured in the opening phase of the conflict, and was later killed by Ukrainian forces during the Kursk incursion on 3 January 2025. Živković was 49.
