= Belarusian involvement in the Russo-Ukrainian war (2022–present) =

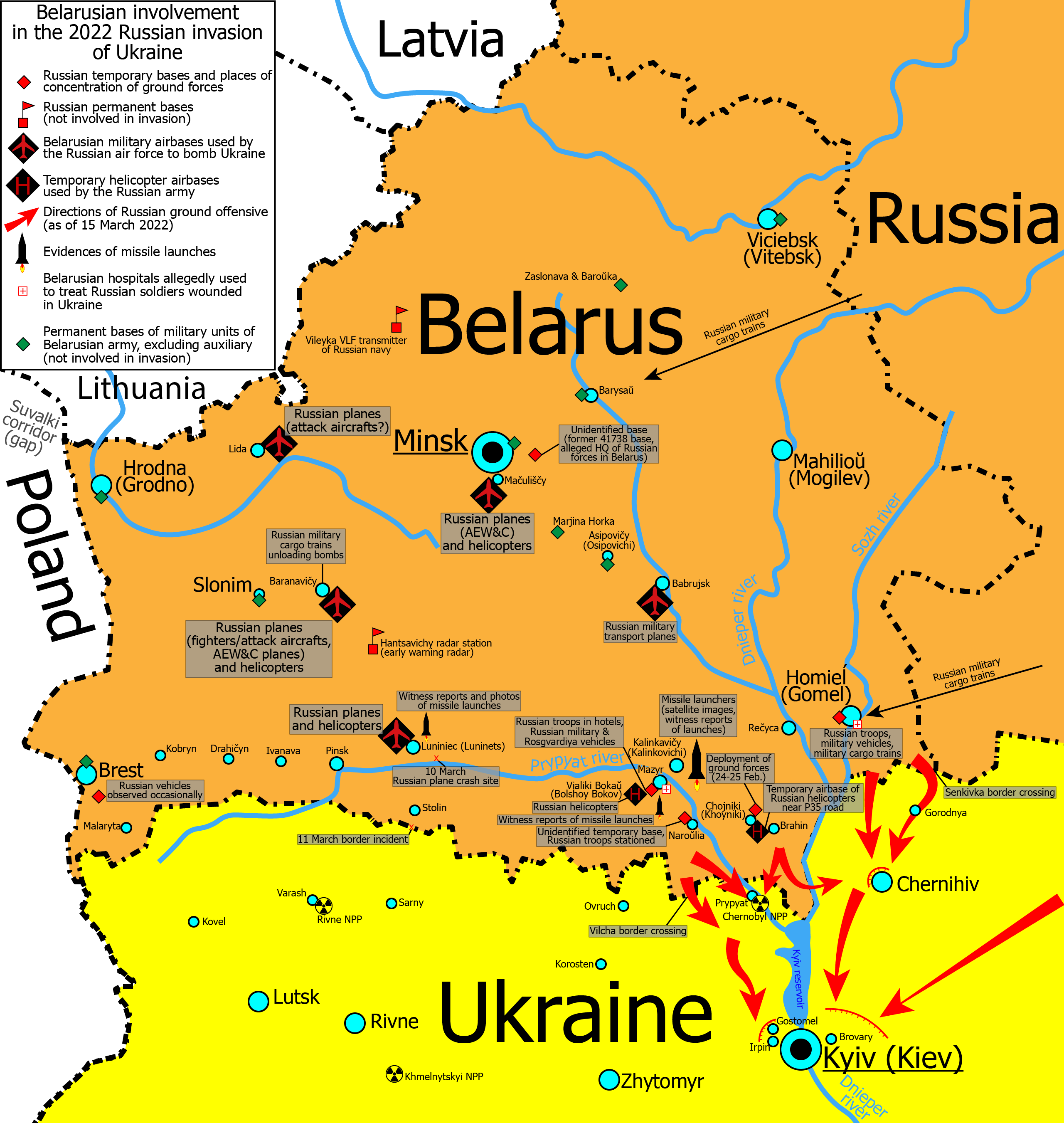
Map of Russian military activities in Belarus as of 15 March 2022

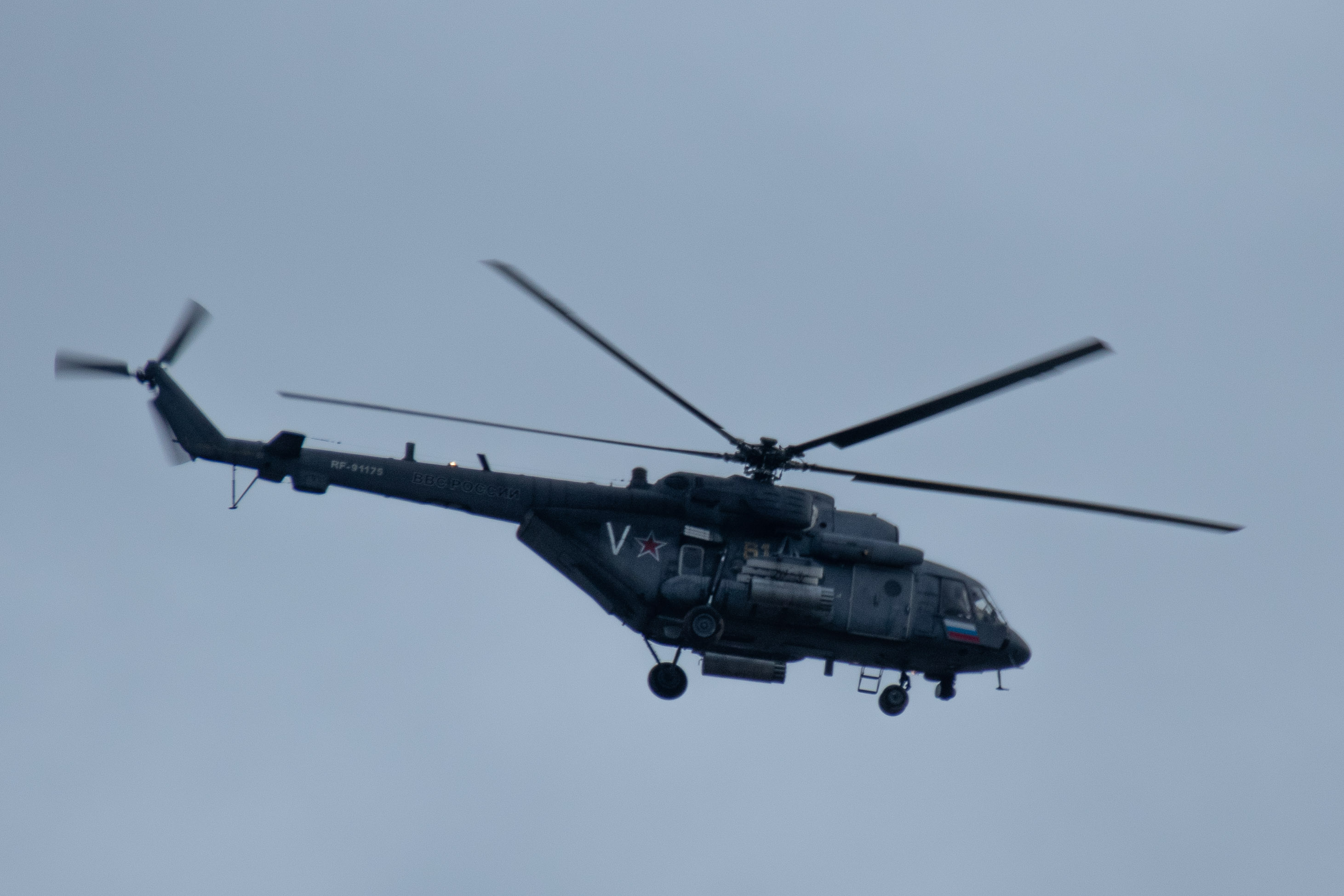
Russian Mil Mi-8AMTSh (Mi-171Sh) helicopter in Minsk, 23 February 2022

Belarus, a close ally and a member of the Union State with Russia, has supported its eastern neighbour in the Russo-Ukrainian war. Before the start of the offensive, Belarus allowed the Russian Armed Forces to perform weeks-long military drills on its territory; however, the Russian troops did not exit the country after they were supposed to finish. Belarus allowed Russia to stage part of the invasion from its territory, giving Russia the shortest possible land route to Ukraine's capital, Kyiv. However, these forces withdrew within two months, thus ceasing land-based military operations originating from Belarus and resulting in the recapture of the Ukrainian side of the border region by Ukraine. Despite this, the situation along the border remains tense, with Ukraine closing the border checkpoints leading into Belarus, bar special cases.

Belarus has also allowed Russian missile launchers to be stationed on its territory and shoot at Ukrainian targets. Several reports emerged among the Belarusian opposition and Ukrainian military that Belarusian troops were in Ukraine fighting together with Russians, but Belarus's leader Aleksander Lukashenko dismissed them and said that the Belarusian Armed Forces (BAF) would not participate directly in the conflict. As of early 2023, the BAF have not been involved in fighting against Ukraine and have remained on the territory of Belarus during the entire course of the conflict. The Belarusian leader has stated that there would be "no way" he would send soldiers into Ukraine unless attacked first.

According to the Ukrainian foreign ministry, Lukashenko assured Ukrainian president Volodymyr Zelenskyy at the start of the invasion that he would not involve his nation's armed forces on the side of Russia. The former stated in early 2023 that Ukraine had offered to formalize this arrangement with a non-aggression pact. In the early days of the invasion, Belarus was also involved in peace initiatives, holding Russo-Ukrainian talks on its border. Despite some preliminary agreements, however, the talks did not result in a lasting ceasefire.

The involvement of Belarus was condemned in Western countries, with the European Union, the United States, United Kingdom, Canada, and Japan imposing sanctions against Belarus. According to Chatham House, Belarus's participation in the military conflict is unpopular among the general population; protests were held on 27 February, the day of the constitutional referendum which asked to revoke Belarus's non-nuclear country status, but were quickly dispersed. Hackers have targeted Belarusian government agencies as well as the country's critical infrastructure, with the aim of disrupting the Russian war effort in Belarus. Several analysts, including legal scholars, have concluded that Belarus's actions makes it complicit in the war according to the United Nations definition of aggression.

== Background ==
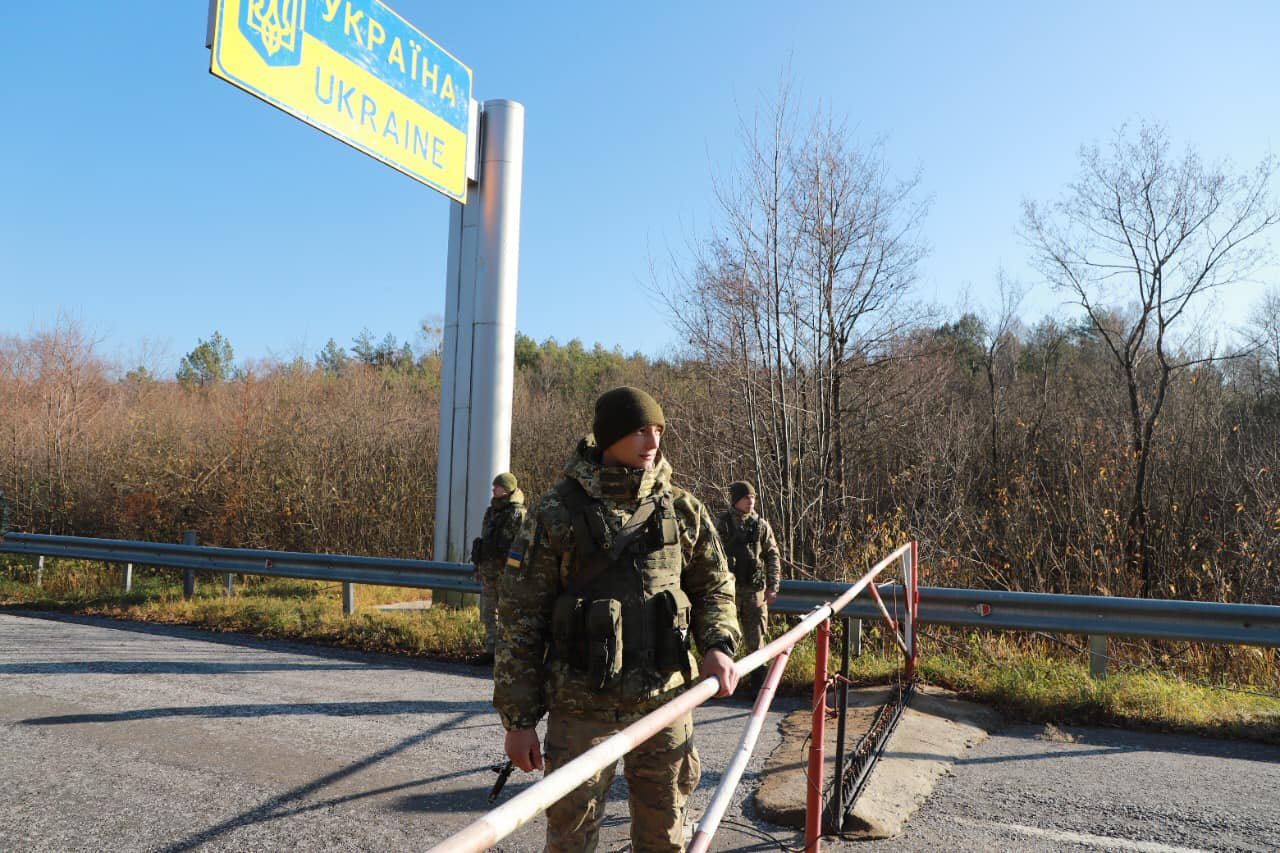
Ukrainian border guardsmen at the international border with Belarus in December 2021.

Belarus is located to the north of Ukraine, with which it shares a 1,084 km (674 mi)-long border. Its proximity to the Ukrainian capital Kyiv is considered to be of major strategic value. Both modern states were created in the aftermath of the October Revolution in 1917 in the form of the Belarusian Democratic Republic and the Ukrainian People's Republic, which following Soviet conquest of these territories were reestablished as the Byelorussian and Ukrainian SSRs in 1919 before unifying with Soviet Russia to form the Soviet Union in 1922. The current borders were established after World War II when the Soviet Union acquired western parts of Belarus and Ukraine from interwar Poland and Hungary and have remained the same since, even once the two republics became independent countries in 1991 with the dissolution of the Soviet Union.

In January and February 2022, Russian troops came into Belarus to participate in military drills. On 16 February, Minister of Foreign Affairs Vladimir Makei claimed that Russian soldiers would leave Belarus after training ended, a statement later rejected by the Ministry of Defense, who claimed that they would remain "for an unknown period of time". The number of Russian troops that would remain in Belarus was estimated to be at around 30,000. It was also speculated that Belarus could host Russian nuclear weaponry.

The former version of the Constitution of Belarus stipulated the country was neutral. However, Belarus held a constitutional referendum on 27 February 2022, which was declared to have passed with 65% support. As one of the changes, Belarus revoked its neutral and non-nuclear status. Lukashenko later clarified that he would request Russia to bring nuclear weapons if NATO moved to bring them to Poland or Lithuania, the country's western neighbours.

== Involvement in Russian invasion ==
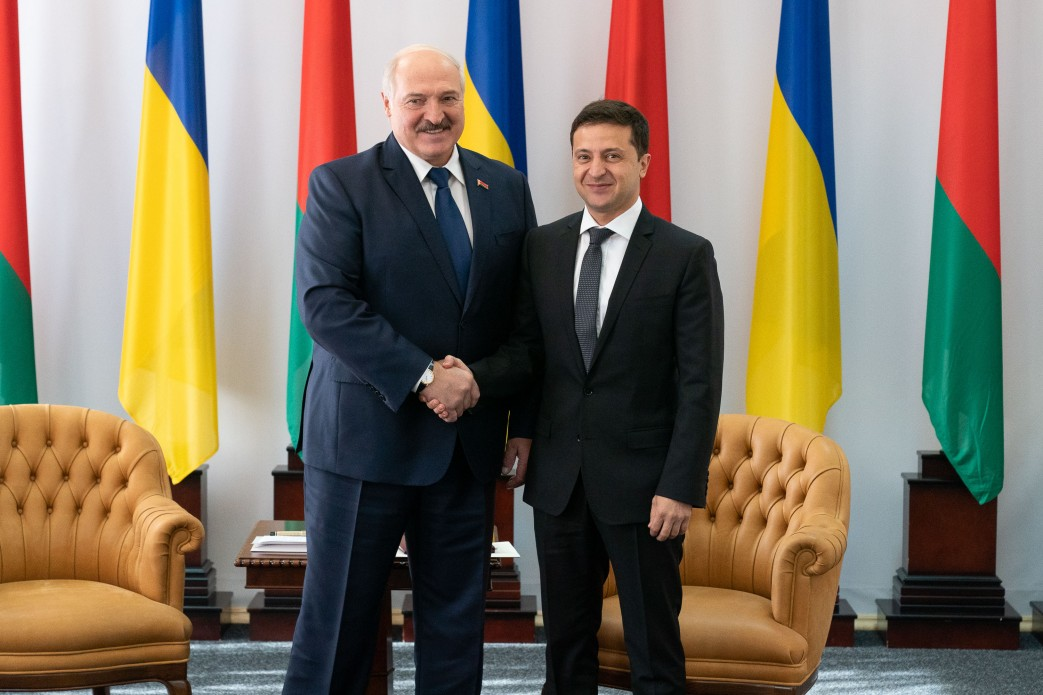
Alexander Lukashenko and Volodymyr Zelenskyy in Zhytomyr on October 4, 2019.

In the initial stages of the military conflict, Belarus lent its territory to Russian soldiers to attack Ukraine, but did not appear to have sent its own soldiers into the conflict. On the day of invasion, the State Border Guard Service of Ukraine reported about Russian troops trying to break through the Belarus-Ukraine border at the Vilcha border crossing, and a helicopter without identification marks attacking a bridge near Slavutych. CNN published a video showing tanks entering Ukraine through the Senkivka border crossing, on the tripoint with Russia. Also on that day, Chernobyl, together with the nearby former nuclear power plant, was seized after Russian troops entered Ukraine from Belarus via the unpopulated Chernobyl Exclusion Zone.

Belarus also allowed Russia full access to its military airbases for Russian military aircraft to launch aircraft and its army installations to shoot artillery and missiles from its territory towards its southern neighbour, or to cross its border southbound. Already on 24 February, the Ukrainian commander-in-chief reported that four ballistic missiles were launched from Belarus towards the southwest Ukraine. Two days later, Maxar Technologies published satellite images with 150 helicopters and hundreds of ground vehicles stationed near Khoyniki, some 50 km (31 mi) from the Ukrainian border, with 90 helicopters using a local straight road as a temporary airbase. Belarusian media and Telegram channels also circulated numerous videos and photos showing movement of Russian armored vehicles and helicopters in southern Belarus. Three days later, the Ukrainian Centre for Strategic Communication reported that Zhytomyr Airport was bombed by the missiles launched from the territory of Belarus. On 8 March, ImageSat International published satellite images of three missile launchers (possibly Russian 9K720 Iskander) in the field near Kalinkavichy (southeastern Belarus), and new planes (Russian A-50 or A-100) and Mi-26 heavy helicopters at Baranavichy air base.

Eventually, reports of Belarusian troops in Ukraine started to appear. On 28 February, Belarusian opposition media outlet Charter 97 claimed that some Belarusian soldiers were among the wounded and killed invasion troops in Ukraine, citing anonymous Belarusian and Ukrainian sources. On 1 March, a Ukrainian senior military official said to the public broadcaster Suspilne that Belarusian soldiers had been spotted on the ground in Chernihiv Oblast since 27 February and that they were moving from Horodnia towards Chernihiv, the capital of the northernmost region of Ukraine; however, the Office of the President could not confirm the reports. On 6 March, a Ukrainian presidential adviser, Oleksiy Arestovych, said that the Belarusian army had not taken part in the invasion thus far, stating that earlier claims of Belarusian involvement were based on Russian attempts to project the image of Belarusian aggression. There was no independent confirmation.

Russian troops wounded in Ukraine were reportedly treated by Belarusian and Russian doctors at hospitals in Homiel and in other cities of Homiel Region. Russian soldiers killed in Ukraine were reported to be placed in morgues in the Homiel Region. On 13 March, Ukrainian media reported that treatment of wounded Russian soldiers in Belarusian hospitals led to the exhaustion of all blood reserves made for soldiers, and doctors started to use reserves for the civil population of Belarus. It was also reported that Belarusians were encouraged to donate blood.

According to the Charter 97 news channel, reporting on 5 and 6 March 2022, most low-ranked Belarusian soldiers were opposed to participating in the invasion of Ukraine. Charter 97 and its chief editor, Natalya Radina, also stated that Belarusian officers reported to their seniors that they would risk mutiny or mass surrender if they took their units into Ukraine.

On 10 March, Secretary of the National Security and Defense Council of Ukraine Oleksiy Danilov claimed that the invasion from Belarus was a "backstab", unlike other directions of Russian invasion which were foreseen.

According to the Centre for Eastern Studies, Belarusian logistical units were operating in Ukraine in March 2022. The European Union Institute for Security Studies also said in March that the Belarusian armed forces was providing Russia with ″full logistical and military medical support″. On 10 March, two Belarusian truck drivers were killed in Korosten in northern Ukraine during an aerial bombardment. The planes were presumably based in Belarus. On the same day, an unidentified Russian plane crashed near Luninets Air Base in Belarus (the pilots ejected successfully). The Ukrainian media outlet Obozrevatel claimed that the plane was shot over Ukraine and failed to reach the airbase in Belarus.

On 11 March, Ukrainian officials accused Russia of conducting airstrikes on Belarusian settlements from Ukrainian airspace in an attempt to force Belarus more directly into the hostilities. NATO intelligence also indicated that Russian jets have taken off from Belarus, presumably from Belarusian airbases, to subsequently enter Ukraine from Belarusian airspace; CNN described this as Belarus being used as a "springboard" for air attacks into northern Ukraine.

On 17 March, the open-source investigators MotolkoHelp reported that more Russian Iskander missiles were deployed at the Machulishchy air base and air-defense systems were seen on the territory of Belarus, such as Pantsir-S1 in the Minsk region and near the town of Mazyr and S-400 at Baranavichy. According to MotolkoHelp, Belarusian soldiers were ordered to do the "dirty job" for the Russian forces, such as repairing damaged hardware and cleaning vehicles of dirt and human remains.

On multiple occasions, NATO, US, and/or Ukrainian officials/authorities have issued warnings that Belarus may imminently enter the war to assist Russia, including after the 11 March accusations of a Russian-initiated false flag attack on Belarusian border settlements. On 22 March, a 'senior NATO intelligence official' stated that Belarus is "preparing the environment to justify a Belarusian offensive against Ukraine," though the decision to join the war had not been made yet.

Russian soldiers who returned to Belarus tried to sell the goods looted in Ukraine or send them to Russia. On 2 April 2022, Ukrainian intelligence reported that Russian soldiers made a "bazaar" in Naroulia to sell the goods (washing machines, refrigerators, cars, bicycles, dishes, carpets, works of art, jewelry, toys, cosmetics, etc.). On 4 April, Belarusian journalists published a 3-hour footage of Russian soldiers drawing up documents to send large amount of goods in a postal service in Mazyr (one of them had the badge of the 56th Guards Air Assault Brigade). Russian soldiers also tried to sell goods to Belarusians via the Internet.

On 10 October, Lukashenko ordered Belarusian troops to join Russian troops near Ukraine, claiming Kyiv posed a clear threat to Belarus,

In a June 2025 article for the Carnegie Endowment for International Peace, Artyom Shraibman wrote that leading up to and in the initial phase of the full-scale invasion, Lukashenko ″provided Russia's army and defense industry with everything that Belarus could give″.

=== Stationing of nuclear weapons in Belarus ===
Following a 2022 constitutional referendum, the Belarusian and Russian militaries have pursued policies of stationing tactical nuclear weapons in Belarus. On 26 March 2023, Putin announced that Russia would station tactical nuclear weapons in Belarus under a nuclear sharing agreement, and that 9K720 Iskander missile launch systems had been transferred to Belarus. This decision came in spite of a joint Russian-Chinese declaration issued only days earlier calling on nuclear powers to withdraw all nuclear weapons from abroad. Since the announcement, Belarusian units have been trained in the usage of Iskander systems, and Russian ambassador to Belarus Boris Gryzlov has stated that nuclear weapons would be stationed at undisclosed locations in western Belarus.

Russia's stationing of nuclear weapons has been condemned by Belarusian opposition leader Sviatlana Tsikhanouskaya, who stated that the deployment "grossly contradicts the will of the Belarusian people," and Ukrainian president Volodymyr Zelenskyy, who referred to it as a "step towards internal destabilisation". The Atlantic Council think tank has described the stationing of tactical nuclear weapons in Belarus as demonstrating the status of Belarus as a puppet state.

=== 2024 troop buildup on Ukrainian border ===
On 10 August 2024, amidst Ukraine's offensive into Russia's Kursk Oblast, Belarus announced the transfer of an Iskander missile, Polonez MLRS and special forces to areas bordering Ukraine. This announcement followed statements by president Alexander Lukashenko about Ukrainian attack drones shot down over Belarusian's airspace. The head of the Center for Combating Disinformation of the National Security and Defense Council of Ukraine (NSDC) Andriy Kovalenko interpreted these actions by Minsk as an attempt to help Russia and distract the attention of the Ukrainian command to the Belarusian direction.

On 11 August, the Belarusian Defense Ministry announced that it was moving its tanks to the Belarus–Ukraine border to reinforce the troop grouping there. On 18 August, President Lukashenko announced that Belarus had deployed around a third of its army to the border with Ukraine, and on 19 August announced that additional forces were being transferred to the border, including air defence, aircraft, and weapons storage. On 25 August, Ukraine said that Belarus was "concentrating a significant number of personnel" on the border, including artillery, multiple-launch rocket systems and air defense systems. The Ukrainian Ministry of Foreign Affairs said that this was being done "under the guise of exercises", and requested Belarus to withdraw the amassed forces from the border.

=== Directing drones into Ukraine ===
In May 2026, the Ukrainian commander of the Unmanned Systems Forces, Robert Brovdi, accused Belarus of providing direct tactical assistance to Russia by aiding Russian drones flying through Belarusian airspace to bypass Ukrainian air defence, allowing for strikes on Ukrainian territory.

== Involvement in war crimes ==
The Belarusian state and state-affiliated organisations have actively participated in the forced transfers of Ukrainian children. Ukrainian children have been deported to Belarus where they are held in recreational camps. The National Anti-Crisis Management Group, a Belarusian organisation headed by Belarusian opposition figure Pavel Latushka, used open-source information to report in August 2023 that at least 2,100 Ukrainian children had been transferred to Belarus. According to Latushka, they were being held in summer camps administered by state-owned corporations. He also said that to state documents showed the transfers are being conducted under the authority of the Union State. The transfers of Ukrainian children have been shown on Belarusian state television. There are indications of re-education efforts by the Belarusian state. Much of the information about the child abductions has come from their parents; children that have been deported to Belarus were abducted from regions of Ukraine which were still under Russian occupation as of August 2023, impeding investigations.

According to international humanitarian law, children in war zones should be evacuated to neutral third countries whenever possible; Belarus lent its territory to be used as a staging ground for the Russian invasion of Ukraine.

In a July 2023 interview with the Belarusian state TV channel Belarus-1, Dzmitry Shautsou, the head of the Belarus Red Cross, clad in military clothing embellished with the Z symbol, admitted to the abduction and deportation of Ukrainian children from Russian-occupied areas to Belarus for “health improvement” reasons, saying that it would continue to do so. The International Federation of Red Cross and Red Crescent Societies distanced itself from his statements while expressing "grave concern", demanded a halt to the practice, and launched an investigation by its investigative committee.

In February 2024, the European Union blacklisted Shautsou, as well as several other persons and organizations from Belarus for their involvement in the Ukrainian child abductions. The United States, Ukraine, Australia and New Zealand have also imposed sanctions in relation to the forced deportations.

== Legal complicity ==
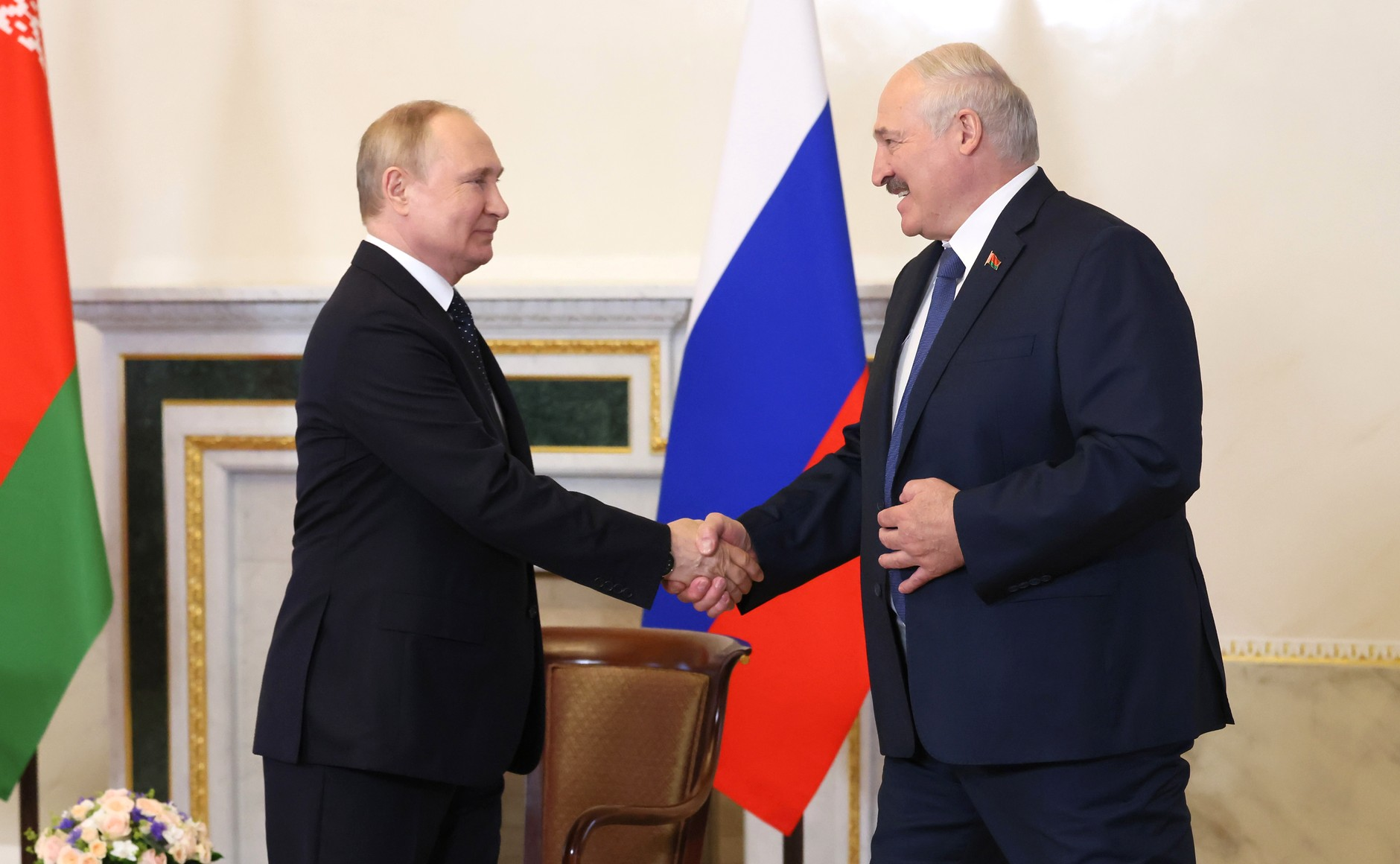
Alexander Lukashenko and Vladimir Putin on 25 June 2022

According to legal scholar Niklas Reetz, by aiding the Russian invasion, Belarus is complicit in the invasion by violating the international prohibition against "the threat or use of force against the territorial integrity or political independence of any state" of the UN Charter, Chapter 1, Article 2(4). It is guilty of aggression according to the United Nations' definition, by "allowing its territory, which it has placed at the disposal of another State, to be used by that other State for perpetrating an act of aggression". Nevertheless, the OSCE considered Belarus not a party to the international armed conflict in April 2022.

Belarus was described as a co-belligerent of Russia in the Russo-Ukrainian War by the Institute for the Study of War in 2022 reports. The International Institute for Strategic Studies 2023 Armed Conflict Survey also described Belarus as "a co-belligerent but not a co-combatant".

The Centre for Eastern Studies said in February 2023 that from a legal and military point of view, offensive operations on Ukraine being launched from Belarusian territory and Belarusian logistical units operating in Ukraine in March 2022 makes Belarus a direct participant in the war. A 2023 report in the Jamestown Foundation's Eurasia Daily Monitor described Belarus as "nominally neutral in Russia’s war against Ukraine". In November 2023, Marshall Center alumni scholar Pavlo Troian opined that the United Nations General Assembly adopted resolution on defining aggression ″clearly″ implicates Belarus. He also added that Belarus also provided and continues to provide numerous substantial forms of support for Russia in the war, including provision of military infrastructure and logistics.

In September 2024, The International Strategic Action Network for Security published a report saying it had collected and verified data concerning Belarus's contribution to Russia's aggression against Ukraine, saying that the Lukashenko regime's actions fully meet the Article 3 UN General Assembly for an act of aggression.

== Belarusian opposition to the invasion ==
=== Public opinion in Belarus ===
According to Chatham House, 79% of Belarusians think that the death of Belarusian soldiers during the war between Russia and Ukraine is unacceptable, and more than 50% thought that Belarus should remain neutral. Participants of the survey, among other questions, were asked "What should Belarus have done after the outbreak of hostilities between Russia and Ukraine?". 33% expressed their support for Russian actions (including 3% being in favor of Belarus taking part in the conflict on the side of Russia and 30% against), 25% supported complete neutrality and expulsion of all foreign troops from Belarusian territory, 21% were unsure and 20% supported Ukraine (including 1% being in favor of Belarus taking part in the conflict on the side of Ukraine and 19% against). Thus, at least 74% of Belarusians, regardless of their political stances, had a negative attitude towards any Belarusian involvement in the war.

It is believed that “a deployment of Belarusian soldiers in a fully-fledged war would represent a radical break with Lukashenka's cornerstone ideology of peace and stability [and raise] the question of Lukashenka's support from a critical part of Belarusian society that thus far had been hesitant to openly oppose the regime.”

According to Rosemary Thomas OBE (former British Ambassador in Minsk between 2009 and 2012) "Belarusian territory had (the) highest level of slaughter during WW2. They know what's it's about. Ordinary Belarusians see Ukraine as (a) brother nation. They don't want war at all but ESPECIALLY not with Ukraine."

According to Julie D. Fisher, U.S. Special Envoy for Belarus, Ambassador since 2020, it is obvious that “Belarusians do not want their soldiers to fight, Russian troops to invade Ukraine from Belarus, Russian soldiers to stay in Belarus. The Belarusian people do not want decisions to be made for them from abroad".

=== Condemnation of war by opposition leaders ===
Belarusian exiled opposition leader Sviatlana Tsikhanouskaya condemned Lukashenko for participating in the invasion and expressed her belief that “Ukraine will win this war”. She also suggested that Lukashenko is no longer in control of the Belarusian military. Tsikhanouskaya supports Volodymyr Zelenskyy's calls to close the skies over Ukraine. Tsikhanouskaya declared that any orders of Belarusian military commanders to join the war on the Russian side would be criminal and such commanders would be prosecuted by military tribunals; she urged Belarusian soldiers to disobey such illegal orders.

Another opposition leader, Pavel Latushka called for similar sanctions and restrictions to be introduced against Lukashenko as against Putin: “Rockets were also fired at Ukraine from the territory of Belarus, and Lukashenko is the same aggressor as Putin”. He also called for recognising Belarus as a territory temporarily occupied by Russia because the Belarusian regime had lost its independence in decision making and had no control over the territory of Belarus anymore.

Ivonka Survilla, President of the Rada of the Belarusian Democratic Republic sent a public letter to the President of Ukraine Volodymyr Zelenskyy, in which she expressed support for the Ukrainian people in their struggle for democracy, independence and European future. She also asked Zelenskyy not to identify Belarusians with the illegitimate regime of Lukashenko and to request Ukrainian officials and media “to cease the unjustified harassment and insults of Belarusians, direct association of the Belarusian people with the dictator and disparaging of the efforts of Belarusians in their long struggle against Lukashenko's regime" because “there can be no collective responsibility and collective guilt in [the current political] situation [in Belarus]”.

On 18 April 2022, Survilla addressed Belarusian volunteers fighting for Ukraine and confirmed that they were also fighting for the independence of Belarus.

=== Condemnation of war by journalists and celebrities ===
Belarusian Nobel Laureate Svetlana Alexievich called Lukashenka's actions over Ukraine a 'crime'. She added that if Belarusian troops are sent to Ukraine by Lukashenka to assist Russia to fight against Ukrainian forces "heroism for them will be not to shoot." She also said that Russia's war against Ukraine is a worse evil than World War II and that Ukrainians and Belarusians fighting against Putin in this war for freedom are heroes.

Another Belarusian writer, Alhierd Bacharevič declared that “we have the same enemy: the Belarusians, the Ukrainians, the Lithuanians, and even the Russians. And this enemy is Putin's empire, Putinism, Putin's fascism!”

More than 80 representatives of the Belarusian film industry publicly condemned Russia's military aggression against Ukraine.

Belarusian tennis star Victoria Azarenka “declare[d] her dismay and great sadness at the events” in Ukraine.

Former Belarusian Olympic swimmer Aliaksandra Herasimenia also stated her opposition to the Belarusian government's involvement in the war: “Ukraine has never been our enemy, it is our fraternal people.”

=== Anti-war public protests and acts of sabotage in Belarus ===
Despite very tight security measures imposed by Lukashenka's regime, protests against the invasion were held in cities across Belarus on 27 February, the day of voting on the changes to the Belarusian constitution, during which 800 people were detained, according to Ministry of Internal Affairs of Belarus.

Belarusian activists disrupted work of the Belarusian Railway (transports Russian military trains) destroying two control points of semaphore signals and railroad switches, organizing a short circuit of the signaling system near Mahilioŭ. Ministry of internal affairs of Belarus called these acts "terrorist attacks" and accused opposition figures Sviatlana Tsikhanouskaya and Pavel Latushko of inspiring them. On 2 March, hacktivists damaged network infrastructure of the Belarusian Railway. On 3 March The Jerusalem Post reported that the General prosecutor had opened an investigation on sabotage. There have been numerous acts of sabotage.

By 9 March 2022, at least eight people were arrested on suspicion of disrupting the movement of Russian military trains in Belarus. The acts of sabotage prompted the Belarusian authorities to instruct a special military division to patrol the railways in plain clothes.

On 30 March 2022, the police wounded three men aged 27 and 28 years from Babrujsk while detaining them for having allegedly damaged railways equipment near Asipovichy.

By 13 April 2022, seven criminal cases were instituted for the dissemination of the information on movement of Russian military equipment in Homiel region.

There has been some 80 acts of sabotage on Belarusian railways as of 12 April. Based on data from the Belarusian Interior Ministry. Most common form of damage is setting fire to the signalling equipment. This disrupts the lights on the railway system, reducing the train speed down to 20–15 km/h (12–9 mph). A married couple has also set fire to the logs of military equipment kept by the railways. Other act of sabotage have involved the railways workers themselves, as well as hackers attacking the computer system. Deputy Belarus Interior Minister has threatened to kill such individuals, in a statement in early March. Shots were fired at people attempting to set fire to the signal box, in late March.

According to Oleksiy Arestovich, adviser to the Office of the President of Ukraine on strategic communications in the field of national security and defence, “Belarusian partisans managed to damage the Belarusian railways... Seriously damaged, and made life difficult for the Russian troops.”

On 21 April 2022, eleven people accused of acts of sabotage were recognized political prisoners by the human rights community of Belarus.

On 23 April 2022, The Washington Post wrote about a clandestine Belarusian network of railway workers and dissidents who helped to stop Russia's assault on Kyiv.

On 26 February 2023 a Russian A-50 airborne early warning and control (AEW&C) aircraft was reportedly damaged by explosions while stationary at the Machulishchy air base near Minsk, a Belarusian partisan group named "Plan Victory" claimed to have attacked the plane using drone-dropped munitions. However, satellite imagery of the Machulishchy air base from 28 February showed no significant damage to the sole A-50 located there.

=== Belarusian volunteers serving in Ukrainian Armed Forces ===
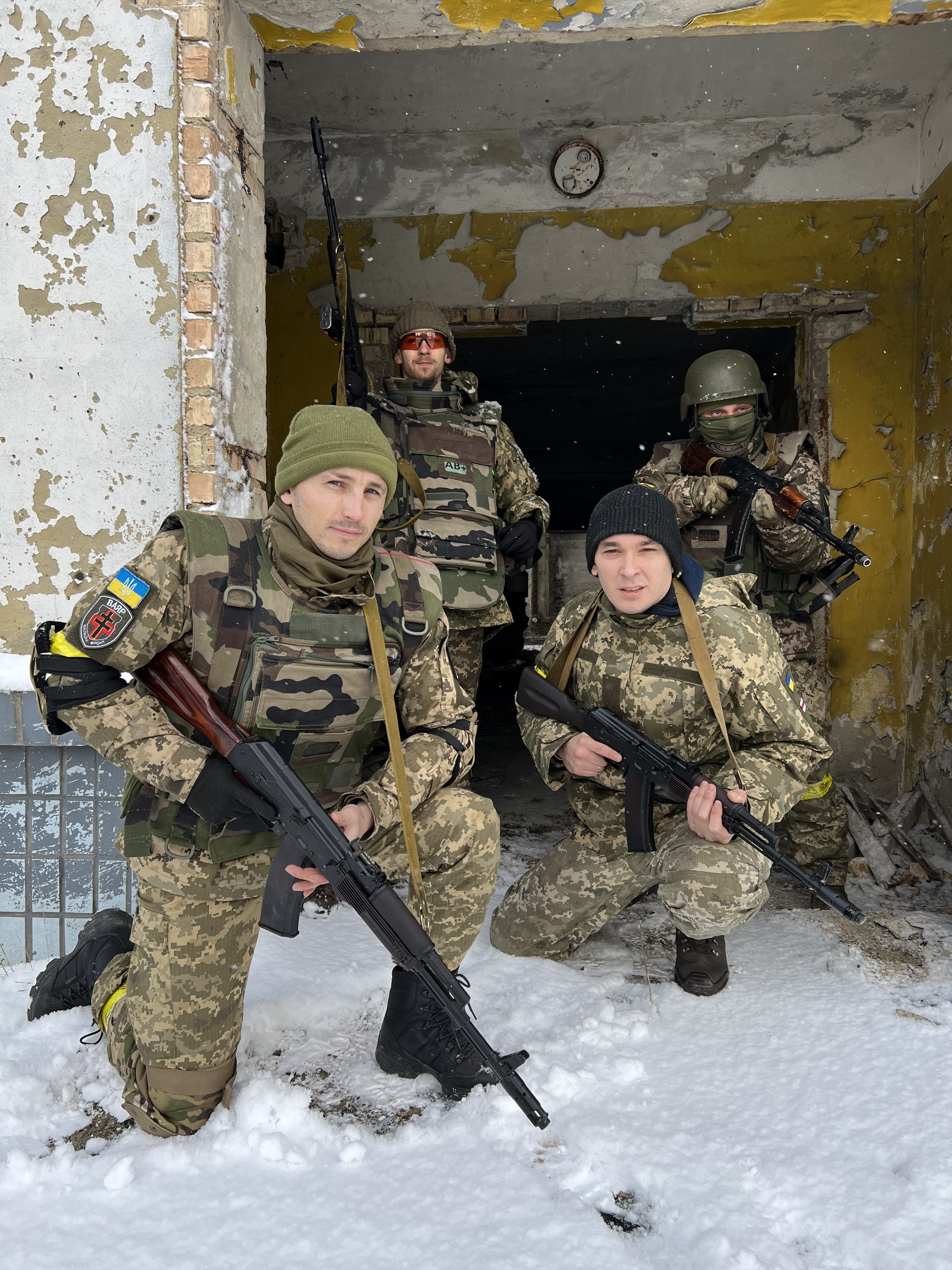
Belarusian volunteers in Ukrainian Armed Forces on 8 March 2022 (later, a separate Belarusian battalion was created)

Already during the War in Donbas (2014–2022), Belarusians fought alongside Ukraine, forming the Pahonia Detachment and the Tactical group "Belarus".

In spring 2022, it was reported that more than 200 Belarusian citizens have joined the Armed Forces of Ukraine to defend Ukraine from the Russian invasion, with another 300 volunteers from Belarus came through Poland. In July 2023, Radio Free Europe/Radio Liberty reported that around 450 Belarusians fight for Ukraine.

In the beginning of the full-scale invasion, Belarusians have created a separate battalion named after Kastuś Kalinoŭski to defend Kyiv. It later transformed into a regiment consisting of two battalions, a UAV unit and a medical company. The Kastus Kalinouski Regiment was also joined by Pavel Shurmei, a former Belarusian Olympic rower and world record holder.

Another Belarusian volunteer battalion fighting for Ukraine, a part of the Kastuś Kalinoŭski Battalion, was known as the Pahonia Regiment. It ceased to exist in 2023.

Other Belarusian units include the Belarusian Volunteer Corps which includes the Terror Battalion. There are also around 20 Belarusians fighting in the Second International Legion. Andrei Tratseuski, one of the co-founders of the Belarusian Volunteer Corps would later become commander of the Special Unit “1514”.

In June 2023, Valery Sakhashchyk, effective defence minister of the Belarusian United Transitional Cabinet (a government-in-exile opposed to the de facto government of Alexander Lukashenko) informed about the creation of the 1st separate air assault company "Belarus", which is part of the 79th Air Assault Brigade. The Belarusian assault company is located in the Donetsk direction.

Several other Belarusians are fighting in different Ukrainian military formations as well.

==== Volunteers killed in action ====
As of May 2023, nearly 45 Belarusian soldiers from the Ukraine Foreign Legion were killed in action. Belarusian volunteers are one of the largest foreign military groups fighting on the side of Ukraine's army.

On 4 March 2022, it was reported that Illia "Licvin" was the first Belarusian volunteer to be killed in action, during heavy fighting near the Ukrainian city of Bucha.

On 13 March 2022 it was reported that a member of Kastuś Kalinoŭski Battalion nicknamed "Tur" (real name Aliaksiej Skoblia) was killed in action near Kyiv when his unit was ambushed. On 13 April 2022, Ukrainian President Zelenskyy posthumously awarded Skoblia the title of "Hero of Ukraine" - "for personal courage and heroism in defending the state sovereignty and territorial integrity of Ukraine, loyalty to the military oath."

On 24 March 2022, Zmicier Apanasovič ("Terror") was killed in the battle for Irpin.

Dzmitryj Rubašeŭski ("Hans") became the fourth Belarusian who died defending Ukraine. He came to fight for Ukraine in 2015, in 2019 he was seriously wounded and lost his eye.

In April 2022, Kanstancin Dziubajla ("Dranik") was killed while fighting for Ukraine in Donetsk Oblast.

On 16 May 2022, Paval "Volat", the commander of a detachment of Kastuś Kalinoŭski Battalion was mortally wounded during a fight for a Ukrainian village and died on the way to hospital.

=== Anti-war actions by the Belarusian diaspora ===
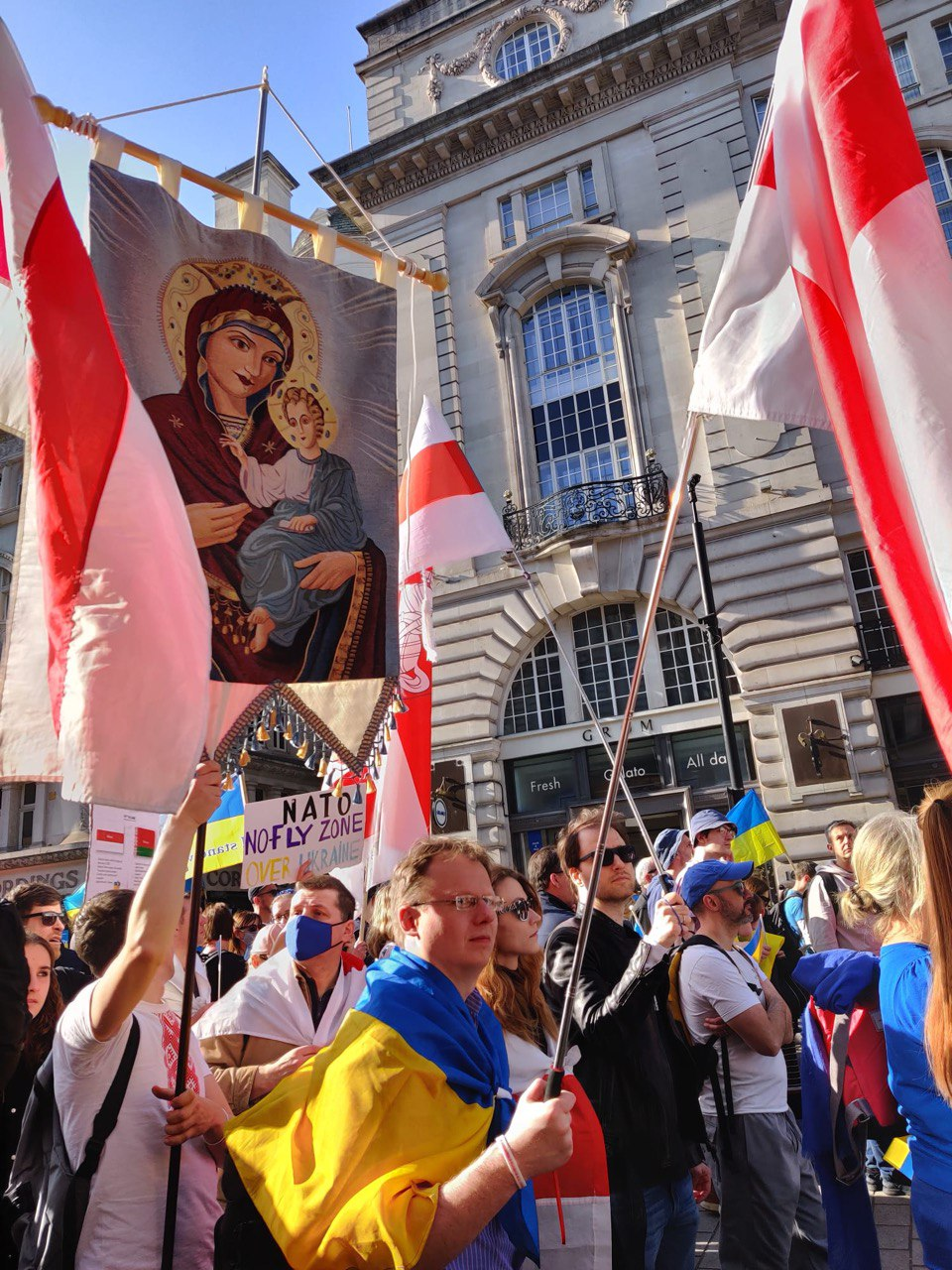
Belarusian diaspora participating in the Stand with Ukraine March in London, 26 March 2022

Belarusians living outside Belarus and Ukraine express their solidarity with the Ukrainian people by attending anti-war rallies, helping organisations dealing with Ukrainian refugees, collecting and delivering financial and humanitarian aid as well as helping Belarusian volunteers fighting for Ukraine. Several organisations in the UK established the Belarusians in Britain for Ukraine, an umbrella initiative to co-ordinate their response.

== Reactions ==
=== Belarus ===
==== Government ====
Belarusian President Alexander Lukashenko denied involvement of the Belarusian military in the conflict at the time, and the Belarusian Ministry of Defense did not comment on the reports of missiles launched from Belarus hitting any Ukrainian targets. On 27 February, Alexander Lukashenko acknowledged that projectiles were launched by Russia from Belarus against Ukraine, but commented this was a "forced step". Lukashenko also announced that he would not order Belarusian troops to join the Russians fighting in Ukraine, nevertheless he decided to move more forces to the Ukrainian border on 1 March.

Lukashenko claimed in August 2023, March 2025, and August 2025 that he didn't know about Russian plans to invade Ukraine.

In January 2025, Lukashenko said he had "no regrets" about Belarus helping Russia to invade Ukraine.

==== Opposition ====
Exiled Belarusian opposition leader Sviatlana Tsikhanouskaya accused Lukashenko of participating in a "treacherous act of aggression" and added that his regime fully shared responsibility for the actions of Russia, while another opposition politician, Anatoly Lebedko, accused him of ″selling the country's sovereignty piecemeal to Putin in exchange for his political and military support″. Belarusian opposition journalists claimed that the actions of the Belarusian government could be treated as aggression according to article 3 (section "f") of the United Nations General Assembly Resolution 3314 ("The action of a State in allowing its territory, which it has placed at the disposal of another State, to be used by that other State for perpetration an act of aggression against a third State [...] ... qualify as an act of aggression"). Protests against the invasion were held in cities across Belarus on 27 February, the day of voting on the changes to the Belarusian constitution, during which 800 people were detained, according to Ministry of Internal Affairs of Belarus.

Following the invasion, Belarusian activists disrupted work of the Belarusian Railway, which transported Russian military trains, destroying two control points of semaphore signals and railroad switches, organizing a short circuit of the signaling system near Mahilioŭ, starting a ″rail war″ Ministry of internal affairs of Belarus called these acts "terrorist attacks" and accused opposition figures Sviatlana Tsikhanouskaya and Pavel Latushko of inspiring them. On 2 March, hacktivists damaged network infrastructure of the Belarusian Railway. On 3 March The Jerusalem Post reported that the General prosecutor had opened an investigation on sabotage.

The authorities accused them of terrorism and in February 2024 sentenced 13 people to a total of almost 200 years in prison. The Belarusian cyber-partisans, an opposition group founded during the 2020–2021 Belarusian protests, conducted cyber attacks against the Belarusian rail network, the Belarusian KGB, and the Russian flag carrier, Aeroflot.

On the third anniversary of the invasion, the Belarusian Human Rights Center Viasna reported that 209 people were sentenced by Belarusian courts. The convictions included: 41 for donating to Belarusians fighting in the war; 30 for sharing photos and videos of Russian military equipment; 35 for treason; 24 for terrorism; and 93 for support or creation of an "extremist" group. A year earlier, the center reported that Belarusian authorities had arrested 1,671 people since the start of the invasion, among them 1,500 in the first one and a half months of the full-scale war.

==== Churches and religious organisations ====
The clampdown of the 2020–2021 protests severely reduced the Christian communities' ability to express their position independently of the government. By 2022, the pro-democratic public activity of Belarusian Christians had concentrated around the Christian Vision group, most members of which were based abroad. On the day of the invasion, the group issued a statement condemning the aggression and the use of the Belarusian territory by the Russian army, expressing solidarity with Ukraine and calling on Belarusian soldiers to not participate in the war.

Initially, the leadership of all main Belarusian Christian denomination avoided referring to those events as an invasion or war. The head of the Belarusian Orthodox Church, Metropolitan Veniyamin, did not condemn the invasion but called the sides "to make steps to each other". An Orthodox theologian, Natallia Vasilevich, criticised his stance. Other Orthodox bishops remained silent.

The initial announcement of the Conference of the Catholic Bishops in Belarus, published on 26 February, referred to the "conflict in Ukraine". In response to the laity's strong criticism, the episcopal conference gathered for an extraordinary meeting on 3 March. In its statement, the bishops expressed a concern about the political conflict becoming a war and called not to allow Belarus to take part in it. On 9 March, the Ukrainian Greek Catholic Church thanked Belarusian bishops for their "fraternal solidarity".

On 2 March, four bishops of Evangelical denominations called on their believers for a three-day fasting and prayer for stopping the war in Ukraine. They mentioned that Belarus was also involved in it.

On 9 March, the Ukrainian Council of Churches and Religious Organizations petitioned Belarusian religious leaders "to use their authority to prevent the involvement of the Belarusian army in the war against Ukraine".

Prayers for Ukraine and peace in Ukraine took place is some Catholic parishes and convents. Several Eastern Orthodox, Catholic and Protestant priests and pastors publicly protested against the war. An Orthodox priest, Mikhail Maruha, was detained during a rally against the Russian invasion of Ukraine near the Minsk railway station on 28 February and sentenced to a 13-day arrest.

On 3 March, the Mothers’ Union called mothers of soldiers to come to the Belarusian Orthodox cathedral in Minsk to pray for an end to Russia's aggression and Belarus abstaining from taking part. Nearly 100 mothers joined the action, at least four women and two journalists were detained.

===== Churches in diaspora =====
On 27 February, a Greek Catholic parish in London addressed Ukrainian brethren expressing solidarity with the people of Ukraine and the wish for their victory to inspire Belarusians to end the Russian occupation of their country.

=== Ukraine ===
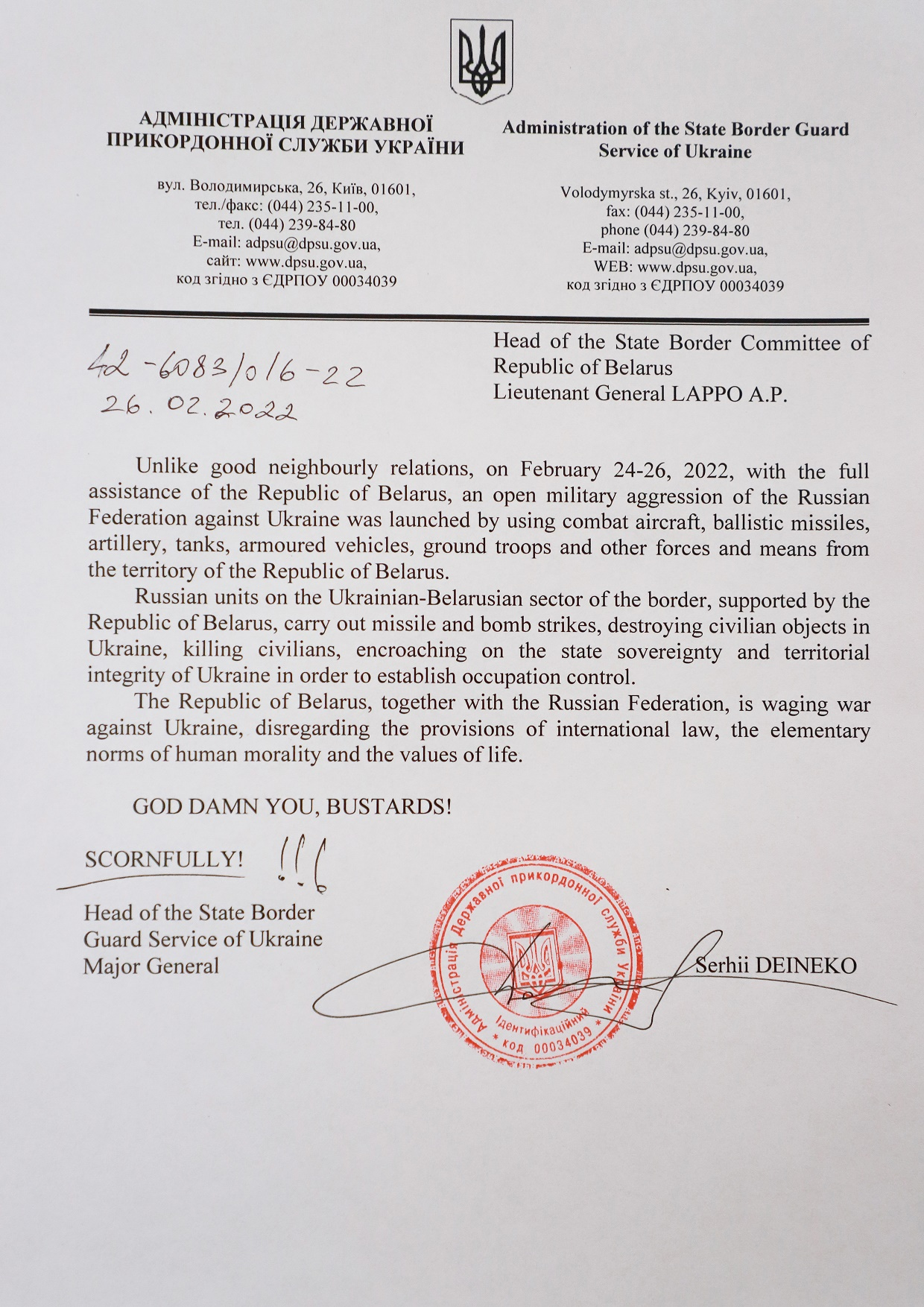
Letter from head of State Border Guard Service of Ukraine Serhii Deineko to head of State Border Committee of Belarus Anatoly Lappo, 26 February 2022

On 26 February, the head of State Border Guard Service of Ukraine Serhii Deineko wrote an official letter to chief of the State Border Committee of Belarus Anatoly Lappo, accusing his organization of helping Russia to invade Ukraine from the north. Some MPs of Verkhovna Rada, Ukraine's parliament, have called to break diplomatic ties with its northerly neighbour.

A large number of internet hackers, in particular connected to a decentralised collective called Anonymous and the Ukrainian IT Army, launched numerous cyberattacks against Belarusian government agencies and the state railway. In response to the invasion, Anonymous leaked some 200 gigabytes of correspondence of Belarusian private defence contractor Tetraedr.

A poll conducted by the Razumkov Centre between February and March 2023 found that 81% of Ukrainian respondents expressed a negative attitude towards Belarus.

=== Western countries ===
Belarus's assistance of Russia's invasion drew condemnation from Western powers. On the day of invasion, the US Treasury issued sanctions against Belarus for its involvement in the Russian invasion. Several military industrial companies and generals were sanctioned. On 26 February, Japan considered issuing similar sanctions, which it introduced two days later.

The European Union issued the first set of sanctions against Belarus - the first was introduced on 27 February, which banned certain categories of Belarusian items in the EU, including timber, steel, mineral fuels and tobacco. After the Lithuanian prime minister proposed disconnecting Belarus from SWIFT, the European Union, which does not recognise Lukashenko as the legitimate President of Belarus, started to plan an extension of the sanctions already issued against Russian entities and top officials to its ally.

In June 2024, the Council of Europe expanded restrictive measures targeting the Belarusian economy citing Belarus's continued military support of Russia.

As of August 2024, NATO Allies have condemned Belarus for enabling and being complicit in Russia's full-scale invasion of Ukraine.

=== United Nations ===
On 2 March 2022, the United Nations General Assembly overwhelmingly voted to reprimand Russia over its invasion of Ukraine and demanded that Moscow stop fighting and withdraw its military forces, an action that aims to diplomatically isolate Russia at the world body. 141 of the Assembly's 193 members voted for the resolution (ES-11/1), 35 including China abstained and 5 countries including Russia and Belarus voted against the document. The paragraph 10 of the United Nations General Assembly Resolution of 2 March 2022 confirmed the involvement of Belarus in unlawful use of force against Ukraine.

== See also ==
- Foreign involvement in the Russo-Ukrainian war (2022–present)
- Prelude to the 2022 Russian invasion of Ukraine
