= Belarusians in Ukraine =

Ethnic group in Ukraine

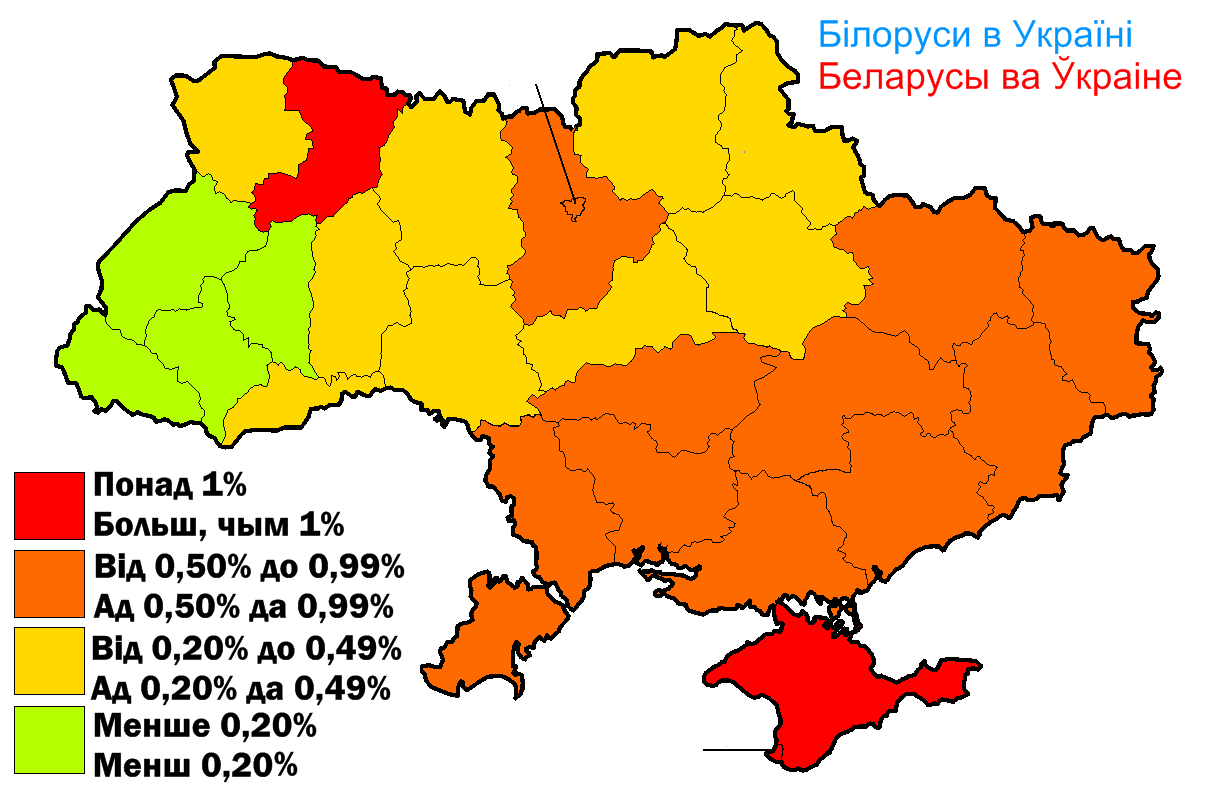
- Percentage of Belarusians in Ukraine by region

Total population
- 275,763 (2001)

Regions with significant populations
- Donetsk Oblast: 44,525 (2001)
- Crimea (w/ Sevastopol): 35,157 (2001)
- Dnipropetrovsk Oblast: 29,528 (2001)
- Luhansk Oblast: 20,587 (2001)
- Kyiv: 16,549 (2001)
- Kharkiv Oblast: 14,752 (2001)
- Odesa Oblast: 12,767 (2001)
- Zaporizhzhia Oblast: 12,655 (2001)
- Rivne Oblast: 11,827 (2001)
- other regions of Ukraine: 77,416 (2001)

Languages
- Russian (62.5%) Belarusian (19.8%) Ukrainian (17.5%)

Religion
- Eastern Orthodoxy, Belarusian Greek Catholic Church

Related ethnic groups
- Slavic people (West Slavs, East Slavs, South Slavs)

Belarusians in Ukraine (Belarusian: Беларусы Украіны, romanized: Biełarusy Ukrainy; Ukrainian: Білоруси в Україні, romanized: Bilorusy v Ukraini) are the third biggest minority after Russians. Unlike many other ethnic groups, Belarusians do not have any particular concentration in the country, but spread out relatively evenly across all regions.

== History ==
=== Early history ===
During the 16th and 17th centuries, numerous students from Belarusian lands studied in Ukrainian educational establishments, such as Ostroh Academy, Lviv Brotherhood School and Kyiv Mohyla Academy. During the 19th and early 20th centuries, Ukrainian lands were visited by Belarusian authors Francišak Bahuševič, who studied at Nizhyn Lycaeum, and Alaiza Pashkevich, who spent some time in Galicia. During the 1920s, cultural activists from Byelorussian SSR organized several tours around Soviet Ukraine, and Belarusian author Yanka Kupala was elected member of the Ukrainian Academy of Sciences.

According to the 1926 Soviet census, 76,000 Belarusians lived in Ukrainian SSR, half of them in cities. An additional 3,800 Belarusians resided in Crimea. Most of Belarusian population was concentrated in Kyiv, Dnipropetrovsk and the Donbas. Additionally, several rural colonies with Belarusian population existed in Mykolaiv and Dnipropetrovsk Oblasts. Belarusians in Ukraine were subject to rapid assimilation, with only 16,000 of them using Belarusian in daily communication.

=== Belarusian volunteers during the Russian-Ukrainian War ===
White-red-white flag with Columns of Gediminas in the form of a trident of the Belarusian diaspora in Ukraine, which is also used by the Kastuś Kalinoŭski Regiment

During the Russo-Ukrainian War Belarusian volunteers fought alongside Ukraine. The first foreign volunteer group in Ukraine was the Pahonia detachment, founded in 2014 during the war in Donbas. The following year, the tactical group "Belarus" was formed uniting Belarusian volunteers fighting in different battalions The Monument to the Belarusians who died for Ukraine in Kyiv is dedicated to the Belarusian volunteers who died during the Russian-Ukrainian War. On March 9, 2022, the creation of the Kastuś Kalinoŭski Battalion was announced which was later transformed into a regiment. On March 30, 2022, the beginning of the formation of another Belarusian unit, the Pahonia Regiment was announced which was part of the International Legion of Territorial Defence of Ukraine.

In June 2023, Valery Sakhashchyk, then defence minister of the United Transitional Cabinet of Belarus (a government-in-exile opposed to the de facto government of Alexander Lukashenko) informed about the creation of the 1st Separate Air Assault Company "Belarus", part of the 79th Air Assault Brigade. The Belarusian assault company was located in the Donetsk direction.

During the August 2024 Kursk Oblast incursion, volunteers of the TUR tank unit of the 225th Independent Assault Battalion also took part in the operation. The unit consists mainly of Belarusians.

== Location and number ==
In Ukraine, the number of Belarusians is estimated at over 275,000 (the 2001 Ukrainian Census). Most of the Belarusians diaspora in Ukraine appeared as a result of the migration of Belarusians to the Ukrainian SSR during the Soviet Union. Lviv has been an important center of Belarusian social and cultural life during the Russian Empire and interwar Poland. There are now Belarusian organizations in major cities like Lviv, Sevastopol in the Crimea, and others. A notable Ukrainian of Belarusian descent is Viktor Yanukovych, the fourth president of Ukraine.

== Notable people ==
- Valyantsin Byalkevich (1973–2014), footballer (FC Dynamo Kyiv)
- Alyaksandr Khatskevich (born 1973), football manager
- Siarhei Mikhalok (born 1972), musician (Lyapis Trubetskoy)
- Artem Milevskyi (born 1985), former footballer for Dynamo Kyiv and Ukraine
- Pavel Sheremet (1972–2016), journalist

== See also ==
- Belarus–Ukraine relations
- Belarusian language in Ukraine
- Ukrainians in Belarus
