= Dzianis Procharaŭ =

Belarusian-Ukrainian soldier and commander

- Дзяніс Прохараў
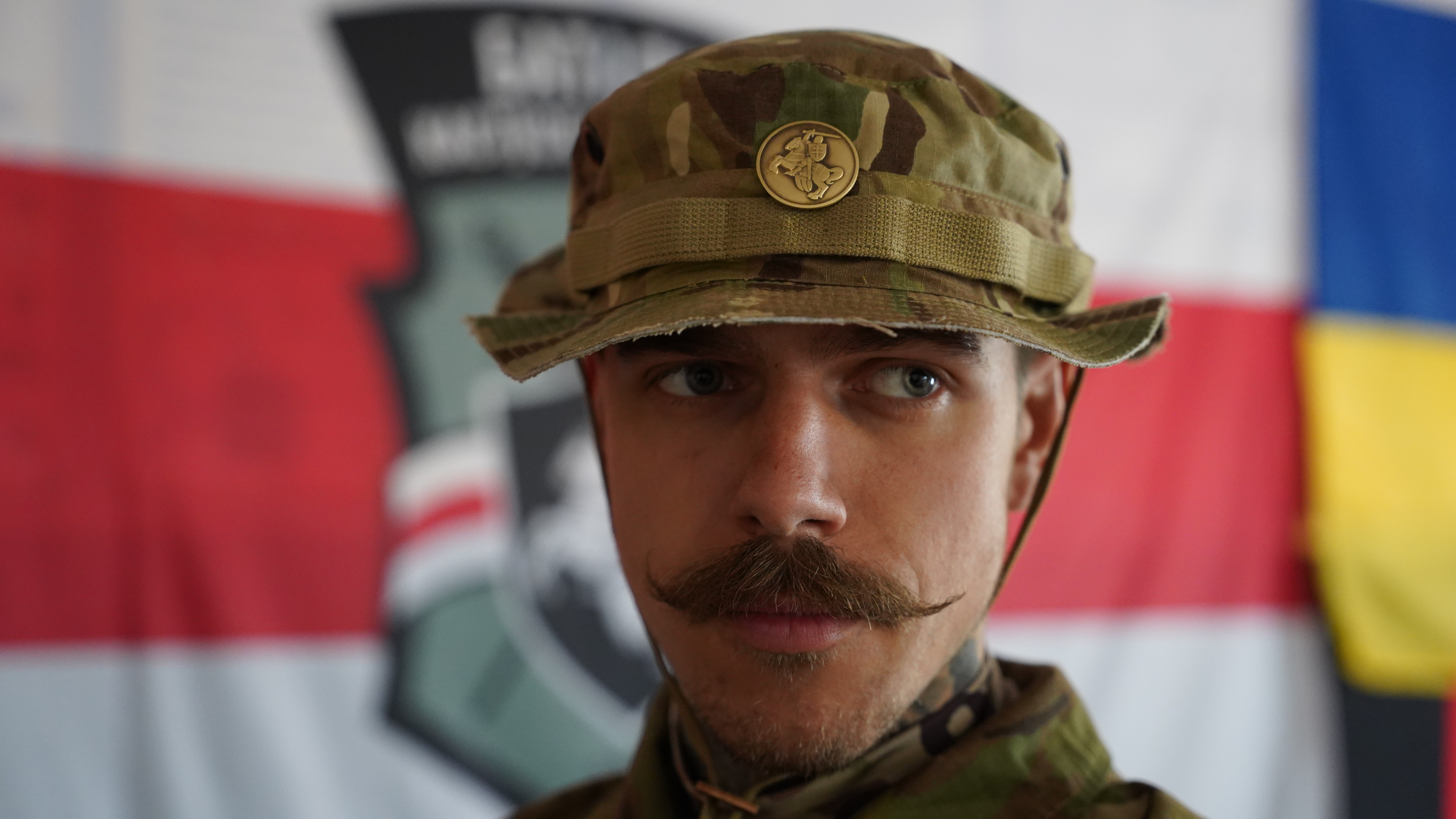
- Procharaŭ in April, 2022
- Born: 1995 (age 30–31); Belarus
- Military career
- Allegiance: Ukraine
- Branch: Territorial Defence Forces
- Rank: Commander (2022–2024)
- Nickname: Kit (Cat)
- Units: Azov Battalion (2014–2015); Tactical group "Belarus" (2015–2022); Kastuś Kalinoŭski Regiment (2022–Present)
- Conflicts: Russo-Ukrainian War; War in Donbas; Russian invasion of Ukraine; Battle of Kyiv; Battle of Bucha (WIA); 2023 Ukrainian counteroffensive

Dzianis Alyaksandravich Procharaŭ (Belarusian: Дзяніс Аляксандравіч Прохараў; born 19 July 1995), nom de guerre "Kit" (Belarusian: "Cat"), is a Belarusian soldier who served as the commander of the Kastuś Kalinoŭski Regiment under the Armed Forces of Ukraine. In April 2024, he was succeeded by Pavel Shurmei.

== Biography ==
In 2014, Procharaŭ left Belarus for Ukraine, where he joined the Azov Brigade. He became a physical training instructor and later completed a refresher course to become a tactical training instructor. In 2015, Procharaŭ fought near Marinka, Ukraine in the Donbas War as part of Tactical Group "Belarus".

In July 2019, information became public that Procharaŭ received Ukrainian citizenship.

Since the beginning of the Russian invasion of Ukraine, Procharaŭ has been fighting, including participating in the Battle of Kyiv, and the Battle of Bucha, where he received a shrapnel wound during the battle.

In 2026, he was sentenced in absentia to 25 years in prison and a large fine.
