= Shalt Not Kill (Russia) =

- Христиане против войны
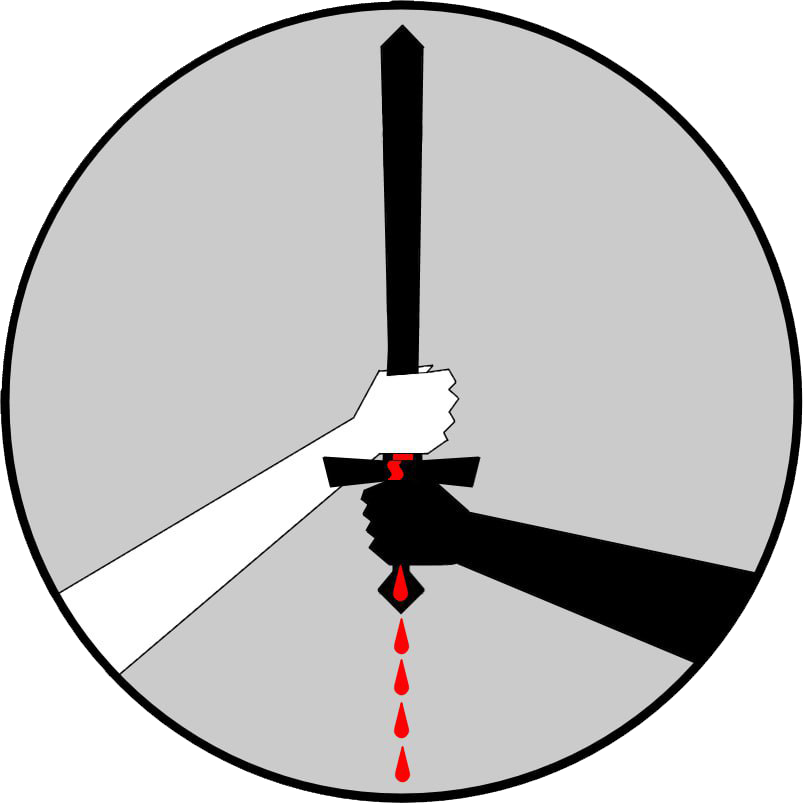
- Founded: march 2022
- Founder: Christian Vision (Belarus)
- Purpose: Anti-war, Peace
- Website: shaltnotkill.info

Shalt Not Kill (Russian: Христиане против войны) is an anti-war Christian initiative by the Christian Vision group. The initiative was formed in response to the full-scale Russian invasion of Ukraine in February 2022.

== History ==
Shalt Not Kill (Russia) emerged as one of the initiatives of the Belarusian Christian Vision group. Initially, it was a media group analysing the reaction of Christian communities in Russia, Ukraine, Belarus and other neighbouring countries to Russia's invasion of Ukraine. The group's members studied the methods of Christian resistance in Russia to military actions; religious propaganda used to justify aggression; structural changes in the confessional landscape of Russia and Ukraine against the backdrop of military actions, etc.

Since persecutions were used against citizens who expressed disagreement with the actions of Russian troops, the group got engaged in human rights activities, in particular, monitoring cases of persecution of Christians for their anti-war views and organising assistance to them.

== Activities ==
The initiative maintains several monitoring lists:

- Persecution of Christians by religious organisations and authorities for their anti-war position or support for Ukraine in defence against aggression;
- killed clergy and church workers of Christian churches in Ukraine;
- priests of the Russian Orthodox Church serving as chaplains in the Armed Forces of the Russian Federation;
- conscientious objectors to military service in Ukraine.

Various foreign media outlets have referred to these lists. The monitoring is also used by Russian independent media to assess repressive practices in Russia against believers' anti-war views.

The products of the initiative's research have been used by local and foreign human rights organisations, as well as scholars.

== Persecution and censorship ==
The initiative's website was blocked in Russia on 9 September 2023.

The initiative's Telegram channel was added to the list of extremist materials in Belarus.

A criminal case was opened against one of the initiative's members in Belarus for giving an interview to the Belsat TV station.

== Collaboration ==
The initiative collaborates with grassroots confessional, interfaith, and secular initiatives in Russia organising anti-war protests and resistance actions, incl. the Christmas Declaration initiative, the Peace to All project and the Feminist Anti-War Resistance. Joint activities are also carried out with the Ukrainian public organization for dialogue between the Orthodox churches of Ukraine, the Sophia Brotherhood.
