= Vadzim Kabanchuk =

Belarusian public figure and activist

- Вадзім Кабанчук
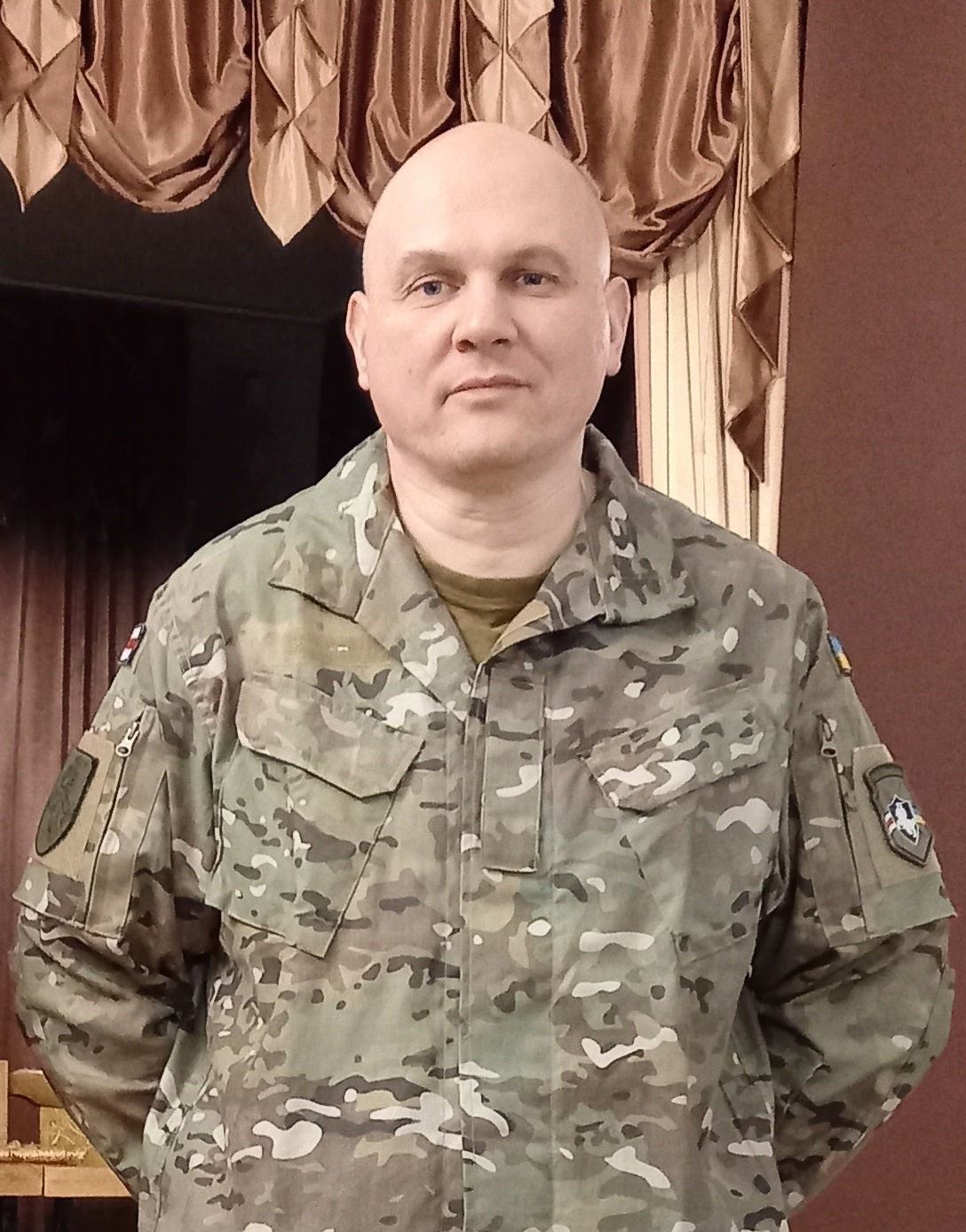
- Kabanchuk in 2024

Representative for Defense and National Security
- Incumbent
- Assumed office 1 August 2024
- President: Sviatlana Tsikhanouskaya
- Preceded by: Valery Sakhashchyk

Personal details
- Born: November 29, 1974 (age 51) Babruysk, Belarusian SSR, USSR
- Education: Belarusian National Technical University

Vadzim Mikhailavich Kabanchuk (Belarusian: Вадзім Міхайлавіч Кабанчук, also Vadim) is a Belarusian who has held political and military responsibilities as part of the Belarusian opposition. As a political activist, he was imprisoned for six months during 1997–1998 and for 10 days in 2011. Kabanchuk became deputy commander of the Kastuś Kalinoŭski Regiment during the 2022 full-scale Russian invasion of Ukraine and switched to the political role of Representative for Defense and National Security in the United Transitional Cabinet of Belarus in early August 2024. In 2026, he was sentenced in absentia to 25 years in prison and a large fine.

== Youth and education ==
Kabanchuk was born in Babruysk. In the 1990s, Kabanchuk was active in the Young Front. He graduated from the Belarusian State Polytechnic Academy.

== Political activism and repression ==
Kabanchuk participated in protests on 10 and 13 March 1997 during the Minsk Spring. He was charged under Article 186 Part 3, relating to street protests, and Article 187 Part 2, relating to resisting arrest, of the Criminal Code of Belarus. He was imprisoned from September 1997 to 27 March 1998 at Pishchalauski Castle. After his release, he continued his political activism as part of the Belarusian opposition, and was sentenced several times to administrative detention.

Kabanchuk lived for a few years, including 2001, in Belgium. He returned to Belarus and supported Alaksandar Milinkievič in the 2006 presidential election and Vital Rymasheuski in the 2010 presidential election. He participated in the 19 December 2010 Belarusian protests

On 13 February 2011, Kabanchuk was detained when returning to Belarus from Lithuania. The authorities found that he was transporting about 100 copies of opposition newspapers covering the aftermath of the 2010 election. He was sentenced to 10 days of arrest for having participated in the 19 December protests.

As of early 2012, Kabanchuk was a member of Belarusian Christian Democracy (BCD). On 21 March 2012, he was detained in Minsk. Other BCD activists travelling in the same car as Kabanchuk escaped.

== Military commander ==
Following the February 2022 full-scale Russian invasion of Ukraine, Kabanchuk became deputy commander of the Kastuś Kalinoŭski Regiment, a military structure of Belarusians within the Armed Forces of Ukraine.

== United Transitional Cabinet member ==
Kabancuhuk was appointed Representative for Defense and National Security in the United Transitional Cabinet of Belarus (UTC) on 3 August 2024. For compatibility with his new role, he shifted to reserve status in the Kalinoŭski Regiment.

Following his UTC appointment in August 2024, Kabanchuk stated that the Kalinoŭski Regiment had initially been invited to have a representative in the UTC in 2022, but had declined, seeing its role in Ukraine as its immediate priority. He stated that the regiment had received material help from the UTC. Among the projects started with his role as a member of the UTC, Kabanchuk cited a program to train volunteers in Ukraine.

Kabanchuk stated that the "Kalinoŭski movement", created in July 2024, is a sociopolitical structure associated with the regiment, with the intention of contributing to replacing the Lukashenko government. He said that to satisfy Ukrainian law, regiment members who participated in the Coordination Council resigned from the regiment.

== Points of view ==
In October 2022, Kabanchuk argued that supporters of Belarusian president Alexander Lukashenko were disoriented by Russian military losses during the 2022 Russian invasion of Ukraine and that both the general Belarusian population and the Belarusian military were opposed to the invasion as a result of the many wars that had taken place in Belarus.

In March 2023, he argued that for the goal of replacing the Lukashenko government, Belarusians who were at risk due to having participated in the 2020–2021 Belarusian protests should emigrate from Belarus, while those who could remain safely in Belarus should do so and prepare for "decisive events that [would] come soon". He recommended that those staying in Belarus should prepare the "material and technical base" for a political change, in groups of no more than three people, keeping their plans confidential.

In August 2024, Kabanchuk stated the Belarusian ammunition and military equipment had been transported to Russia for use in the Russian invasion of Ukraine, and that there was a risk of Belarusian armed forces also being used in the Russian invasion.
