= Kastuś Kalinoŭski Regiment =

Belarusian pro-Ukraine military unit

Kastuś Kalinoŭski Regiment (May 2022–present) Kastuś Kalinoŭski Battalion (March–May 2022)
- Полк Кастуся Калиновського; Полк Кастуся Каліноўскага
- Founded: March 2022
- Country: Ukraine
- Type: Foreign volunteer regiment
- Role: Spetsnaz
- Size: 300
- Part of: International Legion of the Defense Intelligence of Ukraine
- Patron: Kastuś Kalinoŭski
- Motto: "Liberation of Belarus through the liberation of Ukraine"
- Engagements: Russo-Ukrainian War; Russian invasion of Ukraine; Kyiv offensive; Battle of Kyiv; Battle of Irpin; Eastern Ukraine offensive; Battle of Sievierodonetsk (2022); Battle of Lysychansk; Battle of Bakhmut; 2023 Ukrainian counteroffensive
- Decorations
- Website: Website in English

Commanders
- Current commander: Pavel Shurmei
- Notable commanders: Dzianis Prokharaŭ (commander 2022–2024); Vadzim Kabanchuk (deputy commander); Aliaksiej Skoblia † (deputy commander); Ivan "Brest" Marchuk †; Pavel "Volat" † (company commander)

Insignia
- Flag

The Kastuś Kalinoŭski Regiment (Note: Ukrainian: Полк імені Кастуся Калиновського, romanized: Polk imeni Kastusia Kalynovs'koho; Belarusian: Полк імя Кастуся Каліноўскага, romanized: Połk imia Kastusia Kalinoŭskaha) (also known as simply Połk Kalinoŭskaha, the Kalinoŭski Regiment or Bel Warriors), formerly the Kastuś Kalinoŭski Battalion until May 2022, is a group of Belarusian opposition volunteers, which was formed during the Russo-Ukrainian War in order to defend Ukraine against the Russian invasion in 2022.

In March 2022, it was reported that more than a thousand Belarusians have applied to join the unit. According to its own statements, the battalion is not incorporated into the International Legion of Territorial Defense of Ukraine in order to preserve greater autonomy.

The unit is named after the Belarusian and Polish national hero Kastuś Kalinoŭski, who was a leader of the January Uprising in 1863 against the Russian Empire in Belarus and Lithuania.

The regiment is confirmed to have suffered thirteen killed as of March 2025.

== History ==
=== Russo-Ukrainian War ===
==== 2014–2022: War in Donbas ====
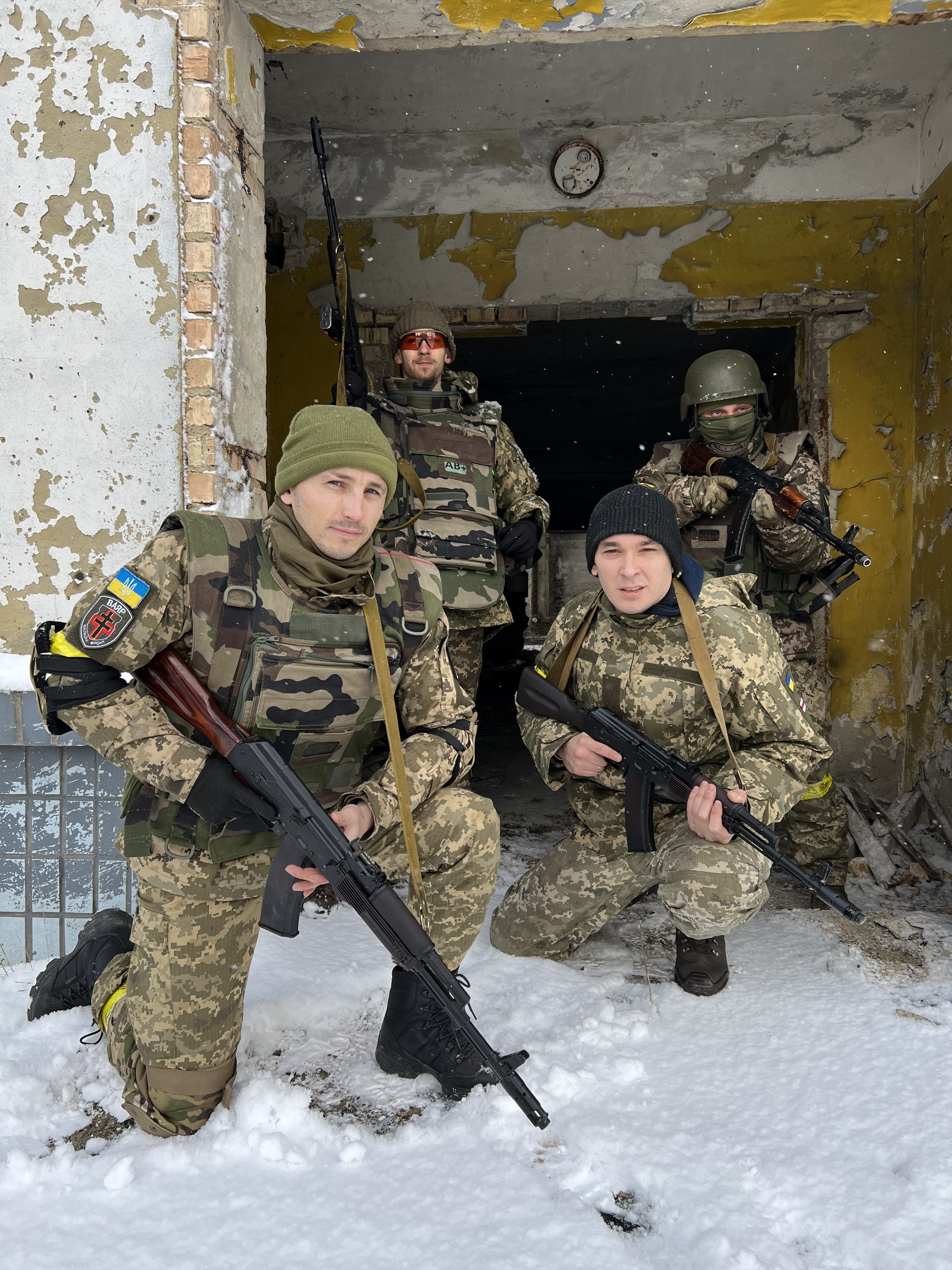
Kalinowski Regiment members, among them Dzyanis Urbanowicz, pose for a picture on 8 March 2022.

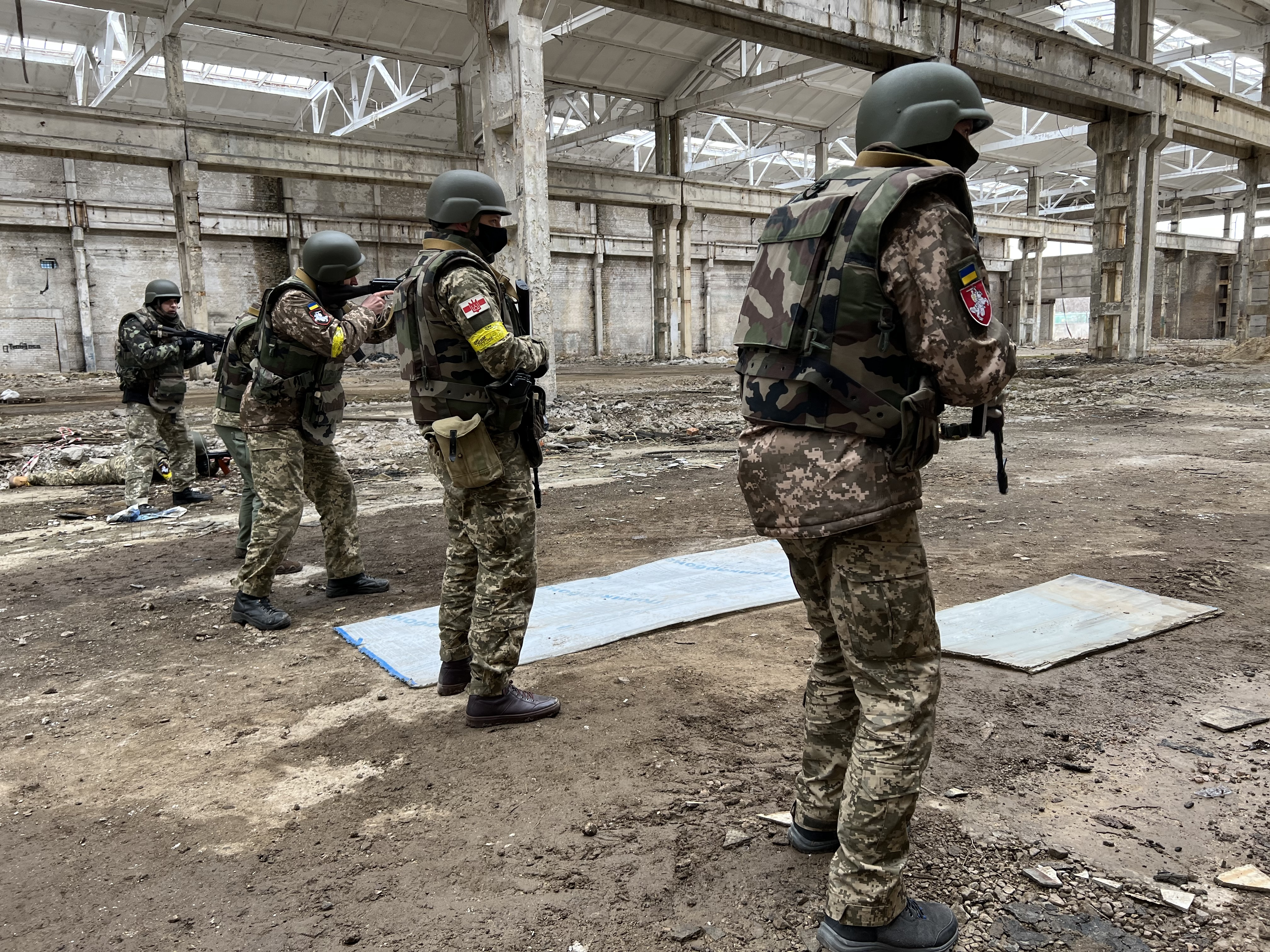
Members of the regiment training

The first foreign volunteer group in Ukraine during the Russo-Ukrainian War was the Pahonia Detachment, founded in 2014 during the war in Donbas. The following year, the tactical group "Belarus" was formed uniting Belarusian volunteers fighting in different battalions. The Monument to the Belarusians who died for Ukraine in Kyiv is dedicated to the Belarusian volunteers who died during the Russian-Ukrainian War.

==== 2022–present: Russian invasion ====
On 9 March, the creation of the Kastuś Kalinoŭski Battalion was announced. The battalion is named after Kastuś Kalinoŭski, (Note: Polish: Wincenty Konstanty Kalinowski) a 19th-century Belarusian leader of the 1863 January Uprising against the Russian Empire. It was reported that as of 5 March 2022, about 200 Belarusians had joined the battalion. The motto of the battalion is "Liberation of Belarus through the liberation of Ukraine," showing the volunteers' wish to also liberate Minsk from the Lukashenko regime.

On 13 March, the deputy commander of the battalion, nicknamed "Tur" (real name Aliaksiej Skoblia), was confirmed killed in the Kyiv offensive when his unit was ambushed. On 13 April, Ukrainian President Zelenskyy posthumously awarded Skoblia the title of Hero of Ukraine "for personal courage and heroism in defending the state sovereignty and territorial integrity of Ukraine, loyalty to the military oath."

On 25 March, it was reported the regiment had taken an oath and has been formally admitted to the Ukrainian Ground Forces. On 29 March, the Kastuś Kalinoŭski Battalion volunteers fought alongside Ukrainian soldiers to recapture Irpin. On 26 March, Dzmitry Apanasovich (call sign "Terror") was killed during fighting in Irpin.

On 1 April, it was reported that thousands of volunteers — many of whom were dissidents who had been arrested following the 2020–2021 Belarusian protests — had applied to be members of the battalion, but that vetting and equipping these volunteers had created a backlog that slowed down their deployment.

On 16 May, a company commander, identified as Pavel "Volat," was reported to have died during the war in Ukraine. The Belarusian newspaper Nasha Niva stated that Volat was the sixth Belarusian fighter killed since the start of the war. Volat was killed attempting to rescue four members of the regiment buried under rubble during the Battle of Bakhmut.

On 21 May, battalion commander, Dzianis Prokharaŭ (call sign "Kit") announced that the battalion would become a regiment comprising two separate battalions. This was presented as "a move to the next stage of building a [Belarusian] national military unit" which "tak[es] into account the scale of the tasks facing the Belarusian soldiers". The regiment would consist of three battalions, "Litvin", "Volat", and "Terror." Terror would later split from the Regiment and become an independent unit, the Terror Battalion.

On 17 June, it was announced that volunteers of the Regiment received state Ukrainian decorations "For Battle Merit" and "Ukraine Above All".

On 26 June 2022, four Regiment fighters were killed in a battle with the Russian armored group near Lysychansk, Vasyl Grudovik, Vasyl Parfyankov, Vadym Shatrov and Volat Battalion commander, Ivan Marchuk, nom de guerreBrest. Jan "Trombley" Durbeyka and Siarhei "Klesch" Dzogtsev were taken prisoners of war. On 11 July 2022, they were put on the POW exchange list.

In September 2022, the Ministry of Internal Affairs of Belarus recognized the Internet resources of the regiment as an extremist group.

In December 2022, the regiment received a BMP-2 armored vehicle, and in January 2023 a captured T-72 tank. The regiment announced the formation of the first mechanized unit.

On 9 March 2023, the anniversary of the regiment's formation occurred. Soldiers received awards from the Main Intelligence Directorate and the Rada BNR.

On 9 June 2023, the regiment met with the Verkhovna Rada committee "For a Democratic Belarus" to begin cooperating with Ukrainian officials on toppling the current government of Belarus and establishing a free and democratic republic friendly to Ukraine.

On 24 June 2023, shortly after the Wagner Group rebellion ended, the Regiment announced that they have "a large number of reserves in Belarus" and urged the Belarusian population to join them in an unspecified future operation to take control of Belarus. Later that day, in a joint statement with Sviatlana Tsikhanouskaya, the regiment urged the Belarusian population to "wait for the signal" for the commencement of an operation to liberate Belarus.

On 15 September 2023, the unit published a video of them walking freely and unopposed through the front-line settlement of Klishchiivka stating that all Russian forces had been pushed out of the settlement as part of the 2023 Ukrainian counteroffensive prior to any official statement of the village's liberation.

In autumn 2023, the group organized a "Path to Freedom" conference in Kyiv. They spoke to representatives of the Belarusian Democratic Force about the war.

In November 2024, Vasily Veremeychik was extradited from Vietnam to Belarus. This was after a request for asylum was denied by Lithuania because of his prior service in the Belarusian military.

== Structure ==
As of 2024 the regiment's structure is as follows:

- Regimental HQ and HQ Company
- 1st Infantry Battalion "Litvin"
- 2nd Infantry Battalion "Volat"
- 4th Infantry Battalion "KAŚCIUŠKA"
- Kosciuszko "Western" Unit
- Training company
- MP service
- Tactical Group "Kryutsov"
  - Aerial Reconnaissance and Adjustment
  - FPV Unit
  - Long-range Reconnaissance
  - Mortar Battery
- Engineering platoon
- Medical service
- Technical support platoon
- Financial service

Former units include:

- 3rd Infantry Battalion "Terror"

== Oath ==
Belarusian volunteers joining the regiment swear an oath upon joining. It was written by members of the battalion and first presented on March 25, Belarusian Freedom Day.

Belarus! My Motherland! I swear to free and defend You where I am now and where the fate of Your liberation will lead me. Fight to victory for Your freedom, as our ancestors fought against the Ordinian oppression of the Muscovites near Orsha, Smolensk, Polonka. It is merciless to chase the rootless people of Your lands, as they chased the warriors of the Grand Duchy of Lithuania and the Belarusian nobility, the scythemen of Kościuszko and the rebels of Kalinoŭski, the soldiers of the People's Republic and the partisans of the Resistance. Defend the blood of Your nation, the power of Your land and the divine spirit of Your existence. In the ranks of free brothers and in captivity, in the homeland and in exile, in battle and in the underground, let my hands grip the weapons until the gallows finish squeezing the necks of Your sons. Let the clang of my shutter not stop until the clang of the bars is heard behind the backs of Your heroes. Let me have enough life to take revenge for all your tortured, raped and killed children. Until the last shine of Your rivers in my eyes, while the trample of the Chase is heard in my heart. Live for You, die for You, and revive Your greatness. Long live Belarus! Live forever!

== Reactions ==
The battalion has been featured on public posters in Kyiv to illustrate Ukrainian-Belarusian military ties.

White-red-white flag with Columns of Gediminas in the form of a trident of the Belarusian diaspora in Ukraine, which is also used by the Kastuś Kalinoŭski Regiment

The creation of the battalion was endorsed by Belarusian opposition leader Sviatlana Tsikhanouskaya, who noted that "more and more people from Belarus join to help Ukrainians defend their country". Belarusian president Alexander Lukashenko, an ally of Russian president Vladimir Putin, called the volunteers "crazed citizens".

On 26 March, Deputy Head of the GUBOPiK of the Ministry of Internal Affairs of Belarus Mikhail Bedunkevich stated that a criminal case had been instituted in Belarus against 50 people from the Kastuś Kalinoŭski Battalion for participating in an armed conflict in a foreign state.

In August 2022, Ivonka Survila, Chairman of the Council of the BNR, expressed her support for the regiment after speaking to members in Kolin.

In November 2022, the European Parliament adopted a resolution expressing its support for the Kastus Kalinouski Regiment.

On September 25, 2024, the Supreme Court of Belarus, due to efforts of Belarus' Prosecutor General Andrei Shved, recognized the Kastuś Kalinoŭski Regiment as a terrorist organization.

In 2025, the Belarusian authorities sentenced five members of the Kalinoŭski Regiment in absentia to long prison terms and large fines. In 2026, similar sentences in absentia were handed down to five more regiment fighters, including Pavel Shurmei, Dzianis Procharaŭ and Vadzim Kabanchuk.

== Commemorations and honors ==
In Rivne, a street was named after Kastuś Kalinoŭski. in honor of the Belarusian volunteers.

On 12 April 2022, deputy commander Alyaksei Skoblya, was posthumously awarded the "Hero of Ukraine" medal.

On 17 June, several fighters of the regiment were awarded medals for "combat merit" and putting "Ukraine above all." One volunteer, Zmitser Apanasovich, was posthumously awarded a medal for "combat merit."

On 1 February 2023, members of the regiment were given medals for combat merit. The ceremony took place on 9 March, and was the first known ceremony of awarding Belarusian state awards for bravery on the battlefield since the time of the Polish-Lithuanian Commonwealth.

On 8 September, the council of the BNR gave awards to fourteen Belarusian volunteers, including members of the Kastuś Kalinoŭski Regiment. Among these, Miroslav Lozovsky was also posthumously awarded the Order of the Pahonia.

On 14 March 2025, the Regiment was awarded with "For Our Freedom and Yours" Steel Cross.

== Notable members ==
- Vadzim Kabanchuk, undersecretary battalion commander, one of the founders of the civic youth organization Zubr
- Aliaksiej Skoblia
- Pavel Shurmei, former Belarusian Olympic rower and world record holder
- Dzyanis Urbanovich, chairman of the Young Front

== See also ==
- Belarusian Volunteer Corps
- Pahonia Detachment
- Pahonia Regiment
- Tactical group "Belarus"
- Belarusian involvement in the Russian invasion of Ukraine
