= Aliaksiej Skoblia =

Belarusian soldier (1990–2022)

- Аляксей Скобля
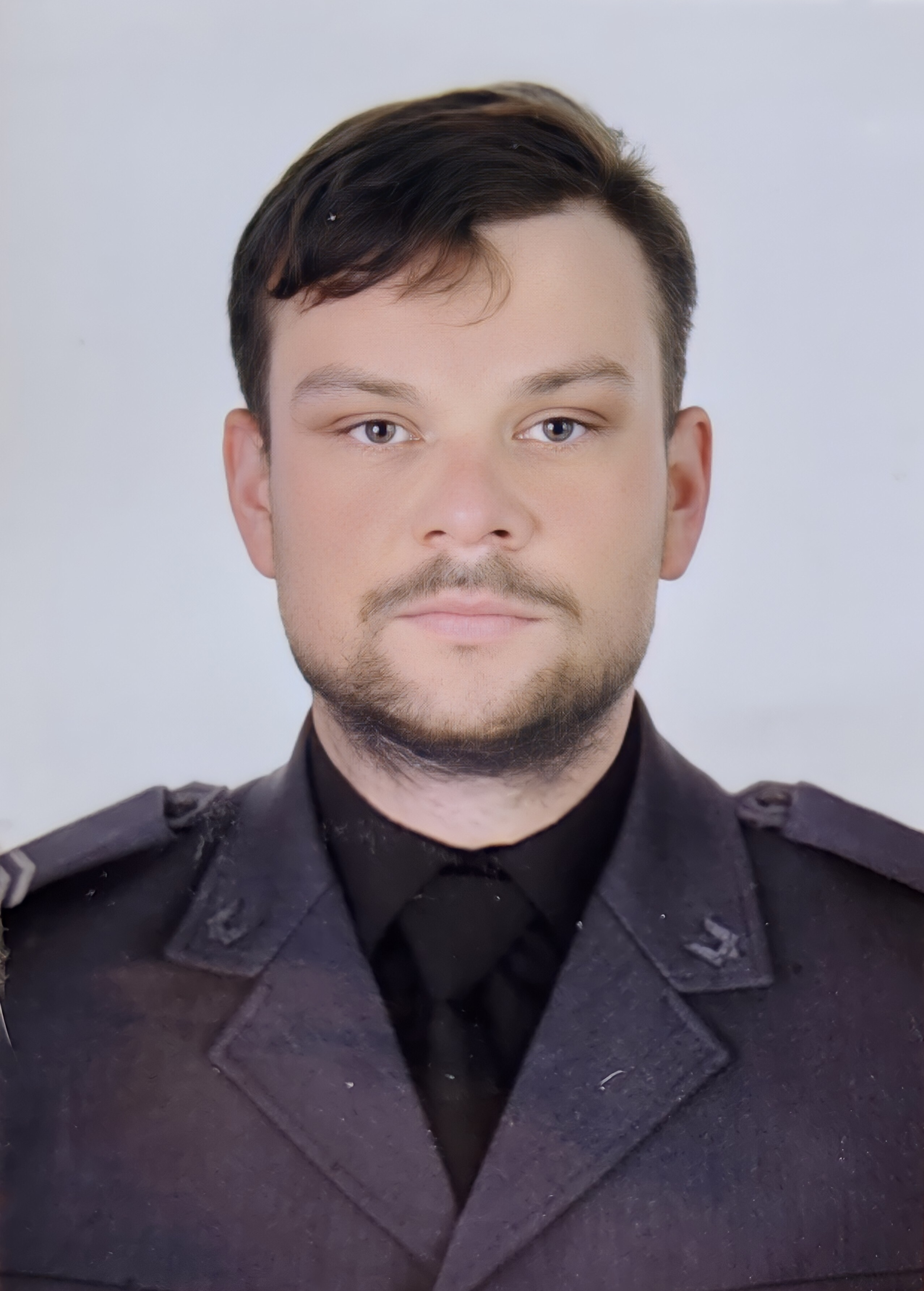
- Born: 14 March 1990; Minsk, Byelorussian SSR, Soviet Union (now Belarus)
- Died: 13 March 2022 (aged 31); Moshchun, Kyiv Oblast, Ukraine
- Military career
- Allegiance: Ukraine
- Branch: Territorial Defence Forces
- Rank: Senior sergeant
- Nickname: Тур (Bison)
- Unit: Kastuś Kalinoŭski Regiment
- Conflicts: Russo-Ukrainian War; War in Donbas; Russian invasion of Ukraine; Battle of Kyiv †
- Awards: Order of the Gold Star (posthumously) Medal of the Order of the Pahonia (posthumously)

Aliaksiej Mikalajevič Skoblia (Belarusian: Аляксей Мікалаевіч Скобля, 14 March 1990 – 13 March 2022), nom de guerre "Tur" (Тур, lit. "Bison"), was a Belarusian soldier who was deputy commander of the Kastuś Kalinoŭski Battalion under the Armed Forces of Ukraine. Skoblia died defending Kyiv from advancing Russian troops during the Battle of Kyiv in the 2022 Russian invasion of Ukraine. He was posthumously conferred the title of Hero of Ukraine by President of Ukraine Volodymyr Zelenskyy.

== Early life ==
Aliaksiej Mikalajevič Skoblia was born in Minsk, then part of the Soviet Union, on 14 March 1990. His mother was a kindergarten teacher and his father was a bus driver. From his childhood, he was interested in history.

After the ninth grade, he entered a car mechanic college in Minsk. He took part in the 2011 Belarusian protests against the government of Alexander Lukashenko, for which he was briefly arrested and fined.

== Volunteer in Ukraine ==
In 2015, Skoblia went to Ukraine as a soldier for the Ukrainian Armed Forces, eventually becoming a deputy commander. He was one of the leading members of the Belarusian opposition fighting for Ukraine in the war in Donbas. During 2021 and 2022, he served in the Special Operations Forces of Ukraine on a contract basis.

Following the 2022 Russian invasion of Ukraine, Skoblia became deputy commander of the newly formed Kastuś Kalinoŭski Battalion of Belarusian volunteers. On 13 March 2022, on the outskirts of Kyiv, his unit was ambushed by Russian troops. Skoblia died from his wounds while covering the retreat of his troops. He would have turned 32 the following day. In the week preceding his death, he had rescued ten wounded soldiers of the battalion using his professional medical skills.

== Memory ==
A farewell ceremony took place on 16 March 2022 at the Kyiv Crematorium, at which a specially-composed poem was read by one of the battalion's soldiers:

I will go through a steadily difficult path of endless and bloody war.

Let us raise the flag of noble glory over our mighty shoulders.

As Kastuś Kalinoŭski is my example, so is the fate of my comrade [Ilya] Litvin.

I will liberate Belarus through the liberation of Ukraine.

Like Tur, I swear to defend my comrades-in-arms in the heat of the battle.

Our honour will live forever in the memory of our homeland.

On 13 April 2022, Ukrainian President Volodymyr Zelenskyy posthumously awarded Skoblia the title of Hero of Ukraine "for personal courage and heroism in defending the state sovereignty and territorial integrity of Ukraine, loyalty to the military oath."

On 22 November 2022, the Rada of the Belarusian Democratic Republic in exile awarded Skoblia with the Medal of the Order of the Pahonia.
