= Christian Vision (Belarus) =

Belarusian Christian civic group

- Christian Vision for Belarus
- Formation: September 9, 2020; 6 years ago
- Region served: Belarus and diasporic communities
- Moderator: Natallia Vasilevich
- Website: https://belarus2020.churchby.info/

Christian Vision for Belarus (Belarusian: Хрысціянская візія, romanized: Chryścijanskaja vizija) is a Belarusian Christian civic group urging the protection of human rights and democratic principles amid the political crisis in Belarus and, since 2022, the war in Ukraine.

The group is a non-governmental organization composed of clergy, theologians and laity of the Orthodox, Greek-Catholic, Roman-Catholic and Protestant Churches in Belarus and its diaspora.

== Status and membership ==
Christian Vision was established on September 9, 2020 as a working group of the Coordination Council, a non-governmental body seeking a democratic transfer of power following the country's disputed 2020 presidential election. The group is interdenominational, and 24 lay and ordained people from Belarusian Christian denominations signed off on its establishment.

The organization is also registered as a public institution in Lithuania under the name Christian Vision for Belarus. Natallia Vasilevich serves as its moderator.

== Activities ==
Christian Vision seeks to monitor and raise awareness about faith-based and political persecution in Belarus, as well as acts of violence and unjust detention. Their reports are used to create Russian and English-language reports entitled "Monitoring of the Persecution on Religious Grounds During the Political Crisis in Belarus," which have been the basis of national and international news reporting.

The group has organized laity and clergy in support of nonviolence, restoration of the rule of law and the release of political prisoners.

The group encouraged theologians, ordained ministers and others in Belarus and abroad to develop a theological reflective perspective on the protests and persecutions in Belarus. One notable example was Sviatlana Tsikhanouskaya's letter to the Pope Francis in response to his Encyclical.

In March 2022, the group began researching anti-war initiatives in Russia, monitoring the persecution of Christians for their anti-war views and spearheading the Shalt Not Kill (Russia) initiative.

== Persecution ==
The work of Christian Vision has faced pushback from political and judicial authorities in Belarus.

In August and September 2023, two courts in Belarus designated the group's Telegram channel as an extremist material.

In October 2023, the group's Instagram, Facebook and Twitter accounts were recognized as extremist materials by the Kastryčnicki District Court of Vitebsk.

In 2025, Belarusian authorities designated Christian Vision as an extremist group.
