= Valery Sakhashchyk =

Belarusian lieutenant colonel and pro-democratic politician

- Валерый Сахашчык
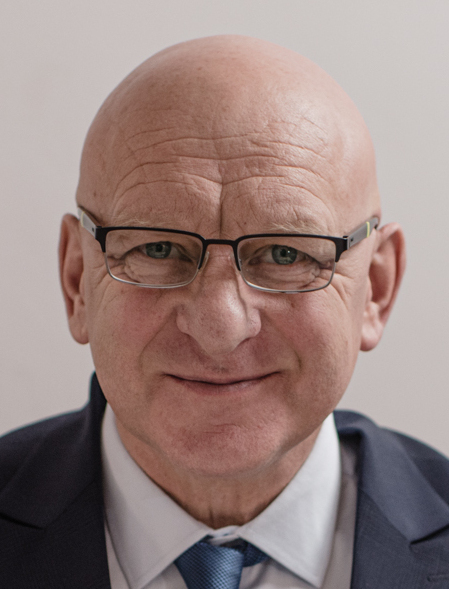
- Sakhashchyk in 2022

Member of the United Transitional Cabinet for Defence and Security
- In office 9 August 2022 – 1 August 2024
- President: Sviatlana Tsikhanouskaya
- Preceded by: Office established
- Succeeded by: Vadzim Kabanchuk

Personal details
- Born: Valery Stepanovich Sakhashchik; 13 August 1964 (age 61) Goshava, Drahichyn District, Byelorussian SSR, Soviet Union
- Party: Independent
- Education: Moscow Higher Military Command School

Military service
- Allegiance: Soviet Union (1987–1991); Belarus (1992–2002); Ukraine (2023–present)
- Branch/service: Airborne forces Special Forces of Belarus; Main Directorate of Intelligence (Ukraine)
- Rank: Lieutenant Colonel
- Battles/wars: Russian invasion of Ukraine

Valery Stepanovich Sakhashchyk (Belarusian: Валерый Сцяпанавіч Сахашчык, romanized: Valeryj Sciapanavič Sachaščyk, Russian: Валерий Степанович Сахащик; born 13 August 1964) is a former commander of the Belarusian 38th Separate Guards Air Assault Brigade. Following the 2022 Russian invasion of Ukraine, Sakhashchyk launched video appeals calling for Belarusian forces to refuse to participate in any attack against Ukraine. From 9 August 2022 to 1 August 2024, he was the effective defence minister of the Belarusian United Transitional Cabinet, a government-in-exile opposed to the de facto government of Alexander Lukashenko.

Sakhashchyk was involved in organizing the 1st Separate Air Assault Company "Belarus", a unit of Belarusian volunteers fighting within the 79th Air Assault Brigade of Ukraine. He also personally took part in military operations.

== Childhood and education ==
Valery Sakhashchyk was born on 13 August 1964 in Goshava, Drahichyn District, when Belarus was part of the Soviet Union. He and his family moved to Drahichyn when he started school. Sakhashchyk was an avid reader of adventure books involving travel and military conflict, motivating him to aim at a air force career.

Sakhashchyk studied at Moscow Higher Military Command School. He graduated with a gold medal.

== Soviet military career ==
Sakhashchyk's military career started by commanding a company in Zabaykalsky Krai. In the 1980s, he commanded a company in Perleberg, East Germany.

In 1992, he returned to Brest, where he was appointed Deputy Commander of the 2nd Paratrooper Battalion of the 38th Separate Guards Air Assault Brigade of newly independent Belarus, and promoted to Combatant after six months. In 1995, Sakhashchyk studied at the Military Academy of Belarus, after which he returned to the 38th Brigade as Deputy Brigade Commander, and then Brigade Commander.

Sakhashchyk resigned from his post in 2002, in response to what he described as "palace intrigues" in relation to reorganisation of the Belarusian armed forces.

== Construction ==
In 2007 Sakhashchyk started a family-owned construction business in Belarus, Poland and Germany, SK-BUD & Sahaty.

== Opposition ==
Sakhashchyk participated in the 2020–2021 Belarusian protests that followed the disputed 2020 Belarusian presidential election. He was seen in a protest in Brest on 16 August 2020, organising a group of 38th Brigade members that aimed to prevent confrontations between protestors and police from becoming violent. Sakhashchyk stated that he believed at the time that a legal approach within the Belarusian Constitution should have allowed citizens to defend their rights.

At a meeting of the Belarusian opposition in Berlin in July 2022, former military commander Vadim Prokopyev proposed that Sviatlana Tsikhanouskaya, the apparent winner of the 2020 presidential election and leader-in-exile of the Belarusian opposition, should play the role of British Queen Elizabeth and that a "Winston Churchill, head of the military cabinet" was needed in the role of prime minister. The name of Sakhashchyk emerged in the discussion and on 9 August 2022 he was appointed as the member for defence and security in the Belarusian United Transitional Cabinet, aimed at replacing the de facto Lukashenko government. The BBC referred to Sakhashchyk as "effectively the defence minister ... of the Belarusian opposition-in-exile".

Sakhashchyk stated that he saw his role in the Cabinet as being within a parliamentary republic with a separation of powers and checks and balances. He said that military resources included the Kastuś Kalinoŭski Regiment and "intelligence, surveillance and communications systems". He said that he hoped that a show of force would be enough to achieve a non-violent unity in Belarus by dialogue and that he would do his best to avoid a civil war scenario in Belarus. Friedrich Ebert Foundation researchers described Sakhashchyk's role as "train[ing] Belarusian combat units abroad", as a complement to Cabinet member Aliaksandr Azarau's role in training volunteers for "special operations".

On August 1, 2024 Sakhashchyk announced his resignation from the United Transitional Cabinet.

=== Russian invasion of Ukraine ===
After the Russian invasion of Ukraine began on 24 February 2022, Sakhashchyk published a video appeal calling for Belarusians to refuse to participate in the invasion. He argued that there were three reasons for refusing to participate: that Ukraine had never threatened Belarus; that the Ukrainian government was freely elected and not constituted of drug addicts or far-right nationalists; and that it would be illegal under the Belarusian Constitution for Belarusian forces to enter Ukraine. He stated in mid-March that no junior officers, sergeants or lower-ranked Belarusian soldiers wanted to fight in Ukraine.

In mid-March 2022, Sakhashchyk complemented the Ukrainian armed forces and territorial defence, stating that they had "exceeded all expectations".

In October 2022, Sakhashchyk published another video appeal, again calling for Belarusian armed forces to refuse to participate in a speculated attack on Ukraine. He asked if Belarusian forces would prefer to remain "highly respected members of society" rather than become criminals prosecuted in the International Criminal Court investigation in Ukraine. He expressed his worry that Belarusian casualties would lead to "decades" of enmity between Belarusians and Ukrainians.

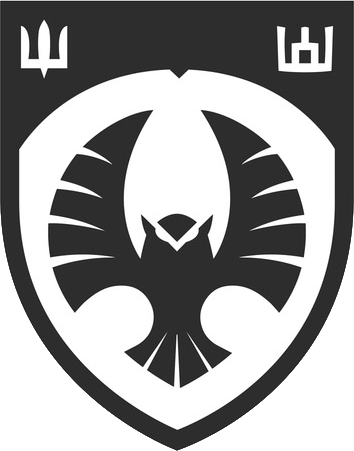
Emblem of the 1st separate amphibious assault company "Belarus"

In June 2023 it became known that Valery Sakhashchyk headed a separate Belarusian airborne assault company in the armed forces of Ukraine. The Belarusian company "has been carrying out combat missions in one of the most difficult front sectors in southeastern Ukraine for the second month, gaining combat experience necessary for the creation of a new, high-tech and highly effective Belarusian army". The 1st separate amphibious assault company of Belarusians is part of the 79th Air Assault Brigade.

On 24 June 2023, during the Wagner Group rebellion in Russia, Sakhashchyk released a video interpreting the rebellion as a sign that the Russian Federation would "fall apart sooner or later". He saw the situation as requiring a decision to either "use [the] historical chance and become a prosperous European country" or "lose everything". He called for the Belarusian military to assert Belarusian independence from Russia, to "unite the nation" and to "watch this space".
