= Natallia Vasilevich =

Belarusian theologian

- Наталля Васілевіч
- Born: March 15, 1982 (age 44); Minsk, Byelorussian SSR, Soviet Union
- Citizenship: Belarus
- Education: Belarusian State University; University of Bonn
- Occupations: Theologian; Human rights activist
- Years active: 2002–present
- Organization: Christian Vision
- Known for: Support of ecumenism in Belarus against war

Natallia Stsiapanauna Vasilevich (Belarusian: Наталля Сцяпанаўна Васілевіч; born 15 March 1982) is a Belarusian human rights activist and theologian. She is a leading member of the ecumenical movement in Belarus, and is known for her advocacy for religious freedom and the social responsibility of churches. Vasilevich currently acts as moderator of the Christian human rights group Christian Vision.

== Early life and education ==
Vasilevich was born on 15 March 1982 in Minsk, where she attended the Yakub Kolas Humanities Lyceum, graduating in 1999. She went on to study political science at the law faculty of the Belarusian State University between 1999 and 2004. Vasilevich subsequently obtained a master's degree in 2005 and a PhD in 2008, both in political science. After completing her studies, Vasilevich began working as a professor within the department of the theory and history of law at the Belarusian Institute of Legal Studies.

In 2014, Vasilevich received a master's degree in ecumenical studies from the University of Bonn in Germany, and from 2015 was a doctoral candidate within its philosophy faculty. In 2025, she successfully defended her dissertation on the preconciliar process of the Holy and Great Council of the Orthodox Church.

== Activism ==
Between 2002 and 2005, Vasilevich worked as the coordinator of the youth branch of the Brotherhood of the Three Martyrs of Vilnius, in addition to serving as a member of the coordination council of the Youth Union of the Belarusian Orthodox Church. Vasilevich was the co-founder and editorial board member of the magazine Politychnaya Sfera (lit. 'Political Sphere'), and co-founded the Orthodox portal Tsarkva (lit. 'Church'), which operated between 2004 and 2015.

Between 2007 and 2009, Vasilevich was a member of the administrative committee of the World Brotherhood of Orthodox Youth Syndesmos, representing Central Europe. Between 2010 and 2019, she worked for the Conference of European Churches, and acted as a member of its steering committee for the "Pathways to Peace" initiative.

In 2019, Vasilevich founded the interdisciplinary and interdenominational scientific journal Zbožža (lit. 'The Grain'), which addressed questions about Christianity in society and culture. From 2020, Vasilevich has acted as the moderator of the ecumenical initiative Christian Vision, which aims to unite various Christian denominations in Belarus who oppose the use of violence and repression by Belarusian authorities. Vasilevich criticised the response of the head of the Belarusian Orthodox Church, Metropolitan Benjamin, to the Russian invasion of Ukraine in 2022; he had declined to condemn the invasion and called on both sides to "make steps to each other". In 2025, the initiative was banned by the State Security Committee of the Republic of Belarus as an "extremist organisation". Vasilevich also oversees its projects including the Church and Political Crisis in Belarus and Christians Against War.

Since 2024, Vasilevich has been a member of the World Council of Churches' Commission for Ecumenical Education and Formation, serving until 2032.

In August 2026, it was announced that Vasilevich, alongside Protestant preacher Sergiy Melyanets, were added to Russia's Federal Wanted List at the request of the Belarusian government. A criminal case against her had been opened in April 2026, and Christian Vision was later designated as a foreign agent by the Russian government.

As of 2026, Vasilevich lives outside of Belarus. In November 2026, she rejoined the Conference of European Churches as a year-long programme officer on peace politics and ethics in Europe, focusing on the conflict in Ukraine.

== Writing ==
Between 2002 and 2019, Vasilevich published a blog, Pani z kadzilam (lit. 'The Lady with the Incense Burner'), where she wrote about church life, questions of faith, and social engagement. Vasilevich has written various articles about politics, human rights, religious freedom, the role of the church in the state, and the role of Christian communities in the context of the 2020–2021 Belarusian protests. Her research focuses on the sociology of religion, the theology of civic engagement, and ecumenical dialogue.
