= Pahonia Detachment =

- Загін «Погоня» Атрад «Пагоня»
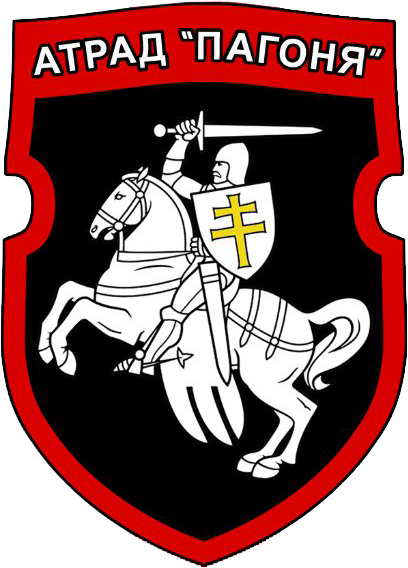
- Pahonia Detachment shoulder sleeve insignia
- Active: 2014–2016
- Country: Ukraine
- Branch: Ukrainian Ground Forces
- Type: Infantry
- Size: Detachment, 150-250 men
- Garrison/HQ: Volyn oblast
- Motto: Long Live Belarus!
- Engagements: War in Donbas: Battle of Ilovaisk

Insignia
- White-red-white flag

The Pahonia Detachment (Note: Ukrainian: Загін «Погоня», romanized: Zahin "Pohonia"; Belarusian: Атрад «Пагоня», romanized: Atrad "Pahonia") was a formation of the Ukrainian Ground Forces.

The detachment received its name in honor of the Pahonia, the coat of arms of the Grand Duchy of Lithuania, which in 1991-1995 was the state emblem of Belarus. In 1995, following the results of a 1995 Belarusian referendum held on the initiative of Alexander Lukashenko, the coat of arms was changed and has since been actively used by the Belarusian opposition.

== Formation ==
The formation of the unit began in June 2014 on the territory of the Volyn oblast, in far northwestern Ukraine. One of the organizers of the detachment was a Ukrainian politician from Volyn Ihor Huz. He told reporters that the formation of the detachment as a combat unit took place in a specially equipped camp in Volyn. However, the detachment did not participate in hostilities as a separate unit. The stated purpose of the formation of the detachment was to train fighters to participate in hostilities in eastern Ukraine in the ranks of the Ukrainian territorial defense battalions

A framework was adopted to maintain secrecy, so that the special services of Belarus could not figure out the identities of participants. However, some, such as Yan Melnikov, openly filmed and declared themselves as volunteers in the ranks of the Armed Forces of Ukraine.

By July 2014, the first groups of fighters of the detachment had arrived in the east of Ukraine.

== Combat ==
The detachment took an active part in the battle of Ilovaisk, during which fighters with the call signs "Brest", "Moustached" and "Bugor" distinguished themselves, who managed to knock out a T-72 tank and two ballistic missile defense systems of the self-proclaimed Donetsk People's Republic (DPR) in street battles.

As of September 2014, according to the statement of the representative of the detachment, Tatyana Yelova, some of the unit's fighters were part of the Ukrainian battalions on the front line, with no reported losses among them. However, in the winter of 2014-2015, reports appeared of the death of 12 fighters in battles.

In September 2016, the “Pahonia Detachment” announced the termination of its participation in hostilities in eastern Ukraine. Members created the organization “Public Sector of the Pahonia Detachment”, which, first of all, is engaged in multifaceted aid to Belarusian volunteers.

== Persecution in Belarus ==
Law enforcement agencies of Belarus have made statements more than once that Belarusian citizens, whose participation in the war in eastern Ukraine has been proven, will be punished under the law on mercenarism, which carries the penalty of 3 to 7 years of imprisonment. In early October 2014, the chairman of the Belarusian KGB, Valery Vakulchik, reminded citizens of their responsibility for illegal actions under the legislation of the republic. In addition, law enforcement agencies have repeatedly appealed to Belarusians with the appeal: not to give in to offers to participate in hostilities in the Donbas on either side.

== See also ==
- Kastuś Kalinoŭski Regiment
- Tactical group "Belarus"
