= Monument to the Belarusians who died for Ukraine =

Monument in Kyiv, Ukraine

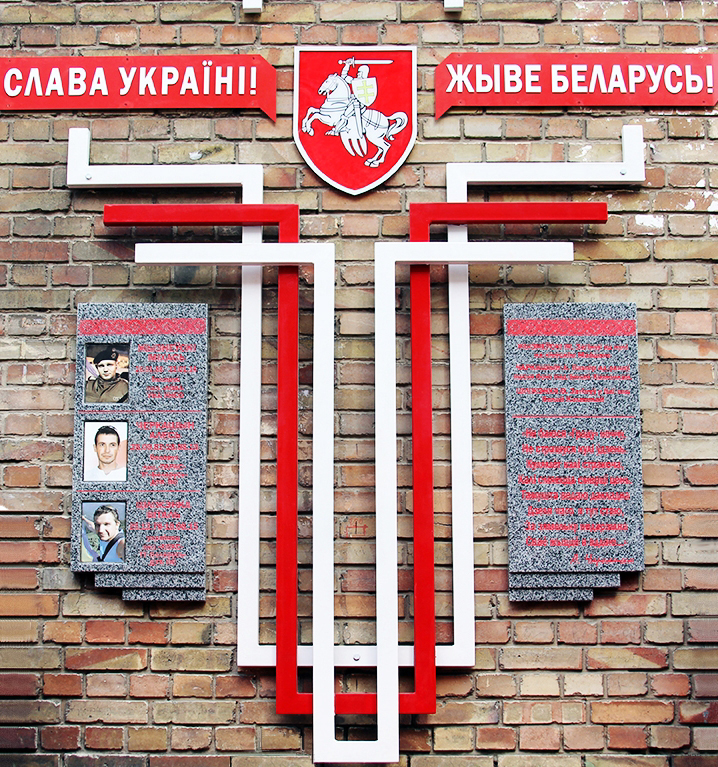
Monument to the Belarusians who died for Ukraine

The Monument to Belarusians who died for Ukraine in Kyiv is the memorial sign dedicated to the Belarusians who died during the events at Euromaidan and Russian-Ukrainian war. The memorial was opened on March 28, 2016. It is located on the building number 22 on the Belarusian street in Kyiv.

== Review ==
The monument is made in the colors of the 1918 national flag of Belarus (White-red-white) and includes an image of the Belarusian national emblem "Pahonia" (Pursuit).

At the memorial sign posted the names and photos of three persons:

- Mykhailo Zhyznevskyi, who died during the Revolution of Dignity from a bullet;
- Ales Charkashyn, who fought in the Tactical group "Belarus" and was killed in Donbas in August 2015 during the Anti-Terrorist Operation;
- Vital Cilizhenka, who fought in the Tactical group "Belarus" and was killed in Donbas in August 2015 during the Anti-Terrorist Operation.

The author of the monument is Hlib Hrzhabovsky. The sculptor's son was killed during the Battle of Donetsk Airport. Hrzhabovsky agreed to participate in the project as a volunteer.

In 2021, on the 507th anniversary of the Battle of Orsha, another plaque was added to the monument with the name of fallen volunteer and paramedic Mykola Ilin.
