= Tactical group "Belarus" =

Volunteer military unit in Ukraine

- Belarusian: Тактычная група «Беларусь» Ukrainian: Тактична група «Білорусь»
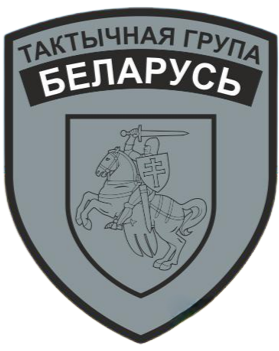
- Active: June 2015–March 2022
- Disbanded: Reformed as Kastuś Kalinoŭski Battalion (2022)
- Country: Ukraine
- Branch: Right Sector Ukrainian Volunteer Corps (2015); Kastuś Kalinoŭski Battalion (2022)
- Size: Variable

Tactical Group "Belarus" is a group of volunteers from Belarus who were involved in the Russo-Ukrainian War's Donbas theater. They fought on the side of Ukraine, first as part of the Right Sector Ukrainian Volunteer Corps, and later as part of various formations of the Ukrainian volunteer battalions and the Armed Forces of Ukraine.

== History ==
=== Early activity ===
Belarusian volunteers had been involved in the war in the Donbas since the beginning of hostilities in the spring of 2014. In the same year, a group of Belarusian volunteers created a detachment called the Pahonia Detachment. This group had 50 members by July 2014, 15 of whom had been in the conflict prior to Pahonia's formation. Belarusian volunteers took part in the Battle of Avdiivka in 2014.

Pahonia detachment was disbanded in 2016. This group should not be confused with the Pahonia Regiment which was formed as a special purpose regiment after the 2022 Russian invasion of Ukraine.

=== Creation and battle path ===
The Belarus Tactical Group was established on August 8, 2015, after negotiations with Belarusian activists and the leadership of the Ukrainian Volunteer Corps Right Sector. Its fighters fought in the battles at Butivka mine, Pisky, Volnovakha, and Marinka.

In mid-August 2015, near Volnovakha, the group fought a battle in which two volunteers, Vitaliy Tilizhenko and Ales Cherkashin, were killed.

On March 9, 2022, during the Russian invasion of Ukraine, the Tactical group "Belarus" announced in its social networks that the Kastus Kalinouski Battalion had been formed, which was later transformed into a regiment.

== Personnel ==
The total number of soldiers who served in the formation is unknown. There was a large influx of Belarusian volunteers in the initial stages of the war, possibly numbering more than 300. In early 2022, just prior to the Russian Invasion of Ukraine, the group had dwindled to about 40 members. The invasion triggered a new wave of volunteers. With 200 new volunteers showing up in 3 days and another 300 on the way, it became necessary to reorganize the group into the Kastuś Kalinoŭski Battalion on March 5, 2022.

Notable members of the group includes ex-political prisoner Eduard Lobau, Belarusian opposition activist Yan Melnikov, as well as fighters with the nicknames "Warrior", "Bison" and "Tour".

== Prosecution in Belarus ==
The law enforcement agencies of Belarus have repeatedly stated that citizens whose participation in the war in eastern Ukraine is proven will be punished under the "Mercenary" criminal article, the sanction of which can reach from 3 to 7 years in prison.

In May 2016, Alina Fortuna, a fighter of the Belarus tactical group, was deported from Belarus.

The page of the tactical group "Belarus" on Facebook and "VKontakte" is banned in Belarus.

In September 2022, the Belarusian Ministry of Internal Affairs recognized the Internet resources of the tactical group and other Belarusian military formations in Ukraine as an extremist group.

== Losses and commemoration ==
On March 28, 2016, a Monument to the Belarusians who died for Ukraine was unveiled in Kyiv. It lists the names of Mykhailo Zhyznevsky, who died during the Euromaidan events, as well as Ales Cherkashin and Vitaly Tilizhenko, two volunteers of the Belarus tactical group who were killed in action.

In February 2017, the exhibition "Ukrainian East" opened at the National Museum of the History of Ukraine in the Second World War. The exposition also includes items used by fighters of the tactical group "Belarus" as well as a white-red-white flag, a bulletproof vest of Alexander Cherkashin and a helmet of Vitaly Tilizhenko.

== Honors ==
On September 4, 2015, a number of fighters of the tactical group "Belarus", in particular fighters with the nicknames "Doc", "Belarus" and "Lion" were awarded the Ukrainian Orthodox Church of the Kyiv Patriarchate Medal "For Sacrifice and Love for Ukraine". Cherkashin and Tilizhenko received these awards posthumously.

Ales Cherkashin was awarded the Order of the People's Hero of Ukraine.

In October 2016, a fighter with the nickname "Zubr" received the award "For the sacrifice of the Ukrainian people."

== See also ==
- Kastuś Kalinoŭski Regiment
