= Pahonia Regiment =

- Білоруський полк «Погоня» Biloruśký polk "Pohoňa"; Беларускі полк «Пагоня» Biełaruski połk "Pahonia"
- Pahonia regiment chevron
- Active: 30 March 2022 - 1 July 2023
- Country: Ukraine
- Branch: Territorial Defense Forces
- Type: Foreign volunteer regiment
- Role: Territorial defence
- Size: Unknown
- Part of: International Legion of Territorial Defence of Ukraine
- Engagements: Russo-Ukrainian War; 2022 Russian invasion of Ukraine; Eastern Ukrainian offensive; Battle of Bakhmut
- Website: Official Telegram channel

The Pahonia Regiment (Note: Ukrainian: Білоруський полк «Погоня», romanized: Biloruśký polk "Pohoňa", Belarusian: Беларускі полк «Пагоня», romanized: Biełaruski połk "Pahonia".) was a group of Belarusian opposition volunteers, which was formed to defend Ukraine against the 2022 Russian invasion.

In July 2023, Radio Free Europe/Radio Liberty reported that the Pahonia Regiment ceased to exist.

== History ==
On March 30, 2022, political activist Vadzim Prakopieu announced the beginning of the formation of the Belarusian Pahonia Regiment as part of the International Legion of Territorial Defence of Ukraine. On March 31, 2022, Belarusian opposition leader Sviatlana Tsikhanouskaya announced the unit's formation via social media.

The regiment was created on the initiative of Belarusian officers, many of whom had served already in the Pahonia detachment during the War in Donbas (2014–2022). Its recruiting center is located in Warsaw.

In June 2022, it became known that the first group of fighters of the Pahonia Regiment signed contracts with the Special Operations Forces of Ukraine. In the same month, "Pahonia" became known as "special purpose regiment". The regiment's fighters are trained by American Matthew Parker, one of the instructors of the International Legion of Territorial Defence of Ukraine.

On September 14, 2022, Vadzim Prakopieu, one of the founders of the regiment and assistant commander, left the regiment.

On October 25, 2022, it became known that the air reconnaissance team of the Pursuit Regiment had transferred to the Kastuś Kalinoŭski Regiment, another unit of Belarusian volunteers fighting for Ukraine.

On October 28, 2022, the Ministry of Internal Affairs of Belarus recognized the Pahonia Regiment as an "extremist group". They are among the list of 625 persons to be deemed as extremists.

In November 2022, fighters of the Pahonia Regiment, together with Belarusians permanently living in Ukraine, founded the public association "Pahonia". Kickboxer Vitaly Gurkov became its director.

In November 2022, the European Parliament adopted a resolution expressing its support for the Pahonia Regiment.

In July 2023, Radio Free Europe/Radio Liberty reported that the Pahonia Regiment ceased to exist.

== Losses ==
On September 26, 2022, in the Battle of Bakhmut in the Donetsk region, Alyaksei Veshchavaylau, a fighter of the Pahonia Regiment, was killed.
