= Kadyrovites =

Paramilitary and military units in Chechnya

Kadyrovtsy
- Кадыровцы
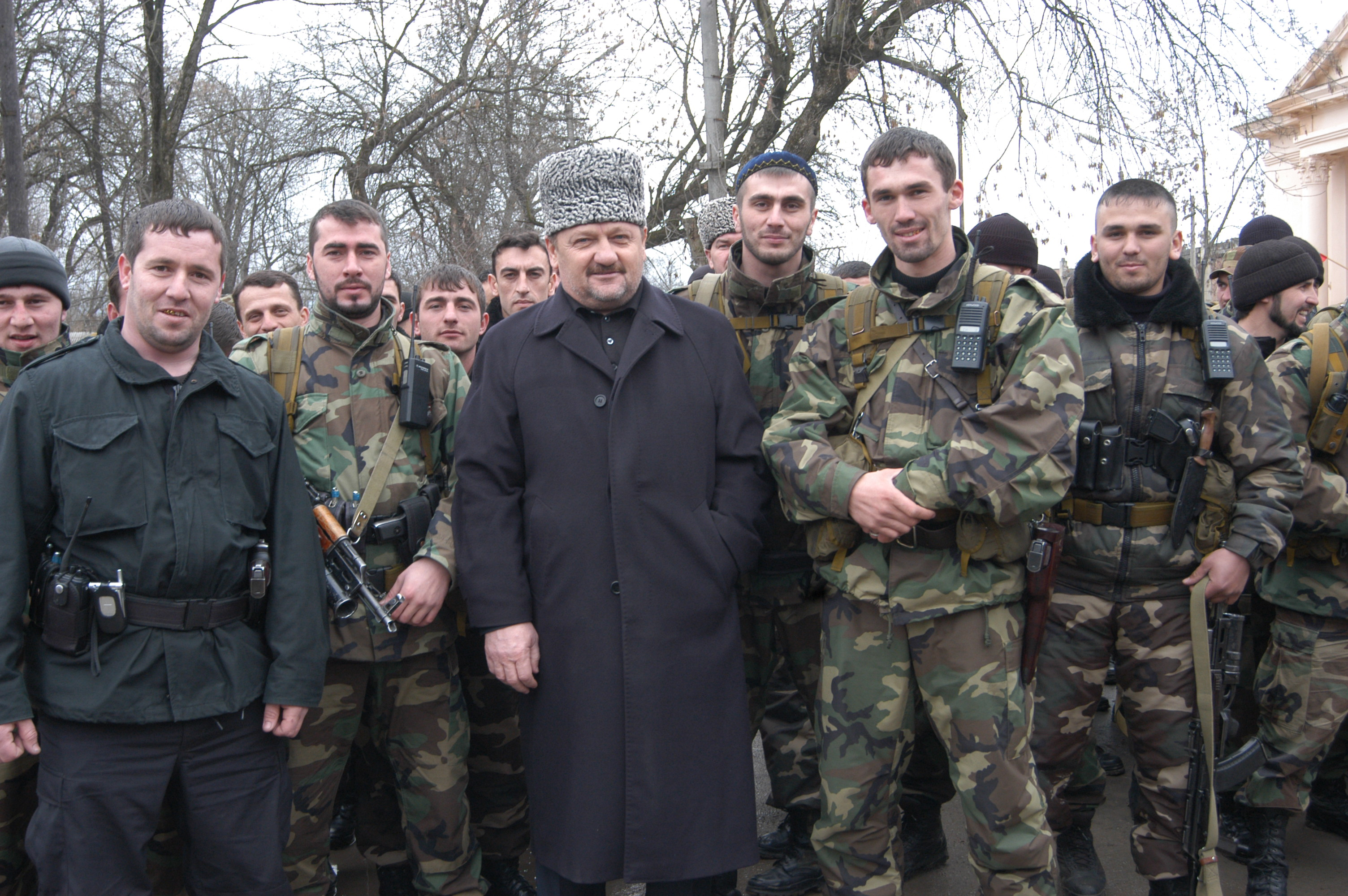
- Akhmad Kadyrov with several Kadyrovtsy, including Magomed Daudov (to his left), on February 28, 2004.
- Active: 1996 - Present
- Country: Russia
- Allegiance: Chechnya
- Part of: Federal Security Service (2000–2004); Ministry of Internal Affairs (Chechnya) (2004–2016); National Guard of Russia (2016–present)
- Patron: Akhmad Kadyrov
- Engagements: Second Chechen War; Insurgency in the North Caucasus; Syrian civil war; Russian intervention; Russo-Ukrainian war; War in the Donbas; Russian invasion of Ukraine; Wagner Group rebellion

Commanders
- General of the Army: Ramzan Kadyrov

Kadyrovites or Kadyrovtsy (Russian: Кадыровцы) or Akhmat (Russian: Ахмат) is an informal term for Chechnya-based detachments of the National Guard of Russia ("Rosgvardiya"), Russian Ministry of Internal Affairs, and the Russian Ministry of Defence. The name refers to Akhmad Kadyrov, 1st President of the Chechen Republic and father of Ramzan Kadyrov. While technically subordinated to Russian state agencies, they enjoy a special treatment and some describe them as "Kadyrov's private army". Some Kadyrovite units are in charge of guarding Chechnya oil fields and Tsentaroi, now Akhmat-Yurt, Kadyrov's home village.

In 2015 BBC reported that a considerable part of Kadyrovites were Chechen Republic of Ichkeria militants pardoned by Russian president Vladimir Putin under the word of Ramzan Kadyrov, with their numbers informally estimated in the range of 10,000–30,000.

The Kadyrovites have been criticized as being Ramzan Kadyrov's private army, and have been accused of committing widespread human rights abuses such as kidnapping, forced disappearances, torture and murder. Critics claim the Kadyrovites use extrajudicial punishment to cement Kadyrov's autocratic rule. By the mid-2000s they surpassed Russian federal servicemen as the most feared organization among Chechnya's civilian population. Under Kadyrov's orders, the Kadyrovites committed anti-gay purges in Chechnya. The Kadyrovites have also been involved in international conflicts including the Syrian Civil War in 2017 and the Russian invasion of Ukraine.

== Notable units ==
- Mobile special purpose detachment "Akhmat-Grozny", OMON "Akhmat-Grozny" (Russian: Отряд мобильный особого назначения «Ахмат-Грозный», ОМОН «Ахмат-Грозный»), Rosguard
- 141st Special Motorized Regiment, Rosguard
- Special Rapid Response Unit "Akhmat", Rosguard
- 78th Motorized Special Purpose Regiment "North-Akhmat", Ministry of Defence
- Spetsnaz "Akhmat", commanded by Apti Alaudinov, a volunteers' unit under the Ministry of Defence
- Akhmat Kadyrov Special Police Regiment, Ministry of Internal Affairs
- 249th Separate Special Motorized Battalion South of the 46th Separate Operational Brigade of the Russian National Guard
- 270th Akhmat-Kavkaz Motorized Rifle Regiment, 42nd Motorized Rifle Division, 58th Guards Combined Arms Army

== History ==
=== Militia ===
After Akhmad Kadyrov's defection to the Kremlin side in 1999, he and his followers fought for Russia against Maskhadov government troops and Islamist insurgents. The return of Russian rule over Chechnya was declared in July 2000, beginning the "guerrilla phase" of the conflict. Kadyrov was appointed as acting President of the Chechen Republic by Russian president Vladimir Putin, and was elected President of the Chechen Republic on 5 October 2003. The Kadyrovites acted as bodyguards to Kadyrov, who was the target of several assassination attempts. The security detail was headed by Movladi Baisarov.

Technically still a personal militia, the Kadyrovites functioned as an unofficial part of the Chechen Republic's state police, without legal status in either the republican or federal government. In May 2003, the group established effective control over the Chechen OMON, then estimated at 300 men, which had been considered one of the strongholds of anti-Kadyrov opposition. It was led by Musa Gazimagomadov, who died in a road accident under "strange circumstances". Afterwards, the Kadyrovite OMON was run by Ruslan Alkhanov, a former rebel commander amnestied just a year before, and who later became the Chechnya's Interior Minister.

=== Legalization ===
Kadyrov was killed on 9 May 2004 in the 2004 Grozny stadium bombing, in what is considered to be a deliberate assassination. Control of the Kadyrovites passed to his son, Ramzan Kadyrov, who was second-in-command of the militia. At that point, the backbone of the militia still consisted of former separatist fighters (more than 70% in 2004, according to the Russian military sources), and their allegiance to the new leader was questioned. Many continued serving as Kadyrovites under Ramzan due to implicit threats on their relatives' welfare; coercion was commonly used in Chechnya to demand compliance. Hostage-taking in particular was widespread and affected many in the country, including former rebel Minister of Defence Magomed Khambiyev.

Shortly after Akhmad Kadyrov's death, the unit of the Kadyrovites responsible for his protection was formally disbanded. Most of the remaining units were integrated into Russian law enforcement agencies and security authorities in Chechnya under the Ministry of Internal Affairs. Later two Kadyrovite units were formed: the "Akhmad Kadyrov" Second Road Patrol Regiment of the Police (PPSM-2, Kadyrov Regiment), and the regiment for the protection oil and gas objects informally known as Neftepolk ("Oil Regiment"), headed by the Kadyrov's cousin Adam Delimkhanov.

By 2006, the total number of Kadyrovites, who by then included the PPSM-2, the Oil Regiment, and so-called Anti-Terrorist Centers (commanded by Muslim Ilyasov), was no longer being disclosed. An intern at Memorial estimated that they numbered around 5,000 people, as did a 2007 a similar Reuters estimate.

On 29 April 2006, Ramzan Kadyrov officially disbanded his security service, saying on television that "These structures no longer exist, and those calling themselves Kadyrovites are impostors and must be punished in accordance with the law." Some of the Kadyrovite gunmen were completely integrated into Chechen government power structures, while others, estimated to number at least 1,800, continued serving in semi-legal paramilitary formations. The ATCs were quickly closed down, and some members transferred to newly formed battalions: Sever (North, led by Alibek Delimkhanov and made up of an estimated 700 men) and Yug (South, led by Muslim Ilyasov and made up of an estimated 500 men).

The Kadyrovites were rearmed and given heavy equipment, such as armoured personnel carriers they previously did not have. Observers have considered that their recognition and legalization as a law enforcement unit was implemented by the Russian government to redeploy some federal troops in Chechnya to the neighboring state of Dagestan, where the Islamist insurgency had not been contained. In 2007, Ramzan Kadyrov became the new President of the Chechen Republic and now controlled all Chechen Interior Ministry forces; the top seats of his government were occupied by the former Kadyrovite commanders.

In 2016, after a series of reforms, most of the Russian internal military and paramilitary troops were placed under the command of the newly created National Guard of Russia (also known as the Rosgvardiya). Chechen internal troops were placed under nominal control of the National Guard, although still under direct control of Kadyrov. Researcher Gordon M. Hahn, on his blog, and Russian political scientist Gleb Pavlovsky, who heads the analytics department of the Center for Political Technologies (CPT), said that one of Vladimir Putin's objectives was to limit Kadyrov's power over his troops by placing them under the control of the National Guard, which respond directly to Putin.

=== Syria ===
As part of Russian intervention in the Syrian civil war, Kadyrovite police units were deployed on the ground in Aleppo to "preserve order" and engage in civic outreach.

=== Ukraine ===
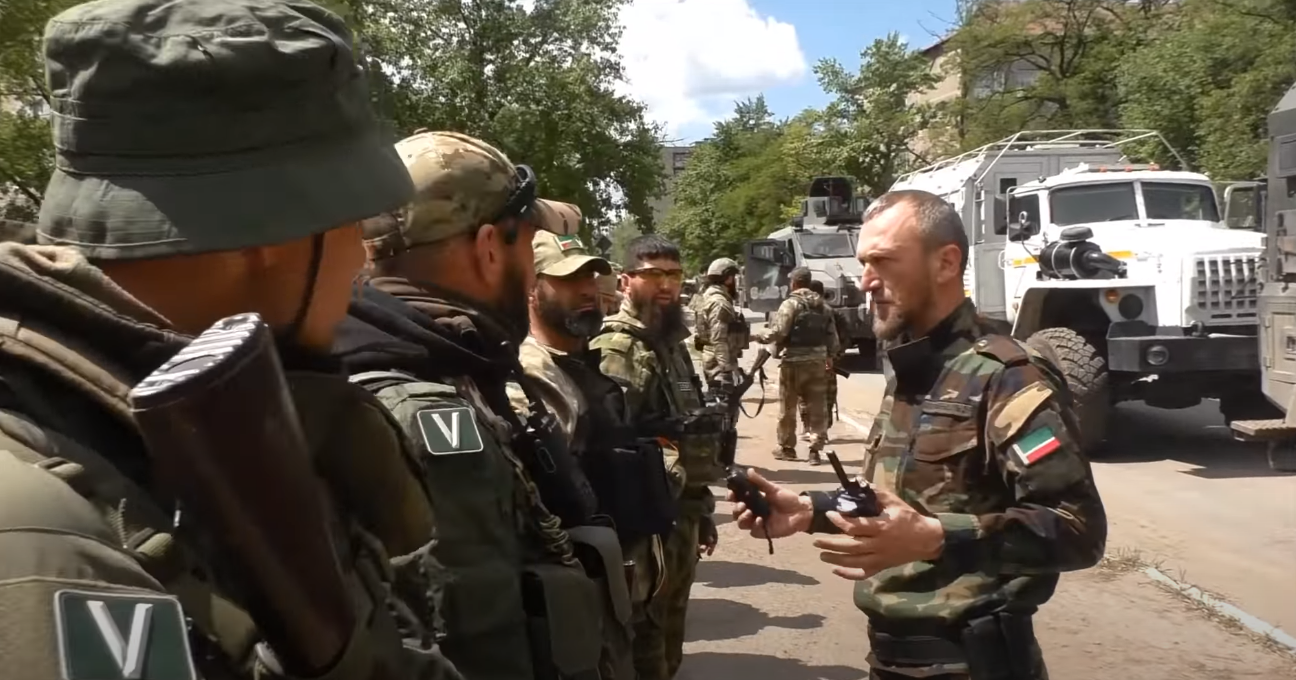
'Kadyrovite' Chechen troops during the 2022 battle of Donbas, June 2022

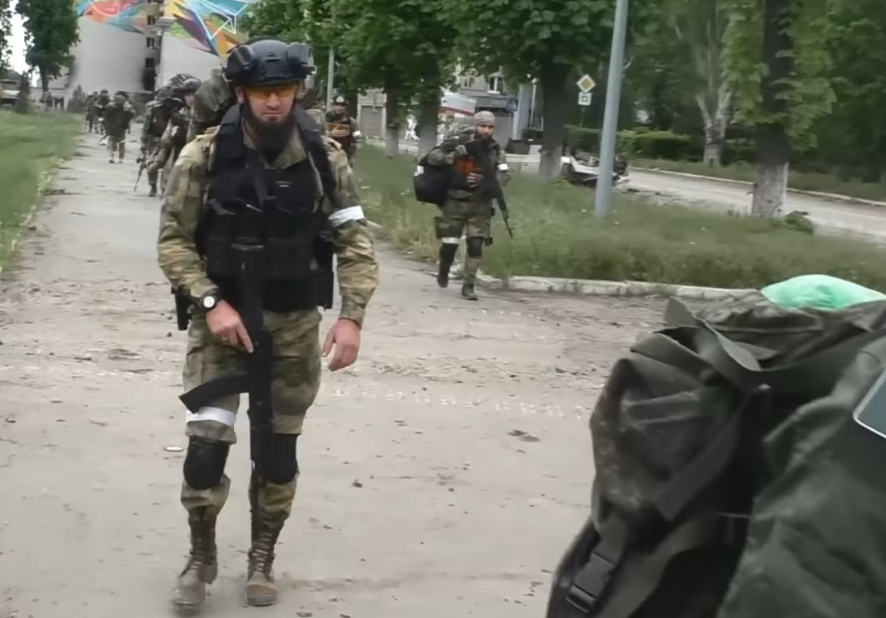
'Kadyrovite' Chechens in the Donbas, June 2022

Chechen militants loyal to Kadyrov have been active in the Russo-Ukrainian War since 2014. These forces include the Vostok Battalion and the Chechen Death Battalion.

Kadyrovite volunteer units participated in the 2022 Russian invasion of Ukraine, which began on 24 February. Ramzan Kadyrov confirmed on 26 February that the Kadyrovites had been deployed in Ukraine. According to Oleksiy Danilov, secretary of the National Security and Defense Council of Ukraine, they were deployed to capture and kill Ukraine's leaders, including Ukrainian president Volodymyr Zelenskyy. Foreign Policy described the deployment of Chechen Kadyrovites as "leveraging the very presence of Chechen soldiers in Ukraine as a psychological weapon against Ukrainians".

The Kyiv Independent reported the destruction of a Chechen column of 56 tanks by Ukrainian missiles near Hostomel on 27 February. According to Ukrainian sources, the missile attack had been delayed because the Kadyrovites had been hiding in civilian infrastructure. On the same day, the Ukrainian Ministry of Defence said that the Alpha Group of the SBU had ambushed a convoy of Chechen troops in Hostomel and killed the commander of the 141st motorized regiment Magomed Tushayev. Chechen leader Ramzan Kadyrov denied this, saying he was still alive and posted a video which he said showed Tushayev alive. Chechen media posted video it said was of Tushayev denying his death on 16 March 2022.

According to Ukrainian media, Chechen troops have been used as barrier troops, used to address low morale by executing Russian deserters. On 1 April, Ukrainian media reported that Chechen troops executed conscripted soldiers of the Luhansk People's Republic who refused to fight. There were unconfirmed reports that Chechen troops were executing Russian troops who were too injured in field hospitals. On 29 April, Ukrainian intelligence alleged that a unit of Buryat soldiers and Chechen troops exchanged fire on the village of Kyselivka in the Kherson Oblast. Supposedly the conflict was caused by the sharing of loot, exacerbated by tensions with what the Buryat soldiers saw as favoritism of the Chechen troops, as the Buryats had to be in the frontlines and conduct offensive operations while the Chechens are better-equipped and stay behind as barrier troops or conduct anti-partisan warfare.

On 1 March, Kadyrov said that Chechen fighters in Ukraine had sustained losses of two killed and six wounded. According to Ukrainian intelligence, the Chechen units suffered "hundreds" of casualties while being deployed around Kyiv and were withdrawn to Chechnya on 13 March 2022. Chechen troops were seen fighting in the Siege of Mariupol. The National Guard of Ukraine released a video appearing to show fighters from the Azov Regiment, based in Mariupol, greasing bullets in lard (salo) to be used against Chechen troops as an insult, in reference to the prohibition of pork in Islamic law.

Chechen troops in Ukraine have become known for publishing videos on social media, including combat footage from Mariupol. Kadyrov was widely mocked online as a "TikTok warrior" after a picture meant to show him traveling in Ukraine showed him praying at a gas station whose brand only exists in Russia.

In late June 2022, Ramzan Kadyrov announced the creation of four new battalions consisting only of ethnic Chechens. These battalions would be named Север-Ахмат ("North-Akhmat"), Юг-Ахмат ("South-Akhmat"), Запад-Ахмат ("West-Akhmat"), and Восток-Ахмат ("East-Akhmat"), according to Kadyrov, and that they would be sent to fight in Ukraine.

== Criticism ==
=== Human rights violations ===
A significant number of members of these groups are people with a criminal past, including people who committed criminal offences in the period between wars. Particularly feared are the PPSM-2, named after Akhmad Kadyrov, and the Oil Regiment. Officially, PPSM-2 is responsible for security on the streets and the Oil Regiment for the security of industrial sites. In reality, both structures are involved in so-called "anti-terrorist operations" involving grave human rights violations, according to human rights groups. Human rights activists working in Chechnya have accused the group of being heavily involved in kidnapping, torture and murder to cement Kadyrov's clan rule.

In October 2006, a German human rights group, the Society for Threatened Peoples (GfbV), that had branded Kadyrov a "war criminal", alleged that up to 75 percent of recent incidents of murder, torture, rape and kidnapping in Chechnya were committed by Ramzan's paramilitary forces.

The Memorial group investigator stated in its report: "Considering the evidence we have gathered, we have no doubt that most of the crimes which are being committed now in Chechnya are the work of Kadyrov's men. There is also no doubt in our minds that Kadyrov has personally taken part in beating and torturing people. What they are doing is pure lawlessness. To make matters worse, they also go after people who are innocent, whose names were given by someone being tortured to death. He and his henchmen spread fear and terror in Chechnya. (...) They travel by night as death squads, kidnapping civilians, who are then locked in a torture chamber, raped and murdered,".

Anna Politkovskaya, a veteran Russian reporter (murdered in 2006; case unsolved as of April 2008) who specialized in Chechen reporting, claimed that she had received a video footage of a man identical in appearance to Ramzan. "....On them (the clips) were the murders of federal servicemen by the Kadyrovites, and also kidnappings directed by Kadyrov. These are very serious things; on the basis of this evidence a criminal case and investigation should follow. This could allow this person to be brought to justice, something he has long richly deserved," she said. She was allegedly working on an article revealing human rights abuses and regular incidences of torture in Chechnya at the time of her murder. Some observers alleged that Kadyrov or his men were possibly behind the assassination.

The Kadyrovites are often accused of working as a death squad against Kadyrov's enemies. Ramzan is rumoured to own a private prison in his stronghold of Tsentoroi, his home village south-east of Grozny. Fields around Tsentoroi are reportedly mined and all access routes are blocked by checkpoints. On 2 May 2006, representatives of the Council of Europe's Committee for the Prevention of Torture (CPT) stated that they were prevented from entering the fortress. They have also begun using cell phones to record videos of them beating and humiliating ordinary Chechens accused of crimes. The videos are later circulated, with the intention of intimidating civilians.

According to the International Helsinki Federation for Human Rights's "Unofficial Places of Detention in the Chechen Republic" report, many illegal places of detention exist in the Chechen Republic. Most of them are run by Kadyrovites. In Tsentoroi (also known as Khosi-Yurt, present-day Akhmat-Yurt), where the Kadyrovite headquarters is located, there are at least two illegal prisons functioning. One consists of concrete bunkers or pillboxes, where kidnapped relatives of armed Chechen fighters are held hostages while the second prison in Tsentoroi is evidently located in the yard—or in immediate vicinity—of the house of Ramzan Kadyrov.

On 13 November 2006, Human Rights Watch published a briefing paper on torture in Chechnya that it had prepared for the 37th session of the United Nations Committee Against Torture. The paper covered torture by personnel of the Second Operational Investigative Bureau (ORB-2), torture by units under the effective command of Ramzan Kadyrov, torture in secret detentions, and the continuing "disappearances." According to HRW, torture "in both official and secret detention facilities is widespread and systematic in Chechnya." In many cases, the perpetrators were so confident that there would be no consequences for their abuses that they did not even attempt to conceal their identity. Based on extensive research, HRW concluded in 2005 that forced disappearances in Chechnya are so widespread and systematic that they constitute crimes against humanity.

On 1 March 2007, Lyudmila Alexeyeva, the head of the Moscow Helsinki Group rights organisation, stated "Kadyrov is to blame for kidnappings of many innocent people. Their bodies were found later with signs of torture."

In July 2022, videos surfaced on Russian Telegram channels showing the torture, castration, and subsequent execution of an unidentified Ukrainian prisoner of war at the Pryvillia Sanatorium in Pryvillia, Luhansk Oblast. Investigations by Bellingcat and the Conflict Intelligence Team identified the soldiers, including the main perpetrator, Ochur-Suge Mongush from Tuva, as members of the Akhmat Battalion, a paramilitary formation within the Kadyrovites, fighting alongside Russian forces. The footage drew widespread international condemnation as a war crime. In September 2022, the U.S. Treasury's Office of Foreign Assets Control and the U.S. Department of State simultaneously imposed sanctions and visa restrictions on Mongush.

=== Corruption ===
The Kadyrovites were accused of mass kidnappings (occasionally, even members of the Russian security forces have been kidnapped), tortures and summary executions, rapes, racketeering, participation in the illegal oil trade and other crimes even by Chechen and Russian officials. In October 2003, the former Chechen official and presidential candidate Shamil Burayev, accused the Security Service of "hunting for the dissidents". In May 2004, Russian Presidential adviser Aslambek Aslakhanov acknowledged that the "security guard of the Kadyrovs" was operating outside of the law.

In June 2005, Beslan Gantamirov, the former Chechen prime minister, accused the SB of "abductions and murder even of the FSB employees" and "gangsterism in the territory of all the North Caucasus". In April 2006, Mikhail Babich, another former prime minister of Chechnya and then Deputy Chairman of the Committee of the Russian State Duma on Defense, called the armed formations of Kadyrov "an absolutely illegal structure".

In May 2007, more than 100 members of the United Kingdom's political and cultural elite have appealed to President Vladimir Putin of Russia to restore "peace and justice" to Chechnya, calling Kadyrov's presidency "little more than a regime of fear and oppression".

In 2021 spetsnaz groups from different Russian regions, including the Kadyrovites, took part in a selection march at "Tambukan" training facility in Stavropol Krai. The event ended after the other participants accused the Chechen operators of cheating and covering some of the march distance in vehicles, resulting in a brawl.

=== Extrajudicial punishment ===
In 2006, a video leaked out in which armed men loyal to Ramzan Kadyrov displayed the severed head of a Chechen guerrilla who was killed in July 2006, separated from his body for public display in the village of Kurchaloi, marking the brutality of the Kadyrovites. They mounted the head on a pipe, together with blood-stained trousers, and put a cigarette on him. It was displayed for at least a day as they came back a day later to record it again.

According to human rights group Memorial as well as Anna Politkovskaya, the Deputy Prime Minister of Chechnya Idris Gaibov had orchestrated the atrocities by Kadyrovites in the outskirts of the Chechen village in the Kurchaloy on 27–28 July 2006. Reportedly, he hung the severed head of a killed rebel fighter up as a warning to the rest of the village. As a Chechen state official, he had given orders to members of the Russian security forces who were not subordinate to him to decapitate a dead body. Armed men then spent the next two hours photographing the head with their mobile phones. The head remained there for 24 hours.

On 21 September 2005, a similar incident occurred, as published by Memorial as well as Kavkazky Uzel which described "shocking details" of a special operation conducted by forces loyal to Ramzan Kadyrov, earlier in September in the town of Argun and the settlement of Tsotsin-Yurt. Citing local residents, the human rights group reported that on 14 September, a group of Kadyrovites placed a severed head on a pipe on a footbridge across the Khulkulau River for "general viewing" and intimidation purposes.

In 2005, unidentified men kidnapped separatist field commander Dokka Umarov's father Khamad, his wife, and one-year-old son. Several months earlier, his brother Ruslan Umarov, father of four children, had been kidnapped by masked men in uniform. His wife and son were later freed, but his father and brothers disappeared. According to some sources, Umarov's father, Khamad Umarov, was kidnapped back on 5 May 2008, by the Kadyrovite employees of the Oil Regiment (Neftepolk) headed by Chechnya's First Deputy Prime Minister Adam Delimkhanov.

In April 2007, Umarov declared that his 74-year-old father was murdered in captivity. His sister Natalia Khumaidova was also abducted in Urus-Martan in August 2005 by "unidentified armed men". She was released days later after local residents protested for her return. In the past years a cousin Zaurbek and nephew Roman Atayev were also kidnapped. Nothing has been heard of them since.

Shortly after the Beslan hostage-taking raid in 2004, Prosecutor General Vladimir Ustinov suggested the practice of taking rebel leaders' relatives hostage. Memorial, who largely condemned such practices, blamed pro-Russian Chechen forces for the abductions. According to separatists, all kidnapped persons were put into Ramzan Kadyrov's personal prison in Akhmat-Yurt.

== Equipment ==
Only equipment and vehicles for which photographic proof is available are included on this list.

=== Small arms ===
Chechnya's security forces
Model	Image	Origin	Cartridge	In service	Notes
Pistol
MP-443 Grach		Russia	9×19mm Parabellum	n/a	
Glock 17		Austria	9×19mm Parabellum	n/a	Used by Spetsnaz.
Pistol Caliber Carbine
CAA RONI		Israel	9×19mm Parabellum	n/a	Used by Spetsnaz.equipped with a Glock 17.
Assault rifles & Carbine
AK-74		Soviet Union	5.45×39mm	n/a	Standard Rifles.
AK-12		Russia	5.45×39mm	n/a	
AK-103		Russia	7.62×39mm	n/a	
AKS-74U		Soviet Union	5.45×39mm	n/a	
AR-15		United States	5.56×45mm NATO	n/a	Used by Spetsnaz.Limited use.
Machine guns
PKM		Soviet Union	7.62×54mmR	n/a	
PKP Pecheneg		Russia	7.62×54mmR	n/a	
Sniper rifles & designated marksman rifles
SVD		Soviet Union	7.62×54mmR	n/a	
Grenade launchers & Rocket propelled grenade launchers
RPG-7		Soviet Union	40mm	n/a	
RPG-26		Soviet Union	72.5mm	n/a	
GP-25		Soviet Union	40mm	n/a	

=== Vehicles ===
Chechnya's security forces
Model	Image	Origin	In service	Notes
Infantry fighting vehicles (IFVs)
BMP-1P		Soviet Union	n/a	
Armoured fighting vehicles (AFVs)
BRDM-2		Soviet Union	n/a	
Armoured personnel carriers (APCs)
BTR-70M		Soviet Union	n/a	
BTR-80		Soviet Union	n/a	
BTR-82A		Russia	n/a	
BTR-3		Ukraine	n/a	They were captured in Ukraine and taken to Chechnya.
SBA-60K2 Bulat		Russia	n/a	
Ural-432009 Ural-VV		Russia	n/a	
Z-STS Akhmat		Russia	n/a	They were named in honour of the former president of the Chechen Republic Akhmad Kadyrov.
Mine-resistant ambush protected (MRAP) vehicles		Russia		
K-53949 Typhoon-K		Russia	n/a	
K-4386 Typhoon-VDV		Russia	n/a	
KamAZ-63968 Typhoon		Russia	n/a	
KamAZ-435029 Patrol-A		Russia	n/a	
Buran		Russia	n/a	
KPE Arlan		Kazakhstan	n/a	
Infantry mobility vehicles (IMVs)
GAZ Tigr		Russia	n/a	
GAZ Tigr-M		Russia	n/a	
Iveco LMV Rys		Russia	n/a	
BPM-97		Russia	n/a	
Stallion II		Jordan	n/a	
ZFB-05		China	n/a	
SBA Varta		Ukraine	n/a	They were captured in Ukraine.
SBA Novator		Ukraine	n/a	They were captured in Ukraine.
KrAZ Cobra		Ukraine	n/a	They were captured in Ukraine.
M1151 HMMWV		United States	n/a	They were captured in Ukraine.
Light strike vehicles (LSVs)
Zibar Mk.2		Israel	n/a	
Chaborz M-3		Russia	n/a	
Chaborz M-6		Russia	n/a	
Armoured trucks
KamAZ-3958 «Gorets»		Russia	n/a	
KamAZ		Russia	n/a	They are protected with MM-501 armoured cabin.
Ural Federal		Russia	n/a	
(Armed) pick-up trucks
Toyota Land Cruiser		Japan	n/a	
UAZ Patriot		Russia	n/a	Some as pickup truck, some as 4x4 SUVs and others as armoured trucks.
Trucks
Ural-4320		Soviet Union	n/a	

== Notable incidents ==
=== Kadyrov-Alkhanov conflict ===
On 28 April 2006, security forces loyal to Ramzan Kadyrov fought a fist fight and then a gun battle with the bodyguards of then-pro-Russian president Alu Alkhanov. Up to two men were reportedly killed and four injured in the clash at the presidential administration complex, sparking fears of a broader power struggle between pro-Russian Chechen groups who controlled the republic. The exchange of fire happened during a meeting between Alkhanov and a federal official, Sergei Stepashin.

The Moskovskij Komsomolets newspaper reported that Alkhanov had banned Kadyrov from bringing more than two men of his private army with him into meetings. It reported that Kadyrov had rung Alkhanov and given him 30 minutes to flee the presidential administration as his men wanted to storm it. The official explanation of the whole incident was that "an ordinary quarrel" had occurred between two men who worked in the security services, and that no shots were ever fired.

The next day reports came out that Ramzan Kadyrov had officially disbanded his security service. On 4 June 2006, President Alu Alkhanov said he would prefer his republic be governed by Sharia law and suggested adapting the Islamic code, as it is championed by Kadyrov, He also dismissed reports of conflicts with Ramzan.

People in Chechnya long ago started talking about the Kadyrov-Alkhanov power struggle that included armed confrontation, murders, and hostage-taking. Many of these incidents are provoked by Kadyrov's men. In February 2005, for example, two of Alkhanov's men were killed and three civilians were injured during an attack in the Kurchaloev region of the republic, which was essentially in Kadyrov's personal domain. The ITAR-TASS attributed the killing to "members of one of the republic's security services currently involved in anti-terrorist operations".

In the other incident, members of an OMON unit based at the Grozny railway station exchanged fire with and then jailed a group of Kadyrovites. This incident outraged Kadyrov, who ordered his men to shoot to kill anyone who stood in their way. He reportedly called Alkhanov to warn him that there would be a "war" if his men were further provoked. Both sides called for reinforcements and there was further shooting before the situation was defused.

=== Murder of Abdul Halim Sadulayev ===
On 17 June 2006, a group of the Kadyrovites and FSB officers killed the president of Ichkeria, Abdul Halim Sadulayev (also known as Sheikh Abdul-Halim). His body was driven to Tsentoroy and presented to Ramzan Kadyrov. According to the FSB chief Nikolai Patrushev, two members of the federal forces were killed and five were wounded in a firefight in which Sadulayev and his bodyguard were killed, and two other rebels escaped. In August 2006, rebel commander Isa Muskiev said the FSB and Kadyrovites lost five men killed in the shootout, one of them shot by Sadulayev personally, and three fighters escaped.

The killing of Sheikh Abdul Halim was trumpeted by leaders of the Russian-backed official government of the province, claiming that the separatist forces there had been dealt a "decapitating blow from which they will never recover." The next day, 18 June, Sadulayev was succeeded as the head of the Chechen resistance by the rebel vice-president and an active guerrilla commander Dokka Umarov.

=== Goretz unit mutiny ===
The Goretz (Mountaineer) detachment of the Kadyrovites was a spetsnaz unit of the FSB headed by Movladi Baisarov, a close ally and chief bodyguard to Akhmad Kadyrov. It was formally disbanded and its servicemen were to be reassigned to the Chechen Interior Ministry. After Akhmad Kadyrov's death, conflict with Ramzan Kadyrov led to Baisarov being declared an outlaw, and many men in the detachment refused the reassignment. The Guardian in June 2006 detailed a showdown between Kadyrov's and Baisarov's forces that had taken place the previous month. The Kadyrovites ended up backing down in that confrontation when another Chechen warlord, Said-Magomed Kakiev, head of the Spetsnaz GRU unit the Special Battalion Zapad, came down on Baisarov's side.

Baisarov went to Moscow and appeared in the Russian media saying that Ramzan Kadyrov was trying to hunt him down to get rid of possible competition. He accused Kadyrov of directing numerous political murders and kidnappings. At the same time, he told Kommersant that he was not hiding from anyone in Moscow and was expecting to return to Chechnya soon to become the Deputy Prime Minister in charge of law enforcement. In October 2006, while Baisarov was in Moscow, it was believed he still commanded 50 to little over 100 men based in Grozny. On 18 November 2006, Baisarov was shot dead in central Moscow by a detachment of the Kadyrovites.

== See also ==
- Politics of Chechnya
- Chechen volunteers on the side of Ukraine
- Sulim Yamadayev–Ramzan Kadyrov power struggle
- Special Battalions Vostok and Zapad
- Arkan's Tigers
- Fakel (company)
- Redut (company)
- Shabiha, a similar militia loyal to the Assad family of Syria
- Basij, a similar militia in the Islamic Republic of Iran
- Caucasian Native Cavalry Division, Russian Empire
