= 18th Guards Motor Rifle Brigade =

- Russian: 18-я отдельная гвардейская Евпаторийская Краснознаменная мотострелковая бригада
- Great emblem of the 18th Guards Motor Rifle Brigade
- Active: 2008–2016
- Country: Russia
- Branch: Russian Ground Forces
- Type: Motorized Infantry
- Size: Brigade
- Part of: 58th Army
- Garrison/HQ: Khankala; MUN 27777
- Engagements: Annexation of Crimea by the Russian Federation; War in Donbas
- Decorations: Order of the Red Banner
- Honorifics: Yevpatoria

The 18th Guards Motor Rifle Brigade (Military Unit Number 27777) was a formation of the Russian Ground Forces. The brigade was formed in late 2008 from the 42nd Guards Motor Rifle Division and stationed in two bases near Grozny. The brigade was involved in the Russian military intervention in Ukraine and was combined with two other brigades to reform the 42nd Guards Motor Rifle Division in late 2016.

== History ==
The brigade was formed in late 2008 from the 42nd Guards Motor Rifle Division as part of the Russian military reform and was relocated to Khankala, near Grozny in Chechnya. In 2013, several units of the brigade were relocated to Kalinovskaya. It inherited the honorifics "Yevpatoria Red Banner" from the division. The brigade was part of the 58th Army in the Southern Military District and included the 1st Mechanized Battalion "Vostok". Sergey Kuzovlev previously commanded the brigade.

A battalion tactical group of the brigade was part of the troops in Crimea for the Russian military intervention in Ukraine during April 2014. The brigade's reconnaissance battalion contributed a reconnaissance team to the Russian military intervention in the war in Donbas from 14 July 2014. The brigade contributed a battalion tactical group from 11 August 2014. In February 2015 it was located in the Northern Operational Area. Between 1 and 2 February, a combined formation of the brigade and other Russian units were involved in combat near Debaltseve. After 13 February, the 20th Guards Motor Rifle Brigade's tactical group was reformed into a combined unit with the brigade. In late 2016, the brigade was merged with the 8th Guards Mountain Motor Rifle Brigade and 17th Guards Motor Rifle Brigade to reform the 42nd Guards Motor Rifle Division.
