= 270th Motor Rifle Regiment =

270th Motor Rifle Regiment "Akhmat-Kavkaz"
- 270-й мотострелковый полк "Ахмат-Кавказ"
- Active: 17 March 2025–present
- Country: Russia
- Branch: Russian Ground Forces
- Part of: 42nd Guards Motor Rifle Division
- Garrison/HQ: Grozny
- Engagements: Russian invasion of Ukraine

Commanders
- Current commander: Khusein Mezhidov

Insignia
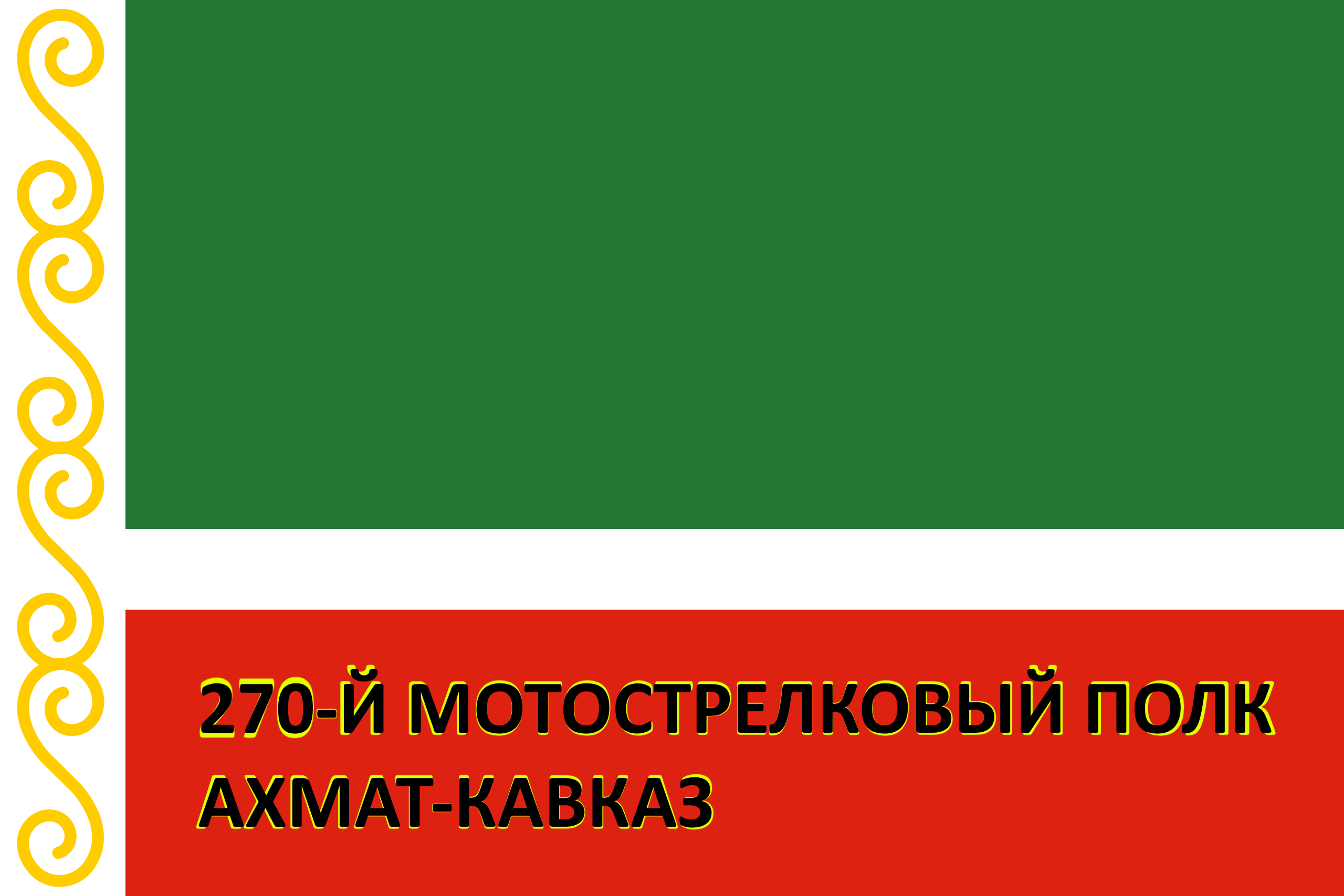
- Flag

The 270th Motor Rifle Regiment "Akhmat-Kavkaz" (Russian: 270-й мотострелковый полк "Ахмат-Кавказ"; Military Unit Number 93984) is a unit of the Russian Ground Forces established on 17 March 2025 in Grozny.

According to the Grozny-Inform state agency, the regiment’s logistical support is responsibility of the Akhmat Kadyrov Foundation.

== History ==
The 270th Motor Rifle Regiment was established on 17 March 2025 in Grozny, Chechnya as part of a larger effort to establish new military units from non-Russian majority areas.

In September 2025, the Regiment was spotted operating under the 42nd Guards Motor Rifle Division in the Orikhiv and Huliaipole directions, according to Ukrainian sources.

== Organisation and structure ==
The 270th Motor Rifle Regiment is part of the 42nd Guards Motor Rifle Division in the Russo-Ukrainian war, the fifth unit raised in the Chechen Republic to be deployed in the invasion of Ukraine.

Khusein Mezhidov is commander of the Regiment. Previously, Mezhidov served as commander of the Rosgvardia 249th Separate Special Motorized Battalion South.

Head of the Chechen Republic Ramzan Kadyrov stated that the Regiment will not be disbanded after the end of the war.
