= Varta (infantry mobility vehicle) =

Ukrainian armored vehicle

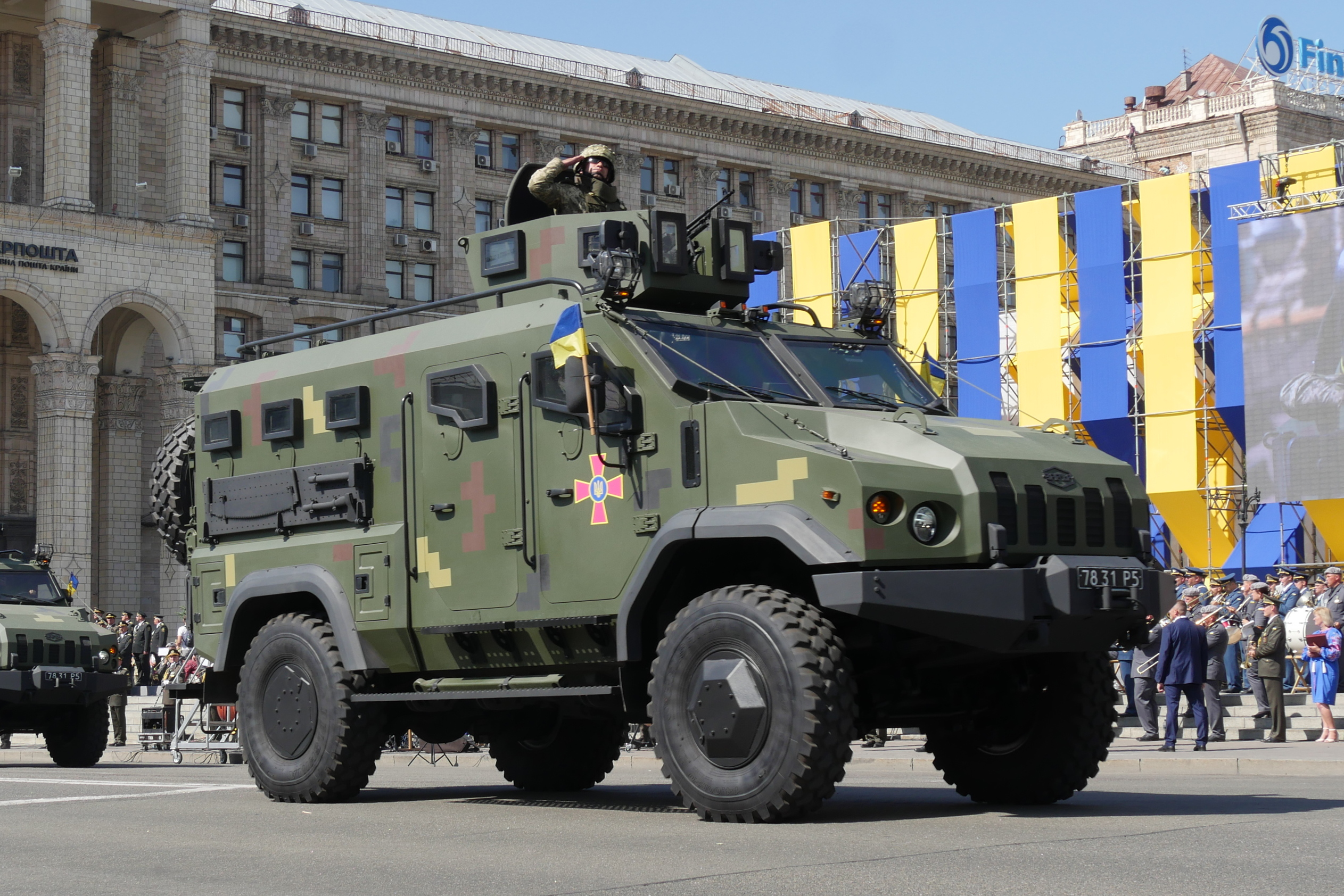
- Type: Infantry mobility vehicle
- Place of origin: Ukraine

Service history
- Used by: Ukrainian Armed Forces

Production history
- Designed: 2016
- Manufacturer: Ukrainian Armor
- Produced: 2015 - present
- No. built: 200+ (December 2019)

Specifications
- Mass: 17 500 kg
- Length: 6800 mm
- Width: 2550 mm
- Height: 2700 mm
- Crew: 10
- Armor: 560 Steel - Withstand Direct Fire from 7.62x39mm.
- Engine: 6-cylinder in-line turbo diesel, 380 hp., 1250 N*m, at 1200–1600 rpm.
- Transmission: 9 Gear Manual Transmission
- Suspension: 4x4
- Ground clearance: 330 mm
- Fuel capacity: 350 litres
- Operational range: Up to 600 km on road
- Maximum speed: Up to 120 km/h on road

The Varta (Ukrainian: Варта) is a infantry mobility vehicle designed by the Ukrainian Armor company of Ukraine.

Ukrainian Armor debuted the Varta APC in February 2019 at the International Defense Exhibition and Conference (IDEX) in Abu Dhabi with the most recent Novator rapid intervention vehicle. The Cabinet of Ministers of Ukraine granted Ukrainian Armor LLC the right to export products and import goods independently for the needs of production.

== Development ==
The production of the APC by "Ukrainian Armor," a privately owned company based in Kyiv, commenced with its debut demonstration model unveiled in Kyiv on December 7, 2015. This vehicle, produced specifically for the special operations units of both the National Guard of Ukraine and the Rapid Operational Response Unit, marked the company's inaugural product line.

== Operators ==
=== Current operators ===
- Ukraine:
  - Rapid Operational Response Unit — On May 6, 2016, special police units received the first VARTA armored vehicles for special police operations.
  - National Guard of Ukraine
    - Azov Assault Brigade — On June 18, 2017, the armored vehicle was presented as part of the Azov Regiment during the celebration of the 3rd anniversary of the Battle of Mariupol.
    - 4th Brigade of the Operational Assignment — have been used in the combat zone in eastern Ukraine since September 2017.
    - Kulchitskyi Battalion — On January 24, 2018, 4 vehicles were handed over.
  - Armed Forces of Ukraine — Since 2016, the specialized armored vehicle for the transportation of personnel "Varta" has been approved for operation in the Armed Forces of Ukraine for a special period under the name "Varta". On December 28, 2017, the Ministry of Defense received a batch of armored vehicles ahead of schedule.
    - On October 11, 2019, they were transferred to the artillery unit 28th separate mechanized brigade.
    - At the end of July 2020, units of the Special Operations Forces of the Armed Forces of Ukraine began to receive the Varta.
- Russia:

At least 24 were captured by Russian forces during the 2022 Russian invasion of Ukraine.

=== Potential operators ===
Morocco

- Royal Moroccan Army – Morocco was reportedly close to reaching an agreement with Ukraine on the procurement of a squadron of mine-resistant ambush-protected (MRAP) Varta vehicles from Ukrainian Armor, in favor of the Royal Moroccan Army. Morocco has purchased arms from Ukraine in the past, such as the RK-3 Corsar.

== Variants ==
- Varta – Base variant
- Smereka – 120mm mortar carrier, with capacity for 40 rounds
- Sokil – Configured as a mobile command post with the ability to launch drones
- Kamrat-L – Heavily armored NBC variant based on the chassis of the KrAZ-5233
- Varta-2 – Upgraded variant fitted with the 30mm "SICH" combat module

== Gallery ==
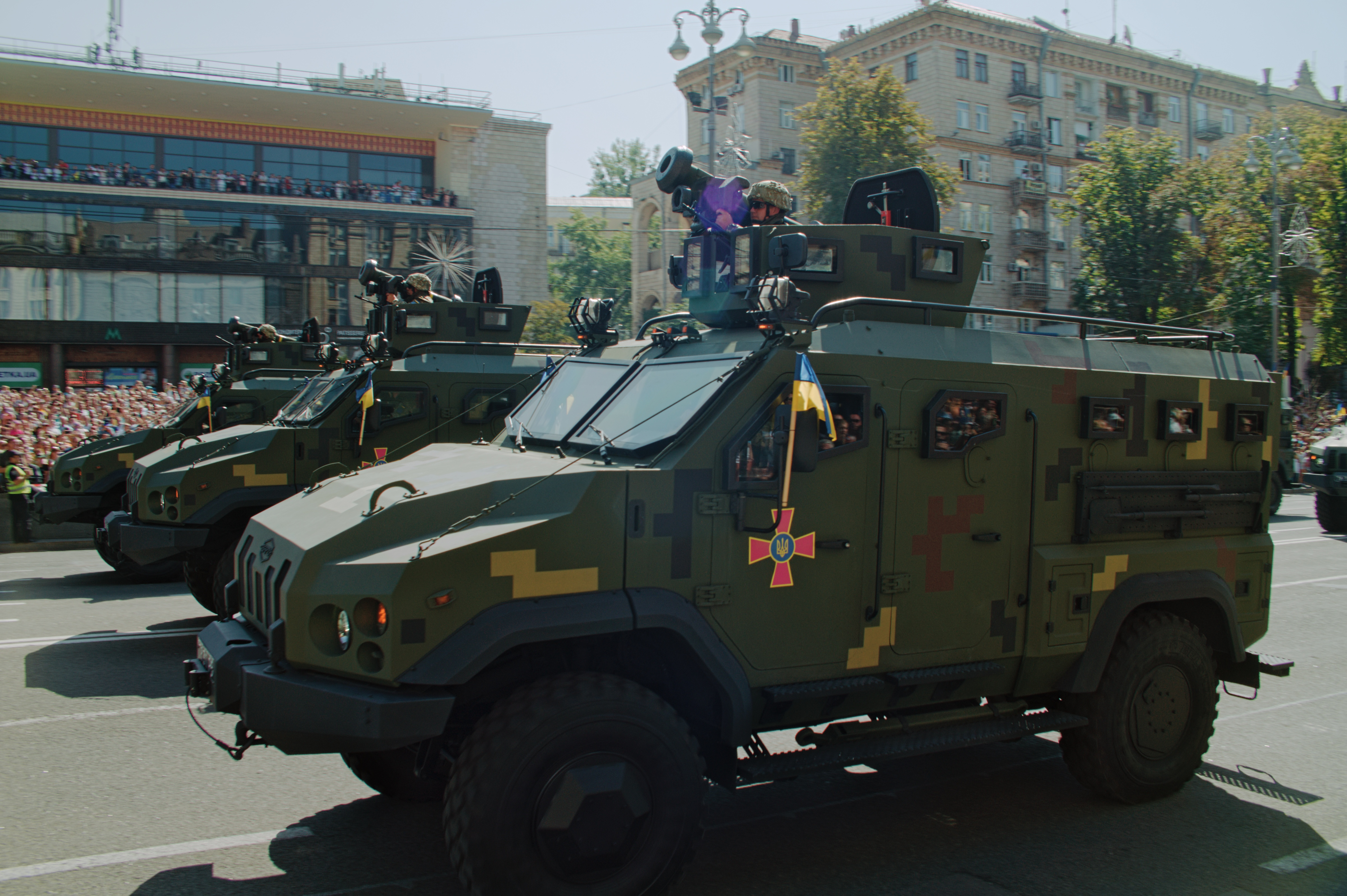

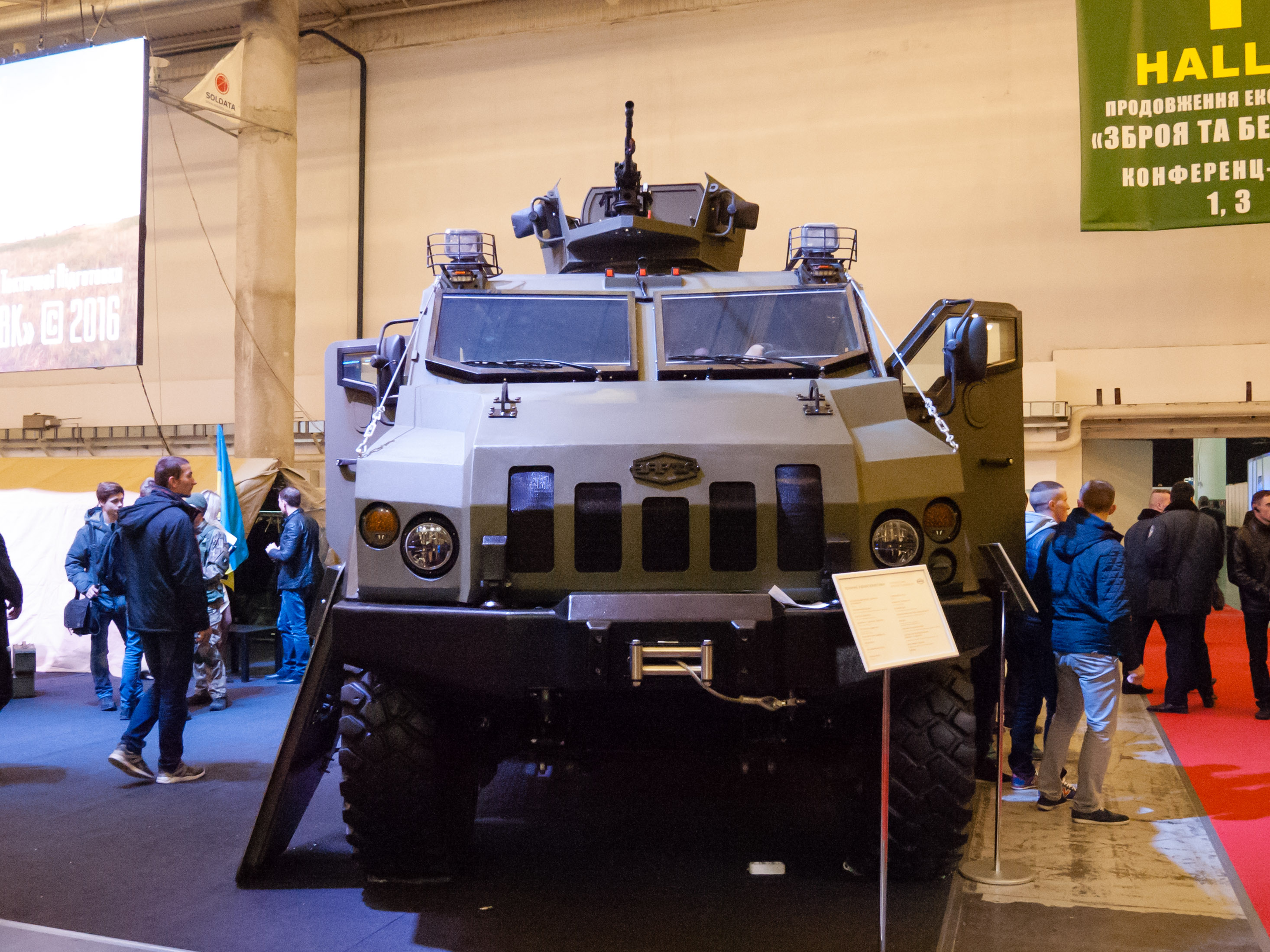

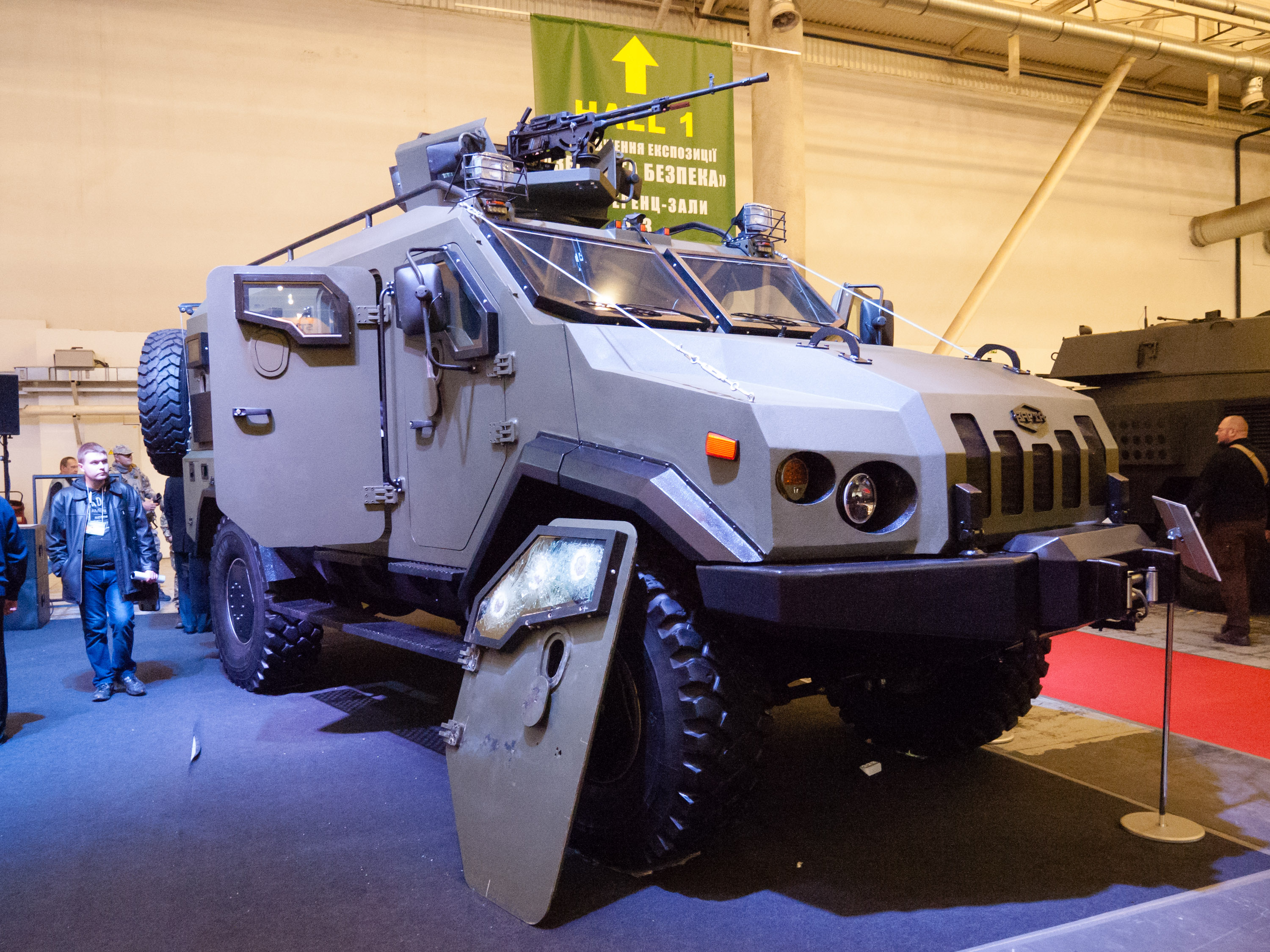

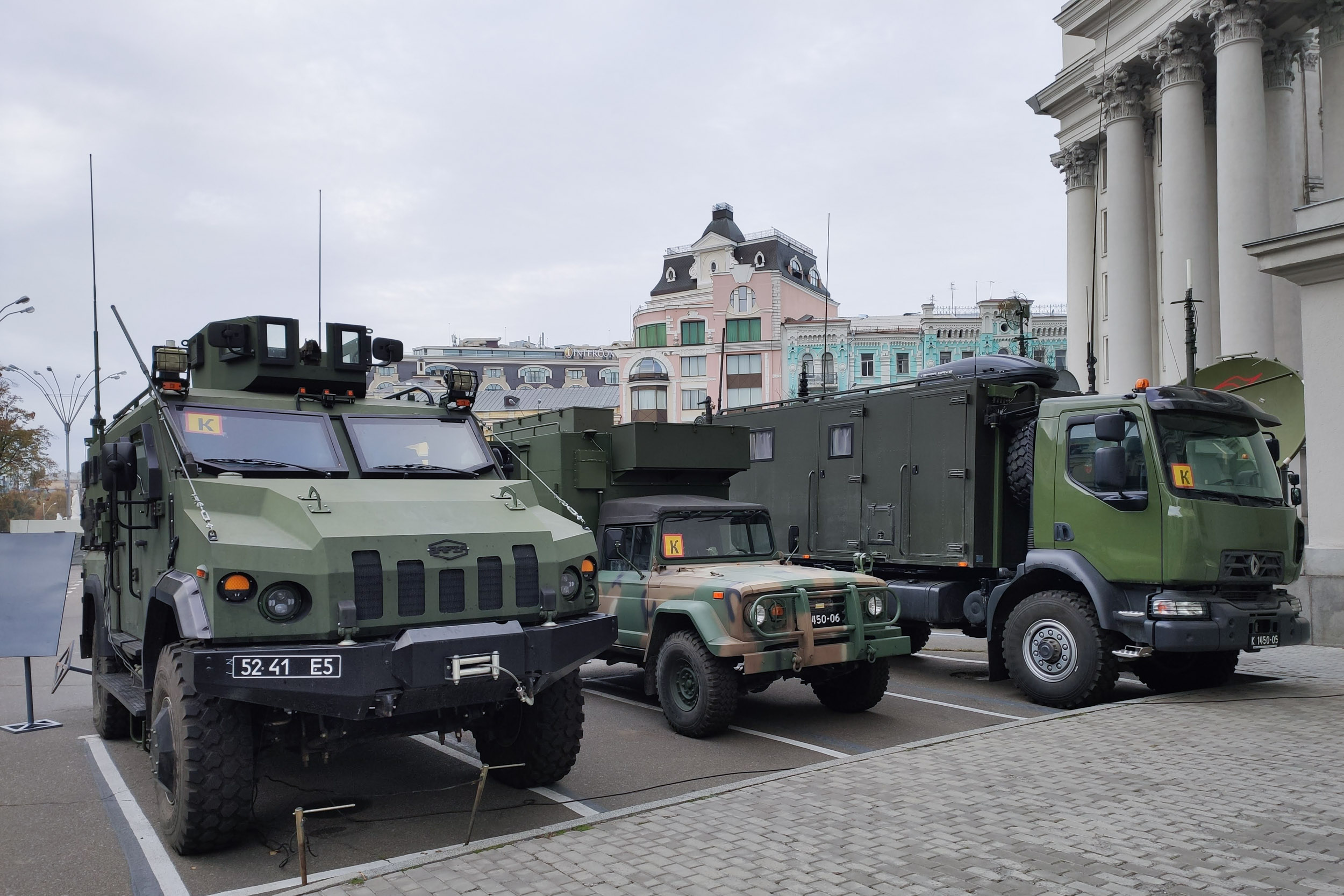
K-1450 command vehicles and Varta, Kyiv 2021

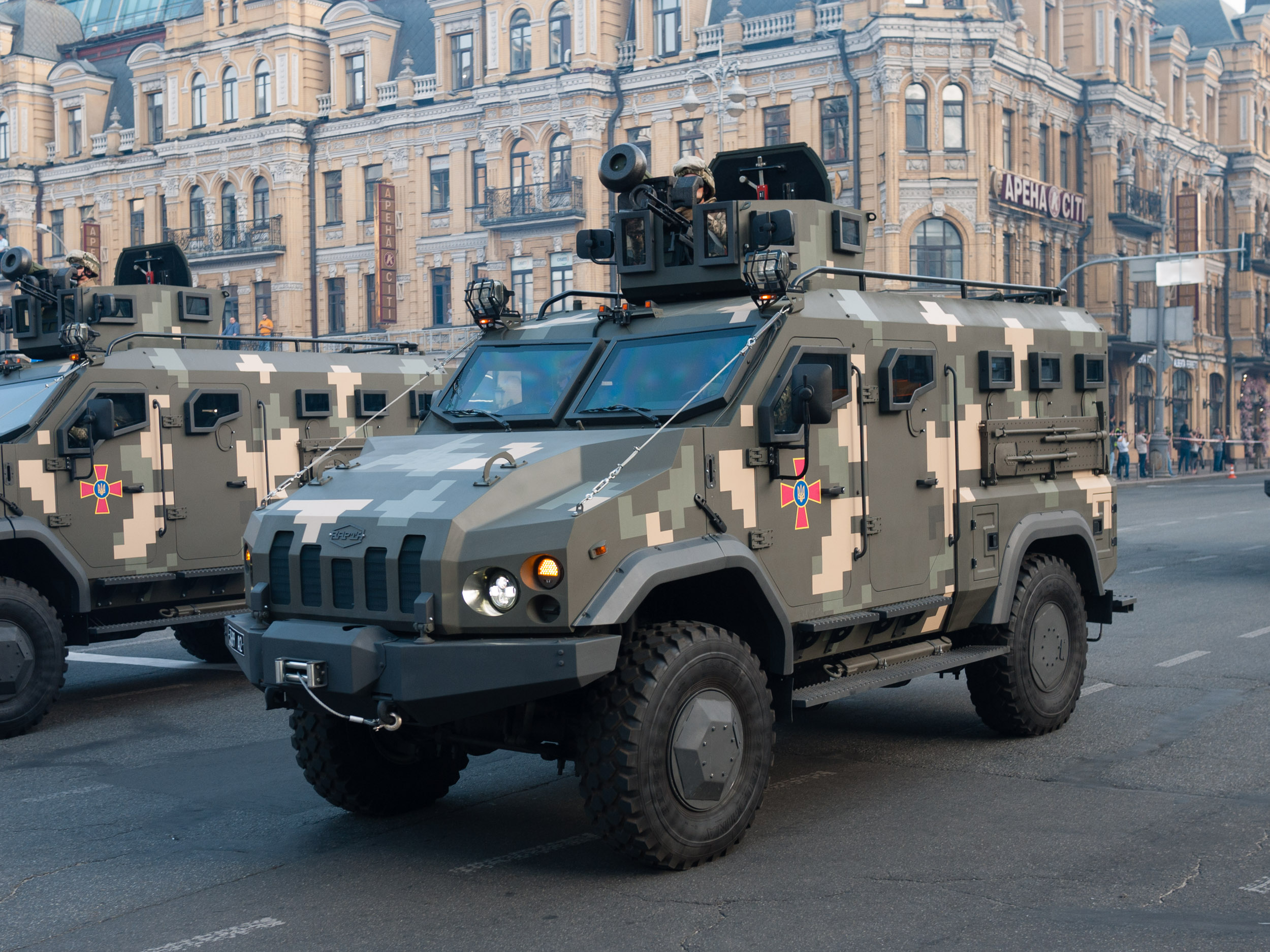

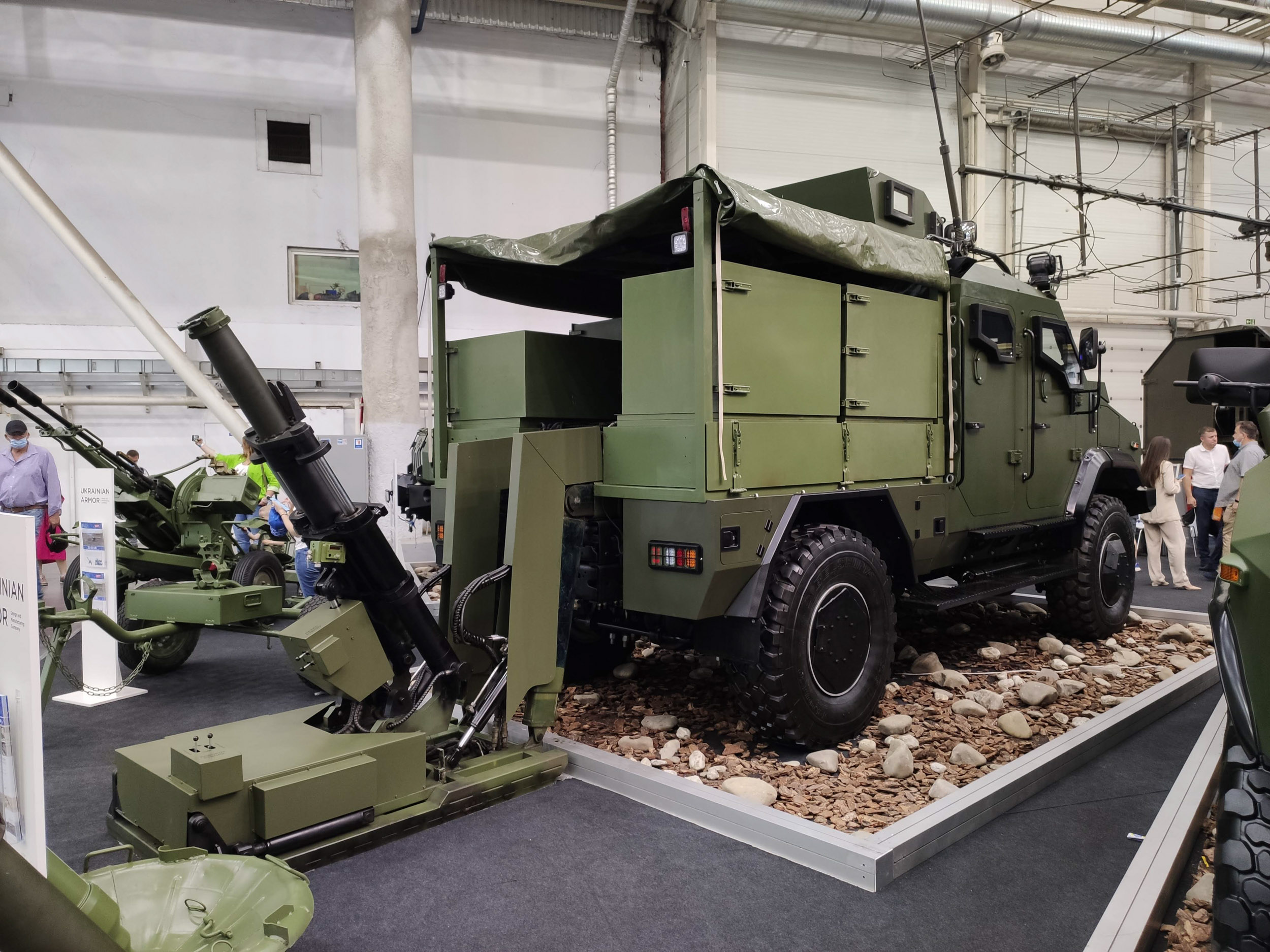

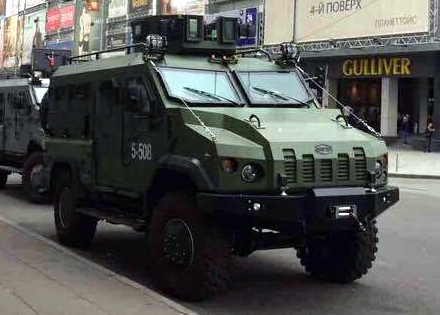
