= Idris Gaibov =

Chechen politician and military commander

Idris Gaibov is the Deputy Prime Minister of Chechnya in the government of Ramzan Kadyrov as of 2006. He is a former field commander of the Chechen Republic of Ichkeria.

From 1997 to 1999 (during the regime of Aslan Maskhadov), Gaibov was the head of Kurchaloyevsky District. His brothers Rizvan and Ibragim were reported to be detained by Russians during a "cleansing operation" in 2001.

According to human rights group Memorial as well as Anna Politkovskaya, Gaibov had orchestrated the atrocities by Kadyrov units in the outskirts of the Chechen village in the Kurchaloy on July 27–28, 2006. Reportedly, he hung the severed head of a killed rebel fighter up as a warning to the rest of the village. As a Chechen state official he had given orders to members of the Russian security forces who were not subordinate to him to decapitate a dead body. Armed men then spent the next two hours photographing the head with their mobile phones; the head remained there for 24 hours.
