= Ukrainian Armor =

Defence company

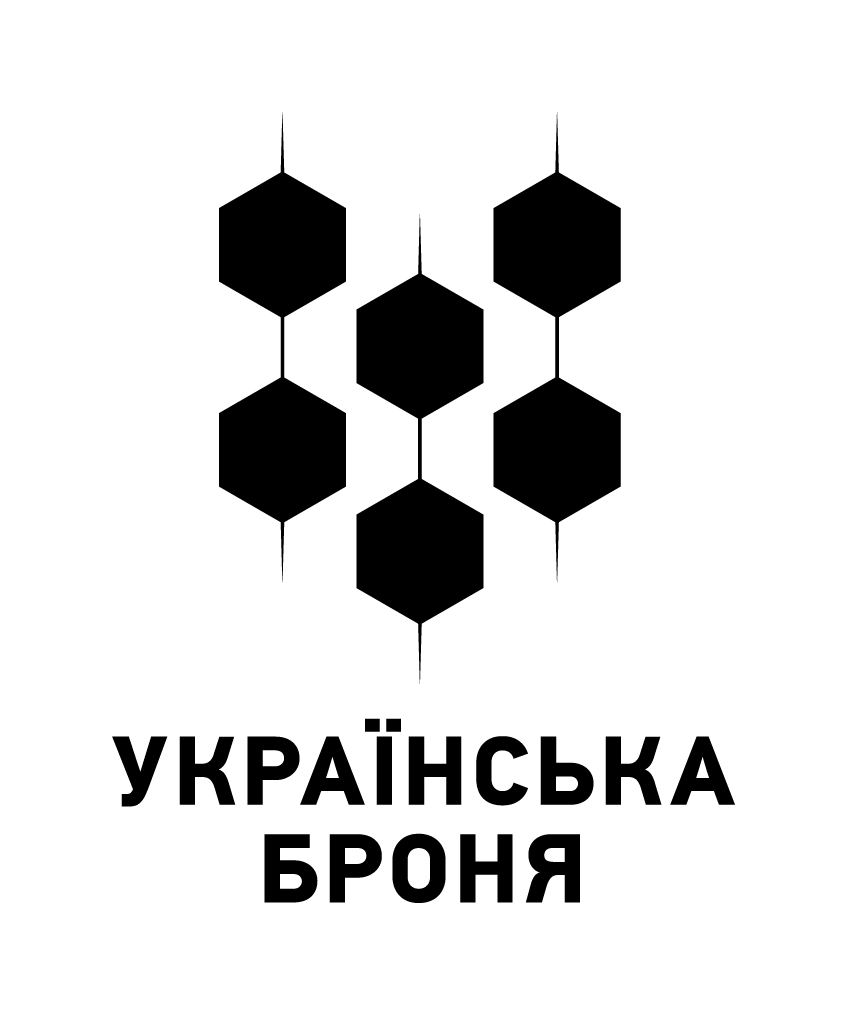
- Logo of Ukrainian Armor
- Type: Limited liability company
- Industry: production of personal protection equipment
- Founded: 2014
- Headquarters: Povitroflotskyi Ave. 94A, Kyiv, Ukraine
- Products: bulletproof vests, helmets, ammunition, soft ballistic protection, bulletproof plates
- Website: https://ukrainianarmor.com/

Ukrainian Armor (Ukrainian: Українська Броня [ʊkrɐˈjinʲsʲkɐ broˈnʲɑ]) is an defence company located in Kyiv, Ukraine. The company produces bulletproof vests, armored vehicles, mortar systems, and unmanned ground systems, among other products.

The company was founded in 2014 by volunteers following the events of Euromaidan and the start of the War in the Donbas, and has grown into one of Ukraine's largest private arms manufacturers. It also has previously provided its products to the international market, especially in the United States under the name "UArm". Following the Russian invasion of Ukraine, the company has expanded its production more than 100-fold and was claimed to be one of Ukraine's top three military manufacturers by production volume.

== History ==
Ukrainian Armor was built on 19 February 2014 during Ukraine's Revolution of Dignity. The founders realized that Euromaidan self-defence forces catastrophically lacked bulletproof vests. Ukraine Armor begun as a start-up founded by 25 friends, including engineers. Initially, the team worked out of a kitchen creating improvised equipment. During the confrontation in Eastern Ukraine, the demand for ammunition grew and construction workers, engineers and designers joined the company. The team began to investigate foreign expertise. Their customers included the Azov Battalion, security enterprises, and businessmen.

In 2015, production capacities expanded to the operating department of Aircraft Development Plant No 20. Production of bulletproof helmets was set up. During this time, they also entered the international market through the United States under the name "UArm", a practice they continued to do until the invasion in 2022, where export was impractical. At the time, they attracted more customers internationally in comparison to domestically in Ukraine.

Following the Russian invasion of Ukraine, the company started focusing on supplying exclusively to Ukrainian Armed Forces at a reduced price. The company's then-director, Vyacheslav Nalyvaiko, also quit to join the army but was killed on 3 September 2022 during the 2022 Kherson counteroffensive. Following the invasion, the production of the company grew by more than 100-fold, as previously they were only producing a maximum of around 100 bulletproof vests per month. Since the start of the war, the company has grown into one of Ukraine's top-three military manufacturers by production volume. However, as a result, their factories have also been the frequent target of strikes by the Russian Armed Forces, which has led the company to distribute production instead of central locations.

At the end of 2023, the Ministry of Defence of Ukraine approved the first bulletproof vest for female servicewomen - a female anatomical bulletproof vest developed by Ukrainian Armour. The product was designed in collaboration with medics from Hospitallers Medical Battalion. The company also later developed the armor suit "Bureviy", which was certified by the ministry in 2024, which claimed to provide double the protective area in comparison to a standard plate barrier. In 2024, Ukrainian Armor announced it was in negotiations to create one of the world's largest armor manufacturing plants to produce the majority of its components and expand its clientele into Central Europe. However, the company's director said that they would not receive any state financial support, and that it was only requesting long-term contracts in order to support the production of the plant.

== Products ==
Ukrainian Armor currently produces:

- Military bulletproof vests of NIJ IIA, II, IIIA, III, IV protection levels.
- Bulletproof vests of concealable and semi-concealable types of NIJ IIA, II, IIIA protection levels.
- Bulletproof helmets of NIJ IIIA protection level, V50 720 m/s.
- Bulletproof ceramic plates, light pressed made of UHMWPE and aramid, tempered steel and titan.
- Soft ballistic fragments protection of 1of NIJ IIA, II, IIIA protection levels.
- Bulletproof vests for hunters.
- Bulletproof vests for military officers and police officers.
- Tactical ammunition: load bearing equipment, web gears, magazine carriers.
- Bulletproof vests for hunting and police dogs.
