= 42nd Guards Motor Rifle Division =

Russian Ground Forces formation

42nd Guards Motor Rifle Division (2016–present) 18th Guards Motor Rifle Brigade (2008–2016) 173rd Guards District Training Centre (1987–1992) 42nd Guards Training Motor Rifle Division (1960–1987) 42nd Guards Motor Rifle Division (1957–1960) 24th Guards Rifle Division (1942–1957) 111th Rifle Division (1940–1942)
- Russian: 42-я гвардейская мотострелковая дивизия
- Shoulder sleeve patch
- Active: 1940—2009; 2016—present
- Country: Russia
- Branch: Russian Ground Forces
- Type: Mechanized infantry
- Size: Division
- Part of: 58th Combined Arms Army
- Garrison/HQ: Khankala, Chechnya
- Anniversaries: July 16, 1940
- Engagements: World War II; Second Chechen War; Russo-Ukrainian War; 2023 Ukrainian counteroffensive
- Decorations: Order of the Red Banner
- Battle honours: Yevpatoria

Commanders
- Current commander: Colonel Roman Demurchiyev

The 42nd Guards Evpatoriyskaya Red Banner Motor Rifle Division (Military Unit Number 29410 until September 1987; MUN 28320 thereafter) is a Russian military unit.

The division was formed as the 111th Rifle Division in Vologda in 1940, and became the 24th Guards Rifle Division in March 1942. It was based in the North Caucasus following World War II and became 42nd Guards MRD on 10 June 1957, while at Grozny. It became 42nd Guards Training Motor Rifle Division, part of the 12th Army Corps, on 18 October 1960.

== Second World War ==
The division was formed in July 1940 in Vologda as the 111th Rifle Division based on the 29th Reserve Brigade of the Arkhangelsk Military District.

On 16 July 1940, the division was fully formed, which became the division's anniversary date. Until March 1941, the 111th Rifle Division held 3,000 personnel. According to the "Reference on the deployment of the Armed Forces of the USSR in the event of a war in the West", prepared by N.F. Vatutin on 13 May 1941, the 111th Rifle Division was supposed to join the 28th Army. From 10 to 20 June 1941, the 111th Rifle Division was strengthened with 6,000 assigned personnel. The peacetime shtat (table of organization and equipment) No. 4/120 in the spring of 1941 was 5,900 personnel.

On the day the German Operation Barbarossa began, 22 June 1941, the division was in field camps at the Kushchuba training center, 50 km from Vologda. From 24 to 30 June 1941, the 111th Rifle Division was included in the 41st Rifle Corps of the Moscow Military District. The division was redeployed through Yaroslavl and Leningrad and departed for the Northwestern Front. On 30 June 1941, the corps arrived in the region of the city of Ostrov, Pskov Oblast, to engage in defense in the Ostrov and Pskov fortified areas. Under enemy fire, elements of the division unloaded at the Pskov, Cherskaya, and Ostrov stations and moved directly from the railway into battle.

22 June 1941 Divisional Order of Battle
On 22 June 1941, the order of battle of the division was as follows:
- 111th Rifle Division, in Vologda, Vologda Oblast
    - 223rd Signal Battalion
    - 146th Reconnaissance Battalion (1st Coy: 9 x FAI armoured cars, 2nd Coy: 5 x T-38 light tanks, 3rd Coy: 9 x Trucks)
    - 399th Rifle Regiment (3 x battalions)
    - 468th Rifle Regiment (3 x battalions)
    - 532nd Rifle Regiment (3 x battalions)
    - 286th Light Artillery Regiment (8 x 76mm M1936 (F-22) division light field guns and 4 x 152mm M1938 (M-10) howitzers)
    - 561st Howitzer Regiment (12 x 122mm M1938 (M-30) howitzers and 6 x 152mm M1937 (ML-20) howitzer guns)
    - 267th Anti-Tank Battalion (12 x 45mm M1932 (19-K) anti-tank guns)
    - 466th Anti-Aircraft Battalion (8 x 37mm M1939 (61-K) automatic light anti-aircraft guns and 4 x 76mm M1938 air defense guns)
    - 181st Engineer Battalion
    - 189th Supply Battalion
    - 120th Medical Battalion
    - 119th Chemical Defence Company

The division became the 24th Guards Rifle Division in March 1942. It was based in the North Caucasus following World War II; it became 42nd Guards MRD on 10 June 1957, while at Grozny. It became 42nd Guards Training Motor Rifle Division, part of the 12th Army Corps, on 18 October 1960.

== Training centre 1987–1992 ==
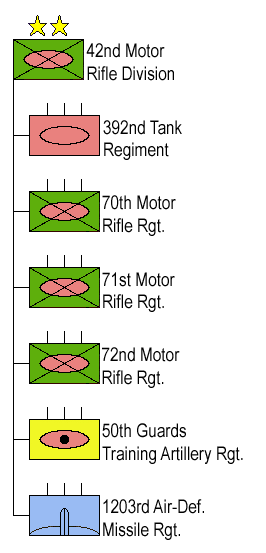
1986 Structure of the 42nd Motor Rifle Division

On 14 September 1987, it became the 173rd Guards District Training Centre. In 1991, it comprised the 70th, 71st, and 72nd Motor Rifle Regiments; the 392nd Tank Regiment at Shali; the 50th Guards Training Artillery Regiment; and the 1203rd Anti-aircraft Rocket Regiment. In November 1990, it had 219 tanks, 187 being T-55s.

From September to December 1991, part of the Training Centre's equipment and weapons were withdrawn from Chechnya by rail. In 1992, the Training Centre was disbanded. By Directive of the General Staff of the Armed Forces No. 314/3/0159 dated 4 January 1992, the 173rd Guards District Training Centre was to be disestablished, and weapons and military equipment removed. A cipher telegram from General of the Army P. S. Grachev, dated 20 May 1992, allowed the commander of the North Caucasus Military District to transfer 50 percent of the military equipment and weapons to the Chechen Republic of Ichkeria.

In early January 1992, Major General Pyotr Sokolov, the commander of the Training Centre (ru:Соколов,_Пётр_Алексеевич_(генерал)), issued an order to issue personal weapons to officers and ensigns to protect them and other Soviet personnel from Chechen attacks.

Through robbery and extortion, much of the Training Centre and other military units' armament and military equipment passed into the hands of Chechen separatists. Approximately 400,000 small arms fell into separatist hands. The separatists also obtained 42 tanks, 34 infantry fighting vehicles, 14 armored personnel carriers, 139 artillery systems, 101 anti-tank weapons, 27 anti-aircraft guns and installations, two helicopters, 27 wagons of ammunition, 3,050 tons of fuel and lubricants, 38 tons of clothing, and 254 tons of food. When the division was disbanded in April 1992, 44 MT-LBs, 57,000 small arms, and 27 wagons of ammunition were transferred to the Chechen Republic.

== Reformed ==
Following the beginning of the Second Chechen War, the division was designated in December 1999 as the permanent garrison force for Chechnya, and various military districts started raising their regiments separately in 2000. The division was intended to have a strength of 15,500 men. Its headquarters was established at Khankala outside Groznyy, with the 71st Motor Rifle Regiment also at the same base; the 71st MRR was raised in the Volga Military District. The 70th Motor Rifle Regiment was formed in the Urals MD and located at Shali. The 72nd MRR, raised from the 2nd Guards Tamanskaya Motor Rifle Division in the Moscow Military District, was established at Kalinovskaya. The 291st Motor Rifle Regiment, originating in the Leningrad Military District, was set up at Borzoy.

On 1 July 2000, Deputy Defence Minister Colonel-General Aleksandr Kosovan said that the MOD had decided on the area of the Borzoy settlement instead of the planned Itum-Kale for the 42nd Division’s motor rifle regiment. He also said that three of the regiments of the 42nd Division were going to be equipped "to the maximum" by the end of the year. The writer Michael Orr noted that the 291st Motor Rifle Regiment had been relocated 'when the tactical vulnerability of the position [originally Itum-Kale] was appreciated.' The division was equipped with T-62 tanks, with at least one regiment having BMP-1 IFVs (infantry fighting vehicles).

The 42nd Division included two Chechen battalions, Vostok-Akhmat and Zapad-Akhmat, volunteer formations raised by Ramzan Kadyrov in late June 2022. They were named after older Chechen Spetnz units from the Chechen wars, although the new units' only relation to the older units was their name.

The division was reestablished in 2016, based on the 18th Guards Motor Rifle Brigade and additional units. In November 2021, units of the division were deployed to Crimea. The division took part in the Russian invasion of Ukraine with three of its Motor Rifle Regiments (70th, 71st, and 291st). The 70th Motorized Rifle Regiment suffered substantial losses in southeastern Ukraine. As of July 2023, Colonel Roman Demurchiyev was division commander.

During the 2023 Ukrainian counteroffensive, the division was heavily engaged around Robotyne.

In 2025, the Division received the Chechnya-based 270th Motor Rifle Regiment "Akhmat-Kavkaz".
