= BPM-97 =

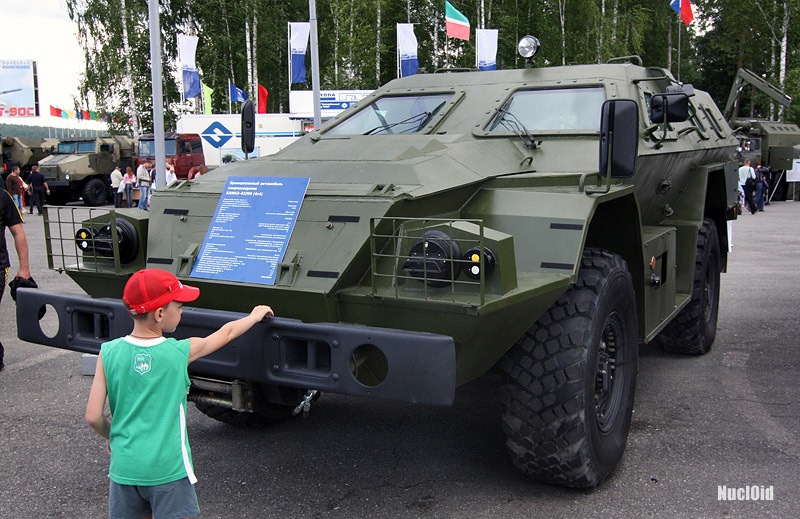
- KAMAZ-43269 "Vystrel" (BPM-97) on Russian Expo Arms 2009 in Nizhny Tagil
- Type: Armored personnel carrier, MRAP
- Place of origin: Russia

Service history
- In service: 1999–present
- Used by: See Operators
- Wars: Russo-Ukrainian War; Syrian Civil War

Production history
- Designer: Andrei Nikolaev
- Designed: 1997
- Manufacturer: KAMAZ
- Produced: 1999–present
- No. built: 150±
- Variants: See Variants

Specifications
- Mass: 10.5 metric tonnes
- Length: 5.3 m
- Width: 1.9 m
- Height: 2.3 m (1.83 m without armament)
- Crew: 2 + 8 – 12 passengers 2 + 6 passengers (BTR-40B)
- Armor: 12.7–25 mm
- Main armament: 14.5mm KPVT machine gun (optional); 12.7mm Kord machine gun (optional)
- Secondary armament: 30mm AGS-17 grenade launcher (optional)
- Engine: KAMAZ 740.10-20 V8 diesel 240 hp
- Suspension: 4×4 wheel, leaf spring
- Ground clearance: 400 mm
- Fuel capacity: 270 L
- Operational range: 1100 km on roads
- Maximum speed: 90 km/h

The BPM-97 (Boyevaya Pogranichnaya Mashina - "Battle Vehicle of the Border Guard") or Выстрел (en. Gunshot) is the Russian military designation for the KAMAZ 43269 Vystrel 4×4 wheeled mine-resistant, ambush protected (MRAP) vehicle. It is produced fitted with several different turrets like the BTR-80A. The vehicle is based on the KAMAZ-43269 and was designed for the Russian Border Guards. The latest model has bulletproof side windows and no gun turret. It has been ordered by Kazakhstan, in addition to domestic orders from the National Guard of Russia, the Federal Prison Service and EMERCOM.

== History ==
Development began in 1997. The new armored vehicle was meant to replace the border guards' main transport, the GAZ-66. After a government funding default in 1998, the much delayed public funding of the project was stopped. In order to offset the cost of the development in the absence of government orders, machines were allowed to be sold to civilian companies.

The armored vehicle was used for the transportation of explosives, money and valuable goods. After receiving permission in 2005, some cars were sold to the Ministry of Internal Affairs of Kazakhstan and Azerbaijan. Production of the "Vystrel" is ongoing at the JSC "Remdizel" plant in Naberezhnye Chelny, where the armoured body and KAMAZ 4326 truck chassis are integrated.

The armored car "Shot" entered service with the Russian Defense Ministry in 2009. Antiterrorist units of all divisions of the Strategic Missile Forces are equipped with "KAMAZ-43269" armored vehicles as of 2013.

In 2015 several BPM-97 were used in War in Donbas where at least 3 of them were destroyed in February 2015.

The BPM-97 has seen service during the Russian invasion of Ukraine. As of 2024, two have been destroyed and three captured.

== Description ==
The hull is made of welded steel. The upper part of the vehicle's armored body withstands hits from a 12.7×108mm - NSV machine gun at a distance of 300 metres. The lower part protects against 7.62×54mmR SVD rifles at a distance of 30 m.

The vehicle is divided into the engine compartment and separate crew areas. The body has side and rear doors, and roof hatches for exiting.

The base vehicle is the KAMAZ 4326 4×4 truck.

== Armament ==
Armament varies. The BPM-97 is available with a pintle mounted or turret mounted 7.62 mm, 12.7 mm machine guns such as the Kord 12.7mm, 14.5 mm KPV heavy machine guns as in a BTR-80 type turret, or a BPPU turret mounting a 30 mm 2A42 autocannon and 7.62 mm PKTM coaxial machine gun. More recently, some BPM-97s have been seen mounted with the new BM-30-D Spitsa (Spoke) turret. This new turret now includes a 30 mm AG-30 automatic grenade launcher in addition to the 2A42 autocannon and coax PKTM.

== Variants ==
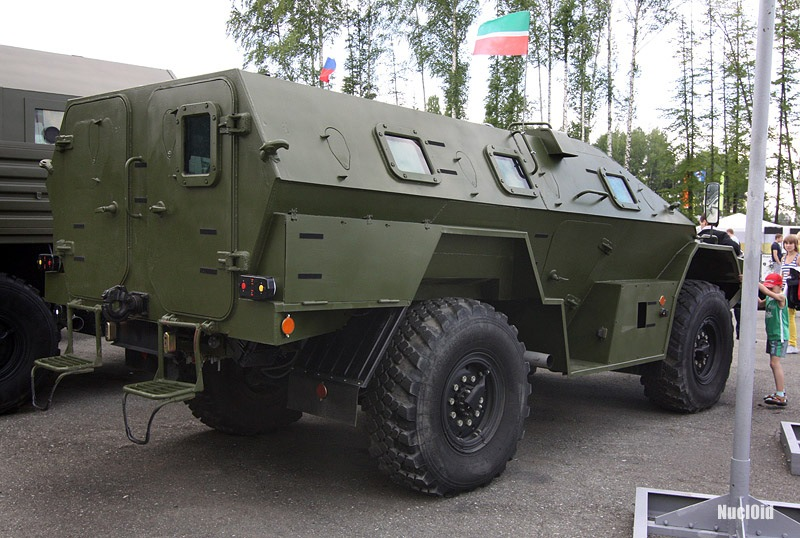
A BPМ-97 at the Russian Expo Arms 2009 in Nizhny Tagil

- BPM-97 – Modification for the border troops.
- KAMAZ-43269 "Dozor" – BRM modification for the Army.
- KAMAZ-43269 "Vystrel" (The Shot) – upgraded with a modified armored windshield wipers, transferred air intake and an air purification system, introduced during the 2011 exhibition of military vehicles at the Bronnitsy test range.

== Versions ==
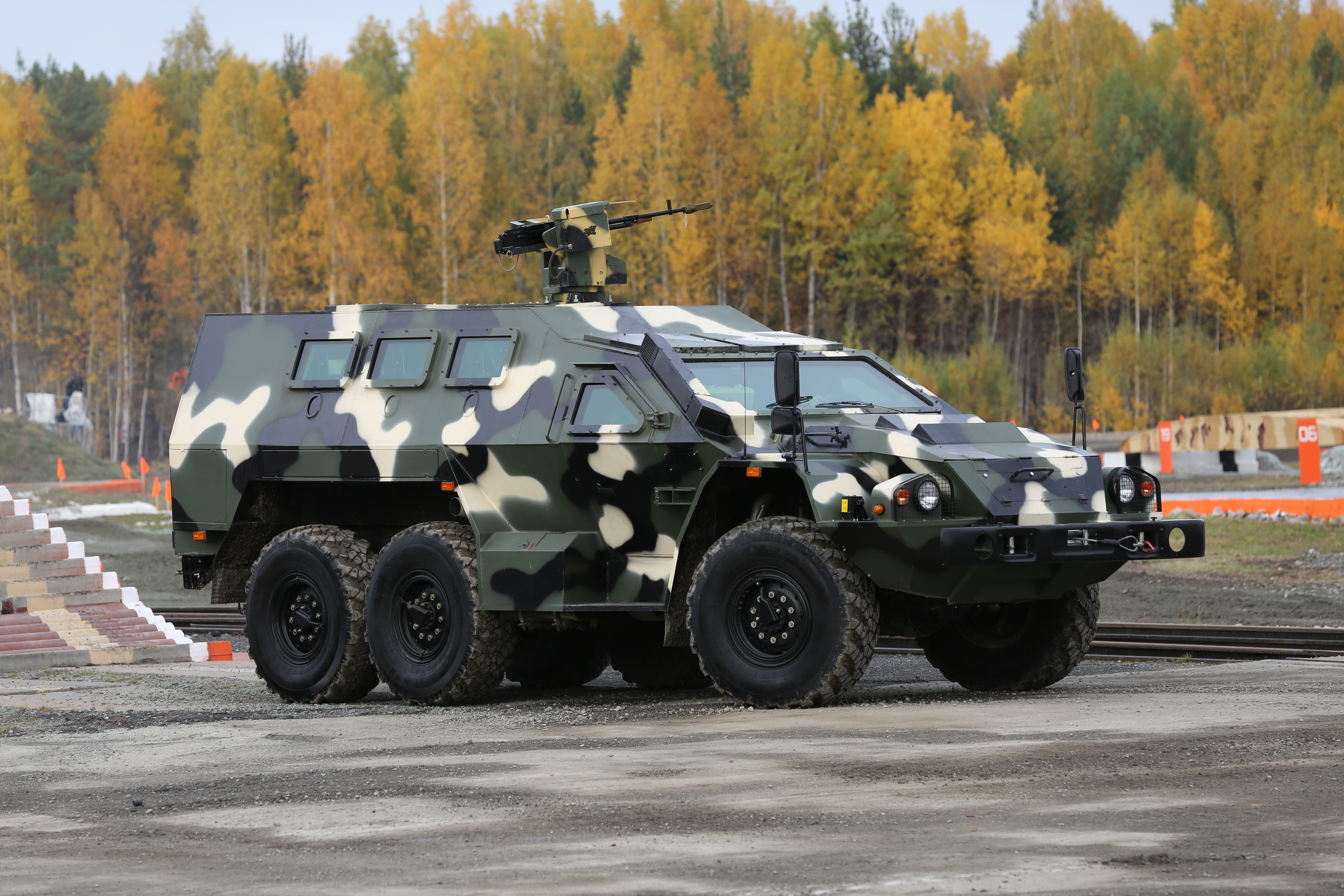
SBA-60K2 Bulat with remote weapons turret

In 2008, KamAZ planned to create a similar three-and four-axle vehicle designed for 13 and 18 men, respectively.

In 2009, vif2ne.ru published photographs of 3 and 4-axle armored vehicles similar to the "Shot" design. Later, photographs appeared of a triaxial armored car, presumably called "Item 69501".

In 2010, the JSC "Krasnodar Instrument Factory Cascade" announced the "15M107" machine based upon the KAMAZ-43269 "The Shot". It is intended for remote search and the clearance of minefields, having in its composition electronic administration circuits.

JSC Zashchita (Protection) Company produces the SBA-60K2 "Bulat", an enlarged 6×6 version of the BPM-97, based on components of the KAMAZ 6×6.

== Operators ==
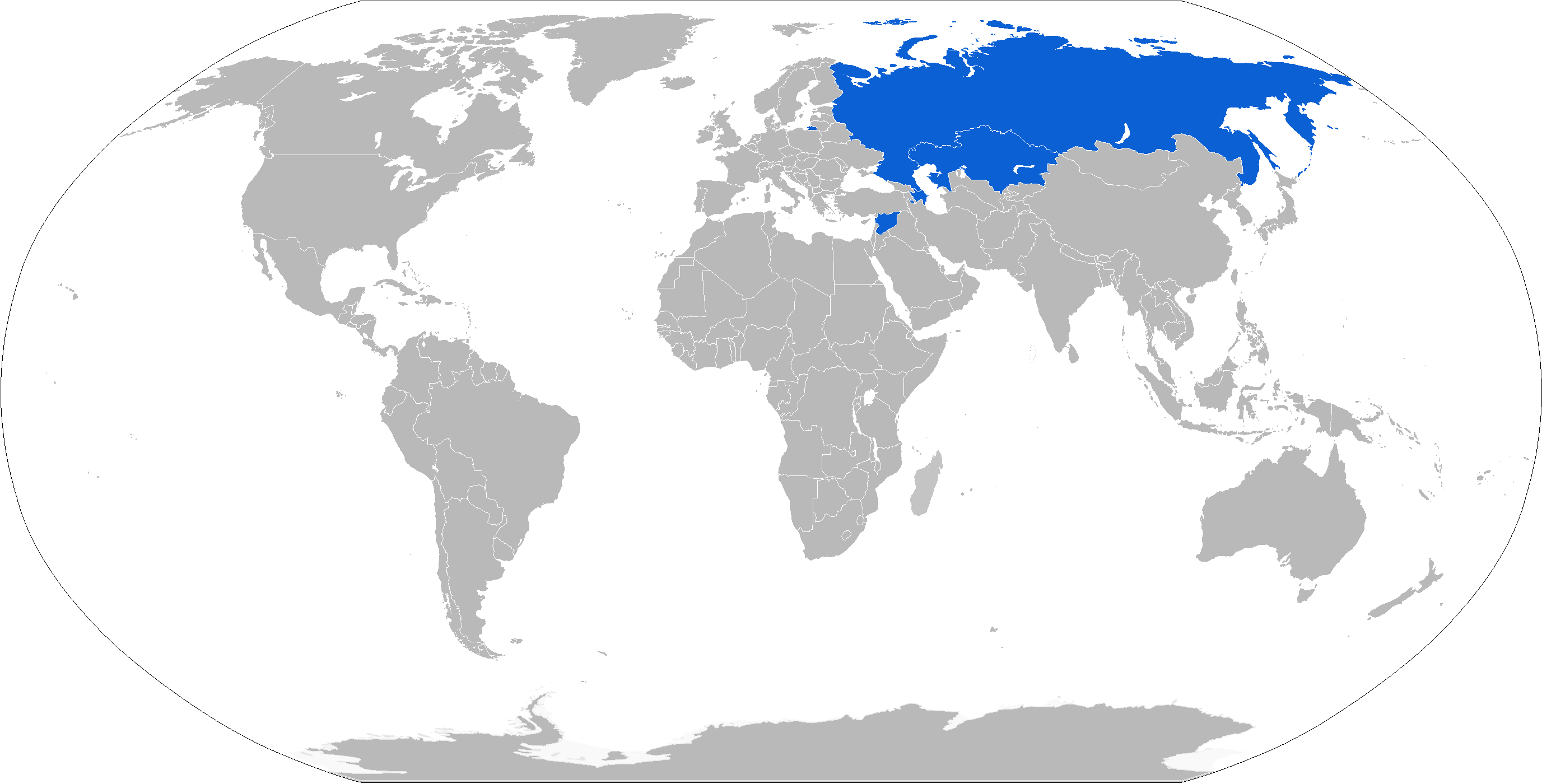
A map of BPM-97 operators in blue

=== Current operators ===
- Azerbaijan
- Kazakhstan
- Russia
- Syria
- Ukraine: Captured BPM-97s have been in service with the Ukrainian army since October 2022. Of the three captured vehicles, two of them appear in photos where they have been repainted with Ukrainian markings.

== Gallery ==
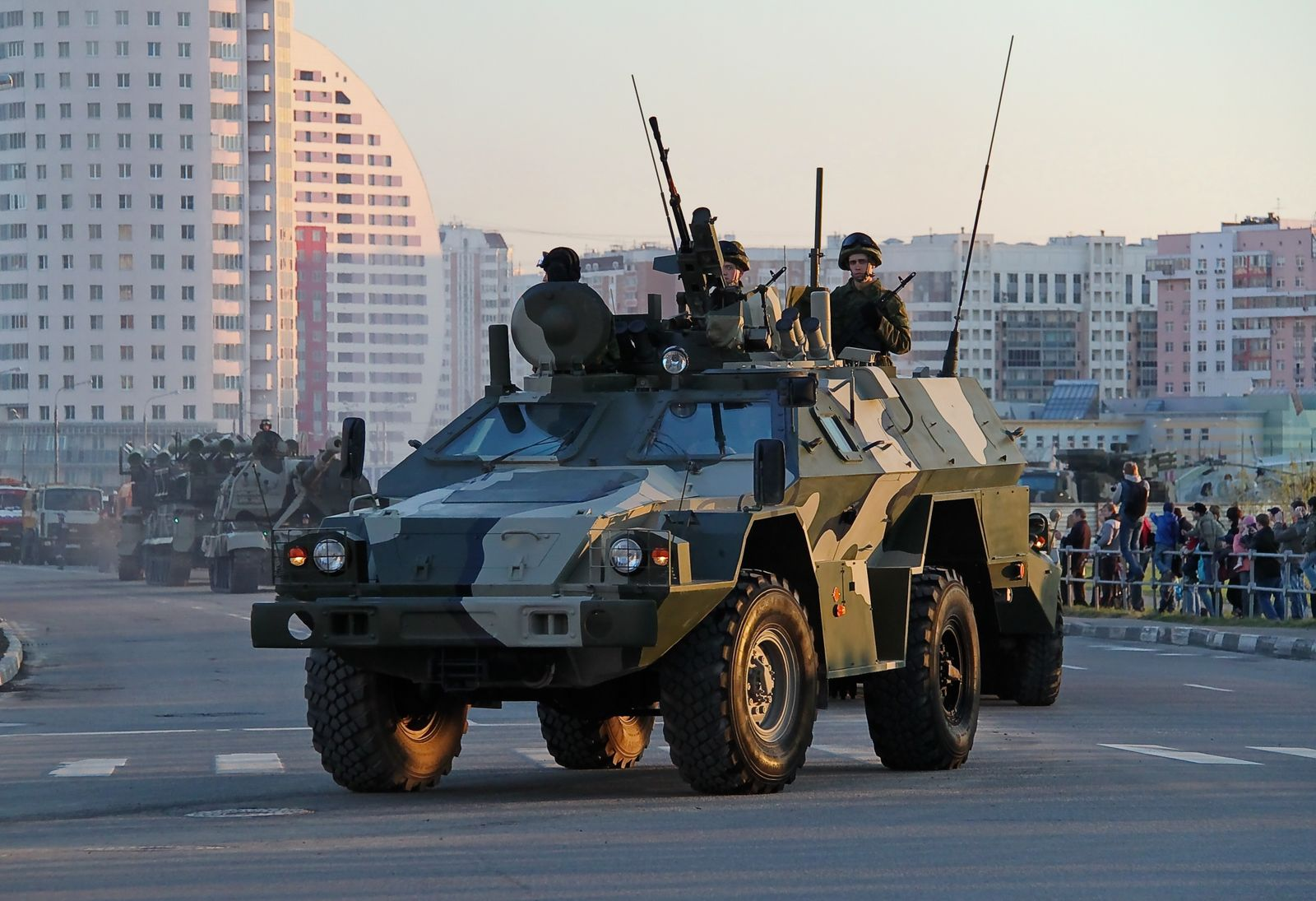
BPM-97

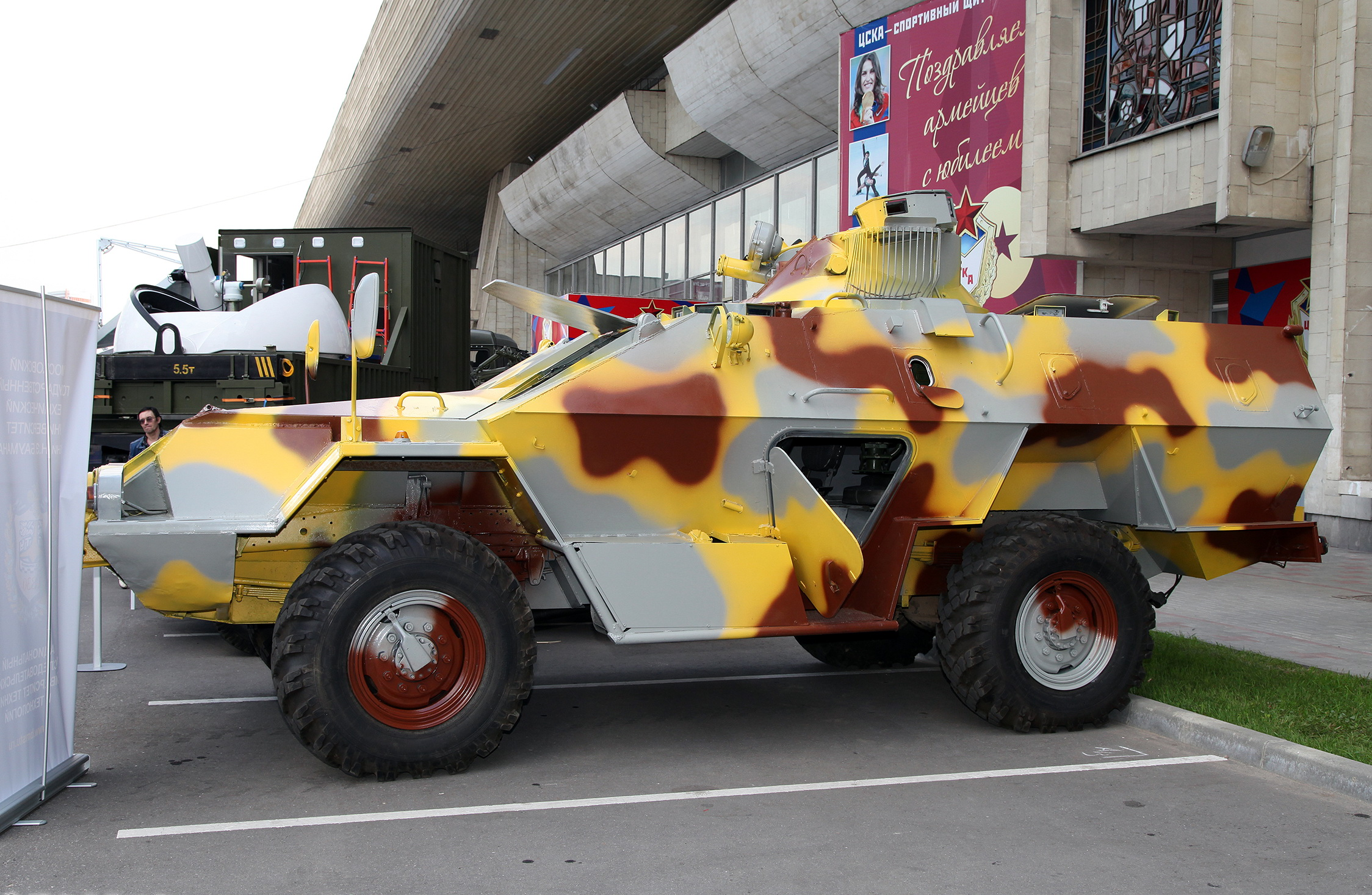
BPM-97 at Innovation Day 2013

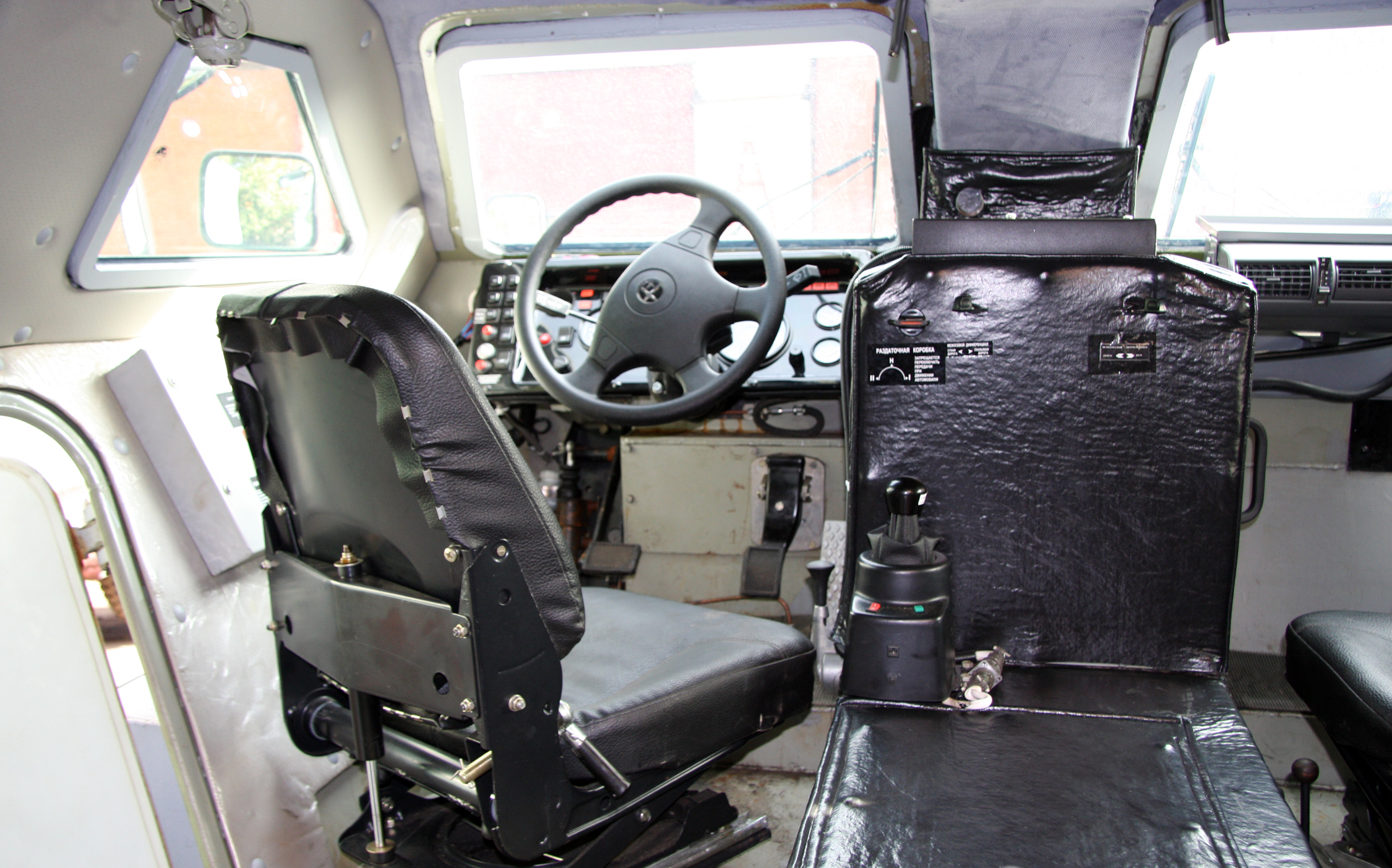
Driver's position

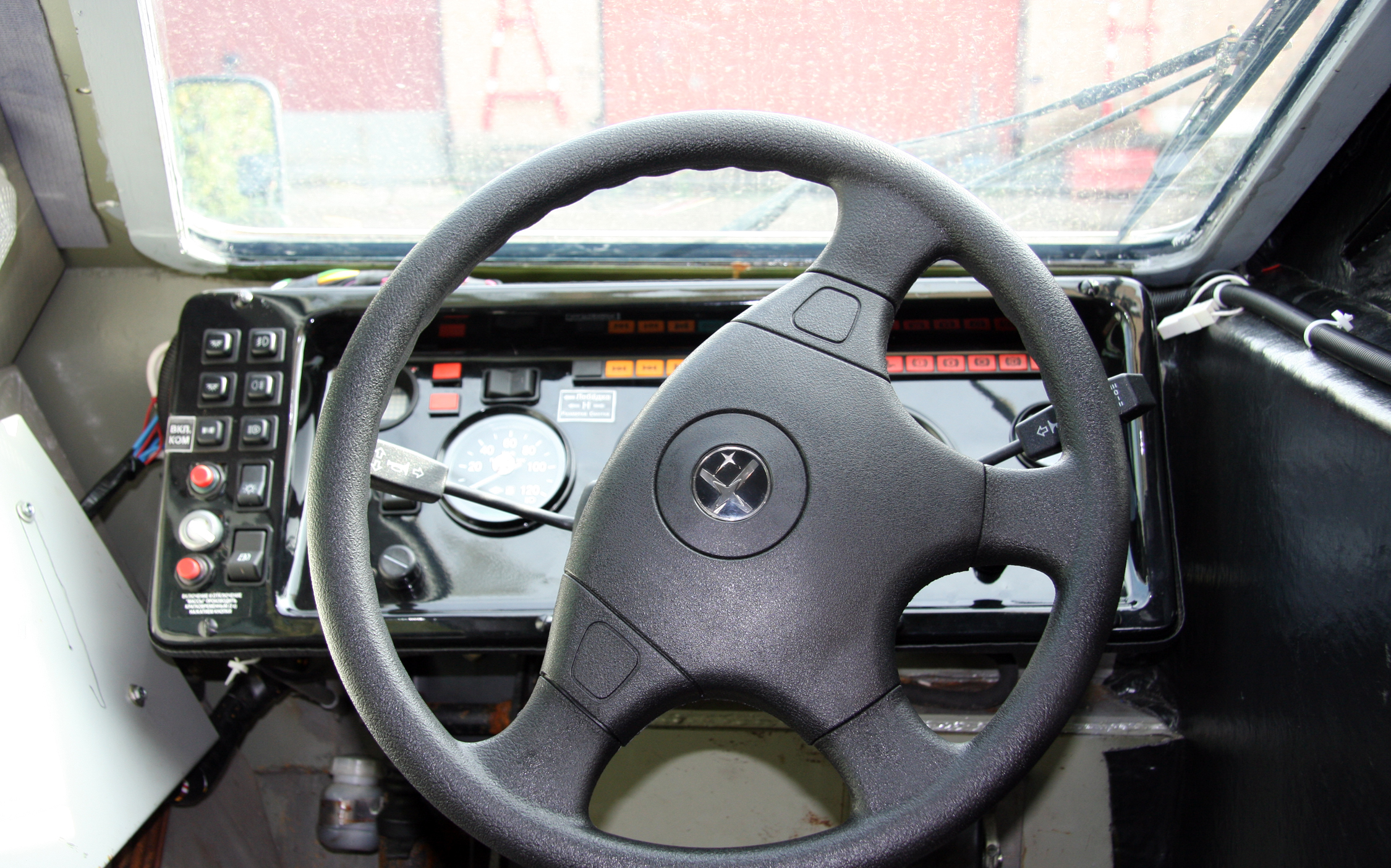
Driver's dashboard

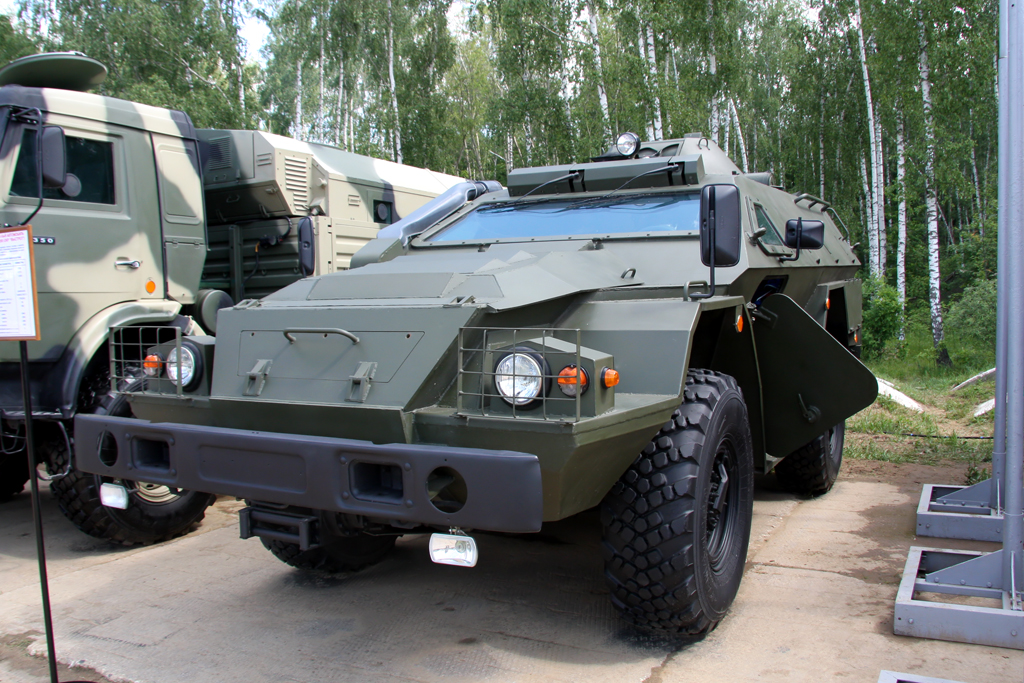
Upgraded KAMAZ-43269 Vistrel

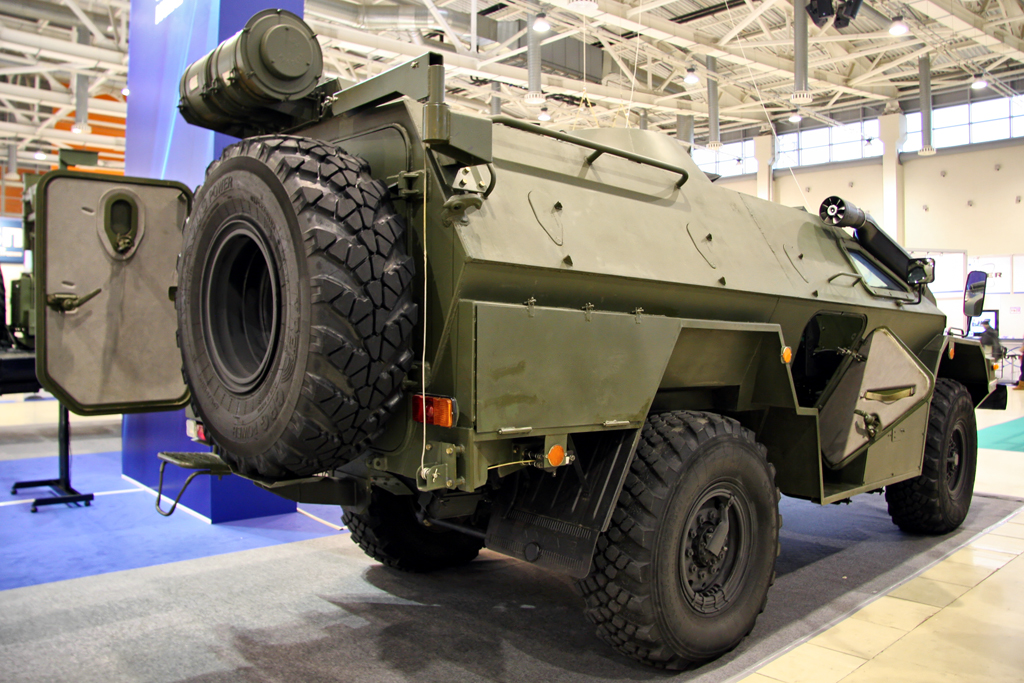
Upgraded KAMAZ-43269 Vistrel

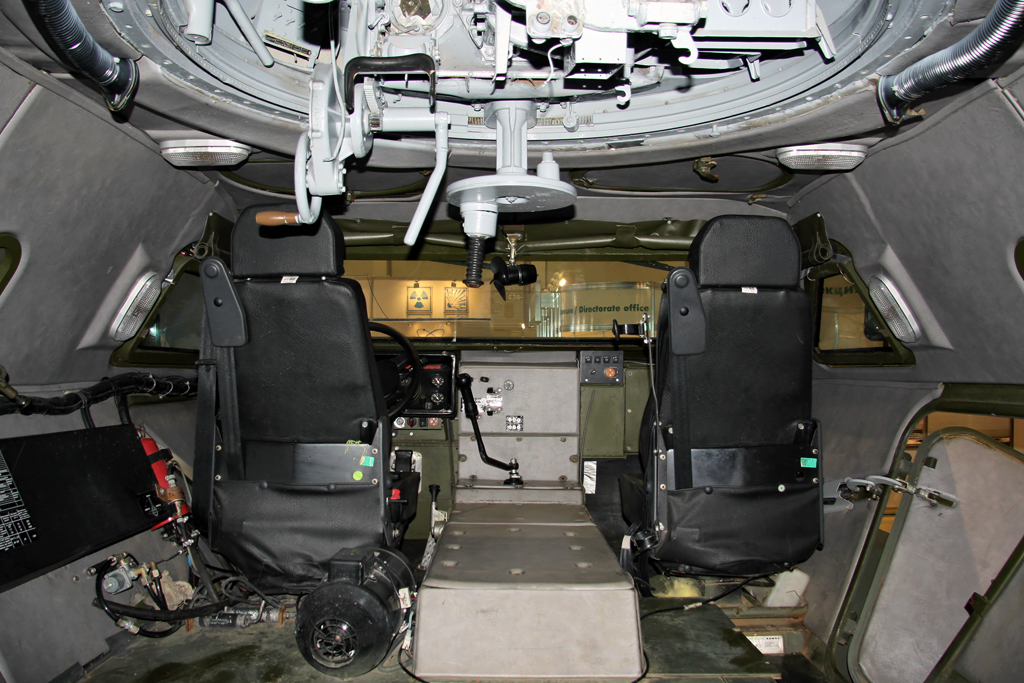
Upgraded KAMAZ-43269 Vistrel

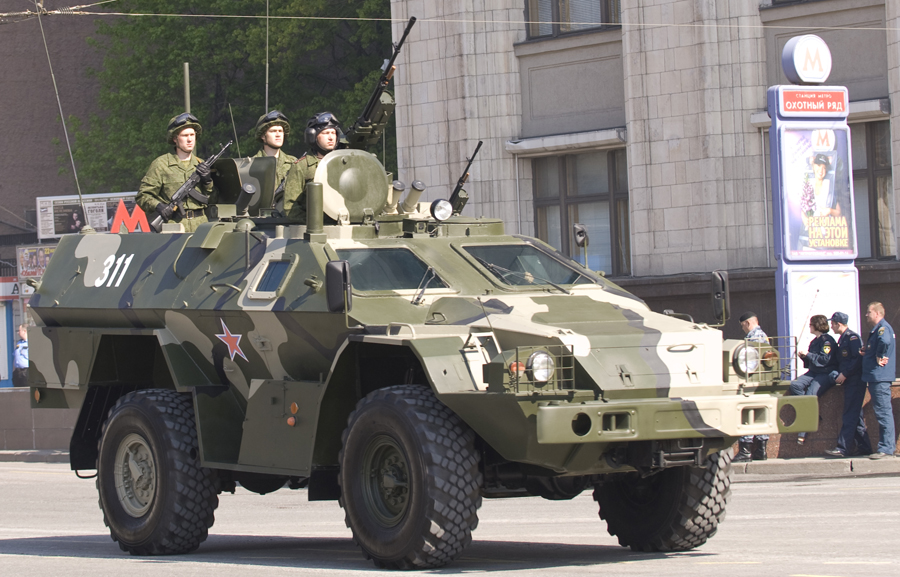
Russian BPM-97 in 2010

== See also ==
- Bulat (APC) – (Russia)
- Didgori-2 – (Georgia)
- BTR-40 – (Soviet Union)
