= 249th Separate Special Motorized Battalion South =

- 249-й отдельный специальный моторизованный батальон «Юг»
- Active: 2006-present
- Country: Russia
- Allegiance: Ramzan Kadyrov
- Type: National Guard of Russia
- Role: Motorized infantry
- Size: 300
- Part of: 46th Separate Operational Purpose Brigade

Commanders
- Current commander: Saydi Lorsankev

The 249th Separate Special Motorized Battalion "South" (Russian: 249-й отдельный специальный моторизованный батальон «Юг») is a military formation within the 46th Separate Operational Purpose Brigade of the Russian National Guard, stationed in the Vedensky District of the Chechen Republic. It is considered one of the elite units in the Russian Federation. It was formed on May 29, 2006, during the Second Chechen War, and since then has taken an active part in conducting more than 6,960 different counter-terrorist operations in the North Caucasus Federal District.

On April 27, 2007, in the Shatoi region, a Mi-8 helicopter crashed, carrying three crew members and fifteen battalion fighters. All on board were killed. There are three versions of the crash: technical malfunction, pilot error, and militant shelling.

== Combat use ==
Since early February 2022, it has been taking part in Russia's invasion of Ukraine.

== Commanders ==
- Muslim Ilyasov
- Anzor Magomadov
- Khusein Mezhidov (2019–2022)
- Saidi Lorsankaev (2022–present)
