= Debaltseve urban hromada =

Debaltseve urban hromada Дебальцівська міська громада
- Hromada
- Interactive map of Debaltseve urban hromada
- Country: Ukraine
- Oblast: Donetsk Oblast
- Raion: Horlivka Raion
- Settlements: 7
- Cities: 1
- Villages: 6

Debaltseve urban hromada (Ukrainian: Дебальцівська міська громада) is a hromada of Ukraine, located in Horlivka Raion, Donetsk Oblast. Its administrative center is the city Debaltseve.

The hromada contains 7 settlements, 1 city (Debaltseve) and 6 villages:

- Debaltsivske
- Kalynivka
- Lohvynove
- Novohryhorivka
- Nyzhnie Lozove
- Sanzharivka

== See also ==
- List of hromadas of Ukraine
