= Amina Okueva =

Ukrainian surgeon and servicewoman

Amina Viktorivna Okueva
- Аміна Вікторівна Окуєва
- Born: Natalia Viktorivna Nikiforova; 5 June 1983; Odesa, Ukrainian SSR, Soviet Union
- Died: 30 October 2017 (aged 34); Hlevakha, Vasylkiv Raion, Kyiv Oblast, Ukraine
- Other name: Anastasiya
- Education: Odesa National Medical University
- Occupation: Police Lieutenant of the Ministry of Internal Affairs of Ukraine
- Spouses: Isa Mustafinov (m. 2000; died 2003); Islam Tukhashev (divorced); Adam Osmayev (m. 2009)
- Awards: People's Hero of Ukraine

Amina Viktorivna Okueva (Note: Ukrainian: Аміна Вікторівна Окуєва) (born Natalia Viktorivna Nikiforova; (Note: Ukrainian: Наталія Нікіфорова) 5 June 1983 – 30 October 2017) was a Ukrainian-born doctor of Chechen-Polish descent, Euromaidan activist, convert to Islam, and police lieutenant. During the Euromaidan she worked as a medic in the Kyiv-2 battalion and saw combat in the city of Debaltseve after it was taken over by Russian-aligned rebels in 2015. She was killed in an ambush by unknown attackers on 30 October 2017. Her husband Adam Osmayev, a leader of the Dzhokhar Dudayev Battalion, was injured in the ambush but survived.

== Early life ==
Okueva was born Natalia Viktorivna Nikiforova in Odesa in 1983. An only child, and the daughter of a Chechen father and a Polish mother from the North Caucasus, Okueva did not know her father due to his early death. She lived with her family in Moscow and Grozny before moving back to Ukraine in 2003 after fighting on the side of the Chechen Republic of Ichkeria the Second Chechen War, having converted to Islam at the age of 17. After her conversion and marriage to Isa Mustafinov, she changed her first name to Amina. She changed her surname to Okueva after a second marriage.

Upon arrival in Ukraine she enrolled at the Odesa National Medical University where she specialized in general surgery before working as an intern at a local hospital. She was married three times; her first husband, Isa Mustafinov, whom she married in 2000, died in 2003 during the Second Chechen War. Islam Tukhashev, her second husband, was deported from Ukraine for illegally staying in the country and was later sentenced to life imprisonment in Russia for the murder of Russian intelligence officers in Ingushetia; due to his residency status the marriage was not registered in Ukraine. In 2009 she met Adam Osmayev, who is currently accused of attempting to assassinate Vladimir Putin; they later had a wedding ceremony but did not officially register the marriage.

== Euromaidan, military, and political activities ==
After the start of Euromaidan she joined a unit of Afghanistan veterans by staffing a medical tent during the protests. She joined the "Kyiv-2" battalion to serve as a paramedic in Eastern Ukraine after the start of the conflict, but she did not practice medicine much while she was there, and directly participated in the Battle of Debaltseve in Luhansk Oblast. She also served as press secretary for the Dzhokhar Dudayev Battalion.

She ran in the 2014 parliamentary election as a self-nominated candidate for the Suvorovskyi Raion (now Peresypskyi Raion) of Odesa while she was a police officer of the Ministry of Internal Affairs; she received only 3.72% of the vote, putting her in ninth place.

== Attempted assassination ==
A man masquerading as a French journalist from Le Monde opened fire on Okueva and her husband, severely injuring him, while they were in their car on Kyrylivska Street in Kyiv on 1 June 2017. Okueva managed to fire four rounds into the attacker; the police were able to detain the suspect and begin proceedings, in which they initially identified him not as a French journalist but as a citizen of Ukraine by the name of Aleksander Dakar. Dakar was later identified as Arthur Abdulayevich Denisultanov, who is suspected of killing Umar Israilov, a former bodyguard of Ramzan Kadyrov. Israilov had accused Kadyrov of supporting human rights violations. Arthur Denisultanov was, as part of a prisoner exchange, released and handed over to the Donetsk People's Republic on 29 December 2019.

== Death ==
Okueva was killed in a military-style ambush on 30 October 2017 near the village of Hlevakha, Kyiv Oblast. Unidentified attackers opened fire on the car containing her and her husband while it slowed by a railroad crossing, firing five rounds into her including two fatal rounds into her head. Her husband Osmaev was only injured in the leg and began first aid before calling for emergency services and driving away, but was not successful in his efforts to save her. Spokesman for the Ministry of Internal Affairs of Ukraine stated that the Russian military may have been involved, although the identity of the attackers remains unknown.

Okueva was buried in Dnipro in the Muslim section of the Krasnopil cemetery near the Dnieper on 1 November 2017, next to the grave of Isa Munayev, where she stated in her will she wanted to be buried. Her family did not attend the public farewell ceremony fearing that the event could become a target for an attack, and the funeral itself took place under armed guard.

== Legacy ==
An exhibition titled "Amina: Life" opened in the Verkhovna Rada less than a month after her death. It featured 34 photographs of Okueva.

In November 2019 the Kyiv City Council decided to rename the Proektna Street in Kyiv's Shevchenkivskyi District after Okueva. In June 2020 the Dnipro city council decided a new street in the city's Amur-Nyzhnodniprovskyi District will be named after Okueva; an earlier attempt to rename the local Populus Street in her honour had not been supported by its residents.
