= Dzhokhar Dudayev Battalion =

Anti-Russian Chechen volunteer unit

- Чеченський миротворчий батальйон імені Джохара Дудаєва (Ukrainian)
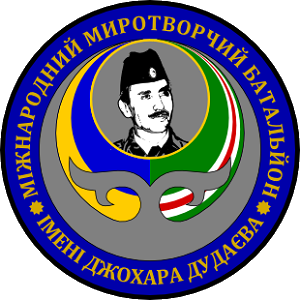
- Battalion sleeve insignia.
- Founded: 2014
- Country: Ukraine
- Allegiance: Chechen Republic of Ichkeria; Ukraine
- Branch: Ukrainian Ground Forces
- Type: Battalion
- Size: Several hundred
- Patron: Dzhokhar Dudayev
- Motto: Marşo ya joƶalla ("Freedom or Death")
- Colors: Ukraine; Chechen Republic of Ichkeria
- Engagements: War in Donbas; Battle of Ilovaisk; Battle of Debaltseve; Russian invasion of Ukraine; Battle of Kyiv (2022); Kyiv offensive (2022); Battle of Kharkiv (2022); Battle of Izium (2022); Battle of Bakhmut

Commanders
- Current commander: Adam Osmayev
- Notable commanders: Isa Munayev †

Insignia
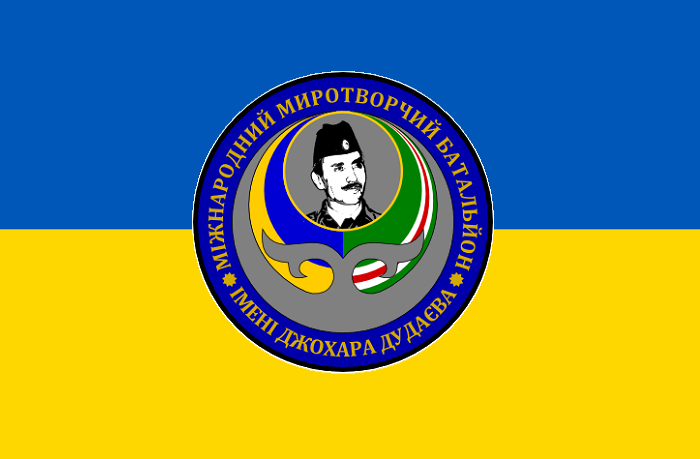
- Flag

The Dzhokhar Dudayev Chechen Peacekeeping Battalion (Ukrainian: Чеченський миротворчий батальйон імені Джохара Дудаєва, romanized: Chechenskyi myrotvorchyi batalion imeni Dzhokhara Dudaieva) is a Chechen volunteer battalion named after the first President of the Chechen Republic of Ichkeria, Dzhokhar Dudayev. The battalion is made up of Chechen volunteers, many of whom fought in the First Chechen War and Second Chechen War on the side of the Republic of Ichkeria, Ingush, Crimean Tatars and Ukrainians.

The battalion has been under the command of Adam Osmayev since 1 February 2015, after Isa Munayev was killed in action at the Battle of Debaltseve in Eastern Ukraine.

The Dzhokhar Dudayev Battalion is one of several Chechen armed formations on the side of Ukraine.

== Creation ==
The creation of the battalion began in early March 2014 in Denmark. This is where a large number of Chechens, opposed to Russia and forced to emigrate after the Second Russian-Chechen War, are located. It was initiated by the Free Caucasus Organization, which was created in 2006 in Denmark by political emigrants from Caucasus countries in Europe.

On March 26, it was announced that the 1st company of the International Peacekeeping Battalion named after Dzhokhar Dudayev would be named after Sashko Biliy (Oleksandr Muzychko). The 2nd company is named after Khamzat Gelayev. The battalion's founder and first leader Isa Munayev was appointed a military commander in charge of the defense of the Chechen capital by Ichkeria's President Aslan Maskhadov during the Battle of Grozny (1999–2000) where he used various urban warfare tactics including ambushes, car bombs, and mines during the defense of the city.

== Participation in warfare ==
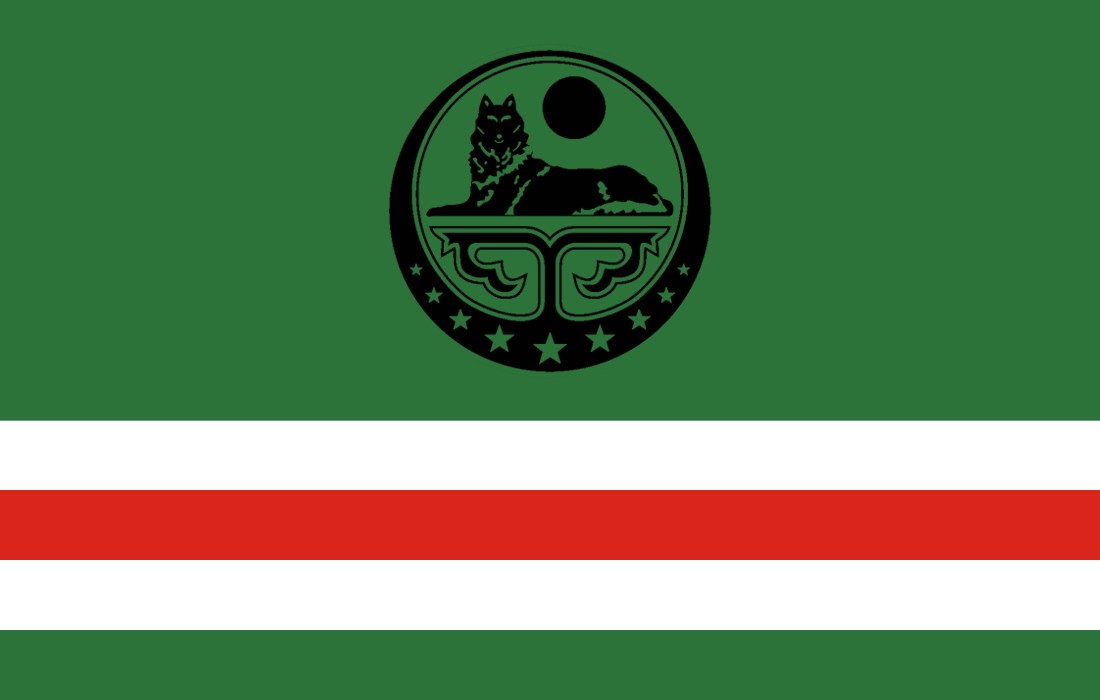
The flag of the Chechen Republic of Ichkeria is used by the battalion.

After the creation of the battalion in 2014, it has actively fought in the Donetsk region of Ukraine. It participated in the 2014 Battle of Ilovaisk.
During the 2015 Battle of Debaltseve, the battalion led by its commander Isa Munayev took part in the intense fighting around the city. Fighters of the battalion led by Munayev organized raids behind the lines of the pro-Russian forces, attacking the command posts, artillery, rocket launchers and entrenched tanks. On February 1, Munayev was killed in action after being hit by shrapnel from a tank shell.

Chechen specialists take part in battles in Eastern Ukraine and work as instructors, training young commanders.

After the Russian invasion of Ukraine, the battalion took part in the defense of Ukraine fighting in the Kyiv area against Russian forces.
The Russian invasion of Ukraine saw the group receive a huge influx of new members. After the defence of Kyiv and the successful Kyiv counteroffensive against Russian troops, the battalion was deployed around the Kharkiv and Donetsk regions.

Since then, the battalion has fought in the Battle of Kharkiv and Battle of Izium. Since November 2022, units have been deployed in Battle of Bakhmut, which has seen the scenes of intense fighting.

== Structure ==
- Separate reconnaissance Group "Adam"
  - 1st Company
  - 2nd Company
  - Scout Platoon

== Notable members ==
- İsa Sadıqov, Chief of Staff of the Dzhokhar Dudayev Battalion. Former Colonel of the Azerbaijani Armed Forces, former Deputy Minister of Defense of Azerbaijan (1993–1995), former head of the Union of Officers of Azerbaijan. Wanted by the Azerbaijani government.
- Sergey Melnikoff, a photographer with US citizenship. Holder of the Order of the Hero of Ichkeria.
- Nureddin Ismailov, he commanded the Boz Qurd (lit. "Grey Wolves") detachment during the Karabakh war
- Shamil Tsuneoka Tanaka, a Japanese journalist, converted to Islam in 2001 while being a member of Gelayev's detachment that took part in the conflict in the Kodori Gorge
- Amina Okueva, a.k.a. Natalia Kaminskaya or Amina Mustafinova, wife of Adam Osmayev, press secretary of the Dzhokhar Dudayev Battalion

== See also ==
- Sheikh Mansur Battalion
- Separate Special Purpose Battalion
- List of military units named after people
