= Debaltseve =

City in Donetsk Oblast, Ukraine

Debaltseve Дебальцеве
- City
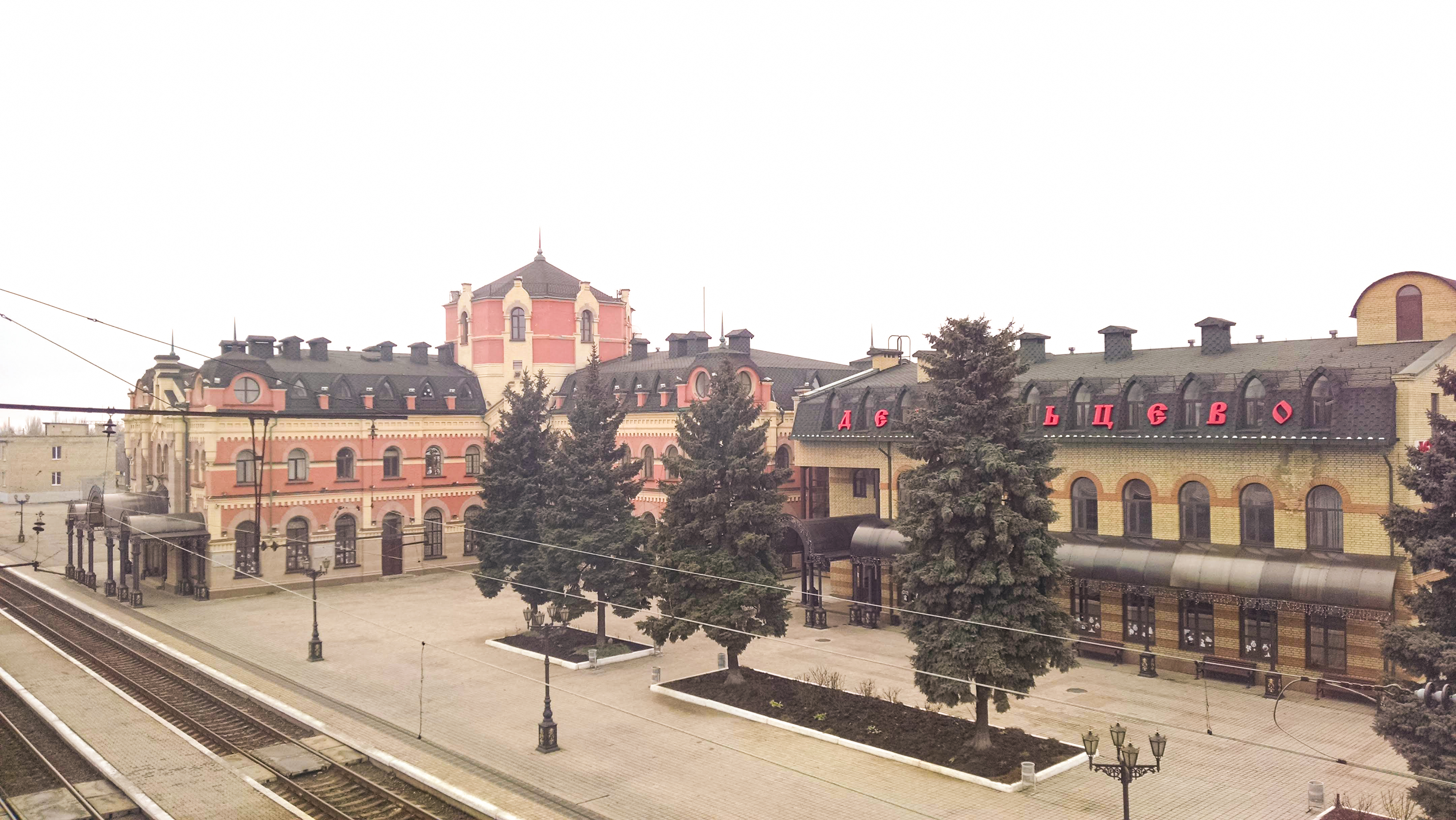
- Debaltseve railway station in 2019

- Flag Coat of arms
- Interactive map of Debaltseve
- Location within Donetsk Oblast Location within Ukraine
- Coordinates: 48°20′N 38°24′E
- Country: Ukraine
- Oblast: Donetsk Oblast
- Raion: Horlivka Raion
- Hromada: Debaltseve urban hromada
- Founded: 1878
- Area: 24.31 km^{2} (9.39 sq mi)
- Elevation: 308 m (1,010 ft)
- Population (2021): 24,209
- Climate: Dfb

Debaltseve (Ukrainian: Дебальцеве, IPA: [deˈbɑlʲtsewe]) or Debaltsevo (Russian: Дебальцево), is a city in Horlivka Raion, Donetsk Oblast, Ukraine, currently occupied by Russia as part of the Donetsk People's Republic. The city is situated on the eastern edge of Donetsk Oblast, and borders Luhansk Oblast. Population: 24,209 (2022 estimate).

On 18 February 2015, after the Battle of Debaltseve, the town was captured by the Russian separatist forces.

== Geography ==
Distance from Donetsk: by road - 74 km, by air – 58 km. Distance from Kyiv: by road - 803 km, by rail - 797 km. The administrative boundary between the Donetsk and Luhansk oblasts lies along with the eastern limits of the city.

The city is located on a hill from which many Donbas rivers originate. The river Bulavin (a tributary of the river Krynka, Mius basin) originates in the southern outskirts of the city, the river Lozova (a tributary of the river Luhan, Siverskyi Donets basin) in the north-east, the river Sanzharivka (a tributary of the river Luhan) in the north, the river Skelevaya (a tributary of the river Lugan) in the north-west, and the river Karapulka (a tributary of the river Luhan) in the western outskirts.

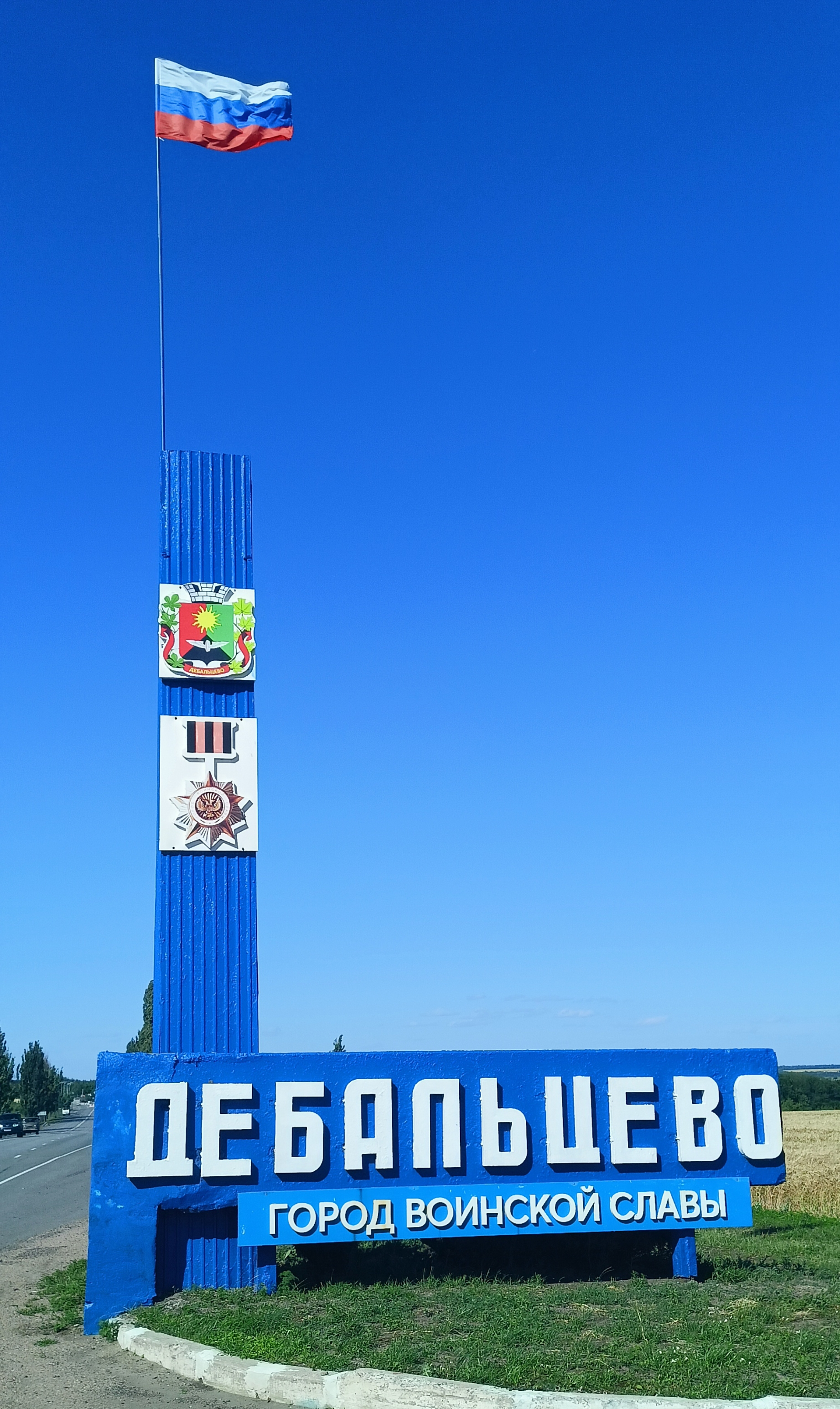
City entrance stele of Debaltseve in 2024, built by Russian authorities

=== Neighboring towns and villages ===
- North: Sanzharivka, Novohryhorivka.
- North-West: Nyzhnie Lozove, Lohvynove.
- North-East: Verhulivka, Komisarivka, Borzhykivka – Luhansk oblast.
- West: Debaltsivske, Kalynivka.
- East: Chornukhyne, Kruhlyk, Depreradivka – Luhansk oblast.
- South-West: Bulavyne, Savelivka, Hrozne.
- South-East: Ridkodub (Vuhlehirsk urban hromada), Ridkodub (Khrestivka urban hromada).
- South: Illinka.

=== City districts ===
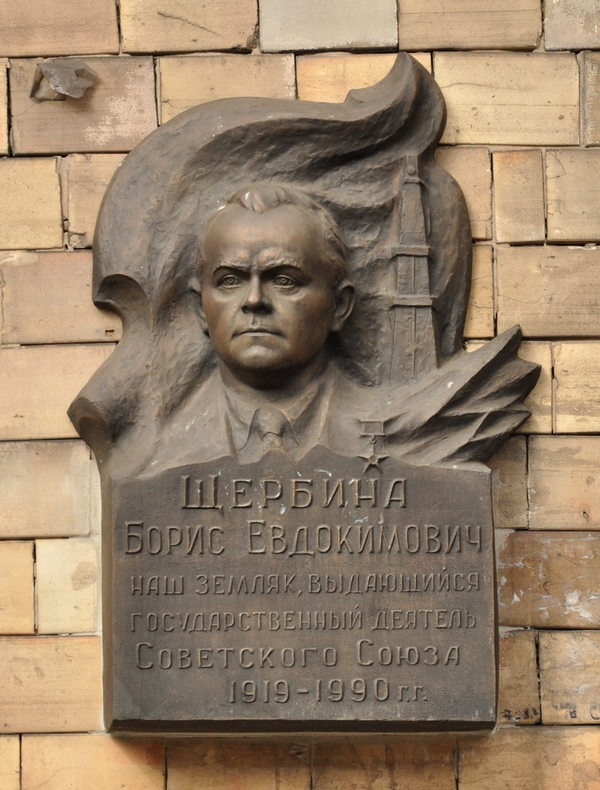
Memorial plaque to Boris Shcherbina, a figure of the Communist Party of the Soviet Union

- The "Centre" district occupies the central part of the city. Here the main administrative agencies are located - the City Council and the executive committee, the police department, the city communications centre and others. The railway station, locomotive depot and passenger carriage depot are also located here.
- The "Cheriomushki" microdistrict is located in the western part of the city. It was built in the 1970s on drained swamps. It consists of four- and five-storey buildings. The district comprises Debaltseve College of Transport Infrastructure (currently non-operational), a secondary school No. 4, a kindergarten No. 4, and an Oschadbank office. On the outskirts of the district, the Railway Hospital is located.
- The Ryazantseva (local name - "Ryazan") settlement named in honor of Russian Civil War participant F.A. Ryazantsev and is located in the southeast of Debaltseve. The Znamyanka-Luhansk-Izvarine (M-04) highway passes through the settlement. The area consists of private houses. Here you can find a secondary school No. 2. The Solona valley acts as a natural boundary to the east.
- The Factory (Zavodskyi) settlement is one of the oldest districts of the city. It was founded in the late ХІХ century next to a mechanical factory. In Soviet times it was gentrified and landscaped. It consists of two- and five-storey buildings. The city sanitary-epidemiological station, Centre for Culture and Leisure (former factory Cultural Palace), an Ukrtelecom office, a kindergarten and a stadium "Avanhard" are all located here.
- The Tolstova (local name - "Tolstovka") settlement in the eastern outskirts of the city, is named after A.N. Tolstoy, Soviet writer who in "The Frosty Night" ("Moroznaya Noch") described the events in Debaltseve station during the Ukrainian War of Independence/Russian Civil War. The settlement consists of private buildings. There is the Central City Hospital and the Hill of Glory (Kholm Slavy) in the area.
- The "Eastern" (Skhidnyi) microdistrict is one of the "youngest" districts of the city and consists of typical five-storey buildings. According to a planned project, the district should have been merged with another, the "50th anniversary of the Victory". However, this was never followed through. A school, No. 1, a kindergarten and a vocational training school can be found here. A pilot heating project was implemented resulting in the construction of an electric boiler house.
- The Konyaeva settlement bears the name of Mykola Koniaev- a participant of two revolutions who on 28 December 1917, was shot dead on a platform of Debaltseve railway station by Don Cossacks. The settlement consists of private buildings and stretches along the railway. There is a city bakery and also both City & Railway Fire Stations in this district.
- The "50th anniversary of the Victory" microdistrict consists of mixed buildings. Multi-storey buildings in the north of the district graduate into smaller private dwellings. The neighbourhood is on north-eastern outskirts of Debaltseve. The district is closely connected to the adjacent railway companies. There are a secondary school, No. 6, a kindergarten and a militarized security facility of Donetsk railway in this district. It is also known as a train stop "The First Platform" (Платформа N 1, Persha/Pervaya Ploschadka).
- The "Festivalnyi" microdistrict is a "young" district which is located in the north of the city and consists of multi-storey buildings. There are many railway facilities (a carriage sorting depot, an asphalt factory, a track machine station No. 9 (Russian: ПМС-9 PMS-9), a meteorological station, a sports complex "We", and train stops "Wheel" (Колісний, Kolisnyi) and "Meteorological" (Метеорологічний, Meteorolohichnyi)) in this area.
- The "8 March" settlement is adjacent to the railway. The settlement is the northern outskirts of Debaltseve consisting of private houses. It is one of the most remote areas from the centre of the city. There is a school, No. 7, a kindergarten and a Mechanical track repairing factory (Russian: КРМЗ, KRMZ) in this settlement.
- The Oktyabrskiy (Zhovtnevyi) settlement is on the north-eastern outskirts of Debaltseve. It is the most distant district in the centre of the city. The settlement has railway branch lines to Chornukhyne and Luhansk, and an access road to the Znamianka-Luhansk-Izvaryne (M-04) highway. A locomotive depot Debaltseve-Sorting (Ukrainian: Дебальцеве-Сортувальна, romanized: Debaltseve-Sortuvalna) is also located here. The settlement is locally known as "The Second Platform" (Платформа N 2, Druha/Vtoraya Ploschadka) after a train stop.

=== Climate ===
Climate data for Debaltseve (1981–2010, extremes 1936–2005)
Month	Jan	Feb	Mar	Apr	May	Jun	Jul	Aug	Sep	Oct	Nov	Dec	Year
Record high °C (°F)	9.7 (49.5)	15.4 (59.7)	20.5 (68.9)	28.8 (83.8)	33.6 (92.5)	36.0 (96.8)	39.4 (102.9)	37.3 (99.1)	32.8 (91.0)	31.0 (87.8)	19.9 (67.8)	13.0 (55.4)	39.4 (102.9)
Mean daily maximum °C (°F)	−2.6 (27.3)	−2.2 (28.0)	3.9 (39.0)	13.7 (56.7)	20.3 (68.5)	24.5 (76.1)	26.8 (80.2)	26.3 (79.3)	20.0 (68.0)	12.1 (53.8)	3.6 (38.5)	−1.5 (29.3)	12.1 (53.8)
Daily mean °C (°F)	−5.2 (22.6)	−5.2 (22.6)	0.1 (32.2)	8.6 (47.5)	15.0 (59.0)	18.9 (66.0)	21.2 (70.2)	20.5 (68.9)	14.6 (58.3)	7.7 (45.9)	1.2 (34.2)	−3.9 (25.0)	7.8 (46.0)
Mean daily minimum °C (°F)	−7.7 (18.1)	−8.1 (17.4)	−3.1 (26.4)	4.3 (39.7)	10.1 (50.2)	14.1 (57.4)	16.3 (61.3)	15.2 (59.4)	9.9 (49.8)	4.0 (39.2)	−2.1 (28.2)	−6.4 (20.5)	3.9 (39.0)
Record low °C (°F)	−34.9 (−30.8)	−30.9 (−23.6)	−25.5 (−13.9)	−11.1 (12.0)	−3.8 (25.2)	1.8 (35.2)	6.1 (43.0)	2.1 (35.8)	−4.8 (23.4)	−12.0 (10.4)	−24.8 (−12.6)	−31.2 (−24.2)	−34.9 (−30.8)
Average precipitation mm (inches)	50.6 (1.99)	41.9 (1.65)	42.9 (1.69)	43.4 (1.71)	49.4 (1.94)	64.5 (2.54)	67.9 (2.67)	33.0 (1.30)	48.4 (1.91)	44.0 (1.73)	51.8 (2.04)	55.9 (2.20)	593.7 (23.37)
Average precipitation days (≥ 1.0 mm)	10.1	8.7	9.3	7.5	7.1	8.5	7.1	4.8	6.6	6.3	8.5	10.6	95.1
Average relative humidity (%)	90.7	87.2	81.0	67.2	61.4	64.0	63.9	60.7	67.7	78.1	88.6	91.0	75.1
Mean monthly sunshine hours	48.2	72.1	131.5	179.3	276.7	291.9	306.0	290.0	210.6	129.8	61.7	34.7	2,032.5
Source 1: World Meteorological Organization
Source 2: Climatebase.ru (extremes)

== History ==
=== Pre-war period ===
Debaltseve city was founded in 1878 as a railway station due to the construction of the Catherine Railway (special government railway of Russian empire built in 1882–1904). Though at that time this station was well-equipped, it had a number of disadvantages: lack of office buildings, nowhere to place inspectors, a railway hospital was a room with eight beds in a paramedic's apartment. On 1 December 1878, regular train traffic commenced at the Donetsk coal line. The station has been built by landless peasants and poor people from surrounding villages. By 1897, 2048 people inhabited the village close by the railway station. From 25–27 November 1898, a first strike at the station took place. 60 pointsmen were not working demanding reduction of a 16-hour duty shift.

Originally, "Debaltseve" is associated with the neighbouring village Illinka which in the 19th century was given to the State Counselor Ilya Deboltsov (born in 1747 - buried in 1827) for taking part in the suppression of the uprising of the Decembrists in 1825. After a while, Illinka got its second informal name - Deboltsovka. That's how it was shown on maps of the 19th century, and the station which is based on the northern borders of the estate Deboltsova was named Debaltsevo.

In 1894, close to the station, a mechanical factory was built that produced building trusses, spans of railway bridges, trolleys for the narrow-gauge railway. On 1 May 1899, the first strike took place at the mechanical factory. First of all the strikers demanded to reduce the working day from 10 hours 30 minutes to 10 hours, secondly announce 1 May a non-working day, and lastly put an end to the arbitrariness of masters and improve living conditions. After assuring strikers to fulfill their demands, the administration failed to keep to its promises. As a result, on 3 May workers left the factory half an hour earlier. With the support of local authorities and the police, businessmen suppressed the strike, completely rejecting the workers' demands. On the eve of the Revolution in 1905 Social Democratic party was created. Mechanics T.E. Batyschenko, A.I. Vaschaev, A.F. Svistunov, S.P. Fedoseyev and locomotive drivers G.G. Larkin, L.G. Martynenko joined the party. Debaltseve workers took an active part in the first Russian revolution.

At the beginning of February 1905 in protest against the crackdown on the peaceful rally of workers in St. Petersburg employees of Debaltseve mechanical factory stopped working for a few days. On 1 May together with the railway workers, they arranged Mayovka in the forest.

In 1905-1908 a freight station and two depots were built. Carriage workshops were expanded as well. In 1911 Debaltseve population reached 20 thousand people. There were two small hospitals, an outpatient clinic, one parochial, one zemskaya (derivates from Zemstvo – elective district council in pre-revolutionary Russia) and one railway schools in the city.

=== 1917—1941 ===
During the February Revolution, the Civil War and up to the establishment of Soviet power in 1919, the city Debaltseve repeatedly passed "from hand to hand". At different periods of time in Debaltseve were Don Cossacks, and Denikin's forces and the Red Army. Already a few days after the October Revolution Central Council of Ukrainian People's Republic adopted the III Universal and they declared Debaltseve part of the Ukrainian People's Republic, the actual power in the city was established only during the reign of Hetman Skoropadskiy (from April to December 1918) when Donbas was occupied by the Austro-German troops. After in April 1918 troops loyal to the Ukrainian People's Republic took control of Debaltseve.

In 1919, Debaltseve was attacked by an armored train "Power to the Soviets!" (Russian: “Власть Советам!”, romanized: “Vlast Sovietam!”). The commander of the train was Ludmila Mokievskaya-Zubok (1896 – 9 May 1919, a Russian Red Army revolutionary, an active participant in the Civil War in 1918–1919, the only well-known woman - the commander of an armored train). During the battle for the station, she died. But after the Bolsheviks gained control over Debaltseve, troops of Lieutenant General Denikin re-took the city. The Soviet power in Debaltseve was established only by the end of 1919.

In 1921 Debaltseve received the status of uyezd city of Bakhmut (later - Yenakiieve) district of Donetsk governorate of Ukrainian SSR. In 1921, among the workers - 65.9% were employed in the transport field (at the railway station and workshops), 15.7% - office personnel. In 1925 there was a reconstruction of the mechanical factory. Now it was equipped for blast-furnace and rolling production. Debaltseve received a status of a “city” in 1938. By 1939, there were water supply and electricity. There were built a Palace of Culture for 1200 seats and a stadium. Moreover, a branch of the Kharkiv Institute of Railway started to operate in the city.

=== World War II ===
In early December 1941 in Debaltseve direction, offensive and defensive battles of World War II started. After German troops were defeated by the Red Army in the Battle of Rostov, Germany began offensive operations aiming to capture the Donbas. In this regard, the 52nd Italian division "Torino" and General Schwedler's troops were sent. At the front of the 12th Army began a fierce battle. The Red Army represented by the 71st NKVD Brigade (consisting of the 95th Border Regiment, the 172nd, the 175th and the 176th Infantry Regiments), the 74th Infantry Division (consisting of the 78th, the 109th and the 306th Infantry Regiments) commanded by General Fiodor Sherdin, and the 176th Infantry Division as part of the 404th and the 591st Regiments (commander - Major General Vladimir Martsinkevich) resisted in this area.

The German superiority in manpower, machinery and aviation was clear and Soviet troops were forced to retreat after bloody battles. On 2 December the offensive began in the Luhan River direction. At the same time, the Italian Division began to move towards Voroshilovgrad. The fiercest fighting lasted from 8–15 December. The Red Army inflicted heavy losses on the Germans. In the daily fight of 8 December 1941 at the station Borzhikovka units under the command of Martsinkevich killed 428 Germans (among them 3 officers), seized two 75 mm cannons, 1 mortar, 1 machine gun, 15 rifles, 7 submachine guns, 1 radio, 50 ammunition boxes (mortars), 5 ammunition boxes (cartridges), and a staff car with documents. During twenty-four hours on 10 December 1941, the Italian Division "Torino" by two regiments continually attacked positions of the 1st Motorized Infantry Battalion which repelled nine enemy attacks and made two counterattacks.

German troops sought at any price to complete the occupation of Donbas as fast as possible. Germany was in need of the biggest factories in the region, and its natural resources.

On December 15 after multiple air raids supported by attacks of fresh infantry and motorized units, Germany pressed the position of the 74th Infantry Division and fully occupied Debaltseve. However, some pockets of resistance in the city did not abate until 22 December when the soldiers of the 74th Division, the 95th NKVD Regiment and separate parts of the 71st Brigade burst in Debaltseve and captured the city. German troops suffered heavy losses; staff documents of the 117th Infantry Regiment were seized, as well as its banner, a war diary and record materials of personnel, and Iron Crosses meant for keeping up the fighting spirit of the German soldiers.

But the German Army could not accept the loss of an important railway junction and brought up fresh reserves. Therefore, from 23 December to 26 December they continuously attacked Soviet troops which failed to fortify its position in the city. The fighting went on day and night. Soviet soldiers were fiercely fighting for each stone building. Fierce fighting took place near the military camp in the area of the district called The First Platform. On 26 December Soviet soldiers of the 74th Infantry Division were ordered to leave the city. Together with fighters from the 71st Brigade they left Debaltseve, took up and strengthened defensive positions at a height of 326.6 m, near the Tolstova settlement. The 95th NKVD Regiment remained there until 1 March 1942.

The fighting on the front line which went across the eastern boundary of Debaltseve did not stop even at the beginning of January 1942. The 176th Infantry Division went into the offensive, and captured settlements Komisarivka and Oktyabrskiy. Again street battles, as well as sniper fire, broke out in the city. Again Soviet troops were forced to retreat, fortified their positions along the eastern boundary of the city on the already controlled heights of a forest ravine. Here, the front line was stabilized until the summer of 1942.

On 3 September 1943, Debaltseve was captured from German troops by Soviet units of the Southern Front as a part the Donbas operation.

=== Post-war period ===
During first “five-year plans” the railway station and mechanical factory underwent reconstruction. The factory started to produce foundry ladles, iron and slag carriages, gates for blast furnaces.

In the 1970s there were new multistorey microdistricts built, such as “Cheriomushki” (in the north-east of the city), “30th anniversary of the Victory” and "Eastern"; in the 1980s – the "Festival" microdistrict.

=== 21st century ===
See also articles War in Donbas and Battle of Debaltseve

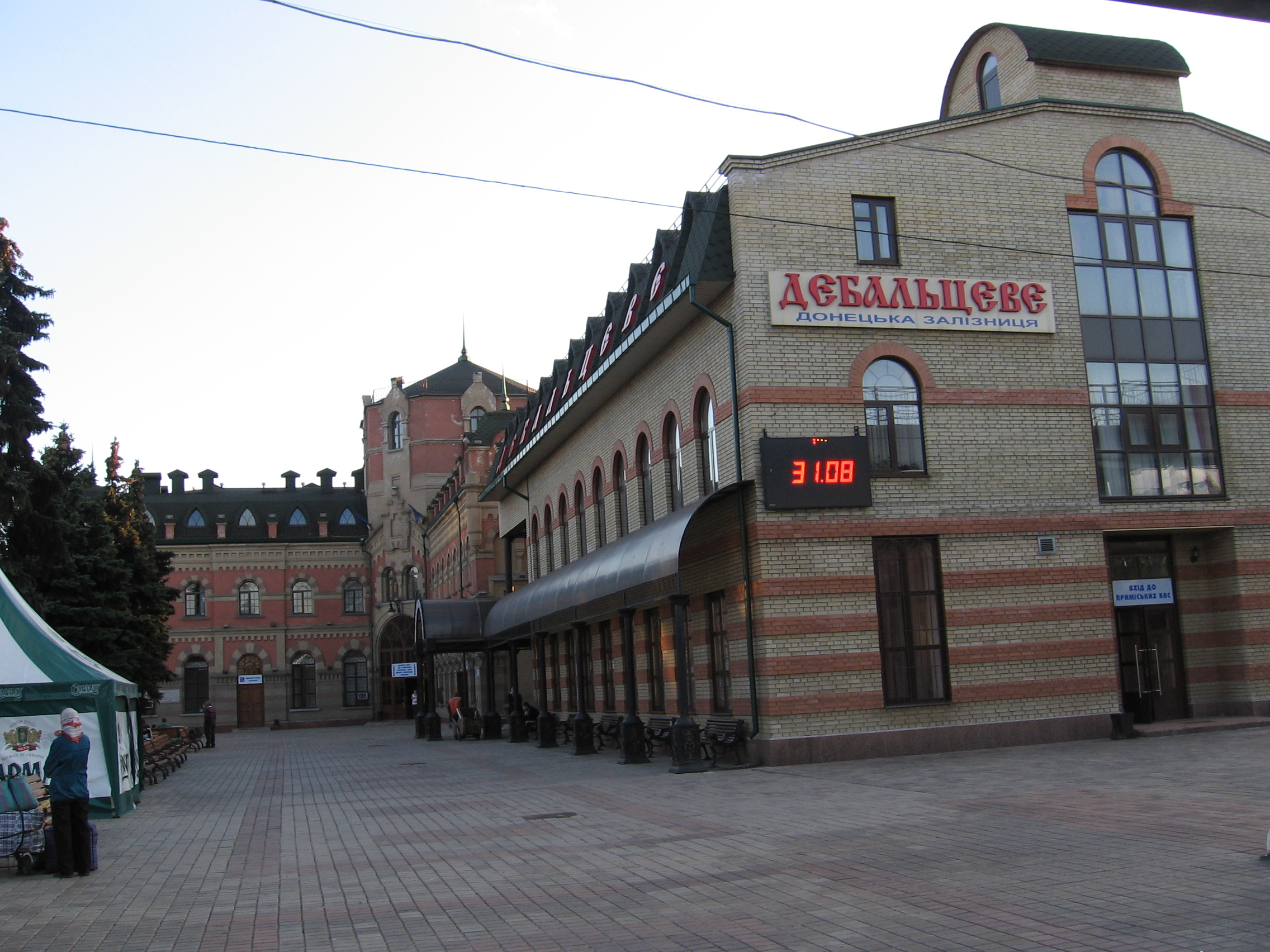
Debaltseve railway station in 2010

During the early stages of the war in Donbas, Debaltseve was the site of an important battleground between the Donetsk People's Republic and Ukraine. Fighting started on 24 July 2014, when the central market and a house were burned down due to fighting. The next day, DPR forces launched a counterattack against Ukrainian troops near the city. Ukrainian cities responded by shelling Debaltseve from the direction of Svitlodarsk. By 28 July, fighting was ongoing in the center of Debaltseve, although on 29 July Ukraine was able to hold the town.

Fighting restarted on 23 January 2015, when DPR forces launched an offensive towards the city, creating an encirclement called the "Debaltseve pocket." The city's supply of electricity, heating, and communications were severed during the battle and residents were forced to hide in shelters. Ukrainian forces began to evacuate civilians from the city by early February. On 16 February DPR and LPR forces launched an assault, capturing the city from Ukraine after two days of intense urban combat. At the beginning of 2015 the city was significantly destroyed during the fighting in this area. According to Mayor Alexander Afendikov, appointed by DPR authorities, 80% of the city was destroyed.

== Demographics ==
As of the Ukrainian Census of 2001:

Ethnicity

Ethnic groups in Debaltseve
	percent
Ukrainians	64.4%
Russians	32.6%
Belarusians	0.7%
Romani	0.3%

Language

First languages in Debaltseve
	percent
Russian	81.5%
Ukrainian	16.9%
Romani	0.3%
Belarusian	0.1%
others	0.2%

== Local sights ==
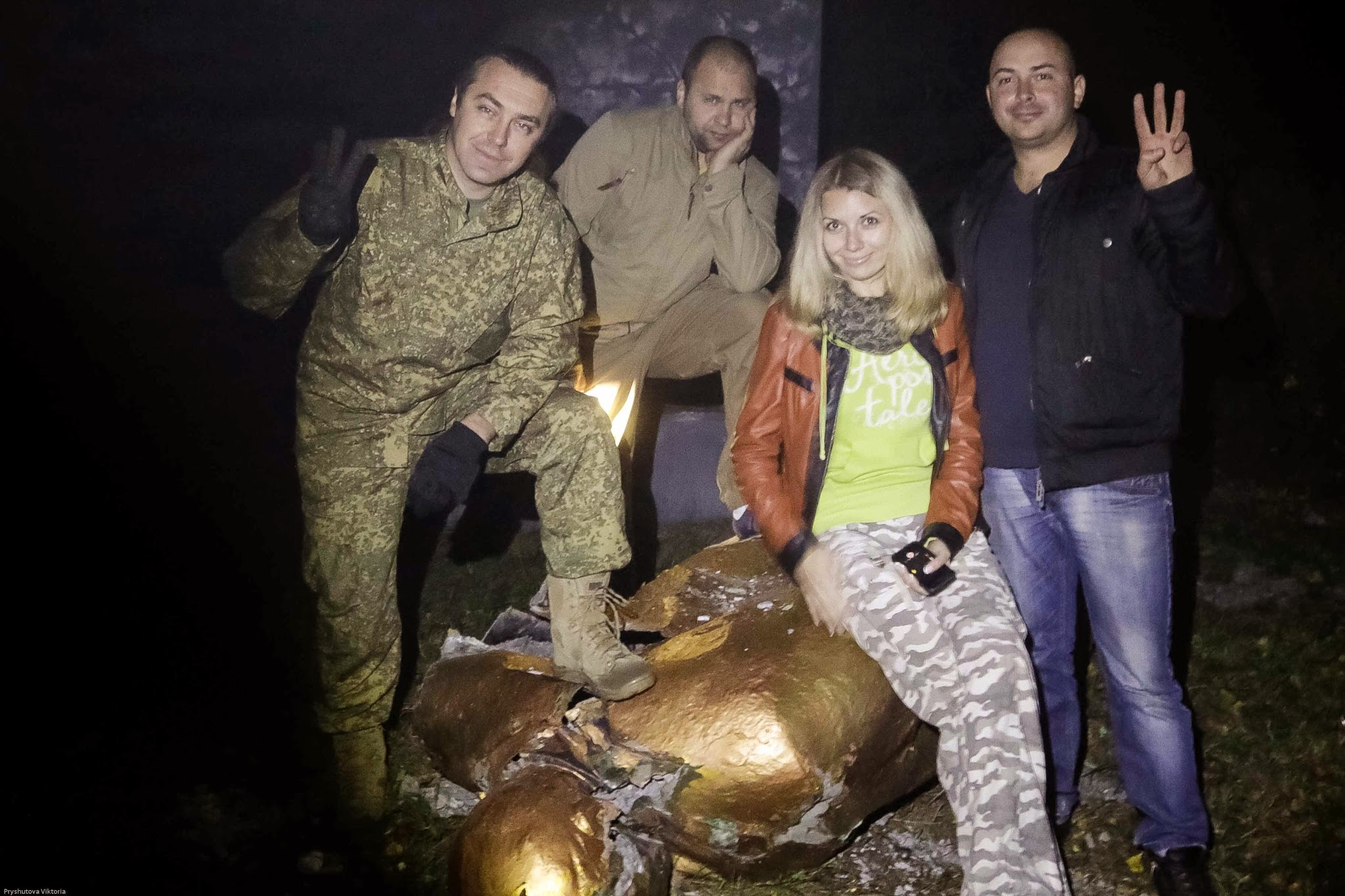
Dismantled Lenin monument in 2014

- Carriage depot: there are only two of them in Ukraine
- Carriage depot's House of Science and Engineering (Kalininska St)
- Railroad Workers’ Palace of Culture (Ukrainian: Палац культури залізничників, romanized: Palats kultury zaliznychnykiv, PKZ / DKZhD)
- Sports complex “Lokomotiv” (destroyed by the fighting in 2014)
- City Centre of Cultural Activities and Entertainment (Zavodska St)
- Club "Budivelnyk"/“Stroitel” (Kosmonavtiv St)
- Train station (architectural monument of the 19th century)
- Monument to soldiers-internationalists (Soviet soldiers in the Soviet-Afghan War, Radianska/Sovetskaya St)
- Monument to [Soviet] soldiers-liberators from Nazi occupiers (Central Square)
- Monument to heroes who died in Great Patriotic War (Zavodske/Zavodskoi district)
- Monument to Ludmila Mokievskaya-Zubok, heroine of the Civil War in 1918–1919, a Red Army commander of an armored train No. 3 “Power to the Soviets!”

== Public services ==
- 2 hospitals:
  - 465 beds,
  - 100 doctors,
  - 360 medical staff;
- 7 kindergartens;
- 7 schools;
- 2 palaces of culture:
  - Railroad Workers’ Palace of Culture
  - “40th anniversary of VLKSM” (socio-political youth organization in Soviet Union, usually known as Komsomol);
- A music school;
- 1 stadium;
- Sports palace “Lokomotiv” (destroyed);
- Sports complex “Mi”;
- Junior sports school;
- 20 libraries;
- Local history museum (since 1966);
- House of Pioneers;
- Young Technicians Club.

== Notable people ==
- Poet and writer Volodymyr Sosiura (another biography article here).
- Boris Shcherbina, Soviet minister who supervised liquidation of Chernobyl disaster.
