= Novohryhorivka, Horlivka Raion, Donetsk Oblast =

Novohryhorivka Новогригорівка
- Village
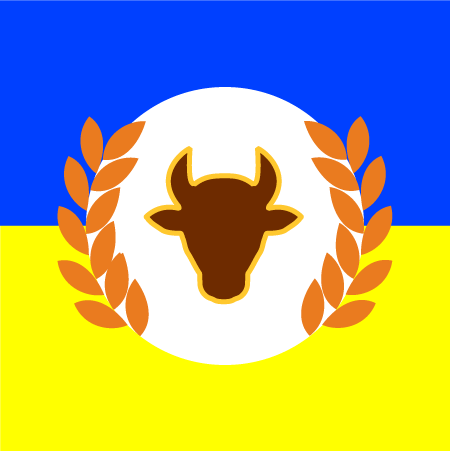
- Coat of arms

- Location of Novohryhorivka within Ukraine Novohryhorivka (Ukraine)
- Coordinates: 48.366389°N 38.411944°E
- Country: Ukraine
- Oblast: Donetsk Oblast
- District: Horlivka Raion
- Founded: 1886
- Elevation: 302 m (991 ft)

Population (2001 census)
  - Total: 475
- Time zone: UTC+2 (EET)
  - Summer (DST): UTC+3 (EEST)
- Postal code: 84582
- Area code: +380 6274

Novohryhorivka (Ukrainian: Новогригорівка; Russian: Новогригоровка) is a village in Horlivka Raion (district) in Donetsk Oblast of eastern Ukraine, at 61.9 km NE from the centre of Donetsk city, at 3 km NNE from Debaltseve.

== History ==
=== War in Donbas ===
During the Battle of Debaltseve in the beginning of 2015 some local residents were evacuated from the village and the settlement was taken under control of pro-Russian forces.

== Demographics ==
The settlement had 475 inhabitants in 2001, native language distribution as of the Ukrainian Census of 2001:

- Ukrainian: 87.58%
- Russian: 12.21%
- other languages: 0.21%
