= Adam Osmayev =

Chechen brigadier general

- ОсмагӀеран Адам
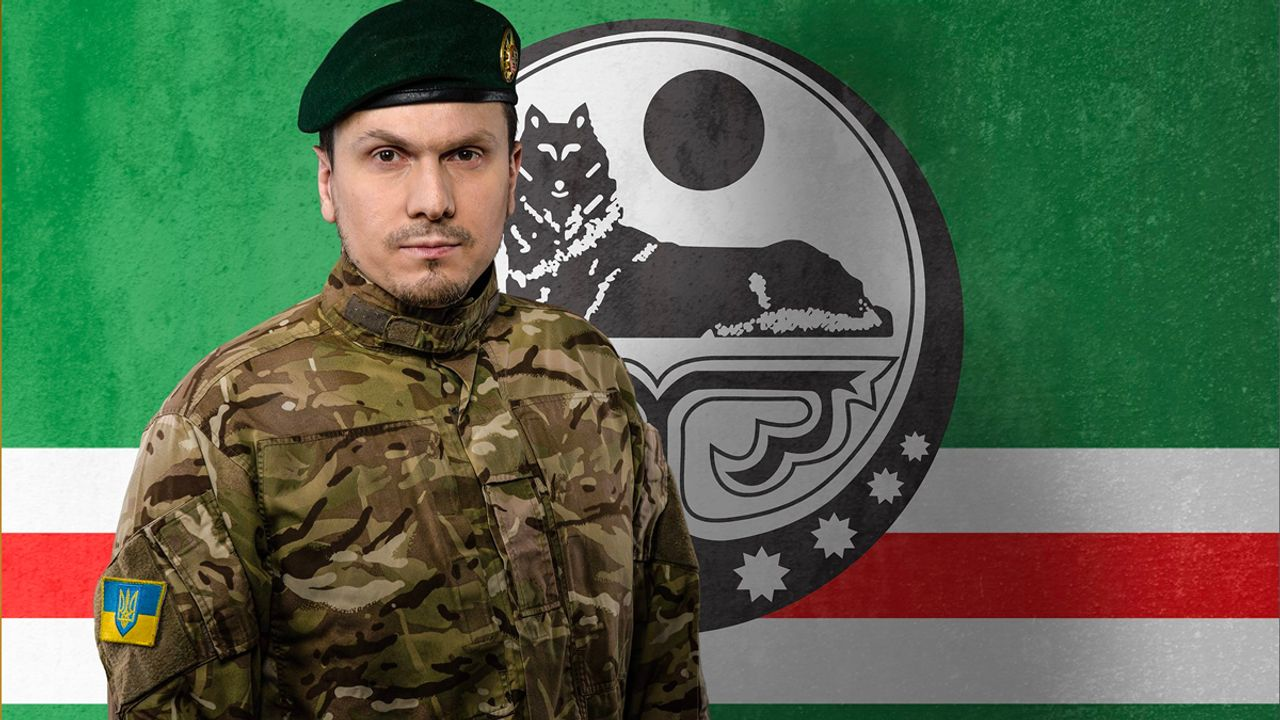
- Osmayev in 2022
- Born: 2 May 1981 (age 45) (Note: Also given as 2 May 1984 (age 42)); Grozny, Checheno-Ingush ASSR, Russian SFSR, Soviet Union (now Chechen Republic, Russia)
- Education: Moscow State Institute of International Relations
- Spouse: Amina Okueva (m. 2009; died 2017)
- Military career
- Allegiance: Chechen Republic of Ichkeria; Caucasus Emirate (alleged); Ukraine
- Branch: Armed Forces of the Chechen Republic of Ichkeria; Ukrainian Ground Forces
- Service years: c. 2015–present
- Rank: Brigadier general
- Unit: Dzhokhar Dudayev Battalion
- Commands: Dzhokhar Dudayev Battalion
- Conflicts: Russo-Ukrainian War; War in Donbas; Russian invasion of Ukraine

Adam Aslanbekovich Osmayev (Note: Chechen: ОсмагӀеран Адам, romanized: Osmağjeran Adam Russian: Адам Асланбекович Осмаев Ukrainian: Адам Асланбекович Осмаєв, romanized: Adam Aslanbekovych Osmaiev) (born 2 May 1981) is a Chechen brigadier general active in Ukraine. Born into a prominent Chechen family, Osmayev first acquired notability after being arrested in 2007 and accused of involvement in a plot to assassinate Chechen leader Ramzan Kadyrov. Released three days later, he fled to the United Kingdom and later settled in Ukraine. In 2012, he was further accused of masterminding an attempt to assassinate Russian President Vladimir Putin. Arrested on charges of carrying explosives and causing property damage, he was not extradited following a recommendation from the European Court of Human Rights which argued that he would face torture if returned to Russia. He was released from Ukrainian prison in 2014 and subsequently joined the Armed Forces of Ukraine, becoming commander of the Dzhokhar Dudayev Battalion in 2015.

Osmayev has been targeted in assassination attempts allegedly orchestrated by the Russian government on multiple occasions, most notably an October 2017 shooting that killed his wife Amina Okueva.

== Early life and career ==
Adam Aslanbekovich Osmayev was born on 2 May 1981 or 1984 to an influential Chechen family. His mother Layla was a housewife, while his father Aslanbek would later become a petroleum executive and ally of Akhmad Kadyrov's government. Adam's uncle Amin Osmayev was chairman of the pro-Russian Supreme Soviet of the Chechen Republic in 1995 and from 1996 to 1998, concurrently serving as a member of the Federation Council. In addition to Adam, his family had three children: two sons, Ramzan and Islam, and one daughter, Khava. Following his 2007 arrest, Amin Osmayev distanced himself from his nephew, claiming that he had "three brothers and seven sisters, each having around 50–60 children," and that he "barely remembered" him.

The Osmayev family left Chechnya for Moscow in 1996, where Adam studied at the Moscow State Institute of International Relations (MGIMO). According to Novaya Gazeta, his entrance to MGIMO was assisted by his uncle's political connections. He later studied economics at the University of Buckingham from 1999, but was allegedly expelled for poor academic performance the same year. According to a report by Kommersant, Osmayev studied under members of the Chechen diaspora at a mosque in the United Kingdom, where he was educated in explosives. Amin Osmayev later blamed Adam's stay in Britain for allegedly pushing him towards Wahhabism. He returned to Chechnya for a time before moving back to Moscow in 2005. During the Insurgency in the North Caucasus Osmayev allegedly led a cell of the Caucasus Emirate, but this has not been definitively proven.

== Arrest in Russia ==
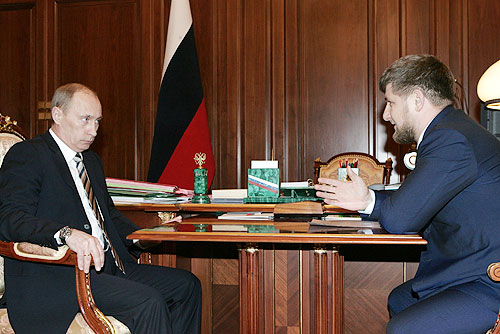
Ramzan Kadyrov (on right) was the target of an alleged terrorist plot, which Osmayev was arrested for his involvement in

Osmayev was arrested on 9 May 2007 by the Federal Security Service (FSB). Twenty kilograms of plastic explosives, twenty litres of gasoline, and two computers, with one containing metal balls, were found in a Lada Riva belonging to Osmayev. A rifle and a radiotelephone were also found in the vehicle. During the summer of 2007, he was accused by the FSB of participating in an assassination attempt on Chechen leader Ramzan Kadyrov. Besides Osmayev, three other Chechens were accused of involvement in the attack: Lorson Khamiyev, Ruslan Musayev, and Umar Batukayev. The plot's organiser was claimed by the FSB to be Chingiskhan Gishayev, an associate of Chechen jihadist leader Dokka Umarov. According to Kommersant, at the time of his arrest Osmayev was co-manager of a stock-trading company. Khamiyev had been arrested in Grozny some days before Osmayev's arrest, while Musayev and Batukayev were arrested earlier in the day.

Three days after his first arrest, Osmayev was released as a witness in the investigation. Novaya Gazeta claimed that his father had been responsible for his release. Afterwards, Osmayev fled Russia to the United Kingdom, and the Russian government issued both a national and international warrant for his arrest. The other participants in the alleged plot were all tried; Khamiyev was sentenced to eight years, Musayev to five years, and Batukayev was released. Osmayev's father later instructed him to settle in Ukraine.

== Arrest in Ukraine ==
Following his father's command to move to Ukraine, Osmayev lived in the southern city of Odesa and worked as a consultant at a stock-trading firm. He befriended fellow Chechen Ruslan Madayev and Kazakh Ilya Pyanzin, and was also allegedly contacted by representatives of Umarov while abroad. Madayev was killed on 4 January 2012 after an improvised explosive device he had made exploded in his hand. Pyanzin suffered burns as a result of the explosion, while Osmayev suffered minor injuries and fled. The cause of the explosion was originally thought to be a gas explosion, but after pieces of the device were discovered, the Security Service of Ukraine (SBU) joined the investigation.

As part of the SBU investigation, Osmayev's flat was searched. As part of the search, extremist literature, a map of Odesa, and photographs of the Odesa Musical Comedy Theatre and Odesa Sports Palace were found, leading investigators to believe that he was planning an attack on the photographed buildings. Some Ukrainian media, namely KP and Segodnya, alleged that the publicisation of the investigation was a prelude to the arrests of hired killers who planned an attack on an Odesa businessman.

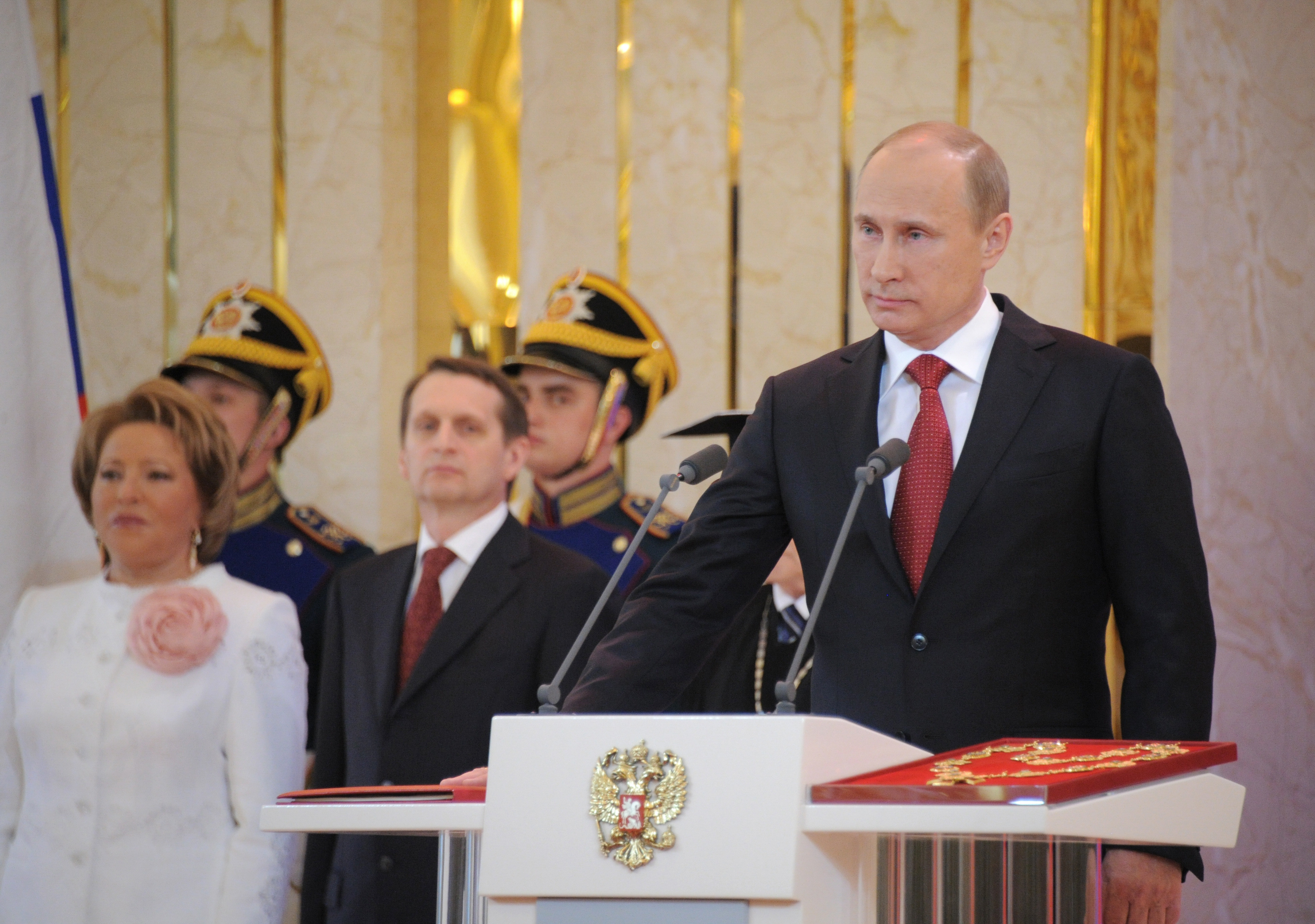
Osmayev was arrested in 2012 for an alleged plot to assassinate Vladimir Putin, then Prime Minister of Russia

Russian state-owned television channel Russia-1 said, citing Pyanzin's words to SBU investigators, that the three had been involved in a plan to kill then-Prime Minister of Russia Vladimir Putin due to his candidacy in the 2012 Russian presidential election. On 4 February 2012, Osmayev and his father were arrested by the SBU's Alpha Group and the FSB in a joint operation after the younger Osmayev had called a resident of Kabardino-Balkaria on his cell phone. Osmayev's father was charged with participation in "armed raids and preparations of terrorist attacks," but was released soon after investigators concluded he had simply been visiting his son at the time of the arrest. Dmitry Peskov, Putin's press secretary, said that the government was aware of the alleged assassination plot, but did not comment on it.

On 21 March 2012, both Osmayev and Pyanzin were placed on trial under Article 263 of the Criminal Code of Ukraine (illegal handling of weapons or explosives). Their trial was later transferred to Kyiv and placed under the Main Directorate of the SBU, and further charges of creating a terrorist organisation and performance of terrorist acts were levied against them. Investigators at the time alleged that Osmayev and Pyanzin were involved in an effort to assassinate Putin and other top Russian officials, recruit members of a broader terrorist network, and destabilise Russia. Both were also tried in absentia in Russia, where they were sentenced to twenty years imprisonment.

On 14 August 2012, the Odesa Oblast Court of Appeals proposed to extradite Osmayev and Pyanzin to Russia. The European Court of Human Rights intervened in the case to prevent the former's extradition, arguing that Osmayev faced a high risk of torture if he was extradited. Pyanzin's effort to avoid extradition, however, was not fulfilled, and he was transferred to Moscow on 24 August 2012, being found guilty and sentenced to ten years' imprisonment in 2013.

Following the Revolution of Dignity, in which pro-Russian President Viktor Yanukovych was overthrown, Osmayev's wife Amina Okueva appealed to the Verkhovna Rada (Ukrainian parliament), Prosecutor General of Ukraine, and SBU to recognise Osmayev as a political prisoner and release him from prison on 24 March 2014. On 18 November, he was found guilty of property damage, illegal handling of explosives, and illegally crossing the border by the Prymorskyi District Court of Odesa, which sentenced him to time served and allowed his release. The articles of terrorism or conspiring to assassinate Putin were not included, having been dropped a month earlier.

== Russo-Ukrainian War ==
Following his release, Osmayev joined the Armed Forces of Ukraine, and he was appointed as head of the Dzhokhar Dudayev Battalion following the death of the battalion's commander Isa Munayev at the Battle of Debaltseve.

=== 2017 assassination attempts ===
Osmayev was twice targeted in assassination attempts by suspected Russian government agents in 2017. A 1 June incident involved Russian national Artur Denisultanov-Kurmakayev, who shot at Osmayev while posing as Le Monde journalist Alex Werner, but was wounded by Okueva. In the second incident, dating to 30 October, Osmayev and Okueva were chased by another car while driving outside Kyiv. The car opened fire, killing Okueva and wounding Osmayev. Osmayev blamed the Russian government for both attacks.
