= Isa Munayev =

Chechen military commander (1965–2015)

- Iиса Мунаев (Chechen); Иса Мунаев (Russian); Іса Мунаєв (Ukrainian)
- Born: 20 May 1965; Yandi, Achkhoy-Martanovsky District, Chechen-Ingush ASSR, Russian SFSR, Soviet Union
- Died: 1 February 2015 (aged 49); Chornukhyne, Luhansk Oblast, Ukraine
- Military career
- Allegiance: Soviet Union; Chechen Republic of Ichkeria; Ukraine
- Service years: 1983–1985; 1991–2004; 2014–2015
- Rank: Brigadier general
- Commands: 1st Assault Battalion (named after Lemi Munayev); Grozny Garison; Dzhokhar Dudayev Battalion
- Conflicts: Soviet–Afghan War; First Chechen War; Second Chechen War; Battle of Grozny; Russo-Ukrainian War; War in Donbas; Battle of Debaltseve †
- Awards: People's Hero of Ukraine

Isa Akhyadovich Munayev (Chechen: Мунаев Ӏиса Ахьядович; Russian: Иса Ахьядович Мунаев; Ukrainian: Іса Ах'ядович Мунаєв; 20 May 1965 – 1 February 2015) was a Chechen rebel and military commander who fought for the independence of the Chechen Republic of Ichkeria from Russia until he was forced into exile in Europe around 2004. He was killed in action while leading a Chechen volunteer unit on the Ukrainian side during the war in Donbas in 2015.

== Biography ==
Munayev was a police officer in the city of Grozny before the outbreak of hostilities with Russia. At the beginning of the Second Chechen War in 1999, the Chechen leader, Aslan Maskhadov, appointed him as a military commandant of Grozny. During the Battle of Grozny (1999–2000), Munayev organized ambushes, car bombs and mine explosions against the Russian forces. In October 2000, the Russian authorities erroneously reported that he had been killed when a group of rebels tried to blow up a military truck. After the Chechen forces withdrew from the capital to the mountains, Munayev was made a brigadier general and commander of the Southwestern front early in 2001. Having sustained a serious injury during fighting, he was forced to leave Chechnya in 2004 or 2005. He was granted political asylum in Denmark, where he became the organizer of the public political movement "Free Caucasus", which was founded in 2009.

In July 2014, during the war in Donbas, the organization announced the formation of an "international peacekeeping battalion" of volunteers to support Ukraine in fighting against the pro-Russian insurgency. The battalion was named the Dzhokhar Dudayev Battalion after the first President of Chechnya, Dzhokhar Dudayev, and Munayev was appointed as its commander. During the armed conflict the Dudayev battalion operated between Donetsk and Luhansk with approximately 500 volunteers. The battalion was not subject to any political leader in Kyiv, or subordinate to any political structure there.

Munayev was killed in the Battle of Debaltseve on 1 February 2015. He was hit by shrapnel from a tank shell in the village of Chornukhyne, near Debaltseve. He had a large gaping wound and died instantly. He was 49 years old. He was buried in the Ukrainian city Dnipro in the Muslim section of the Krasnopil cemetery near the Dnieper.

After his death, British-educated Chechen national Adam Osmayev was chosen as the new leader of the Dzhokhar Dudayev Battalion, which had the aim to defend Debaltseve. Shortly afterward, Debaltseve was taken by separatist forces and a ceasefire came into effect.

== Legacy ==
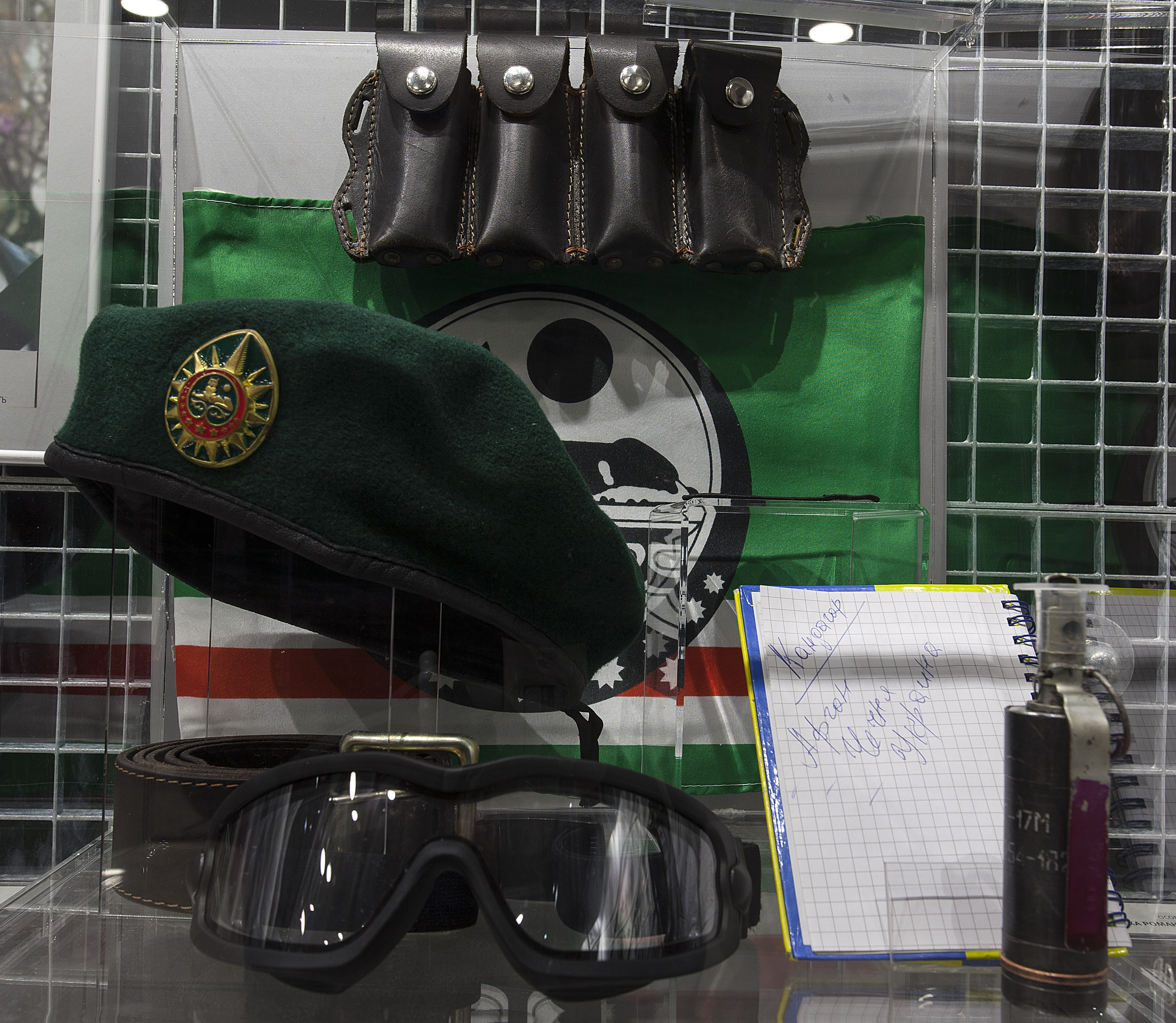
Memorial complex dedicated to Munaev in the museum "Civil feat of Dnipropetrovsk region in the events of the anti-terrorist operation", Dnipro, Ukraine

In the National Museum of the Armed Forces of Ukraine in the Central House of Officers a memorial stand dedicated the Hero of the war in Donbas and the commander of the "Dudayev Battalion" Isa Munayev, was opened.

A memorial complex dedicated to Munayev is presented in the hall of memory of the museum "Civil feat of Dnipropetrovsk region in the events of anti-terrorist operation" (Dnipro).

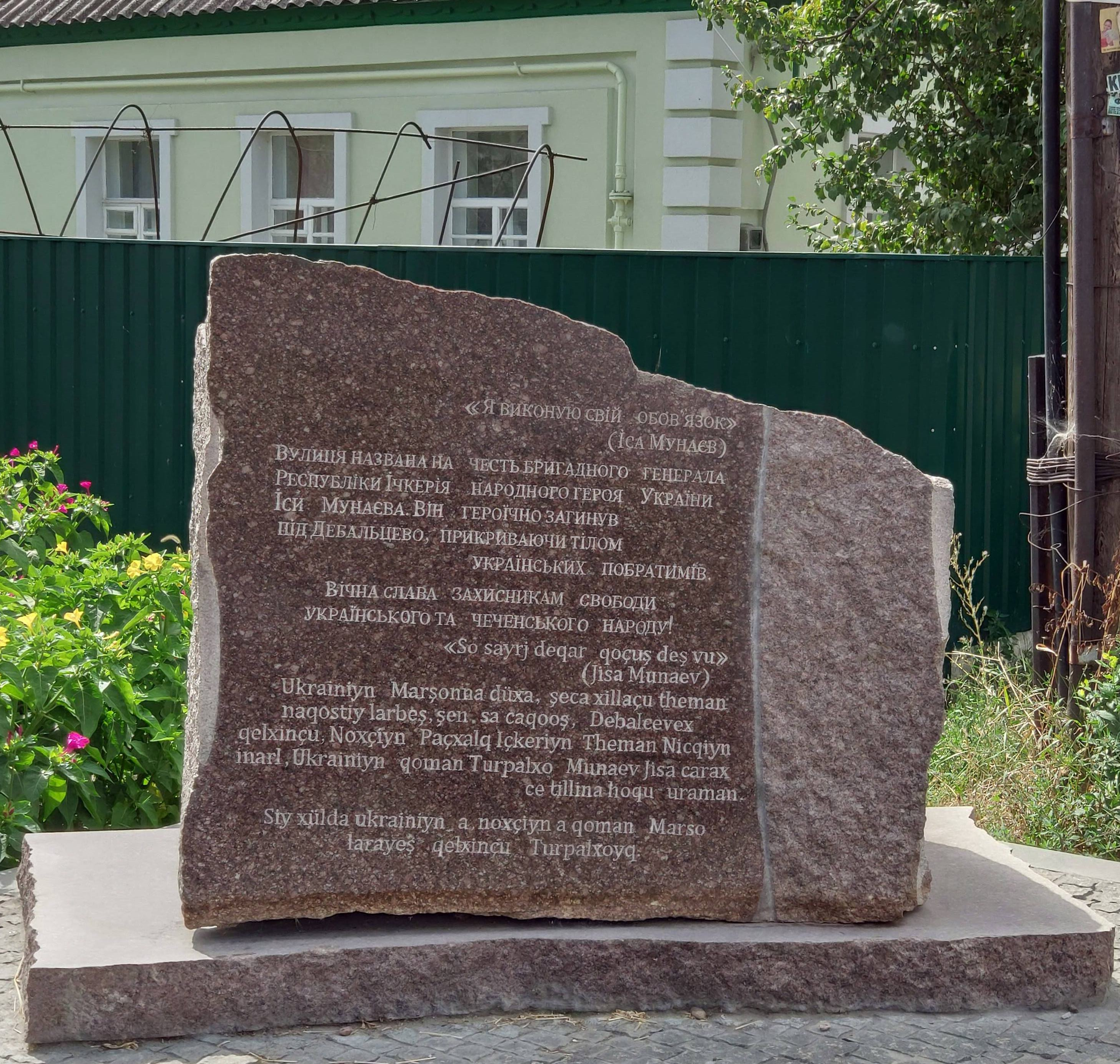
Memorial stone on Musa Munayev street in Dnipro, Ukraine

In 2018 one of the streets of Dnipro was renamed in honor of Munayev, later a street was named after Munayev in Kyiv too.
