= Battle of Debaltseve =

2015 battle in the Donbas war

Coordinates: 48.3799°N 38.3454°E

- Part of the War in Donbas during the Russo–Ukrainian War
- Map showing the encirclement and withdrawal of the Ukrainian forces from the city of Debaltseve and its surrounding areas
Date	14 January – 20 February 2015 (1 month and 4 days)
Location	Debaltseve, Donetsk Oblast, Ukraine
Result	DPR and LPR victory: Ukrainian forces retreat to the city of Artemivsk
Territorial changes	DPR and LPR forces capture Debaltseve, Vuhlehirsk, Lohvynove and four other villages

Belligerents
Ukraine	Donetsk People’s Republic; Luhansk People’s Republic; Russia (denied)

Commanders and leaders
Serhiy Shaptala; Oleksandr Syrskyi; Semen Semenchenko (WIA); Isa Munayev †; Adam Osmayev; Yevhen Yukhanov †; Dmytro Zahariya (WIA)	Alexander Zakharchenko (WIA); Aleksey Mozgovoy; Nikolay Kozitsyn

Units involved
Ukrainian Armed Forces: 57th Motorized Brigade; 40th "Kryvbas" Battalion; 30th Separate Mechanized Brigade; 95th Separate Airmobile Brigade; 3rd Special Operations Regiment; 8th Special Operations Regiment; 73rd Naval Special Operations Regiment; Ministry of the Internal Affairs: National Guard; 2nd Galician Brigade; 3rd Operational Brigade; 27th Pechersk Brigade; 45th Operational Regiment; Donbas Battalion; Ministry of Defense: Dzhokhar Dudayev Battalion	United Armed Forces of Novorossiya: Prizrak Brigade; Cossack National Guard; Kalmius Battalion; Oplot Battalion; Russian Armed Forces (denied by Russia): 8th Guards Motor Rifle Brigade; 18th Guards Motor Rifle Brigade; 25th Spetsnaz Regiment; 5th Separate Guards Tank Brigade; elements of the 232nd Multiple Rocket Launcher Brigade

Strength
2,500–5,000	15,000–17,000 (Ukrainian claim)

Casualties and losses
267 killed 112–121 captured^{[*]} 508–668 wounded (Ukrainian claim)	868 killed (Ukrainian claim); 58 killed (Separatist claim); 70 Russian soldiers killed (Russian opposition claim)
- 500+ civilians killed (Separatist claim)
- ^{*} 104 prisoners were released

The Battle of Debaltseve was a military confrontation in the city of Debaltseve, Donetsk Oblast, between the pro-Russian separatist forces of the Donetsk People's Republic (DPR) and Luhansk People's Republic (LPR), and the Ukrainian Armed Forces, starting in mid-January 2015 during the war in the Donbas region. The Russian forces composed mostly of "Wagner Group" soldiers recaptured Debaltseve, which had been under Ukrainian control since a counter-offensive by government forces in July 2014. The city lay in a "wedge" of Ukrainian-held territory bordered by the DPR on one side, and the LPR on the other, and was a vital road and railway junction.

Separatist and Russian forces began a concerted effort to force Ukrainian troops out of the city on 16–17 January, sparking the battle. Heavy fighting went on until 18 February 2015, when Ukrainian forces retreated from Debaltseve to Artemivsk (present-day Bakhmut).

It was the last major battle during the 2014–2015 phase of the war in Donbas, as the Minsk II ceasefire took effect on 15 February 2015, although fighting continued in Debaltseve for several days after.

== Background ==
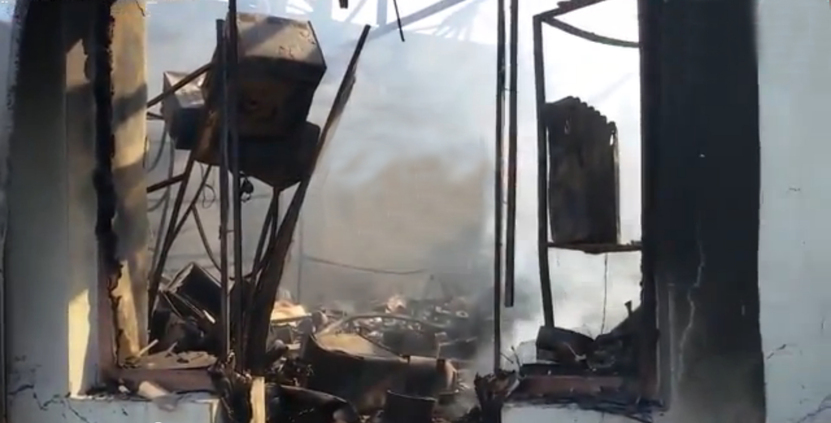
Damaged building July 25, 2014

Debaltseve came under the control of pro-Russian forces in April 2014. Ukrainian forces managed to recapture the city on 28 July 2014, and continued to hold on to it firmly until January 2015. On 12 August troops of the 25th Airborne Brigade and the National Guard of Ukraine were able to establish control over the nearby city of Vuhlehirsk. After the Minsk Protocol ceasefire agreement was signed on 5 September 2014, intermittent violations occurred around Debaltseve.

As the "LPR" and "DPR" forces commanded by Igor Girkin (who had FSB background) were largely formed of ex-soldiers and people with little military experience, they were losing to Ukrainian army counter-offensive. In response, Russian command made decision to send GRU military intelligence units to change balance of forces. Russian leadership insisted the fighting was done by "LPR/DPR militias" in spite of overwhelming evidence that Russian soldiers and weapons were transferred through the border from Russia. Only after the start of the full-scale war in 2022 and especially after death of Dmitry Utkin ("Wagner") in 2023, Russian media and obituaries started openly mentioning their military engagement in Donbas.

== Events ==
Thousands of Ukrainian troops dug in at Debaltseve in January 2015. The city is a vital railway and road junction, and was sandwiched between DPR and LPR territories as a "pocket" or "wedge" of Ukrainian territory - a 15-mile salient into separatist-controlled territory. Most residents had left by this time, with shops closed, schools abandoned, and houses damaged. Intermittent shelling of the city was common in the months preceding the January 2015 escalation. Heavy shelling, however, began on 17 January, and continued through 20 January.

Russian forces attacked Ukrainian positions in the area around Debaltseve on 22 January. Heavy shelling continued into the next day, while Ukrainian forces continued to hold their positions in the city. An empty school building was hit by a shell during the fighting. In retaliation, Ukrainian forces began an artillery barrage on separatist positions outside the city. On the following day, the DPR vowed to retake Debaltseve, which was surrounded by DPR and LPR-controlled territory on three sides. According to a report on 24 January, a Ukrainian checkpoint near the city came under direct attack by Russian forces. Russian forces attacked another Ukrainian checkpoint near Debaltseve on 25 January, but the attack was repelled. On the next day, such attacks continued, with heavy fighting taking place all around Debaltseve. A resident of the city told Reuters that Debaltseve had been almost completely surrounded by Russian forces, but that Ukrainian forces had managed to hold on despite constant attacks.

=== Separatist advance ===
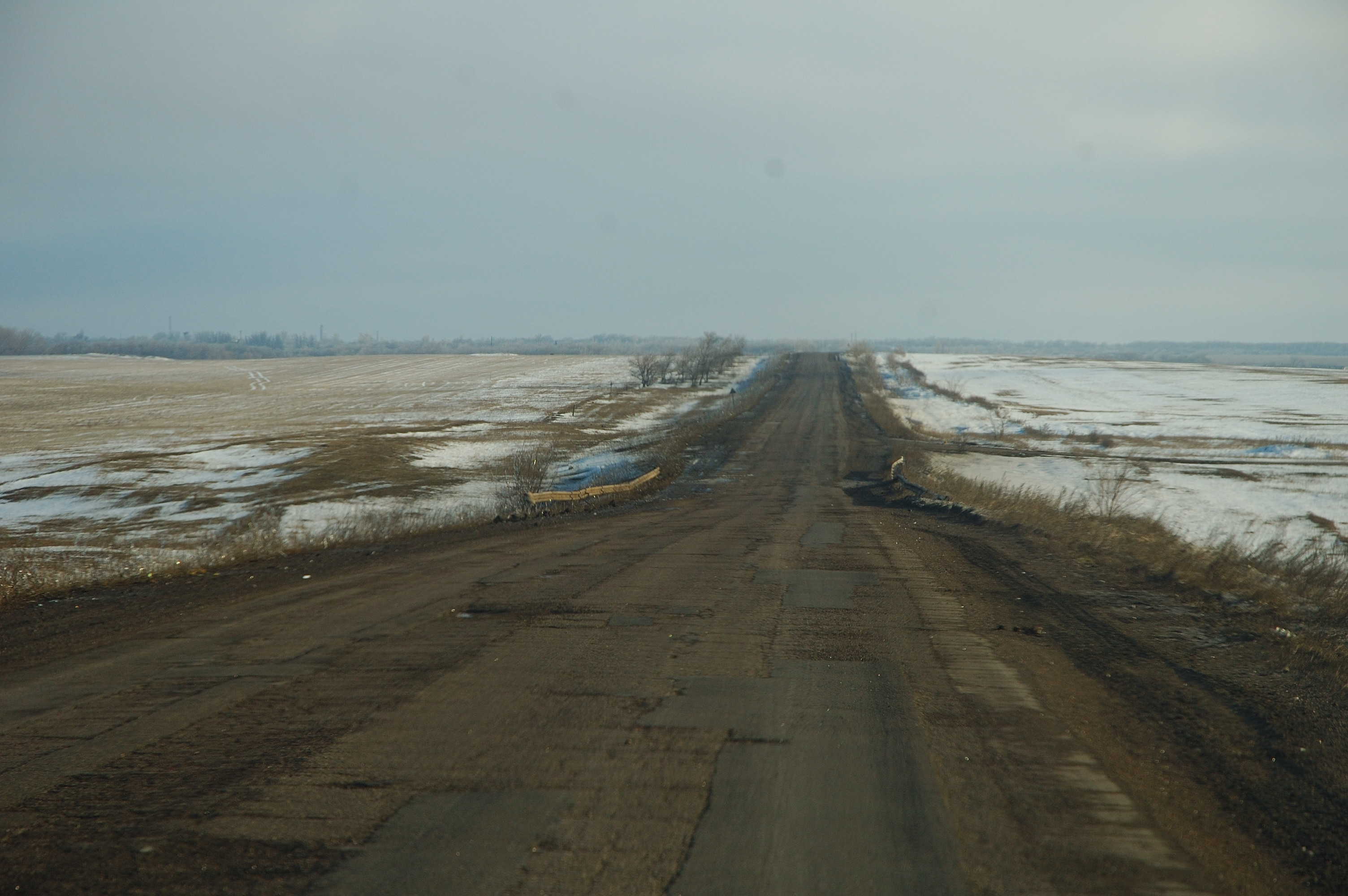
The Debaltseve to Bakhmut highway, surrounded by open steppe.

Russian forces attempted to enter Debaltseve on 27 January, this time from the direction of Horlivka, but were repelled. On the following day, a DPR commander said that his forces had captured the highway that leads into the city, and that the city had been nearly completely surrounded. However, Ukrainian member of parliament Dmytro Tymchuk said that separatist forces had been forced to "scale back" their offensive in the Debaltseve area. According to him, an artillery counterattack by government forces had caused heavy losses amongst separatists that had been trying to cut off Ukrainian troops from Ukrainian-controlled territory. BBC News released a video that showed Russian forces caught in this shelling. Despite this, on 29 January separatists captured Vuhlehirsk, a town 13 kilometres (8 mi) west of Debaltseve on the highway to DPR-controlled Horlivka. The separatists broke through Ukrainian lines, overran a government checkpoint, entered the town, and then proceeded into its centre. Reinforcements were sent to aid government soldiers in Vuhlehirsk. According to an Associated Press report, the loss of this town made it much more difficult for Ukrainian forces to hold onto Debaltseve. Meanwhile, three civilians in Debaltseve proper were killed by what government forces described as "continuous" shelling by the Russian forces.

During the day on 30 January, shells hit a bus, and also a cultural centre in Kyibishevskiy district that was being used to distribute humanitarian aid. According to the BBC, many civilians became trapped along with Ukrainian troops in the city. Some escaped to Bakhmut, in Ukrainian-controlled territory at the entrance to Debaltseve pocket. A report by Russian television channel Vesti said that around 8,000 Ukrainian troops remained in Debaltseve, and that Russian forces were close to closing the pocket's entrance. Ukrainian territorial defence battalion commander Semen Semenchenko said that some Ukrainian soldiers continued to hold out in Vuhlehirsk, despite the fact that it was largely under DPR control. Spokesman for the National Security and Defence Council of Ukraine (NSDC) Andriy Lysenko said that reinforcements had arrived to relieve Ukrainian troops at Vuhlehirsk, and that the front line was holding. Over the course of the day, Ukrainian supply lines were nearly cut off, as Grad rocket fire made it difficult for armoured personnel carriers and lorries to travel on the 50-kilometre (31 mi) north–south highway between Bakhmut and Debaltseve. At least seven civilians were killed when a Grad rocket struck a block of flats in the city. The remaining residents of Debaltseve began to attempt to evacuate from the city amidst increasing fighting. Three buses per day were arranged to take people out of conflict zone to Bakhmut.

=== Closing the "kettle" ===
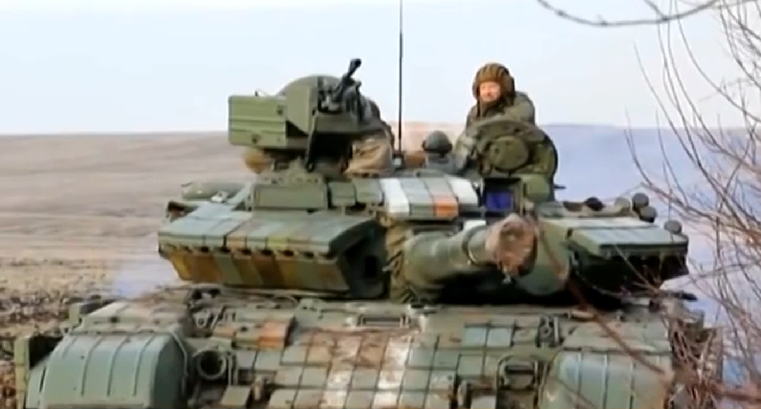
Ukrainian T-64BV tank in the Debaltseve area

Twelve more civilians were killed by DPR shelling in Debaltseve on 31 January. Government forces continued to use artillery fire to cut off DPR reinforcements from entering Vuhlehirsk. A ground offensive to dislodge separatists from that town failed, resulting in the deaths of three members of the Donbas Battalion, and injuring battalion commander Semenchenko. Evacuation of civilians from Debaltseve continued amid harsh winter conditions. As of that day, the city had been without water, gas, or electricity for at least ten days. According to Ukrainian prime minister Arseniy Yatsenyuk, at least 1,000 people had been evacuated from Debaltseve by 31 January. Ukrainian defence minister Stepan Poltorak confirmed that part of Debaltseve was under DPR control.

On the first day of February, the situation in Debaltseve rapidly deteriorated. According to the Kyiv Post, some units of the National Guard of Ukraine had been forced to flee as Russian forces pushed into the outskirts of the city. The situation in Debaltseve continued to worsen into 2 February. The New York Times reported that it appeared that the separatists could seize the Bakhmut highway "at any moment". The road had become nearly impassable, with multiple refugee-laden buses having been hit by artillery fire. Referring to the pocket of Ukrainian-held territory around Debaltseve as a "kettle", as became common, DPR leader Alexander Zakharchenko said that anyone that attempted to leave "the kettle" would be in the "interlocking field of fire of our artillery". A report by aid workers in the combat zone said that 8,000 residents had escaped from the Debaltseve area by 2 February. One aid worker said that pro-Russian forces were deliberately targeting the buses being used to transport residents out of the city. An observer with Amnesty International said that the humanitarian situation in Debaltseve had become "catastrophic". In order to assist the remaining Ukrainian troops in Debaltseve, the Armed Forces sent a large column of reinforcements, including armoured vehicles and troop transports, from their base of operations at Kramatorsk to besieged Debaltseve.

Map showing the Debaltseve operation

A ceasefire between Russian and Ukrainian forces was agreed to for the day of 3 February. The stated intent was to allow remaining civilians to escape from the Debaltseve area. Shelling lessened until 13:00 EET, when salvos of Grad rockets were fired towards Debaltseve. Fighting continued into the next day. One resident of Debaltseve who had fled to Bakhmut said that there was "nothing left" in the city. Russian forces gained control of Vuhlehirsk on 4 February, allowing the separatists to increase shelling of the Bakhmut highway and Debaltseve. DPR and Ukrainian forces agreed to establish a humanitarian corridor on 6 February, in another attempt to allow the remaining civilians to escape from Debaltseve. Hundreds of civilians were able to flee. Fighting resumed on 7 February. Russian forces said that they had fully encircled the town by capturing the village of Lohvynove on 9 February, thus "closing the kettle". Only four Ukrainian soldiers had been stationed in the village at the time, allowing the separatists to capture it easily. Government forces said that fighting was still ongoing on the Bakhmut highway, and that the kettle had not been completely closed. By the morning of 10 February, it became clear that separatist forces had gained control of the Bakhmut highway, thereby cutting off government forces. Videos showed DPR militants and tanks moving along the highway. During the day, the Lviv police chief was wounded in an explosion on a road near the town. Ukrainian forces took heavy casualties from artillery fire into 11 February. Nineteen soldiers were killed and seventy-eight injured in twenty-four hours. Those that died had been fighting near Hostra Mohyla hill, close to Debaltseve. In addition, Russian forces assaulted the Debaltseve police headquarters, killing the city's chief of police.

=== After Minsk II ===
Despite the signing of a new ceasefire agreement on 12 February 2015, fighting intensified around Debaltseve. Russian forces attempted an offensive on Debaltseve proper in an effort to push out government troops before the start of the ceasefire, which was to come into effect at 0:00 EET on 15 February 2015. Heavy artillery barrages were reported to have struck the city, and the strategic Bakhmut highway was under intense shelling. Government troops made an attempt to recapture Lohvynove, but were ambushed by Russian groups. One Ukrainian soldier described the situation in the village as a "meat grinder" that was "worse than even those in Donetsk and Luhansk airports". At least 96 Ukrainian soldiers were wounded, whilst the number of dead was unknown because Ukrainian forces were forced to escape before they could remove the bodies of their comrades. Fighting continued along the Bakhmut highway into 14 February, as DPR insurgents continued their attempt to eliminate Ukrainian resistance. Donetsk regional chief of police Vyacheslav Abroskin said that intense shelling was "destroying Debaltseve". United States Department of State spokeswoman Jen Psaki said that the Russian Armed Forces had deployed "a large amount of artillery and multiple rocket launcher systems around Debaltseve", and that Russia was responsible for shelling of the city. A report by The New York Times said that the Bakhmut highway had become completely impassable by 12 February, and that no one had travelled on it since that day. It also said that the road had been laced with land mines. Ukrainian president Petro Poroshenko ordered his forces to observe the ceasefire as it came into effect at 0:00 EET on 15 February, and insurgent commanders did the same. Though fighting ceased across most of the combat zone, it continued at Debaltseve. DPR leader Alexander Zakharchenko said that Minsk II did not apply to Debaltseve, as it was not mentioned in the agreement. One Ukrainian soldier who was stationed at a checkpoint in the village of Luhanske, to the north of Debaltseve, said that there was "no ceasefire". During the course of 15 February, shelling struck Ukrainian positions, and separatist forces made multiple attacks upon the city from the west and east, storming government positions in the nearby village of Chornukhyne. Nevertheless, shelling in the area was less severe than it had been in the days prior to the start of the ceasefire. OSCE monitors, meant to observe the implementation of Minsk II, were denied access to Debaltseve by the separatist authorities.

Fighting further intensified into 16 February, with "non-stop explosions" striking the city. Early in the day, the Debaltseve police station was destroyed by separatist shelling. Kryvbas Battalion deputy commander Yuriy Sinkovskiy said that Ukrainian soldiers in Debaltseve were either completely or partially surrounded, and that there was no available communication link to the Ukrainian General Staff. Soldiers subsisted in freezing conditions and had little food or ammunition. Sinkovskiy said that he risked being court-martialed for disclosing this information, and that he simply wanted to save the men that were trapped in Debaltseve. He said that the troops should withdraw or even surrender if it would save their lives. DPR commander Eduard Basurin said that he would provide a corridor to allow Ukrainian troops to lay down their weapons and leave Debaltseve. Armed Forces spokesman Vladislav Seleznyov said that this was unacceptable, and that Debaltseve was Ukrainian territory according to the Minsk agreements. Reuters described the ceasefire as "stillborn" in Debaltseve. One member of the Donbas Battalion said that the situation for Ukrainian soldiers in the city was dire, and resembled the "Ilovaisk kettle", but on a much larger scale.

Separatist forces pushed into Debaltseve proper on 17 February. For the first time, fighting took place in the streets of the city. Separatist authorities said that they had captured the city's railway station, and also its eastern outskirts. The NSDC spokesman denied this, and said that fighting was ongoing throughout Debaltseve. Following this, the separatists said that they had captured most of the city, and were conducting a "mopping-up operation". They said they had taken at least 300 Ukrainian soldiers prisoner. A statement issued by the Ukrainian Defence Ministry confirmed that part of the city had fallen to "bandits", and that some soldiers had been taken prisoner. Ukrainian soldiers in the village of Komuna, just west of Debaltseve, told reporters that they could maintain their positions only for twelve more hours or they would be overrun and killed by Russian forces. Concurrently, a spokesman for the Ukrainian military operation in Donbas said that Lohvynove and the Bakhmut highway had been returned to Ukrainian control.

=== Ukrainian retreat ===
Ukrainian forces began to withdraw from Debaltseve in the early morning on 18 February. Prior to the withdrawal, about 6,000 soldiers had been holed up in the city. Preparations for the retreat had been going on in secret for days prior. According to The New York Times, the leadership of the Ukrainian military operation had spent much time attempting to find a road to escape on, as the Bakhmut highway had become impassable. The situation in Debaltseve had become untenable for Ukrainian troops positioned there. One soldier said that if Ukrainian forces had stayed in the city, "it would definitely be either captivity or death". In order to find a usable route out of Debaltseve, ambulances were sent through "farmers' fields and down back roads", ensuring that such movements would not attract the notice of the separatists. Having selected a route north to the Ukrainian-controlled village of Luhanske, the withdrawal plan was put into action. Troop transports queued on the edge of Debaltseve at 01:00 EET. Soldiers were told to prepare to leave in ten minutes with no prior notice, and then to load into the prepared lorries. They abandoned their heavy weaponry, and destroyed their ammunition so as to prevent it from falling into separatist hands. After loading, the column of about 2,000 men, including tanks and other armoured vehicles, began to proceed away from the city. Headlamps were kept off to avoid attracting the separatist attention. In spite of these preparations, the convoy was swiftly attacked by the separatist forces. Vehicles broke down and crashed, with fire raining down on the convoy from all sides. One soldier said that the separatists were "shooting with tanks, rocket-propelled grenades and sniper rifles", and that the column had been "disintegrated". Many soldiers were forced to abandon their vehicles and proceed on foot. Dead and wounded soldiers were left behind, as it was impossible to evacuate them. The withdrawal was complicated by the fact that government forces had not gained control of Lohvynove, as had been claimed a day earlier. Donbas Battalion commander Semen Semenchenko said "All the fairytales about Lohvynove turned out to be fairytales". Streams of ragged Ukrainian soldiers who had left Debaltseve arrived in Luhanske as the day went on. The New York Times said that Ukrainian forces had suffered "major losses, both in equipment and human life". Debaltseve fell silent by 15:00 EET. The flag of Novorossiya was raised over a former Ukrainian base of operations. Separatist authorities said that they had taken hundreds of Ukrainian troops captive. Ukrainian officials told AFP that during the evacuation "Full-scale street fighting continues and there was also a small tank battle."

Ukrainian president Petro Poroshenko said that the withdrawal had been "planned and organised", and that this orderly withdrawal proved that Debaltseve had been under Ukrainian control, and that "there was no encirclement". Soldiers on the ground, however, disputed President Poroshenko's account. Some soldiers said that "they had actually been told to stay put", and that they had been "left to die in a trap". They said that the Ukrainian government and media repeated "lies" about the status of Debaltseve, and that Ukrainian forces had been surrounded for more than a week. First Lt. Yuriy Prekharia, who had previously survived the encirclement of Ukrainian forces at Ilovaisk, said that Chief of the General Staff Viktor Muzhenko had repeated the same mistake, allowing Ukrainian forces to be trapped without support. He said that "The commanders should have given the order to break through and retreat as soon as the threat of encirclement became obvious". Commander Semenchenko likewise said: "The problem was with the leadership and coordination of actions … What’s going on now is the result of incompetent management of our troops, even though they’re trying to cover this up with a propaganda storm". President Poroshenko said that about 2,500 men had withdrawn from Debaltseve by the end of the day on 18 February, and this number represented 80% of the Ukrainian troops that had been in the city. Official reports said that thirteen soldiers had died during the retreat, and that 157 had been wounded. As above, soldiers on the ground disputed these numbers as grossly inaccurate, and said that the number of dead was "clearly in the hundreds". Two weeks later, the official casualty toll during the retreat was put at 19 dead, 12 missing, 9 captured and 135 wounded. Ukrainian government sources, on the other hand, reported that 185 soldiers had died during the battle, 112 had been taken prisoner, and 81 were missing. The Ukrainian death toll was later updated to 267 dead, after the bodies of many of the missing were found. Separatist leaders also said that their forces had captured a significant amount of Ukrainian heavy weaponry that had been left behind during the retreat.

Some soldiers remained trapped in Debaltseve on 19 February, but soldiers that previously escaped said that they were forbidden from rescuing their trapped comrades. Separatist forces removed the last pockets of Ukrainian resistance in the Debaltseve area on 20 February, when they captured the villages of Chornukhyne, Ridkodub, Nikishyne and Mius. According to a 27 February report by the United Nations Office for the Coordination of Humanitarian Affairs (OCHA), DPR authorities found 500 civilian corpses in houses and cellars in Debaltseve after the battle. Nearly all of the buildings in the city centre were either heavily damaged or destroyed by the fighting.

== Gallery ==
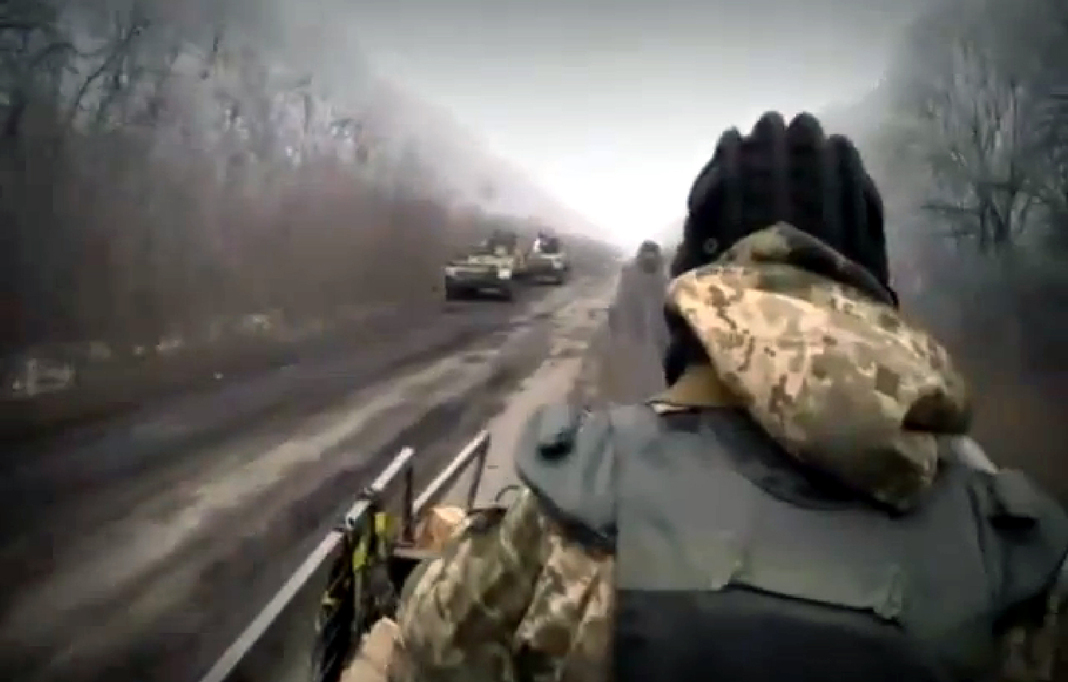
Ukrainian forces near Debaltseve

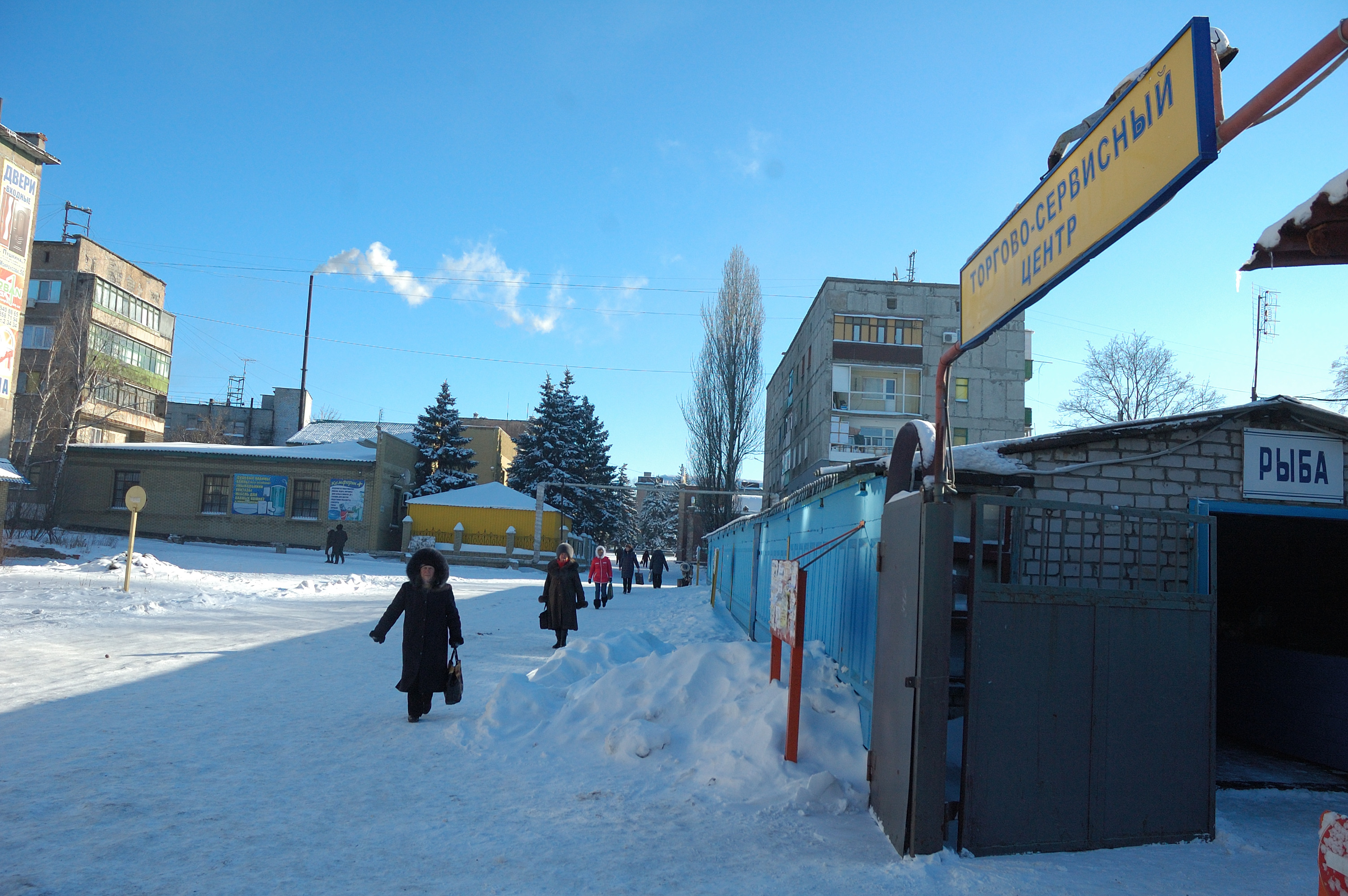
Residents in Debaltseve in early January 2015, prior to the start of the battle

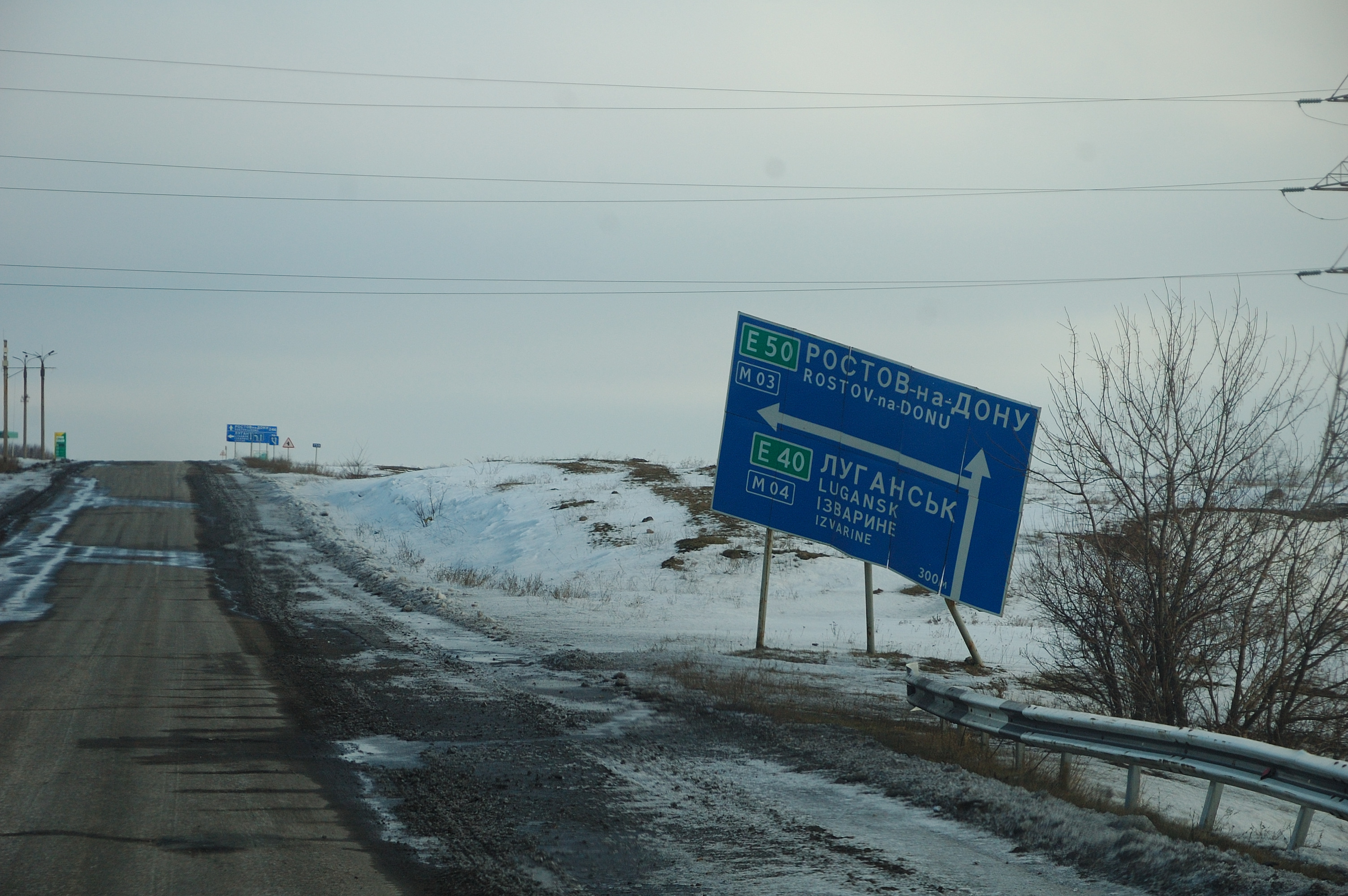
A sign that depicts the important road junction in Debaltseve. The M04 highway connects Izvaryne border crossing with Luhansk and Donetsk cities.

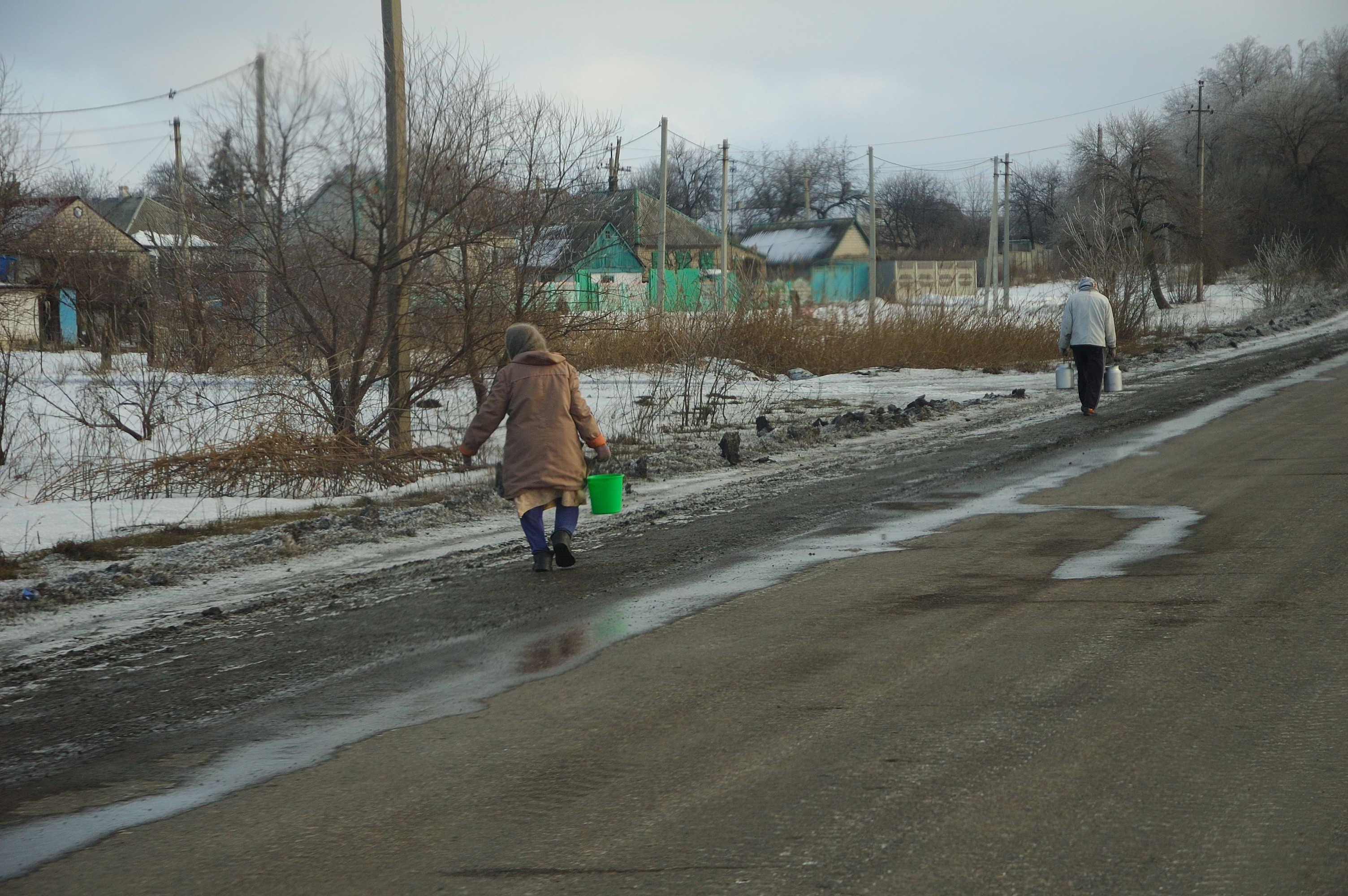
Residents carrying water following the start of the battle in late January 2015

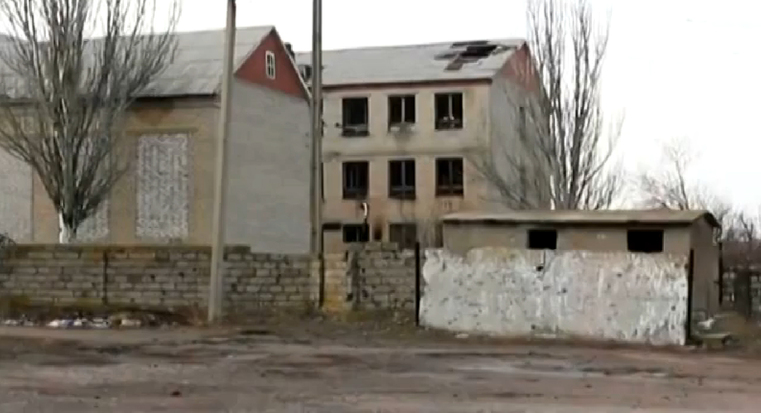
Debaltseve on 5 February

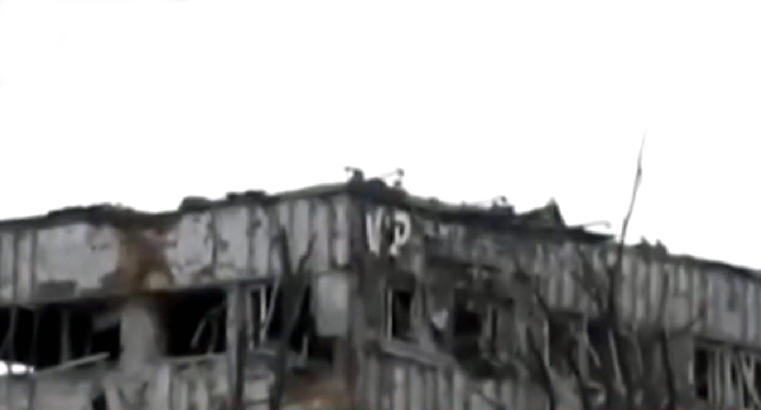
A destroyed building in Debaltseve

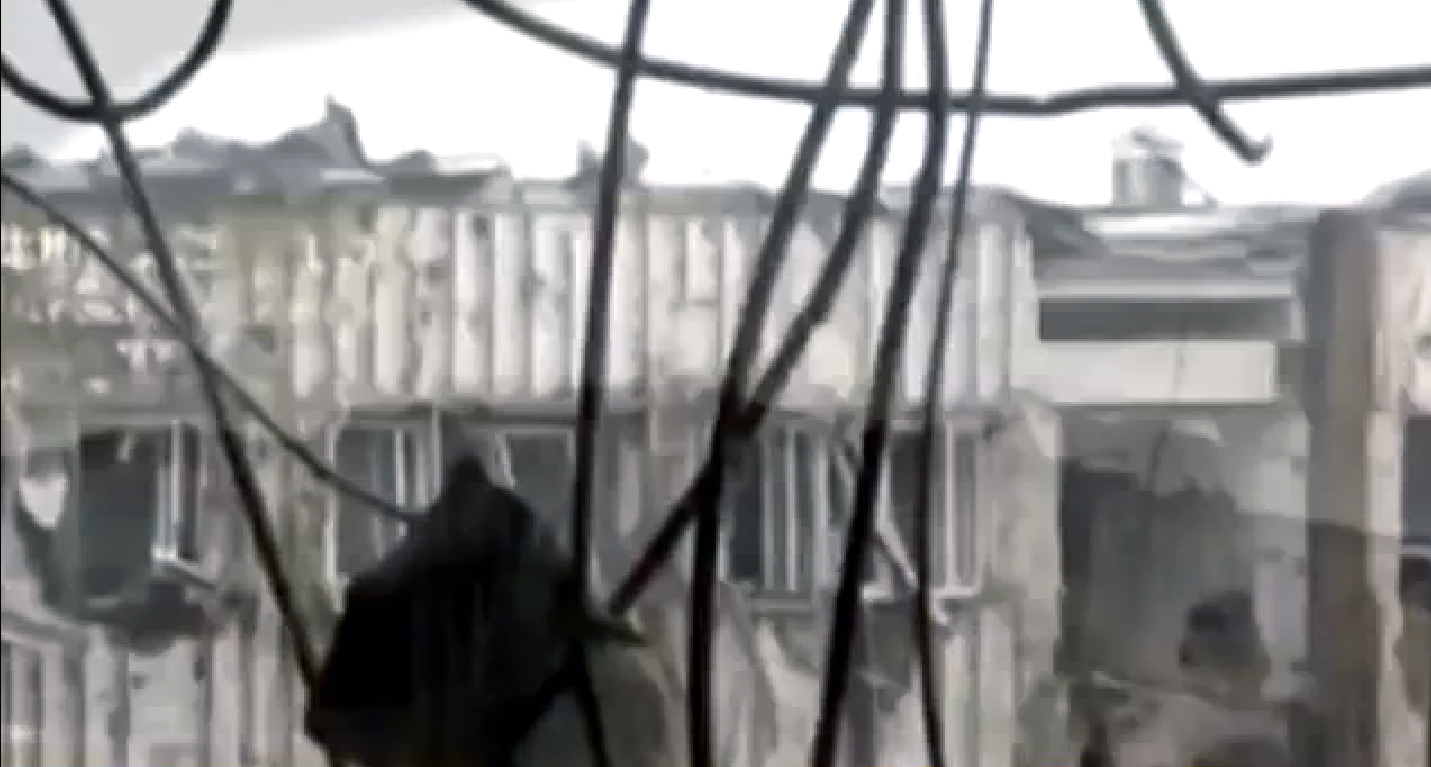
Civilian damage in Debaltseve

== See also ==
- Outline of the Russo-Ukrainian War
