= Sanzharivka =

Sanzharivka Санжарівка
- Village
- Location of Sanzharivka within Ukraine Sanzharivka (Ukraine)
- Coordinates: 48.436667°N 38.424444°E
- Country: Ukraine
- Oblast: Donetsk Oblast
- District: Horlivka Raion
- Elevation: 238 m (781 ft)

Population (2001 census)
  - Total: 8
- Time zone: UTC+2 (EET)
  - Summer (DST): UTC+3 (EEST)
- Postal code: 84582
- Area code: +380 6274

Sanzharivka (Ukrainian: Санжарівка; Russian: Санжаровка) is a village in Horlivka Raion (district) in Donetsk Oblast of eastern Ukraine, at 67.1 km NE from the centre of Donetsk city, at about 10.9. km NNE from the centre of Debaltseve.

== History ==
The settlement was taken under control of pro-Russian forces during the War in Donbass, that started in 2014.

== Demographics ==
The settlement had 8 inhabitants in 2001; native language distribution as of the Ukrainian Census of 2001:

- Ukrainian: 100.00%
