= Kalynivka, Horlivka Raion, Donetsk Oblast =

Kalynivka Калинівка
- Village
- Location of Kalynivka within Ukraine Kalynivka (Ukraine)
- Coordinates: 48°20′43″N 38°18′31″E
- Country: Ukraine
- Oblast: Donetsk Oblast
- Raion: Horlivka Raion
- Hromada: Debaltseve urban hromada
- Founded: 1753
- Elevation: 198 m (650 ft)

Population (2001 census)
  - Total: 112
- Time zone: UTC+2 (EET)
  - Summer (DST): UTC+3 (EEST)
- Postal code: 84583
- Area code: +380 6274

Kalynivka (Ukrainian: Калинівка; Russian: Калиновка) is a village in Horlivka Raion (district) in Donetsk Oblast of eastern Ukraine, at 54.5 km NE from the centre of Donetsk city.

The village was taken under control of pro-Russian forces during the War in Donbass, that started in 2014. Ukrainian forces took the village under their control in December 2016.

== Demographics ==
Native language as of the Ukrainian Census of 2001:

- Ukrainian — 59.82%
- Russian 40.18%
