= Nyzhnie Lozove =

Nyzhnie Lozove Нижнє Лозове
- Village
- Location of Nyzhnie Lozove within Ukraine Nyzhnie Lozove (Ukraine)
- Coordinates: 48.401111°N 38.356389°E
- Country: Ukraine
- Oblast: Donetsk Oblast
- District: Horlivka Raion
- Elevation: 245 m (804 ft)

Population (2001 census)
  - Total: 11
- Time zone: UTC+2 (EET)
  - Summer (DST): UTC+3 (EEST)
- Postal code: 84582
- Area code: +380 6274

Nyzhnie Lozove (Ukrainian: Нижнє Лозове; Russian: Нижнее Лозовое) is a village in Horlivka Raion (district) in Donetsk Oblast of eastern Ukraine, at 61.8 km NE from the centre of Donetsk city.

The settlement was taken under control of pro-Russian forces during the War in Donbass, that started in 2014.

== Demographics ==
In 2001 the settlement had 11 inhabitants. As of the Ukrainian Census of 2001, all of them spoke Ukrainian.
