= Lohvynove =

Lohvynove Логвинове
- Village
- Location of Lohvynove within Ukraine Lohvynove (Ukraine)
- Coordinates: 48.375833°N 38.348889°E
- Country: Ukraine
- Oblast: Donetsk Oblast
- District: Horlivka Raion

Area
  - Total: 58.6 km^{2} (22.6 sq mi)
- Elevation: 269 m (883 ft)

Population (2001 census)
  - Total: 57
  - Density: 0.97/km^{2} (2.5/sq mi)
- Time zone: UTC+2 (EET)
  - Summer (DST): UTC+3 (EEST)
- Postal code: 84583
- Area code: +380 6274

Lohvynove (Ukrainian: Логвинове; Russian: Логвиново) is a village in Horlivka Raion (district) in Donetsk Oblast of eastern Ukraine, at 58.6 km NE from the centre of the Oblast administrative centre, Donetsk, at about 4 km NW from Debaltseve.

The settlement was taken under control of pro-Russian forces during the War in Donbass, that started in 2014. The conflict has brought both civilian and military casualties.

== Demographics ==
The settlement had 57 inhabitants in 2001. Native language distribution as of the Ukrainian Census of 2001:

- Ukrainian: 71.93%
- Russian: 28.07%
