= Muslim Corps "Caucasus" =

Ukrainian military unit of Caucasian volunteers

- Мусульманський корпус «Кавказ»
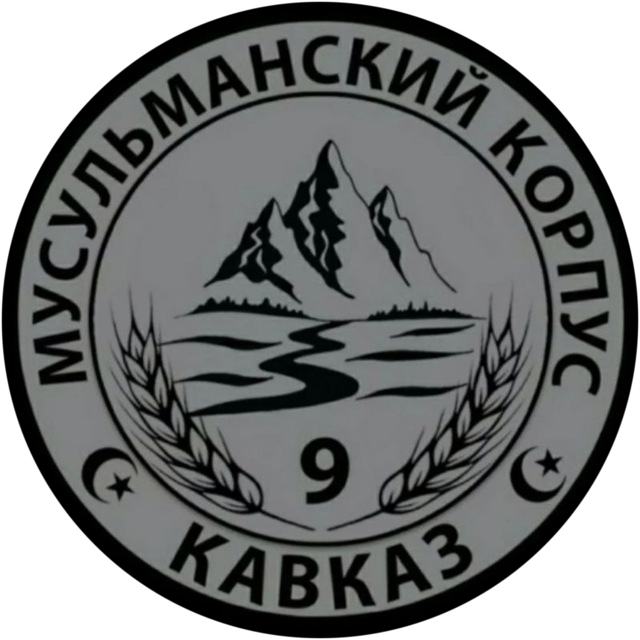
- The unit's emblem: "9" representing the Tukkhum of Ichkeria
- Active: 24 February 2022 – present
- Countries: Various
- Allegiance: Ukraine
- Branch: Armed Forces of Ukraine
- Type: Infantry
- Role: Sabotage; reconnaissance
- Nicknames: MK Kavkaz; DRG "Unified Caucasus"
- Engagements: Russo-Ukrainian war (2022–present): Battle of Kyiv; Battle of Bakhmut
- Website: ichkeria.net

Commanders
- Notable commanders: Muaz "KBK" Kabardinsky

The Muslim Corps "Caucasus" (abbr. MK Kavkaz), (Note: Ukrainian: Мусульманський корпус «Кавказ», romanized: Musulʹmansʹkyy korpus «Kavkaz») also known as the Sabotage and Reconnaissance Group "Unified Caucasus" (abbr. DRG "Unified Caucasus"), (Note: Ukrainian: диверсійно розвідувальна група «Єдиний Кавказ», romanized: Dyversiyno Rozviduvalʹna Hrupa «Yedynyy Kavkaz») is a Ukrainian military unit composed primarily of Caucasian volunteers, particularly Chechens, but also Ingush, Avars, and Circassians. It was formed as a united front in Kyiv during the 2022 Russian invasion of Ukraine and has since taken part in several major ground battles of the ongoing Russo-Ukrainian war.

A large number of the unit's members come from Russian republics in the North Caucasus and have been charged with terrorism and treason by the Ministry of Justice of Russia, which accuses MK Kavkaz of having ties to Salafi jihadist groups that fought in Chechnya and Syria. It is not part of the International Legion for Ukraine.

== History ==
MK Kavkaz was first formed in Kyiv beginning in 2022 during the outbreak of the Russo-Ukrainian war, many of the units servicemembers are veterans of the Donbass War which began in 2014. The unit was created at the request of Muslims living in Ukraine following the 2022 Russian invasion of Ukraine. Although not part of the International Legion, the unit is primarily made up of Muslim volunteers from throughout the Caucasus and Ukraine including Azerbaijanis, Circassians, Tatars, Uyghurs, Chechens, Ingush people, Avars, and other Muslims in Ukraine. The unit most notably took part in the Battle of Kyiv (2022) and the Battle of Bakhmut.

=== Members with Russian citizenship ===
The Ministry of Justice in Russia has accused Russian members of MK Kavkaz of treason and terrorism under Article 207.3 and Article 275 of the criminal Code of Russia, among those prosecuted are Muaz Kibishev, a volunteer of MK Kavkaz from Kabardino-Balkaria. Kibishev, a resident of Ukraine since 2021, stated in an interview with Radio Free Europe that he volunteered for service in MK Kavkaz dude to the persecution of his religion while living in Russia where he was arrested and forced to live in a penal colony. The Russian government has claimed that Kibishev has ties to the United Vilayat of Kabarda, Balkaria and Karachay; Kibishev, however, claims that weapons were planted on him by Russian authorities.

Special Eurasia, has accused volunteers of MK Kavkaz of belonging to both the Caucasus Emirate and Ajnad al-Kavkaz, both of which are Salafi jihadist groups that fought in the Second Chechen War and later in the Syrian civil war. Russian military blogger Semyon Pegov of WarGonzo claimed in a 2022 post on Zen that MK Kavkaz is affiliated with neo-Nazism as a consolidated unit of jihadist fighters.

== Commanders ==
- Muaz Kabardinsky ("Muaz KBK"), one of the founders and the main commanders of MK Kavkaz. Kabardinsky has previously voiced opposition to Ukraine's diplomatic support for Israel following the October 7 attacks in 2023.

== See also ==
- Foreign fighters in the Russo-Ukrainian war
- Ukrainian volunteer battalions
- Foreign involvement in the Russo-Ukrainian war (2022–present)
  - Chechen involvement in the Russo-Ukrainian war
  - Chechen volunteers on the side of Ukraine
