= 34th Assault Battalion "Mad Pack" =

Anti-Russian Chechen volunteer unit

- 34-й штурмовий батальйон «Шалена зграя» 34-y shturmovyy batalʹyon «Shalena z·hraya»
- Official patch of the 34th Assault Battalion
- Active: 2014 – present
- Countries: Ukraine; Chechnya
- Allegiance: Ukraine; Chechen Republic of Ichkeria
- Branch: Armed Forces of Ukraine
- Type: Infantry
- Role: Assault Battalion
- Part of: 57th Motorized Brigade
- Engagements: Donbass War; Russo-Ukrainian war: Battle of Donbas (2022); 2022 Kherson counteroffensive; Battle of Bakhmut; Battle of Avdiivka (2023–2024)
- Website: ichkeria.net

Commanders
- Notable commanders: Kazbek "Dzurdzuk" Lechaevich Abdurzakov

The 34th Assault Battalion “Mad Pack” or “Crazy Pack” (Ukrainian: 34-й штурмовий батальйон «Шалена зграя», romanized: 34-y shturmovyy batalʹyon «Shalena z·hraya» Russian: 34-й штурмовой батальон «Безумная стая», romanized: 34-y shturmovoy batal'on «Bezumnaya staya»), is a volunteer assault unit within the Armed Forces of Ukraine composed primarily of ethnic Chechen volunteers fighting as part of the broader Chechen volunteers on the side of Ukraine during both the War in Donbas and the Russo-Ukrainian war.

== History ==
=== Formation ===
The 34th Assault Battalion was founded in 2014 during the War in Donbas. The unit currently falls under the overall command of the 57th Motorized Brigade. According to the unit's official website, a minority of the battalion also consists of Ukrainian and Azerbaijani personnel. The unit has close ties to the Dzhokhar Dudayev Battalion and the Sheikh Mansur Battalion which are also composed of Chechen volunteers.

=== Namesake ===
The 34th Assault Battalion was nicknamed "mad pack" or "crazy pack" (Ukrainian: Шалена зграя) by soldiers serving in the battalion due to their willingness to take part in high risk operations and unconventional warfare.

== Commanders ==
- Kazbek Lechaevich Abdurzakov (nom de guerre "Dzurdzuk") - battalion commander. Abdurzakov was born in Grozny and graduated from the Grozny State Oil Technical University. Abdurzakov fought in the Second Chechen War, following the war he moved to Khmelnytskyi where he worked as a coal trader. Abdurzakov originally served in the Dzhokhar Dudayev Battalion before creating the 34th Assault Battalion in 2014. Abdurzakov was awarded the People's Hero of Ukraine award on January 15, 2016.

== See also ==
- Chechen volunteers on the side of Ukraine
- International Legion (Ukraine)
- Foreign fighters in the Russo-Ukrainian war
- Ukrainian volunteer battalions
- Chechen Republic of Ichkeria
