= Chechen involvement in the Russo-Ukrainian war =

The Chechen Republic, commonly known as Chechnya, is a federal republic of Russia that has been noted in several roles during the Russo-Ukrainian war starting since 2014 focusing in the War in Donbas in Eastern Ukraine and especially during the escalation of the war since the 2022 Russian invasion of Ukraine. Kadyrovite forces have fought alongside the Russian forces, while several Chechen armed volunteer formations, mostly anti-Kadyrov and Putin, are fighting on the Ukrainian side. International observers have noted a number of comparisons between the invasion and the First and Second Chechen Wars.

== Pro-Ukrainian forces ==
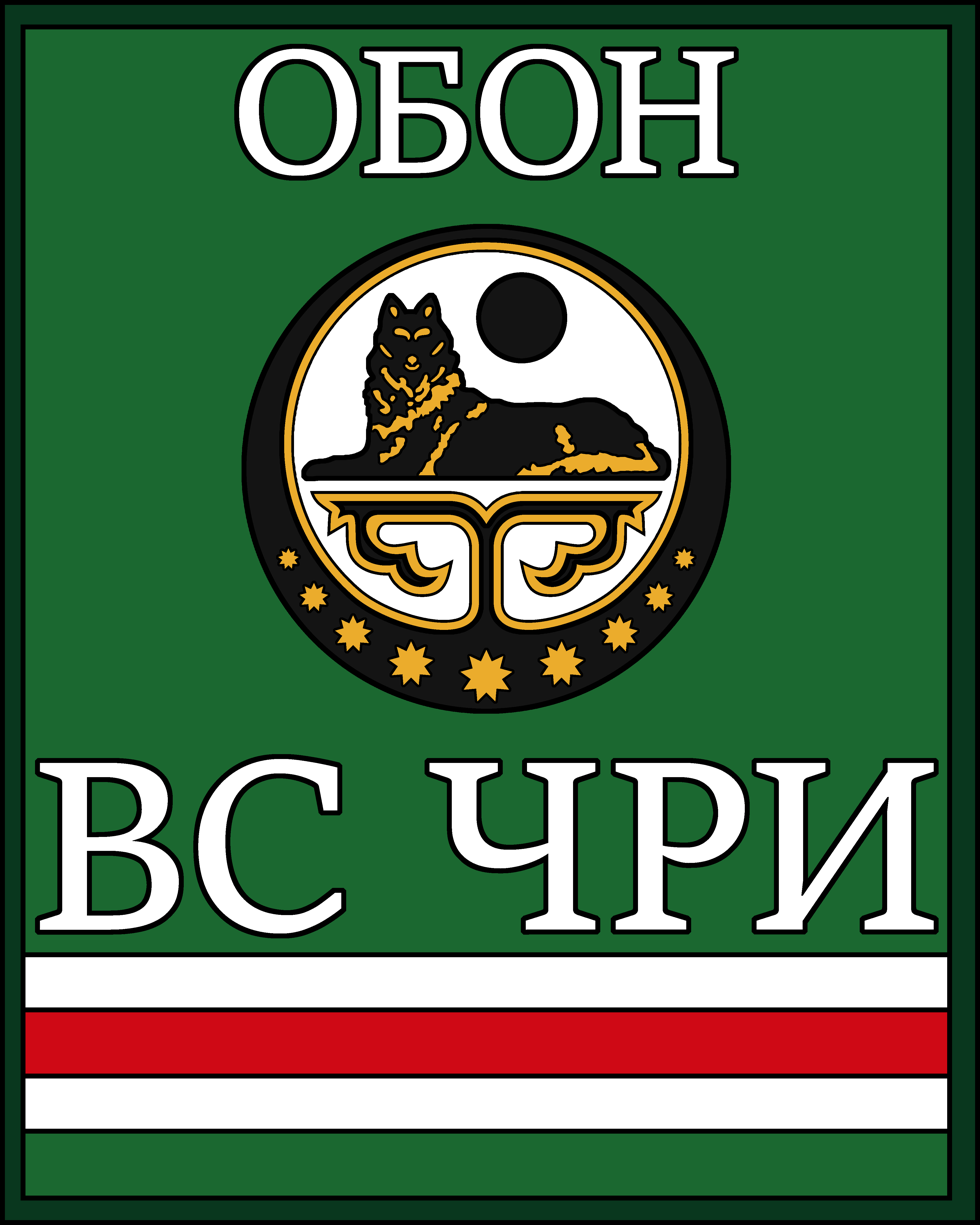
Chevron of the Separate Special Purpose Battalion closely affiliated with the Chechen Republic of Ichkeria in exile

Many Chechen groups have formed or moved to Ukraine throughout the Russian Invasion of Ukraine. Several hundred fighters have joined the war, most joining one of many such groups. Today, there are several Chechen armed volunteer formations fighting on the side of Ukraine. Some of these groups started operations during the Donbas war in 2014. Most fighters see fighting in Ukraine as a way of continuing the fight against Russia, getting them closer to their ultimate goal of Chechen Independence. Chechen groups in Ukraine have in the past been criticized for having Islamist elements.

One of these groups is the Dzhokhar Dudayev Battalion, named after Dzhokhar Dudayev, which consists of several hundred fighters and started operations during the Donbas war. Another group that has been fighting since 2014 is the Sheikh Mansur Battalion, a group criticized for recruiting Islamist members and having ties with Islamist groups. The Sheikh Mansur Battalion is headed by Muslim Cheberloevsky. The Sheikh Mansur Battalion helped 25 members of the Chechen-led Syrian Islamist group Ajnad al-Kavkaz, including its commander Abdul Hakim al-Shishani, join the fight in Ukraine. The Sheikh Mansur Battalion announced in July 2022 that they would be spreading their operations to Chechnya proper.

Another two armed battalions fighting for Ukraine are the Khamzat Gelayev Joint Task Detachment and the Separate Special Purpose Battalion, both formed recently. The Separate Special Purpose Battalion, which is part of the Foreign Legion of Ukraine, was formed in July 2022 and claims to be the armed force of the Chechen Republic of Ichkeria's government in exile. The Separate Special Purpose Battalion is headed by Zumso Hadji-Murad and fought in the 2022 Kherson counteroffensive. The Khamzat Gelayev Joint Operational Detachment, a relatively secretive group, is another Chechen group operating in Ukraine.

22 September 2022, the head of the government of the Chechen Republic of Ichkeria in exile Akhmed Zakayev stated that, in addition to the Dzhokhar Dudayev battalion, four more Chechen battalions are fighting on the side of Ukraine.

== Pro-Russian forces ==
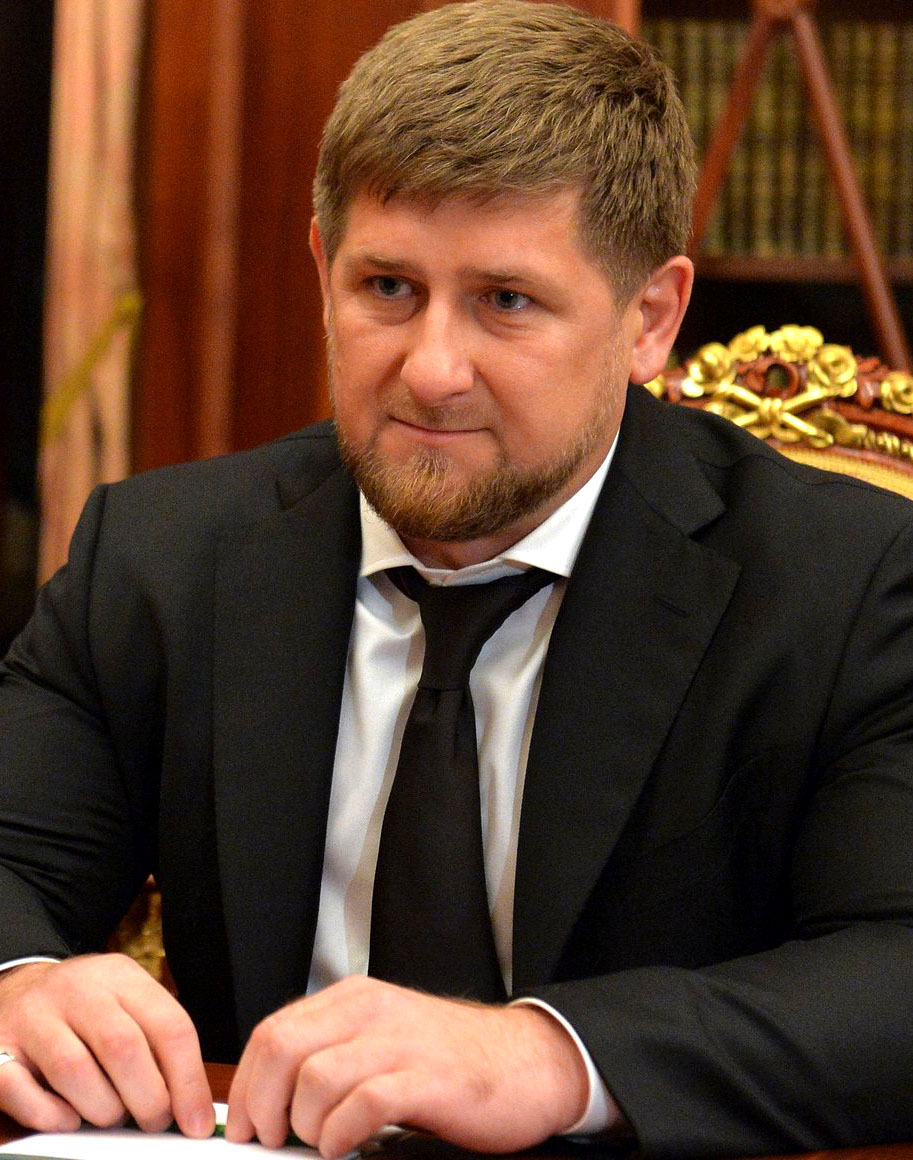
Ramzan Kadyrov, leader of the pro-Russian Kadyrovites who fought against Ukraine during the Russian invasion of the country

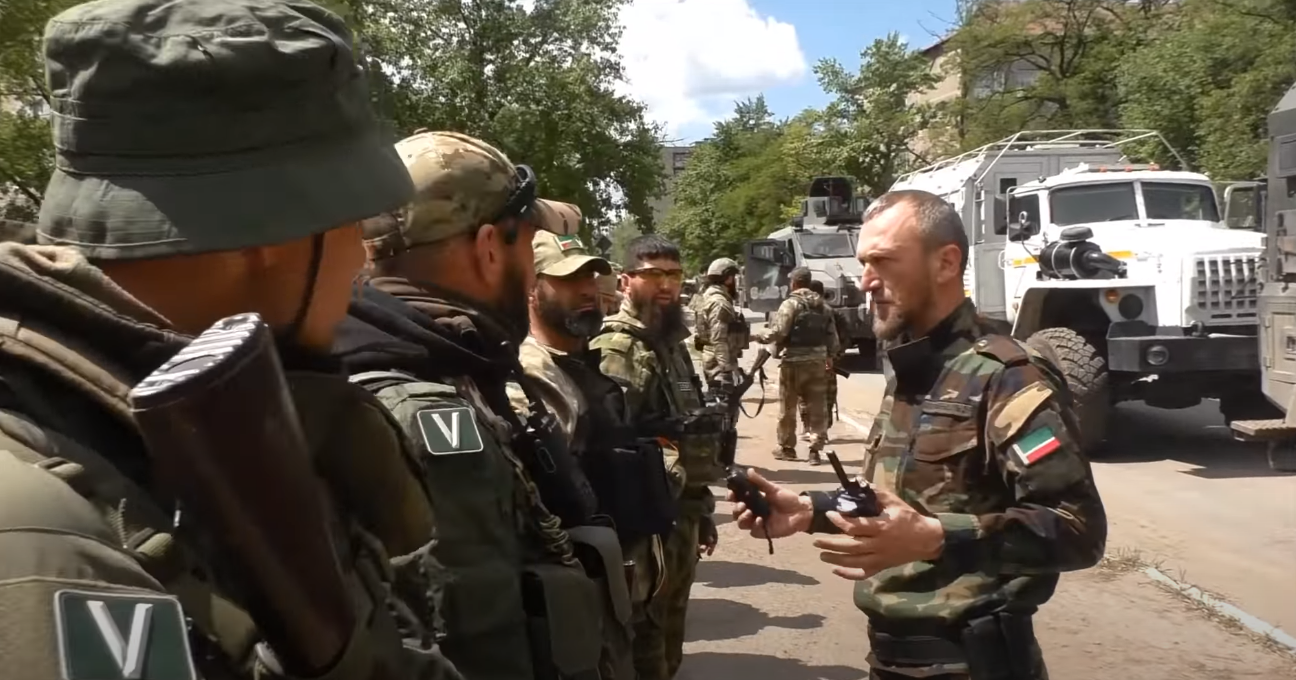
Chechen soldiers of the Russian Armed Forces in Donbas, 30 June 2022

On 26 February 2022, Ramzan Kadyrov, the Head of the Chechen Republic, announced that Chechen military forces had been deployed to Ukraine, saying that Vladimir Putin "took the right decision and we will carry out his orders under any circumstances." The same day, the Russian state media outlet RT published a video of what it described as 12,000 Chechen soldiers gathered in the main square of Grozny, the Chechen capital, preparing to go to war in Ukraine.

On 27 February, the Ukrainian military announced that it had destroyed a large convoy of Chechen special forces gathered near Hostomel, a town in the northwest region of Kyiv Oblast. Soon after, the Ukrainian military claimed that General Magomed Tushayev, leader of the 141st Motorized Regiment of the Kadyrov Guard, had been killed in action in Ukraine.

On 28 February, Kadyrov released a Telegram post saying that "the chosen tactics in Ukraine are too slow," calling for Russian forces to take more aggressive action. On 1 March, Kadyrov released a further Telegram post saying that two Chechen soldiers had been killed and six injured and saying that the invasion needed "to move on to large-scale measures."

On 3 March, The Times reported that a group of Chechen soldiers had been sent to infiltrate Kyiv with the goal of assassinating Ukrainian president Volodymyr Zelenskyy, but that the group had been neutralised following leaks from anti-war elements of the Russian Federal Security Service.

On 14 March, Kadyrov posted a video of himself on social media claiming that he was in Hostomel as part of the Russian offensive on Kyiv. There was no independent verification of his claim. Online newspaper Ukrayinska Pravda claimed that on 16 March they tricked Kadyrov into accessing a link under the guise of the Russian media RIA Novosti to obtain Kadyrov's IP address, which revealed the geolocation of Kadyrov's phone to be Grozny, Chechnya, instead of Ukraine. Dmitry Peskov, Putin's press secretary, later stated that Kadyrov "did not directly claim that he was in Ukraine."

On 5 April, Kadyrov posted a video on Telegram which shows a group of militants apparently being held captive. He claimed that 267 soldiers from the Ukrainian Navy 503rd Battalion surrendered to Russia. Former US Navy SEAL Chuck Pfarrer believed the claim to be spotty, explaining that the captives appeared to be nearly unscathed and wore outfits which did not match the official Ukrainian marines uniform.

In late June 2022, Kadyrov announced the creation of four new battalions consisting only of ethnic Chechens. These battalions would be named "North-Akhmat", "South-Akhmat", "West-Akhmat," and "East-Akhmat", according to Kadyrov, and that they would be sent to fight in Ukraine.

In early September 2022, Kadyrov announced the dispatch of a further two Chechen battalions to Ukraine and published a video on telegram showing their departure. This announcement was made amid the Russian retreat from Kharkiv Oblast.

On 31 May 2023, the Institute for the Study of War reported that Kadyrov's forces were likely replacing the role of Wagner PMC as Russia's main shock troops in the Donbas after Wagner disengaged from the front line after the capture of Bakhmut earlier in the month. Kadyrov stated that his forces, including "Akhmat" Special Forces and the "Sever-Akhmat" Special Purpose Regiment had been given a directive to "active combat activities" in Donetsk Oblast.

On 3 July 2023, Chechen leader Apta Alaudinov announced that the commander of the Chechen Akhmat Unit, Yevgeny Pisarenko, had been killed whilst fighting on the Donbas frontline.

On 7 October 2026, Mediazona reported that at least 607 Russian soldiers from the Chechen republic had been killed in Ukraine since 24 February 2022.

== Reactions ==
On 28 February, the National Guard of Ukraine published a video showing members of the far-right Azov Battalion greasing bullets with pig fat, with the speaker in the video saying "Dear Muslim brothers. In our country, you will not go to heaven. You will not be allowed into heaven. Go home, please."

A number of analysts have stated that the presence of Kadyrovite forces in Ukraine is more focused on creating a psychological effect than on participating in fighting. Writing for Foreign Policy, Justin Ling stated that Russian media was "leveraging the very presence of Chechen soldiers in Ukraine as a psychological weapon against Ukrainians," while University of Ottawa professor Jean-François Ratelle that it was "about making people believe that what happened in Chechnya will happen in Ukraine—that they'll rampage the city, loot, rape, and kill." Aleksandre Kvakhadze of the Georgian Foundation for Strategic and International Studies has stated that "the footage and metadata show most Chechen forces are at least 20km away from the frontline, the only things they do is record videos to motivate people inside Chechnya and promote the warrior image of Kadyrov and his forces."

According to the Russian human rights activist Elena Milashina the Chechen volunteer formation “Akhmat” is 96 percent non-Chechen and mostly consists of ethnic Russians. Former volunteers in the battalion such as Andrei Panchenko also claimed that people of Chechen and Ingush ethnicity were exempt from performing duties on the front-lines and were separately marked on the military papers.

== Comparisons to the Russia–Chechnya conflict ==
A number of commentators have made comparisons between the Russian invasion of Ukraine and the Chechen wars of the 1990s, notably the Battle of Grozny. Russian human rights group Memorial director Aleksandr Cherkasov stated that "Putin started the same way in Chechnya as he has in Ukraine and continues as we move to a new stage of the conflict. It also began with a war that was originally called a 'counterterrorist operation' and was not described as an armed conflict." Tracey German of King's College London wrote that:

Putin appears to have anticipated a repeat of Russia's decisive seizure of Crimea in 2014 or its invasion of Georgia in 2008 – but what we have seen is more similar to its intervention in Chechnya in December 1994 when the Russian armed forces were initially unable to convert their military superiority (certainly in terms of numbers) into military and strategic success, and thousands of Russian troops proved unable to secure the North Caucasian republic...
There are echoes of the Russian intervention into Chechnya in late December 1994 here, when the Russian leadership planned a massive armoured offensive against the Chechen capital, Grozny, intending to stage a decisive strike with air support, relying on speed to take the Chechen leadership by surprise and ensure Russia held the initiative. But the Chechen forces had been long prepared for a strike against the city and the attack was a dismal failure.

Scottish journalist Neal Ascherson wrote that "Putin's plan seems to have two stages. First, military victory, achieved mainly by isolating resistance in a few cities and then shelling them to blackened husks, as the Russians did to Grozny in Chechnya."

== See also ==
- Foreign fighters in the Russo-Ukrainian war
