= 141st Special Motorized Regiment =

Chechen Russian national guards unit

- 141-й специальный моторизованный полк
- Emblem of the 141st Motorized Regiment
- Founded: 2006 (as a battalion)
- Countries: Russia; Chechnya
- Allegiance: Ramzan Kadyrov
- Type: Motorized infantry
- Part of: Russian National Guard; Kadyrovsky
- Garrison/HQ: Grozny, Chechnya
- Nickname: Kadyrovites (Russian: Кадыровцы)
- Motto: "Akhmad is strength!" (Russian: Ахмат — сила!) Chechen: Ахмат — чьох ву!
- Colors: A-TACS
- Engagements: Second Chechen War; Insurgency in the North Caucasus; Syrian Civil War; Russian intervention in the Syrian civil war; Russo-Ukrainian War; Russian invasion of Ukraine; Battle of Hostomel; Battle of Antonov Airport; Siege of Mariupol; Battle of Donbas; 2023 Ukrainian counteroffensive; Wagner Group rebellion

Commanders
- Current commander: Magomed Tushayev

Insignia
- Flag of Chechnya

The 141st Special Motorized Regiment, (Note: Russian: 141-й специальный моторизованный полк) (Note: Known fully as the 141st Special Motorized Regiment named after Hero of the Russian Federation A. A. Kadyrov (Russian: 141-й специальный моторизованный полк имени Героя Российской Федерации А. А. Кадырова)) colloquially known as the Kadyrovites (Note: Russian: Кадыровцы, lit. 'Kadyrov's followers', after Akhmad Kadyrov) is a regiment of the 46th Separate Operational Brigade of the North Caucasian district of the National Guard Forces Command of the Russian Federation headquartered in Grozny, Chechnya, Russia. It was established on May 29, 2006, under the name 248th Special Motorized Battalion "North", which renamed into the current name in 2010.

== See also ==
- Chechen involvement in the Russian invasion of Ukraine
- Special Battalions Vostok and Zapad
- Chechen volunteers on the side of Ukraine
