= Khamzat Gelayev Detachment =

Chechen military unit aligned with Ukraine

Khamzat Gelayev Battalion
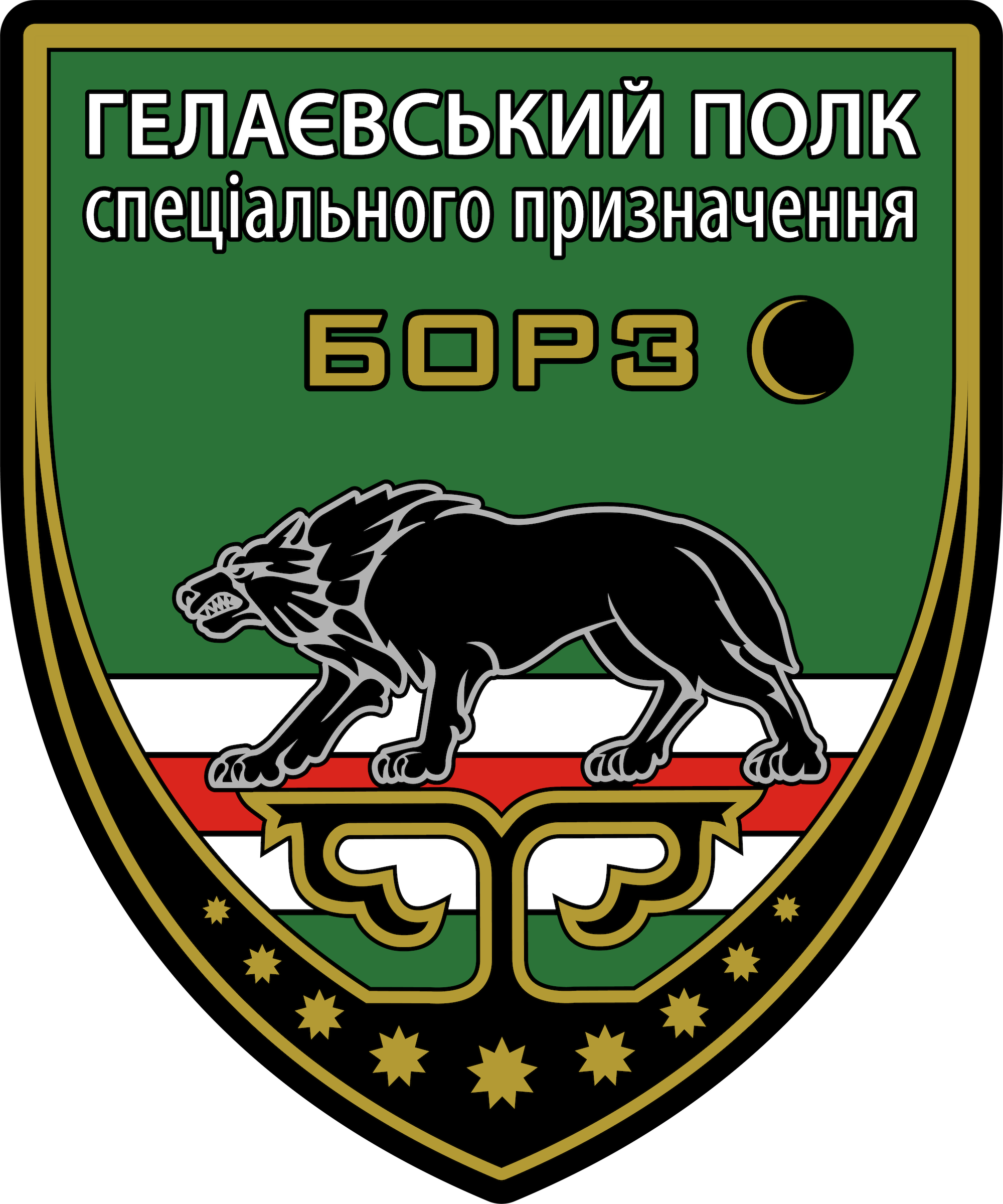
- Active: 2022–present
- Country: Ukraine
- Allegiance: Ministry of Defence of the CHRI abroad
- Type: Armed formation
- Role: Positional, sabotage and reconnaissance, guerrilla warfare
- Nickname: Борз полк (Borz Regiment)
- Patron: Ruslan Gelayev
- Motto: Marşo ya joƶalla ("Freedom or Death")
- Engagements: Russo-Ukrainian War; Joint Forces Operation (Ukraine); Battle of Donbas (2022)
- Website: borz.army

The Khamzat Gelayev Detachment (Russian: Хамзат Гелаев Отряд, romanized: Khamzat Gelayev Otryad) also known as the Khamzat Gelayev Battalion or the Borz Regiment, is a formation of Chechen volunteers and part of a broader movement of Chechen volunteers on the side of Ukraine who serve as part of the larger International Legions in the Russo-Ukrainian War.

== History ==
Founded in 2022, the Khamzat Gelayev Battalion or Khamzat Gelayev Detachment is named after Ruslan “Khamzat” Gelayev, a legendary commander of the Chechen resistance during the First Chechen War and Second Chechen War. Gelayev, killed in 2004, remains a revered figure for many Ichkerian patriots. His legacy of guerrilla warfare, courage, and national dignity forms the ideological backbone of the unit.

The unit is considered by many Chechens to be the successor formation of Gelayev's Borz Regiment which was founded in 1993 as part of the Armed Forces of the Chechen Republic of Ichkeria and fought in both the First Chechen War and Second Chechen War. The formation is politically aligned with the Chechen Republic of Ichkeria and its government-in-exile under Akhmed Zakayev.

The Borz Regiment was thought to have been dissolved in 2000 after their loss to Russian troops at the Battle of Komsomolskoye. The battalion is part of the foreign intelligence department of the Armed Forces of the Chechen Republic of Ichkeria, and has fought as part of the International Legion during the Russo-Ukrainian War.

== Role in the Russo-Ukraine War ==
Since 2014 Chechens have been volunteers on the side of Ukraine and assisted the Armed Forces of Ukraine in both the War in Donbas starting in 2014, and later the Russo-Ukrainian War in 2022. The Khamzat Gelayev Detachment was formally created in the spring of 2022, the units area of operations in 2023 include deployments the Donbas and Kherson regions of Ukraine where it engaged in reconnaissance and sabotage operations. Zakayev said that the battalion would be composed of existing experienced troops involved in "territorial defence and various other structures" of the Armed Forces of Ukraine. In 2024 the Khamzat Gelayev Detachment was involved in several cross-border raids and operations into Belgorod and the region of Kursk during the Kursk campaign, including the March 2024 western Russia incursion.
