= Ukrainian territorial defence =

Ukrainian territorial defence may refer to:

- Ukrainian territorial defence battalions, military units mobilized in March 2014 and integrated into Ukrainian Ground Forces in November
- Territorial Defence Forces (Ukraine), a military reserve component of the Ukrainian Armed Forces formed in January 2015

== See also ==
- Ukrainian volunteer battalions, during the war in Donbas (2014–2022)
- Special Police Forces (Ukraine)
