= Jamaat Jund al-Qawqaz =

Armed group based in the Quneitra Governorate of Syria

- كتيبة أحرار ألشركس
- The group uses the Circassian flag
- Leader: Abu Hatab al-Sharkassy
- Dates active: February 2013 — present
- Allegiance: Syrian opposition
- Headquarters: Beer Ajam, Quneitra Governorate
- Active regions: Quneitra Governorate and Latakia Governorate(during the Syrian Civil War); Ukraine (since 2022)
- Ideology: Sunni Islamic fundamentalism Anti-Russian; North Caucasian separatism
- Part of: Ajnad al-Kavkaz (since 2014)
- Wars: the Syrian Civil war 2022 Russian invasion of Ukraine

Jamaat Jund al-Qawqaz, originally formed as Ahrar al-Sharkas (Arabic: كتيبة أحرار ألشركس, The Free Circassian Battalion), is an armed group based in the Quneitra Governorate of Syria with some fighters in the Latakia Governorate. The group is made up of ethnic Circassians from Beer Ajam. The group came to prominence during the Quneitra Governorate clashes (2012–14).

== History ==
The group was founded by a local from Beer Ajam of Circassian descent who goes by the nom de guerre Abu Hatab al-Sharkassy who has expressed support for the Caucasus Emirate. In 2014 he declared allegiance to Ajnad al-Kavkaz, thus making Ahrar al-Sharkas part of it and moved some fighters to the Latakia Governorate to be closer to the central core of Ajnad al-Kavkaz. After their declaration of allegiance to Ajnad Al-Kavkaz, Ajnad Al-Kavkaz officially recognized itself as active in the Quneitra Governorate. During the Russo-Ukrainian War, a part of the group went to Ukraine to fight against Russia alongside Ajnad al-Kavkaz.
