= Ajnad al-Kavkaz =

Chechen-led Salafi jihadist militant group in Syria

Soldiers of the Caucasus Ajnad al-Kavkaz
- Arabic: أجناد القوقاز
- Flag of Ajnad al-Kavkaz.
- Leaders: Abdul Hakim al-Shishani (Rustam Azhiev) (overall emir); Khamza al-Shishani † (military emir); Abu Bakr al-Shishani (commander, 2016–17); Abd al-Rahman al-Shishani
- Dates active: 2015–present
- Active regions: Northwestern Syria; Idlib Governorate; Latakia Governorate; Hama Governorate; Ukraine (since 2022)
- Ideology: Islamic fundamentalism Salafi jihadism Russophobia; North Caucasian separatism
- Size: 2014: 80+ (Jamaat al-Khilafa al-Qawqazia); 32 (Jamaat Jund al-Qawqaz); 2016: 100+; 2017: c. 50–100; 2018: c. 200
- Part of: Army of Conquest (formerly)
- Wars: Syrian Civil War

Ajnad al-Kavkaz (AK or AAK; Arabic: أجناد القوقاز, romanized: Ajnād al-Qawqāz, lit. 'Soldiers of the Caucasus') is a Chechen-led militant group which emerged in northwestern Syria, operating primarily in the mountainous and forested areas of Latakia Governorate. Although it was formed by former fighters of the Caucasus Emirate and was tentatively linked to the organization, AK operated autonomously from the beginning and later cut ties with the Caucasus Emirate. Though it had become "the largest of the Muslim factions from the former Soviet Union fighting in Syria" by September 2016, AK's activity dwindled in the following years.

In 2022, the group's centre of operations shifted from Syria to Ukraine, as most AK militants had begun mobilizing to fight against the Russian invasion of Ukraine. Ukraine-based AK forces were primarily engaged in the battle of Bakhmut in 2023. The Syrian branch of the group took part in the 2024 Syrian opposition offensives which led to the fall of the Assad regime, but was subsequently pressured by the new Syrian transitional government to integrate into the Syrian Army's 84th Division.

== History ==
=== Foundation ===
In course of the Second Chechen War's last phase around 2009, numerous Caucasus Emirate fighters temporarily moved to Turkey, often for medical treatment, but were thereafter unable to return to Russia to continue their insurgency. Thus stranded, the militants settled down in Turkey and Syria in involuntary exile, though continued to plan their eventual return to their homelands in North Caucasus. Their situation changed dramatically, however, when the Syrian Civil War broke out in 2011, as the Chechen militants picked up their weapons again, formed many militias and joined local Syrian Islamists in their rebellion against Bashar al-Assad's government.

The two small militias which later founded Ajnad al-Kavkaz were initially active in the Latakia and Quneitra Governorates: The first one was Jamaat al-Khilafa al-Qawqazia ("the Caucasian Caliphate Group"), which had been founded in 2013 and was led by Abdul Hakim al-Shishani. Abdul Hakim had been commander of the central sector of the Caucasus Emirate's Vilayat Nokhchicho in 2007–09, and his unit consisted of veterans of the Second Chechen War. The second one was Jamaat Jund al-Qawqaz ("Group of Soldiers of the Caucasus"), a small militia of Islamist Circassians from the Golan Heights and Jordan, which soon pledged allegiance (bay'ah) to Abdul Hakim. Both were initially members of Ansar al-Sham, and were loosely affiliated with the Caucasus Emirate.

The two groups eventually left Ansar al-Sham in 2014, (Note: Though the Jamestown Foundation claimed that Ajnad al-Kavkaz was still a member of Ansar al-Sham in 2015, this has been contradicted by several other sources.) while Jamaat Jund al-Qawqaz was strengthened when Ahrar al-Sharkas ("The Free Circassians") in Quneitra joined their group in November 2014. The two groups eventually fully merged under Abdul Hakim's leadership in spring 2015 and adopted the name "Ajnad al-Kavkaz".

=== Operations with the Army of Conquest ===
Ajnad al-Kavkaz fighters during the Second Battle of Idlib. Due to their close cooperation with other jihadist groups during this conflict, Ajnad al-Kavkaz was labelled a "terrorist" organization in the West, much to the consternation of the group.

Ajnad al-Kavkaz went on to join the Army of Conquest, an alliance of Islamist rebel groups led by the al-Nusra Front, and became an "integral component" of it. The militia participated in the large-scale rebel offensive in 2015 that aimed at fully conquering Idlib Governorate from the Assad government. Fighting alongside other Chechen fighters, 45 Ajnad al-Kavkaz militants acted as elite shock troops for the rebels during the Second Battle of Idlib. In course of the following Northwestern Syria offensive (April–June 2015), Ajnad al-Kavkaz helped to capture the Al-Mastumah military base, and fought at Kafr Najad and Muqabala.

In May 2015, Ajnad al-Kavkaz officially declared that it was not part of or affiliated with the Caucasus Emirate or any other militant organization, instead being simply allied with numerous Syrian rebel groups. In course of the 2015–16 Latakia offensive, the group claimed to have defended a hilltop against an attack by Russian ground forces. In late June 2016, Ajnad al-Kavkaz strongly condemned an ISIL terror attack against the Istanbul Atatürk Airport, reaffirming their stance that the targeting of unarmed civilians is against their principles. Soon after, the group took part in another rebel offensive in Latakia, during which one of its military officials was reportedly killed. When the government responded to the offensive by launching intense counter-attacks, Ajnad al-Kavkaz became involved in brutal fighting for the hills at the village of Ayn Issa.

In late 2016, another predominantly North Caucasian militia, Junud al-Sham, largely dissolved, whereupon many of its Chechen fighters joined Ajnad al-Kavkaz. Abdul Hakim al-Shishani's men went on to take part in a rebel offensive aimed at breaking the siege of insurgent-held eastern Aleppo in late 2016, and other operations in northern Hama Governorate in 2016 and 2017.

=== Increasing rebel infighting and reduced activity ===
After the Idlib Governorate clashes between Tahrir al-Sham and Ahrar al-Sham in July 2017, Abdul Hakim al-Shishani and two other Chechen commanders in Syria released a statement in which they declared themselves and their groups neutral, pledging not to interfere in these "internecine feuds". Abdul Hakim even said "May Allah help us not to participate in this [i.e. the infighting among the rebels]". After this joint statement, Ajnad al-Kavkaz largely "disappeared from public view", though it continued to carry out raids against government positions in the western Aleppo Governorate in May and July 2017, cooperating with Malhama Tactical. On 1 October 2017, the militia announced that it would suspend its participation in military operations in Syria until other Islamist groups "determine their strategy in the arena of the Syrian jihad". Despite this, the militia was one of the rebel groups that announced that they would form a joint operations room to counter a new government offensive in northwestern Syria on 1 January 2018.

Ajnad al-Kavkaz also commented on the 2017–18 Iranian protests on its Telegram channel, noting that the group hoped that these protests would at least disorganize the "Shi'ite powers" so that perhaps the "Shi'te hordes" would retreat and be defeated during the fighting in Idlib Governorate like the polytheists were defeated during the Battle of the Trench. On 7 January, a VBIED attack hit Ajnad al-Kavkaz's base in Idlib city, causing extensive damage. Although at least 23 civilians were killed, Ajnad al-Kavkaz suffered no casualties as none of its fighters had been present at the time of the bombing. It was unclear who had carried out the attack or even if it had specifically targeted the Chechen-led militia.

As the inter-rebel conflict in Idlib continued to escalate from February 2018, resulting in the Syrian Liberation Front–Tahrir al-Sham conflict and the formation of the Guardians of Religion Organization, Ajnad al-Kavkaz continued to stay neutral and mostly inactive. By this time, the militia had about 200 fighters. In early August 2018, Abdul Hakim al-Shishani and Ajnad al-Kavkaz released a statement on the death on Yusup Temerkhanov, the murderer of Yuri Budanov. Like many other Chechens, Abdul acclaimed Temerkhanov as martyr and hero. In November 2018, Ajnad al-Kavkaz reportedly participated in a raid near Khuwayn in southeastern Idlib; the Syrian Army later claimed to have repelled the attack. Russian media claimed in late January 2019 that the Syrian Army had killed Abu Al-Bara al-Kavkazi, an alleged "ringleader" of Ajnad al-Kavkaz who had been in charge of logistics and recruitment.

On 3 March 2019, Khamza al-Shishani, the deputy emir of the group, was reportedly killed fighting alongside Ansar al-Tawhid in an attack against Syrian government troops in Hama Governorate. This operation did not officially involve Ajnad al-Kavkaz, however, and Khamza probably took part in it as individual fighter. In May 2019, pro-government forces reportedly attacked areas in northern Latakia as part of the Northwestern Syria offensive (April–August 2019) which had served as an Ajnad al-Kavkaz stronghold. The Russian Reconciliation Center for Syria accused Ajnad al-Kavkaz and Tahrir al-Sham of violating the demilitarized zones of Idlib in August 2019. Three months later, Syrian government forces reportedly captured Misherfah in southern Idlib Governorate from a joint garrison of Ajnad al-Kavkaz and Tahrir al-Sham troops. In course of the Northwestern Syria offensive (December 2019–March 2020), Ajnad al-Kavkaz snipers took part in the defense of Jabal Zawiya against advancing government forces; after the offensive's conclusion, the group was among those rebel factions which allegedly resisted the implementation of a ceasefire.

On 5 March 2020, fighters attacked the city of Saraqib, Idlib. The Syrian military repelled the attack, killing at least 150 militants. Some sources pointed out that the attack was carried out by Hayat Tahrir al-Sham and Ajnad al-Kavkaz.

By late 2021, Ajnad al-Kavkaz was still active in Idlib, and loyal to Tahrir al-Sham. Like other Chechen militant groups, however, the unit had become mostly dormant. Journalist Humam Issa reported that as Tahrir al-Sham began to exert more control over Idlib, it "tightened the noose around" Ajnad al-Kavkaz and arrested several of the group's allies. This development contributed to Ajnad al-Kavkaz seeking out other possible battlefields where they could continue their anti-Russian operations.

=== Fighting in Ukraine and new operations in Syria ===
After Russia launched a full invasion of Ukraine in early 2022, journalist Neil Hauer stated that Ajnad al-Kavkaz leader Abdul Hakim al-Shishani was reportedly travelling to Ukraine to join the anti-Russian resistance there. By October 2022, about 25 Ajnad al-Kavkaz fighters, including leader Abdul Hakim al-Shishani, had left Idlib to fight in Ukraine in coordination with the Sheikh Mansur Battalion. According to Humam Issa, most of the militia's other members also intended to eventually move to Ukraine. Abdul Hakim was appointed colonel within the Chechen exile forces. By November, the leader of the Chechen Republic of Ichkeria's government-in-exile, Akhmed Zakayev, appointed Abdul Hakim al-Shishani the deputy commander of the Chechen forces operating alongside the Armed Forces of Ukraine. Ajnad al-Kavkaz forces subsequently fought in the battle of Bakhmut.

In November 2024, Ajnad al-Kavkaz was among the rebel groups which took part in the Operation "Deterrence of Aggression" led by HTS. After the fall of the Assad regime, Ajnad al-Kavkaz fighters filmed themselves in the Umayyad Mosque of Damascus on 9 December, declaring that "We want to celebrate this victory with all our Muslim brothers and sisters." The group's official channel also posted a photo of a beach in Latakia, showcasing the militia's name written into sand with the caption "From the sea in Latakia".

Following the formation of the Syrian transitional government, some members of Ajnad al-Kavkaz were integrated into the new 84th Division, with the Middle East Institute claiming that the entire group had been dissolved. Conversely, a "consistent part" of Ajnad al-Kavkaz were still operating in Ukraine by this point, while the remaining Syrian branch published an open letter in mid-2025, claiming that its fighters were "facing arbitrary detention and coercion" by the transitional government. Enab Baladi journalists Mowaffak al-Khouja, Omar Alaa Eldin and Mohammad Kakhi described Ajnad al-Kavkaz as still being active in Ukraine by November 2025.

== Structure and tactics ==
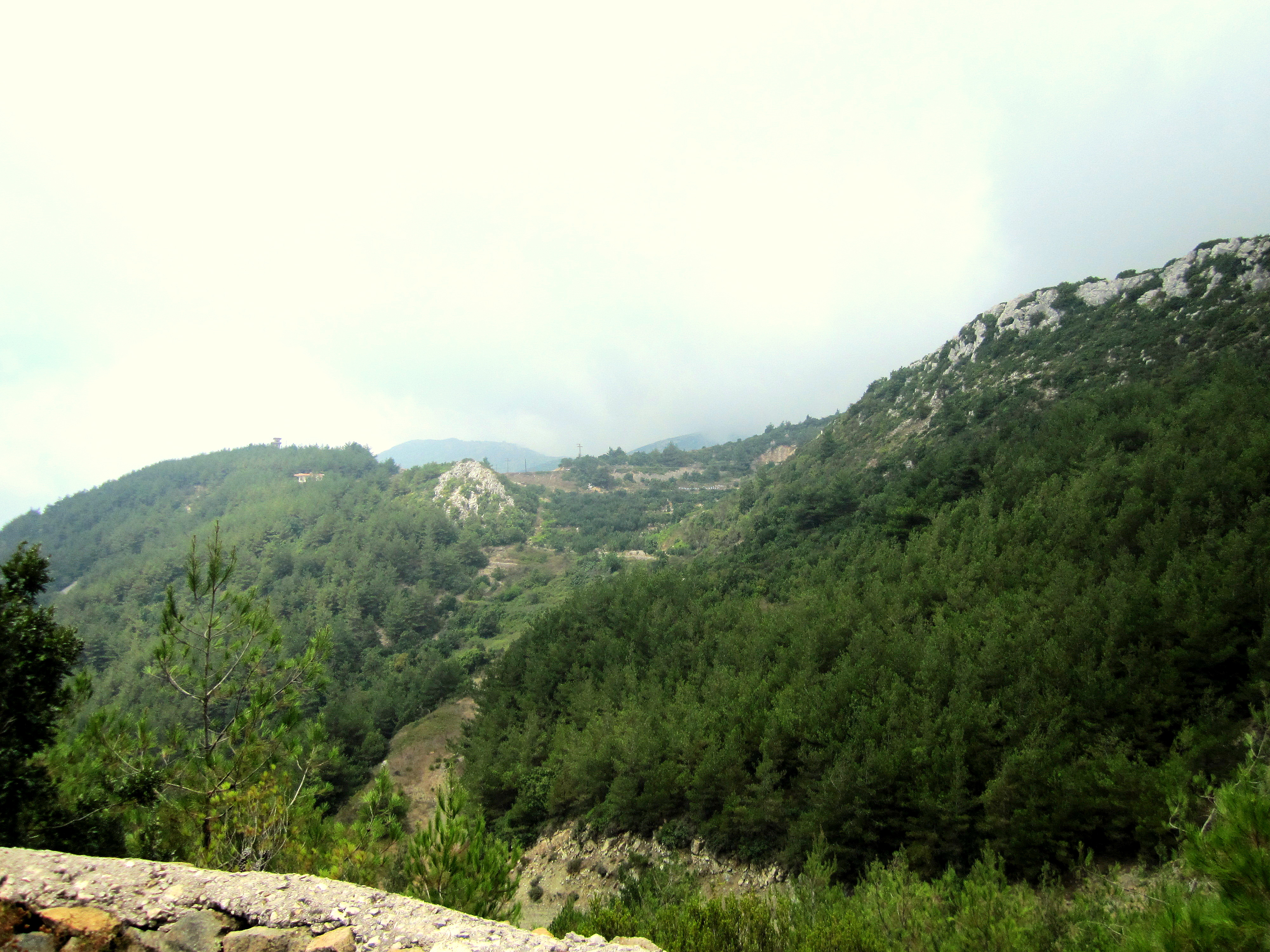
The forested, mountainous areas of Latakia Governorate are well suited to Ajnad al-Kavkaz's type of warfare.

Ajnad al-Kavkaz's leadership is dominated by Chechens: the overall leader is Abdul Hakim al-Shishani (born Rustam Azhiev), who is widely regarded as a very capable and experienced commander, while Khamza al-Shishani, another veteran of the Second Chechen War, served as his second-in-command. Abu Bakr al-Shishani, who fought with Ibn al-Khattab in Chechnya, was also a leading member of the group since his desertion from Junud al-Sham in early 2016. He left Ajnad al-Kavkaz in early 2017, however, when he formed his own small unit, Jamaat Seiful Sham. Despite the prominence of Chechens, the militia has also members from other North Caucasian ethnic groups, Syrian Circassians and Arabs.

Ajnad al-Kavkaz's structure and tactics largely replicate those of the old North Caucasian guerrilla groups, which allow the group to operate very effectively in the forested, mountainous areas of Latakia. This is because of the great similarities of the Caucasus Mountains with northern Latakia; the latter is even nicknamed "Syrian Caucasus" by Ajnad al-Kavkaz militants. Despite its small size, the militia has been regarded as "the most visible and successful North Caucasian-dominated militant faction in Syria". In regards to the group's operations, Abdul Hakim al-Shishani has said that all enemy armed forces are legitimate targets, but disapproves of attacking unarmed civilians, especially if they are Muslims. Ajnad al-Kavkaz also suffers from shortages in funding, and according to Abdul Hakim receives no outside aid, limiting its ability to successfully operate.

In regards to allegiance, Ajnad al-Kavkaz maintains that it is completely independent, and since May 2015 explicitly states that it does not belong to the Caucasus Emirate. Nevertheless, the group generally emphasizes the importance of cooperation and unity among Islamist rebels, and North Caucasian insurgents in particular. It does, however, strongly deny to have ever worked with or being affiliated with ISIL, a charge that was levelled against it by pro-Russian LifeNews.

== Ideology ==
Ajnad al-Kavkaz follows a Sunni Islamic fundamentalist and jihadist ideology, and wants to spread Islam and the Sharia worldwide. However, journalist Humam Issa argued that despite being jihadist, the militia was still rather "moderate" and "did not interfere in the affairs of the Syrian local community". The group's primary aim, however, is to remove the Russian presence in North Caucasus and to establish an Islamic state there, though Abdul Hakim al-Shishani has claimed that these goals are currently unattainable, primarily due to Russia's power. Instead, he believes that sooner or later a world war against Russia will break out, which would allow the North Caucasians to launch a popular, violent uprising to regain their independence from Russia. According to Abdul Hakim, peaceful protests and resistance, though admirable, will never be able to end the Russian rule of the North Caucasus. Ajnad al-Kavkaz is also critical of the economic situation in Russia, and its members believe that the Russian government uses propaganda to distract its people from the widespread economic problems.

Despite this great focus on the eventual conquest of North Caucasus and the reverence for the Chechen Republic of Ichkeria as "glorious chapter in the history of [the Chechen] nation", Abdul Hakim claims that Ajnad al-Kavkaz is not a Chechen nationalist group. Instead, Ajnad al-Kavkaz regards all its activities (including the war against the Assad government) as part of a wider Muslim struggle for freedom and against Russia. Due to these beliefs, Abdul Hakim is very bitter about his group being labelled "terrorists" at the hands of the West. He says that his men do not "kill women, children, or the elderly", and that they only "want to overthrow tyranny. That's all." After several Ajnad al-Kavkaz members moved to Ukraine, one of the group's commanders explained their support for mostly non-Muslim Ukraine was rooted in the fact that "every enemy of Russia is a friend of ours. Also, the Ukrainian people are oppressed, and Islam commanded us to support the oppressed, let alone if the oppressor is a common enemy to us". In 2025, Syrian members of Ajnad al-Kavkaz criticized the Syrian transitional government for undermining "jihadist goals" in favor of democracy.
