= Armed Forces of the Chechen Republic of Ichkeria =

Liberation front of chechen

Chechen National Army
- Chechen: Nóxçiyn Respublik Içkeri Qoman Eskar
- Active: 1991–2000 (end of the main combat phase of the Second Chechen War); 2022–present (under the Ukrainian Armed Forces)
- Country: Chechen Republic of Ichkeria
- Allegiance: Chechen Republic of Ichkeria; Ukraine
- Type: Army
- Headquarters: Grozny (1991–2000); Kyiv, Ukraine (2022–present)
- Sub-branches: General Staff ∟ Army ∟ Air Force
- Engagements: First Chechen War; Second Chechen War; Russian invasion of Ukraine

Commanders
- Commander-in-Chief: Dzhokhar Dudayev (until 1996); Akhmed Zakayev (current)
- Deputy Commander-in-Chief: Rustam Azhiev

The Chechen National Army (Chechen: Noxçiyn Respublika Içkerin Theman Niċq̇aş, Нохчийн Республика Ичкерин ТӀеман НицӀкъаш; Russian: Национальная Армия Чеченской Республики Ичкерия, romanized: Natsionalnaya Armiya Chechenskoy Respubliki Ichkeriya) or Chechen Armed Forces are the united militarized formations of the former de facto Chechen Republic of Ichkeria.

On October 15, 2022, the Armed Forces of the Chechen Republic of Ichkeria were officially resurrected in Ukraine by the Government of Ichkeria in exile, with a center being on the units contributing to the Chechen involvement in the Russian invasion of Ukraine, such as Separate Special Purpose Battalion, which has seen combat in Bakhmut and Belgorod.

== Defence Ministers of Chechnya ==
- Dzhokhar Dudayev (1991-1993) As the first President of Ichkeria he largely controlled all top-level military decision-making.
- Aslan Maskhadov (1994-1996) he was the de-facto Defense Minister
- Zelimkhan Yandarbiyev/Aslan Maskhadov (1996-1998) Following Dudayevs death in 1996 Yanderbiev took over as acting president. followed by Maskhadov's official election, during this transition military leadership remained tied closely to the presidency and the general staff.
- Magomed Khanbiev (1998-2004)
- Rustaman Makhauri (2004-2007)
- Magomed Mutalipov (2022-2026)
- Umar Adamov (2026-present)

== Branches ==
=== Ground Forces ===
Dudayev spent the years from 1991 to 1994 preparing for war, mobilizing men aged 15–55 and seizing Russian weapons depots. This was seen as a bid to prop up Chechnya's independence and sovereignty. Major weapons systems were seized from the Russian military in 1992, and on the eve of the First Chechen War they included 23 air defense guns, 108 APCs and tanks, 24 artillery pieces, 5 MiG-17/15, 2 Mi-8 helicopters, 24 multiple rocket launchers, 17 surface to air missile launchers. The ground forces counted 10,000 troops in December 1994, rising to 40,000 soldiers by early 1996.

Structure:

- General Staff
- Special Purpose Regiment
- Tank Regiment
- Separate Aviation Detachment
- Military college
- Civil defense units

=== Air Force ===
As a result of the withdrawal from the Chechen Republic in 1992, the Russian army left almost all weapons behind, including aircraft and air defense systems. At the Kalinovskaya Airbase, the Armavir Aviation School left 39 combat training aircraft L-39 Albatross, 80 L-29 Dolphin, 3 MiG-17 fighters, 2 MiG-15UTI training aircraft, 6 An-2 aircraft and 2 Mi-8T helicopters (tail numbers "23 Yellow" and "39 Yellow"). The military also had 94 L-29 trainer aircraft, 52 L-39 trainer aircraft, 6 An-2 transport aircraft, and 5 Tupolev Tu-134 transport aircraft. Most of the Chechen aviation equipment was destroyed at airfields in the very first days of the Chechen campaign. The air defense of the air bases consisted of 10 Strela-10 air defense systems, 23 anti-aircraft artillery installations of various types and 7 Igla MANPADS. In addition, according to some media reports, the units of the Mujahideen who fought in Chechnya had a certain number of American-made Stinger MANPADS.

Roundel of the Chechen Air Force

Roundel of the Chechen Air Force (alternative variant)

Coat of Arms of the Chechen Republic of Ichkeria (on Mi-8T helicopters painted with simplified wolf and yellow stars, without black background)

==== Bases ====
Three air bases were used to base the Chechen aviation forces:

- Airbase "Grozny - Severny"
- Airbase "Kalinovskaya"
- Khankala airbase

It was also reported about the ongoing work on the adaptation of several sections of highways for the basing of aircraft.

== National Guard ==
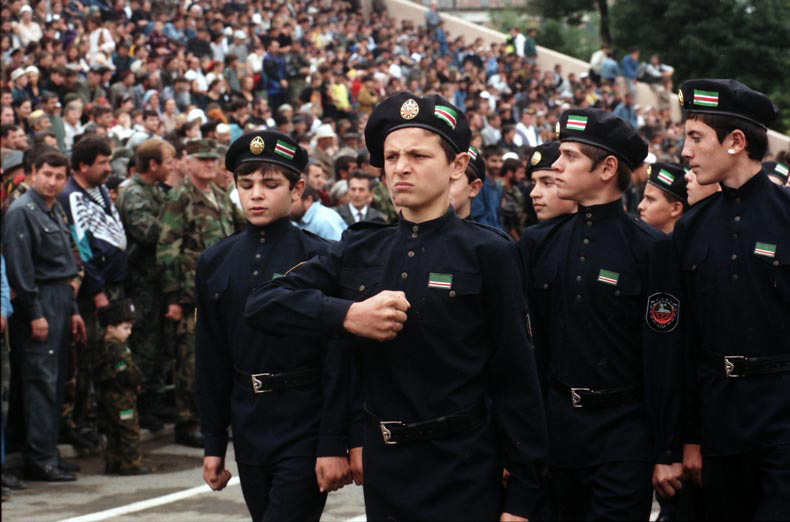
Cadets of the Ichkeria Chechen National Guard in 1999

The Chechen National Guard (Chechen: Nóxçiyn Respublik Içkeri Qoman Gvardi; Russian: Национальная гвардия Чеченской Республики Ичкерия) was a major formation in Chechnya and its military. On March 13, 1997, President Aslan Maskhadov, established the National Guard of the Chechen Republic of Ichkeria, which was to become the only regular armed formation, on the basis of the Armed Forces of the CRI. Brigadier General Magomed Khanbiev was appointed commander of the CRI National Guard. The number of the National Guardsmen was 2,000 and it included the autonomous Presidential Guard, which was directly subordinate to the President. In addition, individual battalions were subordinate to the General Staff and the chairman of the government.

=== Organizational structure ===
- National Guard Units
  - 1st Battalion of the National Guard named after Umalt Dashaev
  - 2nd Battalion of the National Guard named after Khamzat Khankarov
  - 3rd Battalion of the National Guard named after Dzhokhar Dudayev
  - 8th Argun National Guard Battalion
  - 10th Shali Armored Battalion of the National Guard
  - Engineer Battalion
- Presidential Guard
- Security Battalion of the General Staff of the Armed Forces
- Special Battalion under the Cabinet of Ministers of the CRI

== Other paramilitary/security formations ==
- Interior Ministry
- Department of National Security - Based on the former Soviet KGB
- Anti-terrorist Center under the President of the CRI - In May 1997, the Anti-Terrorist Center was created under the President of the CRI, headed by the field commander Khunkar-Pasha Israpilov.

== See also ==
- Caucasus Emirate
- Caucasian Front (militant group)
- Chechen volunteers on the side of Ukraine
  - Dzhokhar Dudayev Battalion
- State Defense Council

== Publications ==
- Владислав Морозов. «Одинокие волки». ВВС Чеченской Республики Ичкерия в 1992-1994 гг. / Морозов В.Ю. // Авиация и Время : наук.- попул. авіац. журн. України/ ВЦ "АероХобі"; голов. ред. О. М. Ларіонов. - Київ : АероХобі, 2013. – 1 (132). – С. 40-44. ISSN 2304-1501
- Владислав Морозов. У страха глаза велики (ВВС Чеченской Республики Ичкерия в 1992-1994 гг.) / Морозов В.Ю. // М-Хобби : журнал любителей масштабного моделизма и военной техники. – М.: Цейхауз, 2013. – 3 (142). – С. 38-41. ISSN 0236-0586
