= Magomed Tushayev =

Chechen Russian major general

- Магомед Тушаев
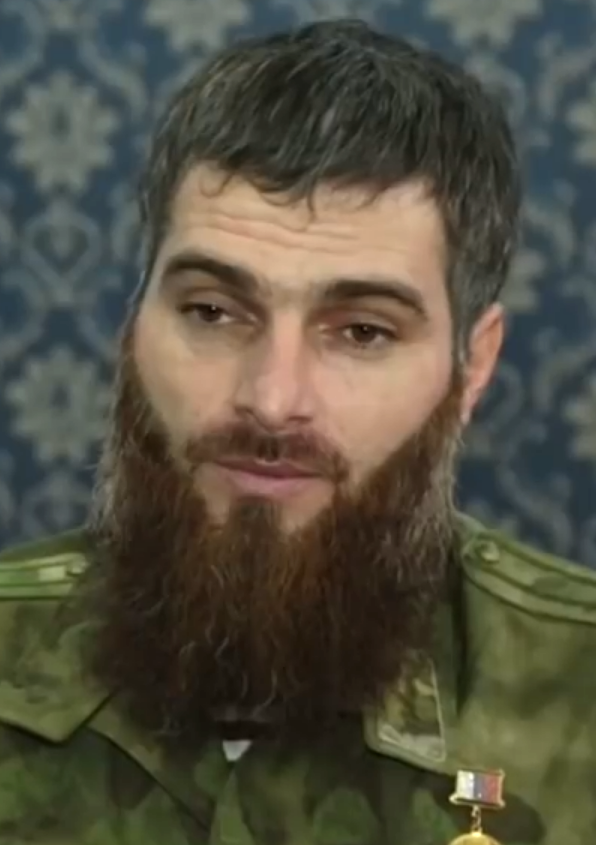
- Tushayev in 2020
- Born: 23 February 1986 (age 40); Sernovodskoye, Checheno-Ingush ASSR, Russian SFSR, Soviet Union
- Military career
- Allegiance: Russia
- Service years: 2008-present
- Rank: Colonel
- Commands: 141st Special Motorized Regiment; 96th Operational Regiment
- Conflicts: Russian Invasion of Ukraine

Magomed Salaudinovich Tushayev (Russian: Магомед Салаудинович Тушаев; born 23 February 1986) is a Russian Colonel and advisor to the Head of the Chechen Republic. He was a commander of the 141st Special Motorized Regiment.

Tushayev is part of a group who terrorized LGBT people in Chechnya. This included the kidnapping and torture of dozens of men who were suspected to be gay. These acts have been called Chechnya's "anti-gay purge".

In 2022, he was claimed to have been killed during the Russian invasion of Ukraine. However, posterior footage disputed this and showed that Tushayev was still alive.

== Biography ==
Tushayev is an only child, and he was interested in the military since he was a child, being fascinated by the theme of military uniforms. After graduating from the school in Sernovodskoye in Chechnya, he studied finance and law in Makhachkala, Dagestan. In 2008, Tushayev joined the OMON, a special police unit within the National Guard of Russia. He later became a riot police officer in Chechnya, and was later transferred to the SOBR, another special unit. Tushayev was later made deputy head of the department of SOBR.

In 2017, Tushayev became the commander of the 141st Special Motorized Regiment, one of the elite units of Russia, and started serving as commander in April 2018.

In 2019, he was promoted to the rank of major. In 2021, Tushayev took part in tests at the training center of the National Guard of Russia in Stavropol Krai. After positive results, he obtained the right to wear a red beret, which is the highest distinction for special forces soldiers.

== Human rights abuses ==
Tushayev is a close confidant of Ramzan Kadyrov, the Head of the Chechen Republic, and one of Kadyrov's three senior advisers. Tushayev was personally congratulated by Kadyrov on his 34th birthday. Tushayev was also one of the key executors of the anti-gay purges in Chechnya. According to the Daily Mirror, citing news from a Russian human rights organization, Tushayev was part of a group who terrorized LGBT people in Chechnya. This included the kidnapping, torture, and extrajudicial killing of dozens of men who were suspected to be gay. Tushayev also kidnapped gay human rights activist Ibrahim Selimkhanov in Moscow in May 2021 to Grozny to interrogate him about Chechen LGBT people. LGBT activists filed a complaint about the kidnapping of Selimkhanov to the Russian Federal Investigative Committee of the Russian Ministry of Justice, but officials refused to take further action.

== Russian invasion of Ukraine and claimed death ==
In the first half of February 2022, he was the commander of the 141st Special Motorized Regiment as a major. According to Interfax-Ukraine, Tushayev died during hostilities during the Russian invasion of Ukraine near Hostomel, where a battle was taking place in which Ukrainian troops defeated a Chechen national guard special unit. Ukraine claimed that Tushayev led a special mobile group into Ukraine during the Russian invasion of Ukraine to behead a Ukrainian dignitary, but that he was killed on 26 February in an exchange of fire with Ukrainian Alpha Group forces at Antonov Airport. It was claimed that the Chechen special forces and 56 tank columns led by Tushayev were all annihilated and captured by the Alpha Group. The death of Tushayev was claimed by both the Ukrainian president's government and Ukrainian media.

Following the claim of Tushayev's death, Kadyrov in the following days denied the information that he had been killed and assured that the soldier was alive. Kadyrov released a video in which he claimed to speak by telephone with Tushayev. Videos were then published on social media denying the reports of Tushayev's death. A Chechen-based media outlet posted a video of Tushayev himself denying his death on 16 March. The amateur film shown as evidence does not allow to unequivocally verify neither the identity of the man claiming to be Tushayev nor the date of the recording itself. According to Libération, Tushayev's death was still not confirmed as of 24 March 2022. BBC News Russian later confirmed that he was still alive.

In many media reports from that time, Tushayev was titled as a general. Later, in the message of Telegraf.com.ua, unlike other Russian generals killed, Tushyev was referred to as a general of the Rosgvard (Federal Service of the Russian National Guard Troops). On March 16, 2022, he was also mentioned as a general in a statement by the Ukrainian National Security and Defense Council on Russian generals killed by the Ukrainian side since the beginning of the invasion, of which he was the first reported to be killed.

As of 2023 he is the 96th Regiment's commander.

On February 22, 2024, he was promoted to the rank of colonel.

== Decorations ==
Tushayev has received numerous decorations, including:

- Medal "For Courage"
- Order of Courage
- Order "Akhmat Kadyrov"
- Medal of the Order "For Merit to the Fatherland" 2nd class with swords
- "Excellence in Policing" badge "for contribution to the fight against terrorism".
- Hero of the Chechen Republic

== See also ==
- List of Russian generals killed during the Russian invasion of Ukraine
- Chechen involvement in the Russian invasion of Ukraine
