= Chechen volunteers on the side of Ukraine =

- Flag of the Chechen Republic of Ichkeria
- Active: 2014–present
- Country: Ukraine
- Allegiance: Ministry of Defence of the CHRI abroad; Armed Forces of Ukraine; International Legion of Territorial Defence of Ukraine; Ukrainian Volunteer Army
- Type: Armed formation
- Role: Positional, sabotage and reconnaissance, guerrilla warfare
- Size: 2,000 people as of November 2022
- Part of: Dzhokhar Dudayev Battalion; Sheikh Mansur Battalion; Separate Special Purpose Battalion; Khamzat Gelayev Detachment; Special Operations Group ("SOG", Special Operation Group); 34th Assault Battalion "Mad Pack"; Krym Battalion; Muslim Corps "Caucasus"
- Motto: Freedom or Death ("Marşo ya joƶalla")
- Colors: Ukraine; Chechen Republic of Ichkeria
- Engagements: Russo-Ukrainian War: War in Donbas (2014–2022); Battle of Debaltseve; Battle of Ilovaisk; Shyrokyne standoff; Russian invasion of Ukraine; Northern Ukraine campaign; Battle of Kyiv (2022); Eastern Ukraine campaign; Battle of Kharkiv (2022); Battle of Donbas (2022–present); Siege of Mariupol; Battle of Izium (2022); Battle of Sievierodonetsk (2022); Battle of Bakhmut; Battle of Soledar; Southern Ukraine campaign; 2022 Kherson counteroffensive; Attacks in Russia during the Russian invasion of Ukraine; 2023 Belgorod Oblast incursions; 2023 Ukrainian counteroffensive

Commanders
- Current commander: Akhmed Zakayev (PM of the ChRI); Rustam Azhiev (Deputy commander of ChRI Armed Forces); Muslim Cheberloevsky (Head of BshM); Adam Osmayev (Head of DDB); Khadzhi-Murad Zumso (Head of OBON)
- Notable commanders: Isa Munayev †

Chechen volunteers on the side of Ukraine are armed Chechen volunteers and other formations fighting on the side of Ukraine in the Russo-Ukrainian war. These formations have been fighting on the side of Ukraine since the start of the conflict in 2014. The Chechen forces position themselves as the Armed Forces of the Chechen Republic of Ichkeria.

== History ==
=== War in Donbas (2014–2022) ===
In 2014, there were initial reports of Chechen volunteers who joined Ukraine's side to fight in the Donbas region. Chechens from various European countries and Turkey traveled to Ukraine to support the country, forming two battalions named after national heroes of Chechnya. One of the battalions was named after Dzhokhar Dudayev, the first president of the Chechen Republic of Ichkeria. The other battalion was named after Sheikh Mansur, an 18th-century Chechen military commander and Islamic leader who resisted the Russian imperialist expansion into the Caucasus. These battalions were led by Muslim Cheberloevsky (Umkhan Avtaev) and Isa Munaev, both of whom had participated in the two Russian-Chechen wars.

Isa Munayev was killed in action on January 31, 2015, from a shell explosion in the Battle for Debaltseve. After his death, Adam Osmayev, previously accused of attempting to assassinate Russian President Vladimir Putin, became the battalion commander.

=== Russo-Ukrainian War ===
Amid Russia's invasion of Ukraine, a congress of the Chechen diaspora in Europe was held in Brussels on February 24 to support Ukraine, organized by the State Committee for the De-occupation of the Chechen Republic of Ichkeria led by Akhmed Zakayev, who also heads the Chechen Republic of Ichkeria's government in exile. The congress was attended by leaders of Chechen socio-political organizations, media activists, ex-commanders of the Armed Forces of the Chechen Republic of Ichkeria, war veterans, and other individuals. They decided to form additional Chechen combat units to provide military support to Ukraine in repelling Russian aggression, in addition to the two Chechen battalions already operating in the Donbass region since 2014.

On February 26, 2022, Akhmed Zakayev stated that many of the 300,000 Chechens living in Europe expressed their desire and readiness to fight for Ukraine. He also mentioned that among those willing to go to Ukraine, there were many who had long-term experience in fighting against Russian troops in Chechnya. Several Chechen politicians and supporters of the ChRI living abroad, including Dzhambulat Suleymanov, Musa Lomaev, Anzor Maskhadov, Hussein Iskhanov, Khasan Khalitov, Akhyad Idigov, Musa Taipov, and Mansur Sadulaev, also supported Ukraine and participated in media coverage of the conflict. In May 2022, Maskhadov and Suleimanov visited Ukraine on a diplomatic mission and held meetings with Ukrainian politicians, journalists, and Chechen volunteers from the Sheikh Mansur battalion.

=== Persecution by Ukraine and Russia ===
In 2021, the Ukrainian Government imposed sanctions against fighters from the battalion.

In 2018, Timur Tumgoev, a veteran of the Donbas war and member of the battalion, was extradited to Russia. According to several reports he was tortured and sentenced to 16 years in prison. Several fighters are still threatened with extradition, such as Akhmed Ilaev and Ali Bakaev. These extraditions and sanctions have been criticized by several Ukrainian commanders such as Dmytro Yarosh, who blamed the Russian FSB and elements within the Ukrainian government.

"I believe that the Kremlin agents, which are infiltrated into Ukrainian power structures and authorities, are conducting a special operation to destabilize the situation within the state, with the aim of further expanding aggression and a full-scale invasion of Ukraine. That is why the Kremlin agents put thieves, bandits, anti-Ukrainian elements. People who, side by side with us, have walked the military path since 2014, defending our freedom and independence. I warn the authorities: we, our Chechen Brothers, will not be betrayed by the enemy. If it is necessary to use force to protect them, we will do it."

— Dmytro Yarosh, Censor.net

== Composition ==
Armed formations on the side of Ukraine that includes natives of Chechnya and members of the Chechen diaspora abroad:

- Dzhokhar Dudayev Chechen Peacekeeping Battalion
- Sheikh Mansur Chechen Peacekeeping Battalion
- Separate Special Purpose Battalion "OBON" of the Armed Forces of the Chechen Republic of Ichkeria
- Khamzat Gelayev Detachment
- Special Operations Group ("SOG", Special Operation Group) is a group of Chechen volunteers with extensive combat experience. A very secret unit within the Armed Forces of Ukraine.
- 34th Assault Battalion "Mad Pack"
- Krym Battalion
- Muslim Corps "Caucasus"

== Motivation ==
According to commanders of the Chechen forces, the main goal of their participation in the Russian-Ukrainian war is to continue the long-term national struggle for independence of the Chechen people with Russia and defend the freedom of Ukraine.

The deceased former commander of the Dzhokhar Dudayev Battalion, Isa Munayev had this to say regarding the question, "Why are you here?":

I am performing my duty. There exists such a concept of paying one's debts. When we were in a dire situation and were in need of help; the brotherly Ukrainians; the best sons of their people; came to my people, my motherland, the Chechen Republic of Ichkeria.

The position of Adam Osmayev regarding the conflict when asked in an interview "What does it mean to you what is happening in Ukraine?", answered the following:

This is just a continuation of the Chechen wars. We are fighting the same army, the same war criminals. The front, roughly speaking, has just moved 600 kilometers from the Chechen Republic. Our president, Dzhokhar Dudayev, predicted that Russia would be at war with Ukraine. We knew that it was possible, we are natural allies with Ukraine. Many of us are citizens of Ukraine. There are Chechens born here. There is freedom in Ukraine, which there is not in Russia... It is worth it to help Ukraine. But for us, this is a continuation of the war that began almost 30 years ago.

Commander of the Sheikh Mansur Battalion, Muslim Cheberloevsky, had this to say on why he's fighting for Ukraine.

There are many reasons for this, but in short: we have been fighting the Russians for centuries, for 400 years already.

== Number of volunteers ==
Musa Lomaev, a former representative of the ChRI government in Finland, has stated that many Chechens who participated in the second Russian-Chechen war and the civil war in Syria, as well as Chechen emigrants living outside of Chechnya, are continuing to flow to Ukraine as volunteers. He believes that their numbers will soon reach thousands.

In addition to the existing battalions and paramilitary formations of Chechen volunteers fighting in Ukraine, many Chechens are also serving in various parts of the Ukrainian army.

According to different sources, as of June 2022, up to 500 Chechen volunteers were fighting on the side of Ukraine. Anzor Maskhadov, the head of the "International Movement for the Liberation of Chechnya" organization, reported later that month that another group of 100 Chechen volunteers had recently left Europe for Ukraine.

The number of volunteers has since grown to a thousand people as of August 2022, and to 2,000 people as of November 2022.

== See also ==
- Russian invasion of Ukraine
- Ukrainian volunteer battalions
- Foreign fighters in the Russo-Ukrainian War
- International Legion of Territorial Defence of Ukraine
