= Guerrilla phase of the Second Chechen War =

Part of a Russian war in the Caucasus

The following lists detail the incidents of guerrilla warfare and counterinsurgency in the republic of Chechnya and the rest of the North Caucasus since the official end of the main Russian offensive by early May 2000. The lists are incomplete and the actual casualty count is much higher. Both Russian and separatist reports of casualties are often considered unreliable.
