= Ukrainian volunteer battalions =

Pro-Ukrainian militias during the war in Donbas (2014–2022)

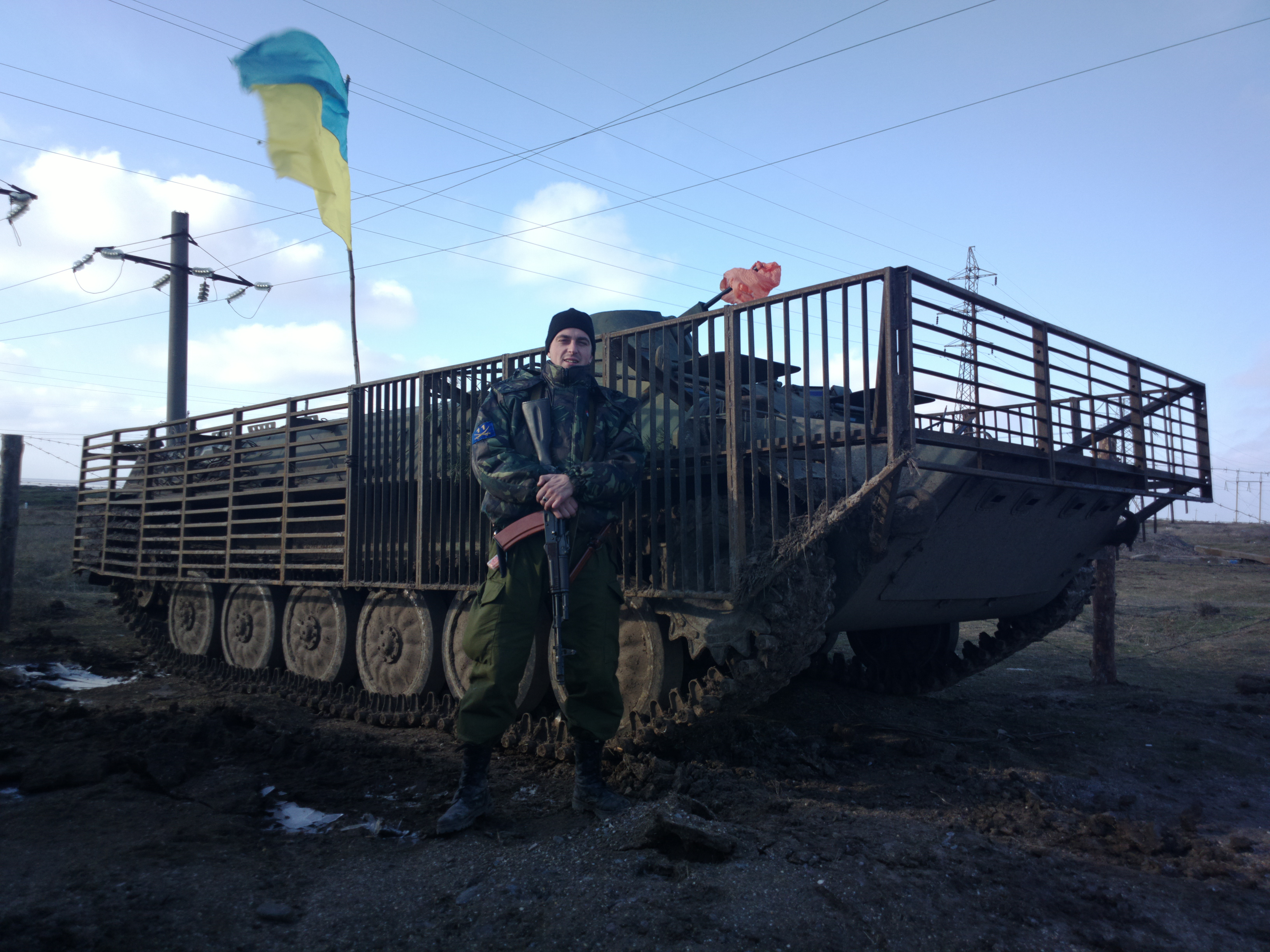
11th Territorial Defence Battalion "Kyivan Rus" fighter, 2014

Ukrainian volunteer battalions (Ukrainian: Добровольчі батальйони, romanized: Dobrovolchi bataliony, more formally Добровольчі військові формування України, Dobrovolchi viiskovi formuvannia Ukrainy, 'Volunteer military formations of Ukraine', or abbreviated Добробати, Dobrobaty) were militias and paramilitary formations mobilized as a response to the perceived state of weakness and unwillingness of the regular Armed Forces to counter rising separatism in spring 2014.

They trace their origins to the "Maidan Self-Defense" militias formed during the Euromaidan in 2013 to confront Yanukovych Government and the pro-Russian Anti-Maidan movement, and many of its first volunteers were activists or sympathizers of the Euromaidan movement. The earliest of these volunteer units were later formalized into military, special police and paramilitary formations in a response to the Russian military intervention in Ukraine in 2014. With the main Armed Forces in disaray, with poor equipment, organization and inept leadership, the volunteer battalions and the National Guard took the brunt of the fighting in the first months of the war. Most of the battalions initially didn't receive money from the government and were self-funded; some were backed by Ukrainian oligarchs while others received donations or started internet crowdfunding campaigns. Most of the formations were formed or placed under command of the Ministry of Internal Affairs — as "Special Tasks Patrol Police" — and Ministry of Defence — as "Territorial Defence Battalions". A minority of battalions were independent of state control.

As of September 2014, 37 volunteer battalions had taken an active part in the battles of the war in Donbas. Some of the battalion fighters are former Euromaidan activists, but their social background are highly diverse, including mostly students and military officers. Ideologically, they held a broad form of Ukrainian patriotism and opposition to separatism, with some specific units (such as the Ukrainian Volunteer Corps and Azov Regiment) holding radical far-right ideas. They enjoyed a high level of support in Ukrainian society, ranked second among the most respected institutions in the country. However, their close ties with oligarchs and some political organizations raised fears of the volunteer formations becoming politicized or turning into private armies. The Volunteer Battalions were also frequent target of Russian propaganda, characterized by Russian media as "fascist", "neo-nazi" or "Banderite" formations, and frequently accused of atrocities against civilians in the Donbas region. In 2023, a number of former volunteer battalions were designated as a terrorist organization by Russia.

Ordered to leave the front lines in 2015, the volunteer battalion phenomenon was largely over within a year of its beginning. Most units continued as fully integrated as units of either the Ukrainian Army or the National Guard of Ukraine.

== Volunteer formations ==
=== Ministry of Defence ===
Since spring 2014, Ministry of Defence had formed 32 volunteer battalions. The ones under the Ministry of Defence command were officially named the "Territorial Defence Battalions". At the end of 2014, territorial defence battalions were reorganized as motorized infantry battalions. The idea of the territorial defence battalions, however, remained and in 2021 the Territorial Defense Forces were later created as a more formal and structured version of the territorial defence battalions.

Besides territorial defence battalions, several regular units of Armed Forces of Ukraine were formed from volunteers, such as 3rd Airmobile Battalion "Phoenix" or 54th Reconnaissance Battalion "UNSO". In 2015 the 46th Spetsnaz Battalion "Donbas Ukraine" was created from volunteers of Donbas Battalion who decided to switch from National Guard of Ukraine to Armed Forces.

=== Ministry of Internal Affairs ===
According to Interior Minister Avakov, by mid-April 2016 205 service personnel of the ministry's volunteer battalions had been killed in action, National Guardsmen included.

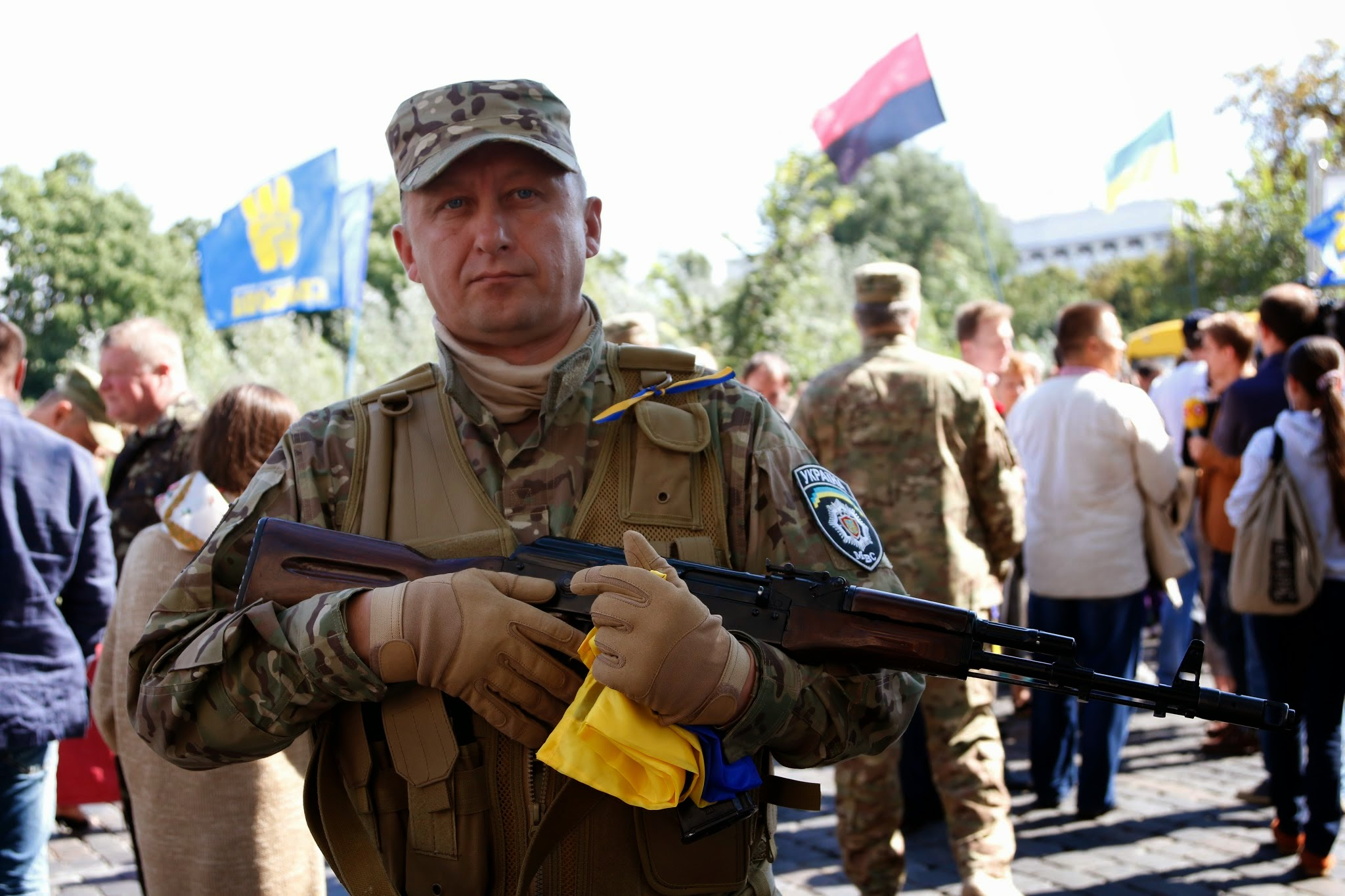
Volunteer of the "Sich" Special Tasks Patrol Police battalion in 2014.

==== Special Tasks Patrol Police ====
Ministry of Internal Affairs had established 56 special tasks patrol police units sized from company to battalion. After several reorganizations, this number shrunk to 33 units.

Notable Units formed between 2014 and 2015 include:

- Dnipro-1 Regiment
- Kharkiv Police Battalion
- Poltava Battalion
- Sich Battalion
- Svyatyi Mykolai Battalion

==== National Guard of Ukraine ====
The National Guard of Ukraine, subordinated to Ministry of Internal Affairs, had established several reserve battalions, among which were Donbas Battalion and General Kulchytskiy Battalion formed from volunteers and Maidan activists.

Notable Units formed between 2014 and 2015 include:

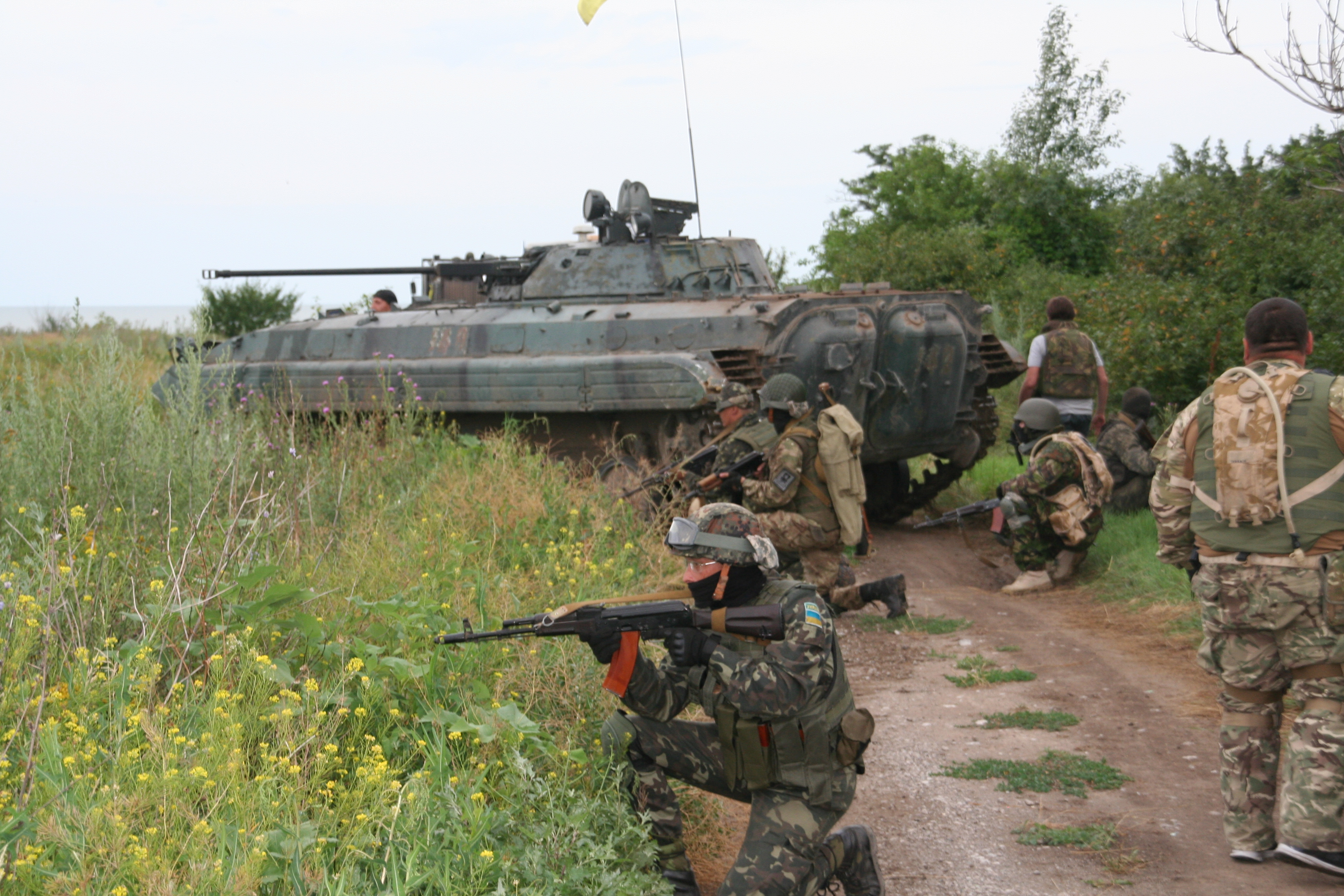
Soldiers of the Volunteer Battalion "Azov" in 2014.

- Serhii Kulchytskyi Battalion
- Azov Battalion
- Donbas Battalion

=== Independent battalions ===
The following battalions were not controlled by either the Ministry of Internal Affairs nor the Ministry of Defense, but independently operate.

==== Ukrainian Volunteer Corps ====
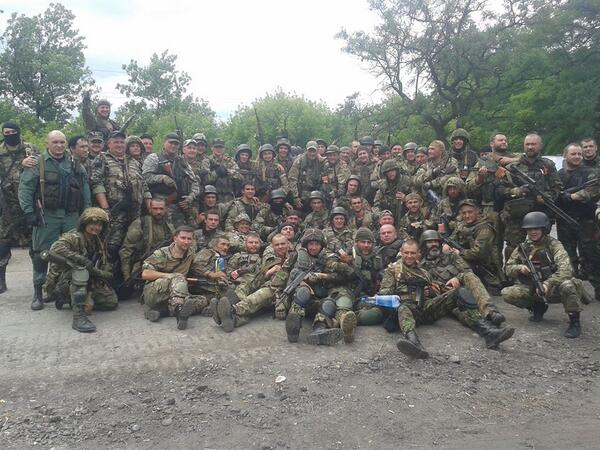
Ukrainian Volunteer Corps, 2014

Right Sector had formed several battalions that are known as Ukrainian Volunteer Corps. In spring 2015 there were attempts to integrate Ukrainian Volunteer Corps into the Ukrainian Army or National Guard.

==== Battalion OUN ====
Battalion of "Organization of Ukrainian Nationalists" was operating in the area of Pisky, Donetsk. The battalion was disbanded in September 2019; as one of the last units composed purely of volunteer soldiers.

==== Aerorozvidka ====
A unit specialized in aerial reconnaissance and drone warfare. Aerorozvidka was nicknamed a "war startup" by some observers, it began as a group of volunteer drone and IT enthusiasts. It used commercial drones to help the Ukrainian military forces. It was later integrated into the Ukrainian Ground Forces.

==== Noman Çelebicihan Battalion ====
The Noman Çelebicihan Battalion was one of the three reported battalions with majority Muslim membership. It was composed mostly of ethnic Crimean Tatars and was based in the Kherson region bordering Crimea. It did not participate in any combat operations. The battalion was formed and disbanded in 2016. Many of its members later joined other volunteer battalions or enlisted in the Ukrainian army. The battalion reportedly received assistance from Turkey.

=== Foreign fighters ===
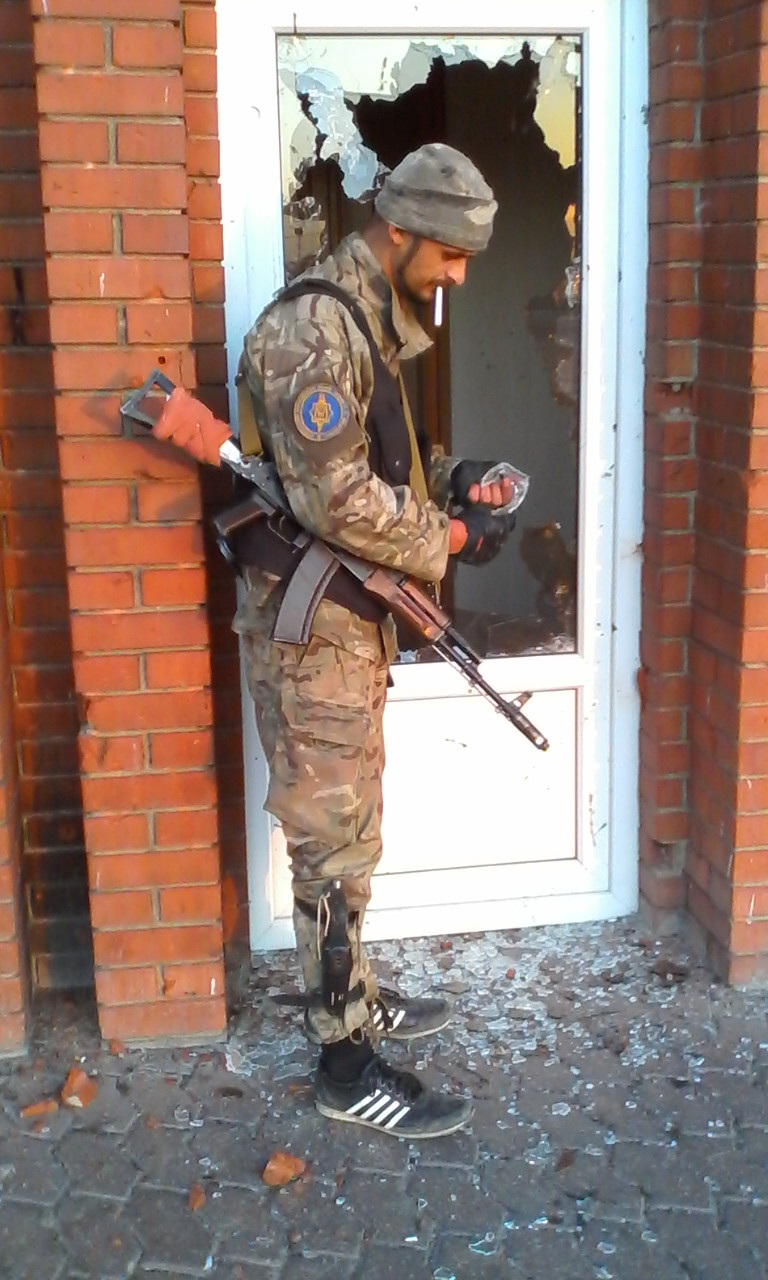
Member of the Kyiv Cossack Regiment "T. Shevchenko" Territorial Defence Battalion in 2014.

The foreign fighter movement in 2014 was largely short-lived, with researcher Kacper Rekawek writing, "fighters arrived throughout the summer of 2014, and most of them were gone from Ukraine at some point in 2015, although some returned later, with a small group settling in Ukraine permanently." By the end of 2015, Rekawek notes, "both sides took steps to professionalise their forces and incorporate the bottom-up organised volunteer battalions into e.g. the Ukrainian National Guard or, in the case of the 'separatists,' into the 'army corps.' This effectively meant an end to foreign fighter recruitment for this conflict and very few (new) foreigners joined either side after the end of 2015."

On 6 October 2014 the Ukrainian parliament voted to allow foreign fighters to join the Ukrainian military. That December, Ukrainian President Petro Poroshenko promised that foreign fighters who join the Ukrainian military will receive citizenship. However, the Kyiv Post reported that by October 2015, only one foreign fighter from Russia had been granted citizenship. The same month, 30 foreign fighters (from Belarus, Georgia, and Russia) rallied in Kyiv for Ukrainian citizenship.

An analysis of foreign fighters by Arkadiusz Legieć, a Senior Analyst at the Polish Institute of International Affairs, estimated that about 17,241 foreign fighters fought in Ukraine between 2014 and 2019. 3,879 of those foreign fighters supported Ukraine and joined foreign volunteer battalions. The largest group of foreign fighters in Ukraine was approximately 3,000 Russian citizen volunteers. The second-largest group consisted of approximately 300 Belarusians. The third-largest group consisted of approximately 120 Georgians. The only other country to exceed 50 foreign fighters was Croatia, with approximately 60 fighters. Other countries whose nationals supported Ukraine included Albania (15), Australia (5), Austria (35), Azerbaijan (20), Belgium (1), Bosnia and Herzegovina (5), Bulgaria (6), Canada (10), Czech Republic (5), Denmark (15), Estonia (10), Finland (15), France (15), Germany (15), Greece (2), Ireland (7), Israel (15), Italy (35), Latvia (8), Lithuania (15), Moldova (15), Kosovo (4), Netherlands (3), North Macedonia (4), Norway (10), Poland (10), Portugal (1), Romania (4), Serbia (6), Slovakia (8), Sweden (25), Thailand (3),Turkey (30), the United Kingdom (10), and the United States (15).

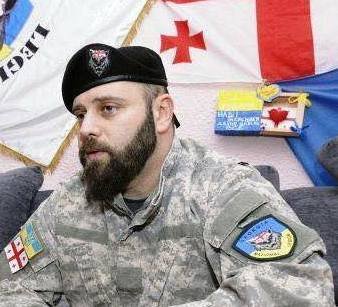
Mamuka Mamulashvili, the commander of the Georgian National Legion. Mamulashvili is Georgian national and a veteran of the Abkhazia War, First Chechen War and Russo-Georgian War who joined Ukraine at the outbreak of the Donbas war.

==== Georgian National Legion ====
The Georgian National Legion is a paramilitary unit formed of more than 700 soldiers, mostly ethnic Georgian volunteers fighting on the side of Ukraine in the war in Donbas and Russian invasion of Ukraine. The unit was organized in 2014 with the declared aim "to stand up to Russian aggression". The group is commanded by Mamuka Mamulashvili, a veteran Georgian officer. There are also members of Georgian national legion that had experience from the Chechen wars. After the start of Russian invasion of Ukraine more people of different nationalities applied to join Georgian National Legion. The GNL has been seen multiple times in news reports and interviews and can be seen as one of the more known Volunteer battalions.

==== Dzhokhar Dudayev battalion ====
The Dzhokhar Dudayev Battalion, originally named the "Chechen battalion", was set up in March 2014 and is one of several Chechen volunteer armed formations fighting on the side of Ukraine. It was later named after Chechnya's first president and leader Dzhokhar Dudayev. The battalion has been under the command of Adam Osmayev after Isa Munayev was killed in action during the Battle of Debaltseve. The battalion is made up mostly of Chechen volunteers, many of whom fought in the First and Second Chechen War. Members of the battalion view the war as part of a broader struggle against Russian imperialism and the Kadyrov regime. The battalion specializes in counter-subversion. Since the start of the 2022 Russian invasion of Ukraine, the battalion has participated in the defence of Kyiv and has taken part in numerous battles and offensives. Since November 2022, the battalion is involved in the Battle of Bakhmut.

==== Sheikh Mansur Battalion ====
The Sheikh Mansur Battalion is one of several Chechen volunteer armed formations fighting on the side of Ukraine. It is named after an 18th-century Chechen leader who fought against the Russian expansion into the Caucasus. Following its establishment in 2014, it has been involved in the Donbas war. It was reported to be defending the front line near Mariupol in 2015. Despite its staunch pro-Ukrainian stance, the battalion suffered sanctions from the Ukrainian government (with some members being extradited to Russia), and as a result, the battalion was disbanded in September 2019; as one of the last units composed purely of volunteer soldiers. However, during the 2022 Russian invasion of Ukraine, the battalion was reported to be active again. Since then, the battalion has been fighting in numerous major battles such as the Battle of Kyiv, Battle of Mariupol and Battle of Sievierodonetsk. The battalion has been involved in intense battles in the Battle of Bakhmut and Battle of Soledar since November 2022.

==== Separate Special-Purpose Battalion ====
The Separate Special-Purpose Battalion (OBON) of the Ministry of Defense of the Chechen Republic of Ichkeria is one of several Chechen volunteer armed formations fighting on the side of the Armed Forces of Ukraine. It is functioning as part of the Foreign Legion of Territorial Defense of Ukraine. It was created by Akhmed Zakayev on July 31, 2022, on the basis of a Chechen formation that has been fighting on the side of the Armed Forces of Ukraine since Russia's full-scale invasion of Ukraine.

== Similar later formations ==
=== Tactical Group "Belarus" ===
Tactical Group "Belarus" is a volunteer group of Belarusian nationals who were part of the Ukrainian volunteer battalions.

=== Territorial Defense Forces ===
In 2022, the former Territorial defence battalions were reorganized into a more formal and structured independent branch of the armed forces known as the Territorial Defense Forces. They serve as a spiritual successor of the volunteer battalions, allowing local civilian volunteers to join and do local territorial defense against an invasion.

=== International Legion of Territorial Defense of Ukraine ===
Following the 2022 invasion of Ukraine by forces of the Russian Federation, Ukrainian president Volodymyr Zelenskyy urged foreign volunteers to travel to Ukrainian embassies across the world to join a new 'International Brigade' of the Ukrainian armed forces.

=== Freedom of Russia Legion ===
Freedom of Russia Legion was formed following the 2022 invasion, which made up of defectors of the Russian armed forces. The legion also reportedly consists of volunteers from the Russian opposition.

=== Ukrainian Legion (Poland) ===
In 2024, as part of an effort to recruit abroad citizens of Ukraine, the Polish and Ukrainian government established a scheme to enroll Ukrainians in Poland into a new voluntary military formation called "Ukrainian Legion", recruited and deployed by Ukraine, equipped and trained by Poland and Western partners. Thousands of Ukrainians have reportedly registered already.

== Sources ==
- Rosaria Puglisi, Heroes or Villains? Volunteer Battalions in Post-Maidan Ukraine // Istituto Affari Internazionali, March 2015
- Margaret Klein, Briefing No. 27 .pdf Ukraine’s volunteer battalions – advantages and challenge // Swedish Defence Research Agency, April 2015
- Ilmari Käihkö, A nation-in-the-making, in arms: control of force, strategy and the Ukrainian Volunteer Battalions, Defence Studies, Volume 18 Issue 2, 2018, pp. 147–166.
- Ilmari Käihkö, The War Between People in Ukraine, The War on the Rocks, 21 March 2018
