= Rustam Azhiev =

Deputy commander-in-chief of the Chechen battalion OBON

- Born: 12 April 1981 (age 45); Grozny, Checheno-Ingush Autonomous Soviet Socialist Republic
- Military career
- Allegiance: Chechen Republic of Ichkeria (2000–2007; 2022–present); Caucasus Emirate (2007–2009)
- Service years: 2000 – present
- Units: Vilayat Nokhchicho (2007–2009); Ajnad al-Kavkaz (2015–2022): Jamaat al-Khilafa al-Qawqazia (2013–2015); Ukrainian Foreign Legion: Separate Special Purpose Battalion (2022–present)
- Commands: Commander-in-Chief of the Armed Forces of the Chechen Republic of Ichkeria
- Conflicts: Second Chechen War; Syrian civil war; Russo-Ukrainian War; Russian invasion of Ukraine; Battle of Bakhmut; Belgorod Oblast Incursions; Western Russia Incursion

Rustam Magomedovich Azhiev (Chechen: Мохмад ВоӀ Рустам, romanized: Moxmad Vo' Rustam) also known by the pseudonym Abdul Hakim al-Shishani (Arabic: عبد الحكيم الشيشاني) is commander-in-chief of the Chechen battalion OBON (part of the Ichkerian armed forces-in-exile) fighting on the Ukrainian side in the Russo-Ukrainian war. Azhiev is a veteran of the Second Russo-Chechen war and fought on the side of the opposition in the Syrian civil war as one of the Chechen mujahideen in Syria. In the latter he was the leader of the rebel group Ajnad al-Kavkaz.

== Early life and family ==
Rustam Azhiev was born in Prigorodnoye, a village in the outskirts of Grozny, capital of the Checheno-Ingush ASSR and the capital of Chechnya today, in April 1981 and belongs to the Mulkoy teip. After finishing school he enrolled in the pedagogical university of Grozny, but had to stop his studies due to the outbreak of the Second Russo-Chechen war. During his youth he was master of sports in freestyle wrestling and won multiple competitions in the south of Russia. His brothers Anzor and Mansur are professional MMA fighters.

== Second Russo-Chechen war ==
Shortly after Vladimir Putin had ordered the second invasion of Chechnya in 1999, Azhiev joined the Ichkerian forces and fought under the command of Rustam Basaev, who would later become the commander of the Central Sector of the Armed Forces of the Chechen Republic of Ichkeria. In the course of the war Azhiev rose up in ranks and was appointed commander of the central sector of the Caucasus Emirate's Vilayat Nokhchicho in 2007. Two years later he was seriously wounded, losing 3 fingers and injuring his eyes. To get medical treatment he decided to move to Turkey. Following his treatment he was unable to return to Chechnya to continue fighting.

== Syrian civil war ==
After several unsuccessful attempts to return to Chechnya, Azhiev decided in 2013 "to continue (...) resistance against Russia in the Syrian Republic". He joined the Syrian Civil war on the side of the Islamist rebel group Ansar al-Sham. The following year he and other Chechen comrades left the group and founded an independent group, Ajnad al-Kavkaz. The group was mainly active in Northwestern Syria and participated in many battles, such as the Idlib offensive in 2015 and Hama offensive in 2016. Throughout the war the group remained completely independent under Azhievs leadership and did not swear allegiance to any other groups. Due to internal conflicts among the Syrian opposition, Azhiev decided to withdraw from the conflict in October 2017. In the following years Tahrir al-Sham started to crack down on foreign fighters and groups, especially of Chechen origin, and arrested leaders close to the group. After settling once again in Turkey, he found himself targeted by a small hit squad who were ordered to assassinate their primary target, "a Chechen dissident living in Turkey named ‘Abdulhakim, who had fought for the opposition in Syria" according to the Turkish intelligence agency MİT, who were able to arrest the assassins before they could carry out their mission, which they believe was ordered by FSB and the pro-Moscow Chechen president, Ramzan Kadyrov.

== Russian invasion of Ukraine ==
Reports of Azhiev's decision to join the fight against Russia in Ukraine first appeared in March 2022 and were confirmed in October, when the prime minister of the government-in-exile of the Chechen Republic Ichkeria, Akhmed Zakayev, appointed him as deputy commander-in-chief of the armed Ichkerian forces. Footage of Azhiev fighting on the front lines in the Battle of Bakhmut appeared in January 2023.
