= Separate Special Purpose Battalion =

Anti-Russian Chechen volunteer unit

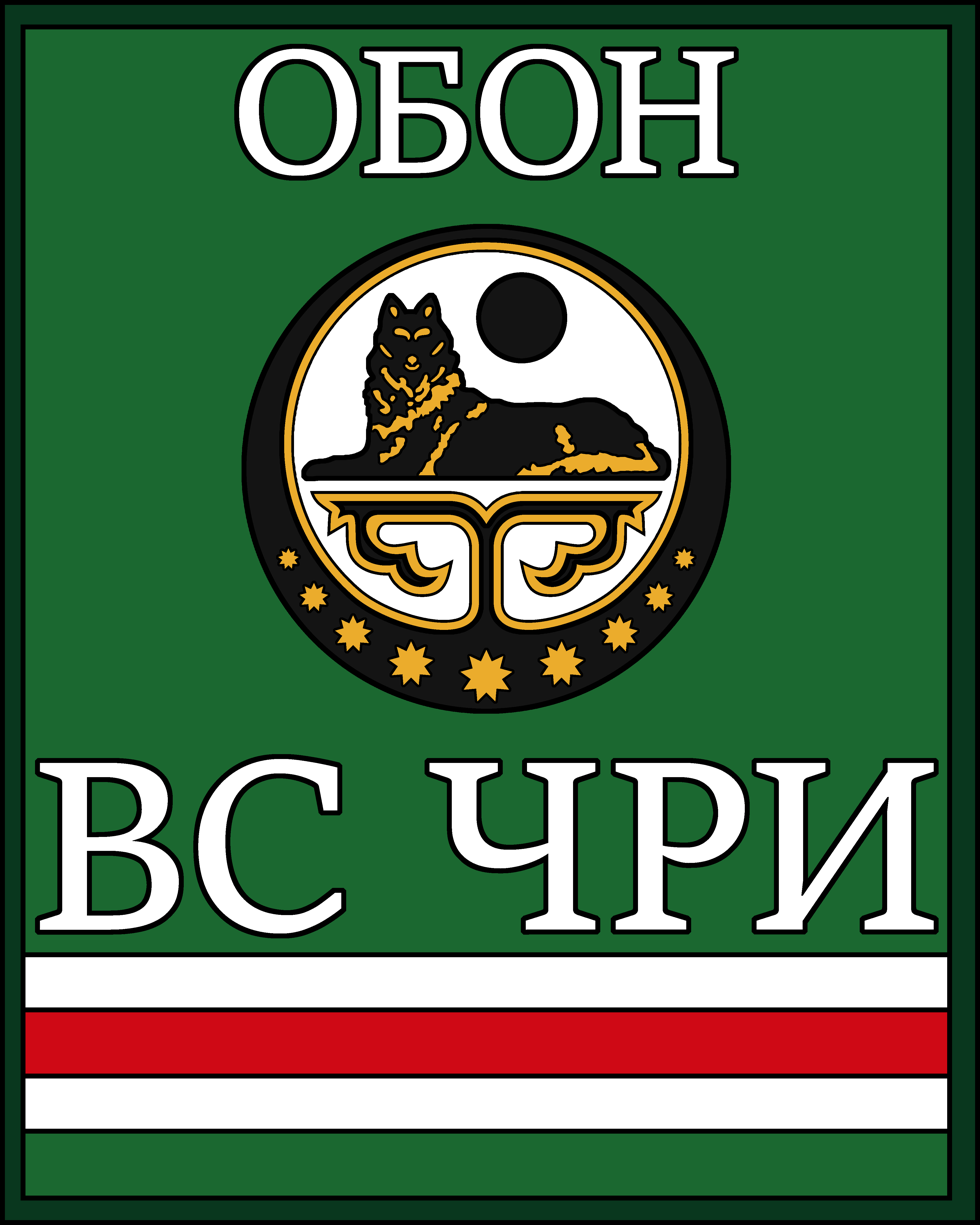
- chevron of the Separate Special Purpose Battalion
- Founded: July 2022
- Country: Ukraine
- Allegiance: Ministry of Defence (Ukraine); Chechen Republic of Ichkeria
- Type: Spetsnaz
- Size: Battalion
- Part of: International Legion of Territorial Defense of Ukraine
- Nickname: OBON
- Motto: Marşo ya joƶalla ("Freedom or Death")
- Colors: Ukraine; Chechen Republic of Ichkeria
- Engagements: Battle of Donbas (2022); 2022 Ukrainian southern counteroffensive Eastern Ukraine campaign: Battle of Bakhmut; 2023 Belgorod Oblast incursions; March 2024 Western Russia incursion

Commanders
- Current commander: Hadzji-Murad Zumso; Khavazhi Amaev X

The Separate Special Purpose Battalion of the Ministry of Defense of the Chechen Republic of Ichkeria (Russian: Отдельный батальон особого назначения Вооружённых сил Чеченской Республики Ичкерия, romanized: Otdel'nyy batal'on osobogo naznacheniya Vooruzhonnykh sil Chechenskoy Respubliki Ichkeriya), also known as OBON (Russian: ОБОН), is a spetsnaz formation of Chechen volunteers, functioning as part of the International Legion of Territorial Defense of Ukraine. It is one of several Chechen armed volunteer formations on the side of Ukraine. It was created by Akhmed Zakayev on July 29, 2022, on the basis of a Chechen formation that has been fighting on the side of the Ukrainian Armed Forces since Russia's full-scale invasion of Ukraine to combat the purposes of their common enemy.

== History ==
On July 29, 2022, at a meeting with the leaders of the Chechen volunteers in Kyiv, Akhmed Zakayev announced the creation of a new Chechen armed formation on the side of the Armed Forces of Ukraine.

This formation was named OBON (Separate Special Purpose Battalion) and included in the International Legion of Territorial Defense of Ukraine. According to Zakayev himself, as the battalion becomes bigger, it will be transformed into a "Separate Special Purpose Brigade" as part of the International Legion.

The unit is subordinate to the Ministry of Defense of the government of the Chechen Republic of Ichkeria abroad, headed by Akhmed Zakayev. It includes fighters from among the representatives of the Chechen nationality who serve in the Ukrainian army, as well as volunteers from the Chechen diaspora in Europe and abroad.

An officer of the Ukrainian army Khadzhi-Murat Zumsoevsky, who served for several years in the ranks of the Ukrainian Armed Forces, was appointed as the commander of the battalion. His deputy is Khavazhi Amaev, a participant in the Second Chechen War and Syrian Civil War.

=== Participation in the Russo-Ukrainian war ===
In early August 2022, the battalion took part in battles in the Donetsk region of Ukraine. In August–September 2022, the battalion has taken part in the Ukrainian counteroffensive of the southern regions. On May 13, 2023, a member of the battalion Hussein Dzhambetov defected to the Russian side. In September 2023, the unit is fighting on the Verbove-Novopokrovka front.

On September 26, 2024, the media outlet of the Chechen government in exile announced the formation of a new UAV unit to participate in drone warfare against the Russian Armed Forces, called “Stiglara Tajzar” (meaning “Heavenly Wrath” in Chechen).

== Structure ==
- Hadzji-Murad Zumso Group.
- Abdul-Hakim Shishani Group.
- Muslim Sadayev's Group.
- Khavazhi Amaev's Group.
- Stiglara Tajzar

== Commanders ==
- Rustam Azhiev – colonel of the CRI Armed Forces
- Hadji-Murad Zumso – Battalion commander
- Khavazhi Amaev – Deputy battalion commander. Murdered in Lviv 15 September 2026.
- Muslim Sadaev – Captain of the CRI Armed Forces

== See also ==
- Sheikh Mansur Battalion
- Dzhokhar Dudayev Battalion
