= Sheikh Mansur Battalion =

Anti-Russian Chechen volunteer unit

- Ukrainian: Чеченський миротворчий батальйон імені шейха Мансура
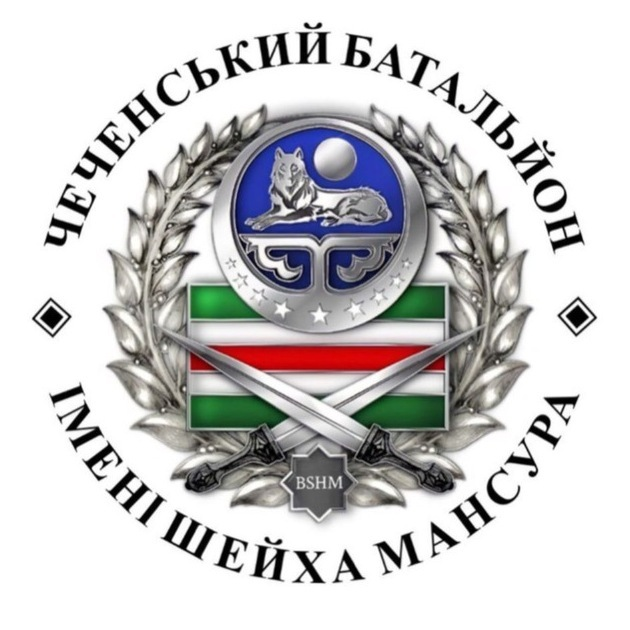
- Insignia of the Battalion
- Founded: 2014–2019 (initial formation); March 2022–present (reestablished)
- Country: Ukraine
- Allegiance: Ukraine
- Type: Light infantry
- Size: Battalion
- Patron: Sheikh Mansur
- Motto: Marşo ya joƶalla ("Freedom or Death")
- Engagements: War in Donbas; Shyrokyne standoff; Russian invasion of Ukraine; Northern Ukraine campaign; Battle of Kyiv; Eastern Ukraine campaign; Battle of Mariupol; Battle of Sievierodonetsk; Battle of Bakhmut; Battle of Soledar; Southern Ukraine campaign

Commanders
- Current commander: Muslim Cheberloevsky

Insignia
- Current patch insignia

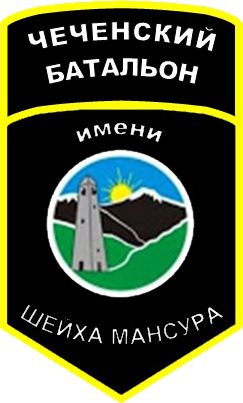
- Former patch insignia

The Sheikh Mansur Chechen Peacekeeping Battalion (Ukrainian: Чеченський миротворчий батальйон імені шейха Мансура, romanized: Chechenskyi myrotvorchyi batalion imeni sheikha Mansura) or simply the Sheikh Mansur Battalion is one of several Chechen volunteer armed formations participating in the Russian-Ukrainian war on the side of the Armed Forces of Ukraine. The battalion is named in honour of Sheikh Mansur, a Chechen military commander and an Islamic leader who fought against the expansion of the Russian Empire into the Caucasus during the late 18th century.

The battalion has been active since 2014 and is made up of mostly Chechen volunteers, many of whom are veterans of the First Chechen War and Second Chechen War.

== Creation ==
The battalion was founded in 2014, in Denmark. It was created by the Free Caucasus Organization, which was created in 2006 in Denmark by political emigrants from countries/regions in the Caucasus and in Europe. In October 2014, the Free Caucasus GPA Presidium announced the creation of a battalion named after Sheikh Mansur in order to participate in the war in eastern Ukraine commanded by Muslim Cheberloevsky (a veteran of the two Chechen-Russian wars).

The battalion was formed upon the splitting off of a faction from the Dudayev battalion, due to leaders deciding the need to act at two important fronts which at the time were Kramatorsk and Mariupol. It was the second Chechen battalion, after the previously formed Dzhokhar Dudayev battalion, which was proven itself well and received approval and support from the Ukrainian authorities.

For a time, the battalion operated under the command of the Ukrainian Volunteer Corps, an independent volunteer battalion of the far-right party Right Sector.

Sheikh Mansur's battalion is also distinguished by the decision for not being part of the International Legion and sign contracts with the Ukrainian army. The unit maintains itself and takes care of its own forces, soldiers do not receive salaries, supplies, and after the end of the war will not have any legal status as participants in hostilities. According to the units spokesperson, for the Chechen soldiers Ukraine's victory in the war will only be an intermediate step, the ultimate goal is to liberate their own homeland from Russian occupation. Although the core of the battalion consists of Chechens and Ukrainians, there are also Turkmen, Kartvels, Azerbaijanis and Uzbeks in the battalion.

== Structure ==
As of 2023 the battalion's structure is as follows:

- Sheikh Mansur Battalion
  - Aerial Reconnaissance Group BShM
  - 3rd Company "Makhno". A special group of the battalion with many ethnic Ukrainians. Commander Artur "Makhno" Pashkulyak was killed on 2 April 2023 during combat mission near Bakhmut.

== Participation in the Russo-Ukrainian War ==
The battalion has since 2014 participated in the war in Donbas. During the Shyrokyne standoff, the Sheikh Mansur battalion together with other Ukrainian forces fought against Russian-backed separatists in the village of Shyrokyne, east of Mariupol in 2015. The battalion handed in its weapons in September 2019 and was one of the last units composed purely of volunteer soldiers.

The battalion was reported to be active again during the 2022 Russian invasion of Ukraine. A video released by the battalion in March 2022 showing intense fighting against Russian forces outside of Kyiv confirmed the presence of the Sheikh Mansur battalion in Ukraine. The Sheikh Mansur Battalion as well as the Dzhokhar Dudayev Battalion held the defense near Kyiv and participated in partisan operations, ambushes, sabotage work and mining during the Battle of Kyiv. They had previously fought in the Battle of Mariupol, but they left for Kyiv as they deemed it was more important to defend the capital city.

After pushing Russian forces out of Kyiv, fighters of the battalion followed the Russian troops and fought in the Sumy Oblast during the Northern Ukraine campaign. Since then, the battalion has fought in the Donetsk and Luhansk Oblasts, most notably taking part during the Battle of Sievierodonetsk since at least June 2022. In July 2022, they declared an insurgency in Chechnya.

From September to November 2022, the battalion has been in battles with Russian forces on the Zaporizhzhian front.

The battalion has been fighting in the Battle of Bakhmut and Battle of Soledar since at least November 2022, which as of December 2022 is experiencing the scenes of intense fighting.

== Sanctions ==
The Ukrainian Government imposed sanctions against fighters from the battalion in 2021.

In 2018 Timur Tumgoev, a veteran of the Donbas war and member of the battalion was extradited to Russia. According to several reports he was tortured and sentenced to 16 years in prison. Several fighters are still threatened with extradition, such as Akhmed Ilaev and Ali Bakaev. These extraditions and sanctions have been criticized by several Ukrainian commanders such as Dmytro Yarosh, who blamed the Russian FSB and elements within the Ukrainian government.

"I believe that the Kremlin agents, which are infiltrated into Ukrainian power structures and authorities, are conducting a special operation to destabilize the situation within the state, with the aim of further expanding aggression and a full-scale invasion of Ukraine. That is why the Kremlin agents put thieves, bandits, anti-Ukrainian elements. People who, side by side with us, have walked the military path since 2014, defending our freedom and independence. I warn the authorities: we, our Chechen Brothers, will not be betrayed by the enemy. If it is necessary to use force to protect them, we will do it."

— Dmytro Yarosh, Censor.net

== Commanders ==
- Battalion Commander - Muslim Cheberloevsky
- Chief of Staff of the battalion - Muslim Idrisov

== See also ==
- Dzhokhar Dudayev Battalion
- Separate Special Purpose Battalion
