= Casualties of the Russo-Ukrainian war =

Casualties of ongoing conflict since 2014

The casualties in the Russo-Ukrainian war include six deaths during the 2014 annexation of Crimea by the Russian Federation, 14,200–14,400 military and civilian deaths during the war in Donbas, and between 1,274,000 and 2 million estimated casualties (killed and wounded) during the Russian invasion of Ukraine from 24 February 2022 to June 2026.

The War in Donbas's deadliest phase (pre-2022) occurred before the Minsk agreements, aimed at ceasefire and settlement. Despite varied reports on Ukrainian military casualties due to underreporting, official figures eventually tallied, indicating notable military and civilian casualties on both sides. The war also saw a large number of missing and captured individuals, and efforts to exchange prisoners between conflicting parties. Foreign fighters and civilian casualties added to the war's complexity, with international involvement and impacts extending beyond the immediate conflict zones.

Reports from Russian and Ukrainian sources relating to the full-scale Russian invasion of Ukraine are conflicting, but indicate high military and civilian casualties. Both foreign fighters and foreign civilian deaths have been reported. Efforts to identify and repatriate the deceased, alongside the treatment of prisoners of war, highlighted the human cost of the ongoing conflict.

== Russian annexation of Crimea (2014) ==
During the Russian annexation of Crimea from 23 February through 19 March 2014, six people were killed. The dead included three protesters, two Ukrainian soldiers and one Russian Cossack paramilitary. On 10 August 2016, Russia accused the Special Forces of Ukraine of conducting a raid near the Crimean town of Armiansk which killed two Russian servicemen. The government of Ukraine dismissed the report as a provocation. Ten people were forcibly disappeared between 2014 and 2016 and were still missing as of 2017.

== War in Donbas (2014–2022) ==
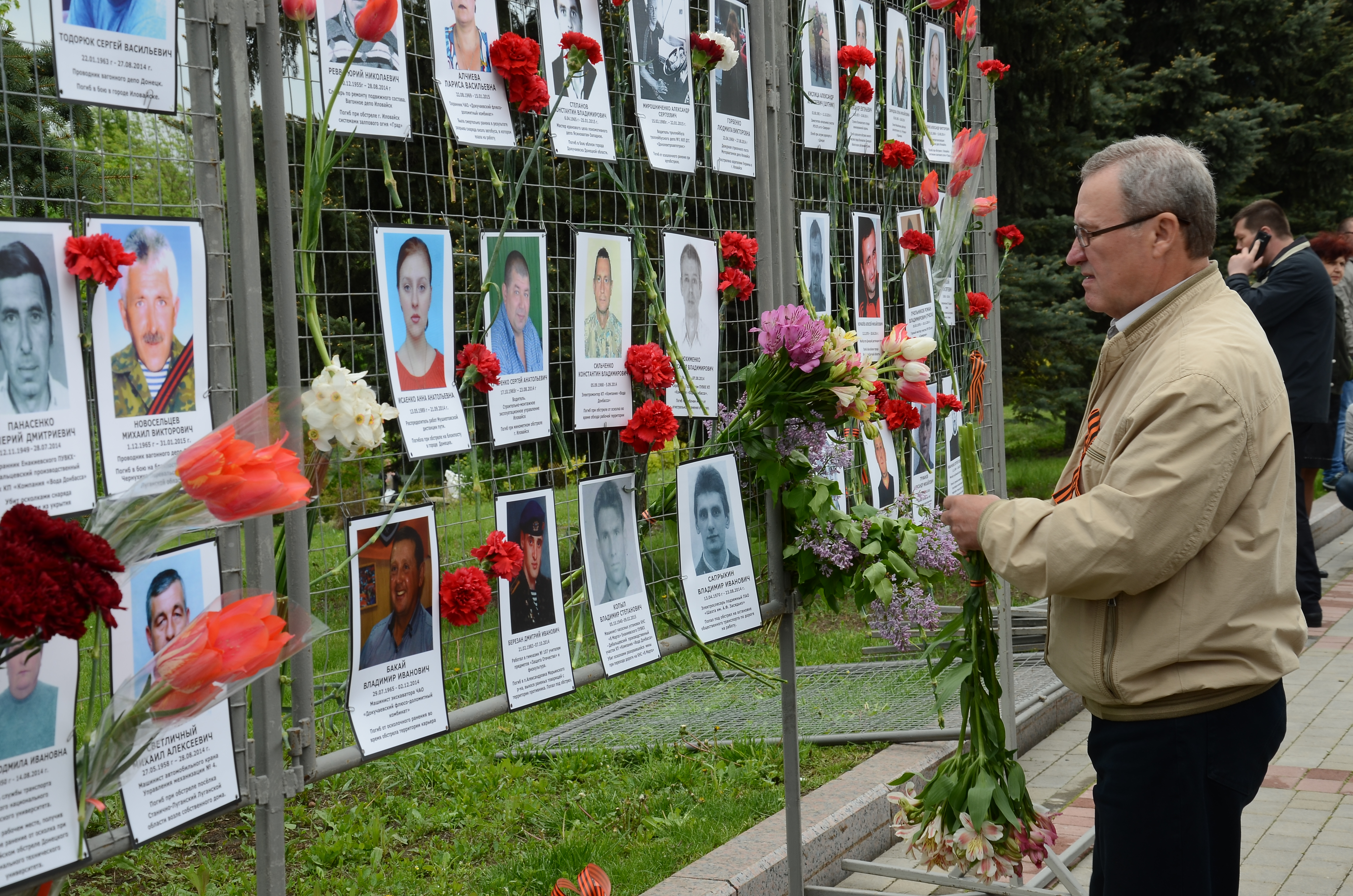
Civilian casualties of the war in Donbas

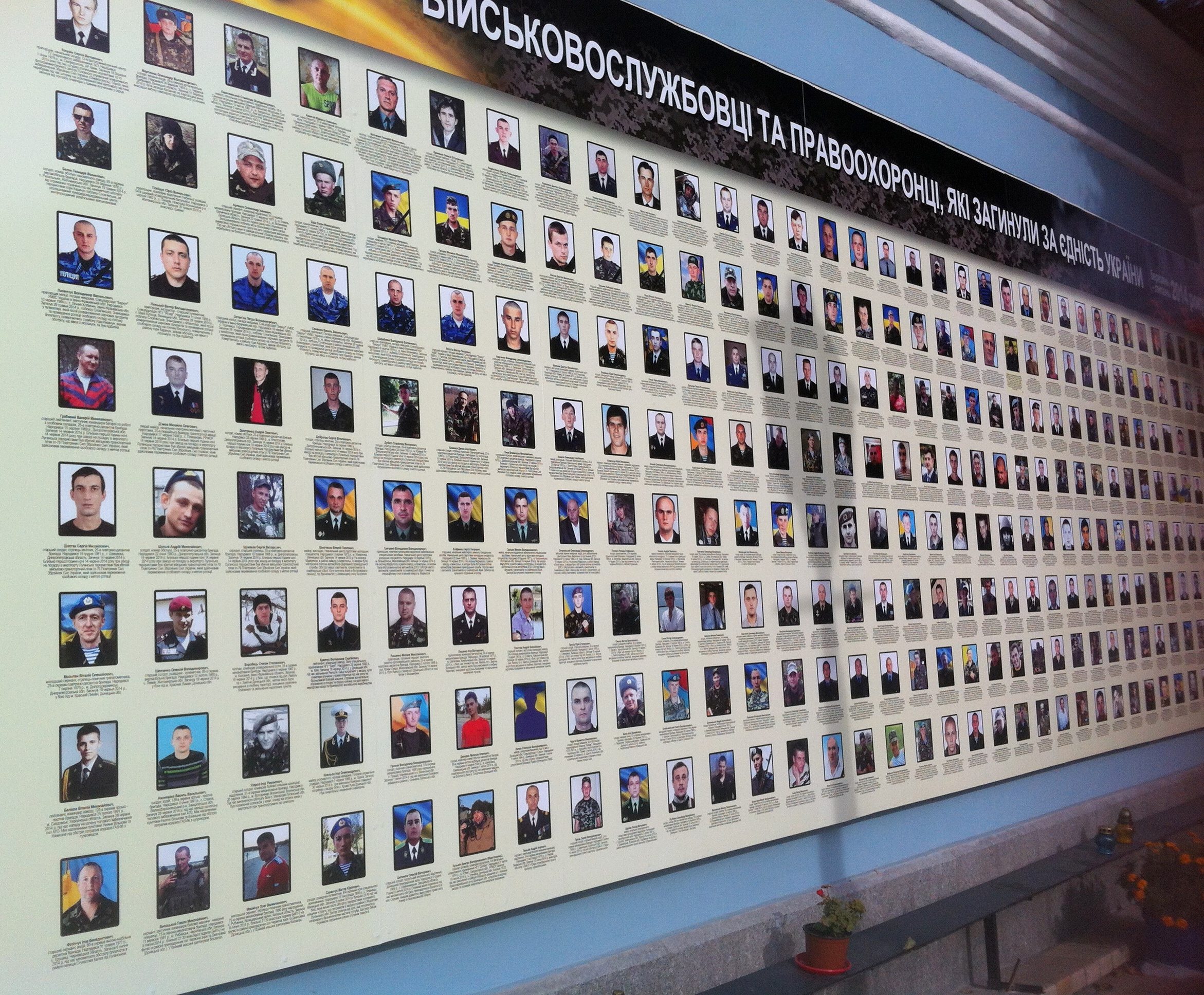
A mural of Ukrainian soldiers who died during the war in Donbas in 2014

The overall number of estimated deaths in the war in Donbas from 6 April 2014 to 31 December 2021 was 14,200–14,400. This included about 6,500 pro-Russian separatist fighters, 4,400 Ukrainian fighters, and 3,404 civilians. This number includes non-combat military deaths, as well as deaths from mines and unexploded ordnance. The vast majority of the deaths took place in the first year of the war, when major combat took place before the Minsk agreements.

=== Total deaths ===
Breakdown	Fatalities	Time period	Source
Total	14,200–14,400	6 April 2014 – 31 December 2021	United Nations
Civilians	3,404 (306 foreign)	6 April 2014 – 31 December 2021	United Nations
Ukrainian forces (AFU, NGU, SBGS and volunteer forces)	4,400	6 April 2014 – 31 December 2021	United Nations
Ukrainian forces (AFU, NGU, SBGS and volunteer forces)	4,535 (Note: The number of Ukrainian soldiers killed includes the deaths of two servicemen during the Annexation of Crimea by the Russian Federation.)	6 April 2014 – 23 February 2022	Museum of Military History
Ukrainian forces (AFU, NGU, SBGS and volunteer forces)	6,906	6 April 2014 – 23 February 2022 (Note: Despite the War in Donbas losses banner on the website reading 2014-2021, sorting by "date of death" on the website will show the names of soldiers who were killed up to 23 February 2022)	UALosses project
Pro-Russian forces (DPR and LPR forces)	6,500	6 April 2014 – 31 December 2021	United Nations
Pro-Russian forces (DPR and LPR forces)	17	1 Jan – 25 February 2022	DPR & LPR
Russian Armed Forces	400–500 (Note: The deaths of the Russian soldiers have not been confirmed by their government and have possibly been included in the toll of dead rebel fighters.)	6 April 2014 – 10 March 2015	US State Department

Initially, the known number of Ukrainian military casualties varied widely due to the Ukrainian Army drastically understating its casualties, as reported by medics, activists and soldiers on the ground, as well as at least one lawmaker. Several medical officials reported they were overstretched due to the drastic number of casualties. Eventually, the Ukrainian Defence Ministry stated that the numbers recorded by the National Museum of Military History were the official ones, although still incomplete, with 4,535 deaths cataloged by 23 February 2022.

According to the Armed Forces of Ukraine, 1,175 of the Ukrainian servicemen died due to non-combat causes by 5 March 2021. Subsequently, the military did not publish new figures on their non-combat losses, stating they could be considered a state secret.

=== Deaths by regions ===
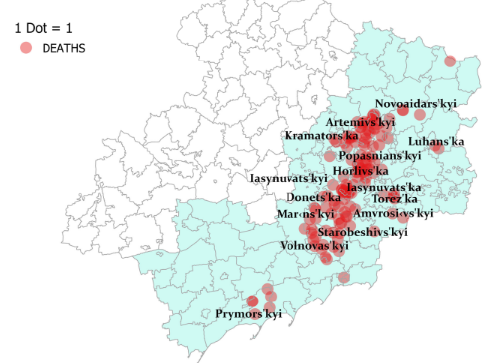
Deaths of Ukrainian soldiers in 2018.

The following table does not include the 298 deaths from the shootdown of Malaysia Airlines Flight 17 or the deaths of Ukrainian servicemen, which are listed separately.

Region	Fatalities	Time period	Source
Donetsk region	2,420 civilians and DPR fighters	6 April 2014 – 15 February 2015	OCHA
Donetsk region	4,374 civilians (per DPR) (Note: The Russian state TASS news agency reported that, according to Russia's Donetsk People's Republic (DPR), 9,512 civilians had been killed in the Donetsk region since 2014, including 4,778 killed since 17 February 2022, right before the start of the Russian invasion of Ukraine, leaving a total of 4,374 killed per the DPR since the start of the conflict in 2014 and up to 16 February 2022.)	6 April 2014 – 16 February 2022	DPR
Luhansk region	1,185 civilians and LPR fighters (Note: Out of the 1,185 civilians and militants killed in the Luhansk region by 15 February 2015, 456 were civilians who died by 29 October. In addition, 526 of the civilians and militants died in Luhansk city alone by 11 September, of which 300 were confirmed as civilians by 31 August.)	1 May 2014 – 15 February 2015	OCHA
Luhansk region	2,269 civilians	6 April 2014 – 23 February 2022	LPR

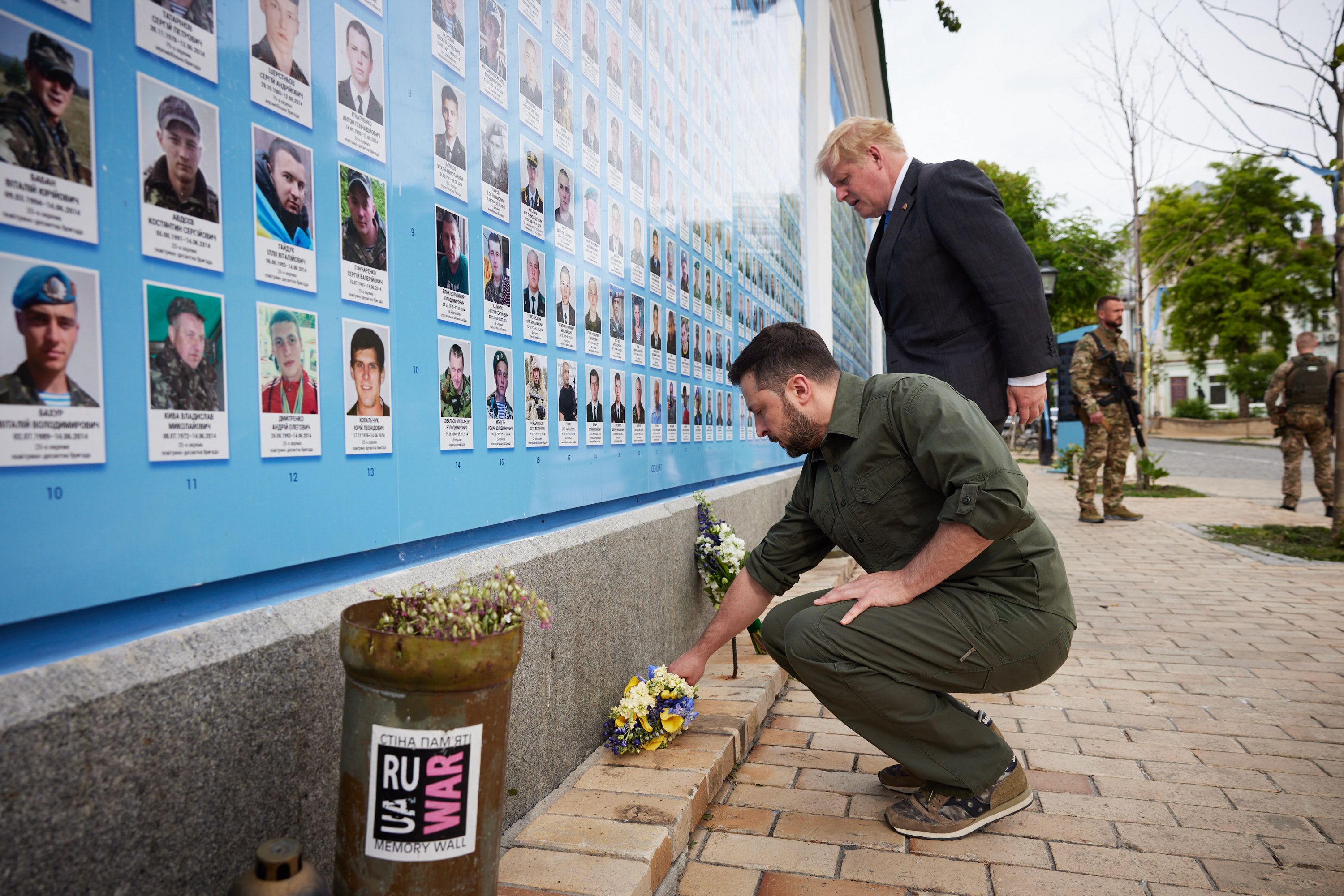
A wall of St. Michael's Golden-Domed Monastery in Kyiv has been transformed into a war memorial with the photos of thousands of Ukrainian soldiers who were killed during the war in Donbas

=== Missing and captured ===
By 15 May 2016, the Donetsk region's prosecutors reported 1,592 civilians had gone missing in government-controlled areas, of whom 208 had been located. At the same time, a report by the United Nations stated 1,331–1,460 people were missing, including at least 378 soldiers and 216 civilians. 345 unidentified bodies, of mostly soldiers, were also confirmed to be held at morgues in the Dnipropetrovsk Oblast or buried. In all, as of late October, 774 people were missing according to the government, including 271 soldiers. By the end of December 2017, the number of confirmed missing on the Ukrainian side was 402, including 123 soldiers. The separatists also reported 433 missing on their side by mid-December 2016, and 321 missing by mid-February 2022.

As of mid-March 2015, according to the Security Service of Ukraine (SBU), 1,553 separatists had been released from captivity during prisoner exchanges between the two sides. Subsequently, Ukraine released another 316 people by late February 2016, according to the DPR and other media reports, while by September, 1,598 security forces members and 1,484 civilians had been released by the rebels. 1,110 separatist fighters and supporters, including 743 civilians, were reportedly still being held by Ukrainian forces as of late March 2016, according to the DPR. They updated the figure of separatist prisoners to 816, including 287–646 civilians, in December. At the end of May 2015, the Ukrainian commander of Donetsk airport, Oleg Kuzminykh, who was captured during the battle for the complex, was released.

In December 2017, a large prisoner exchange took place where the rebels released 73 out of 176 prisoners they were holding, while Ukraine released 306 out of 380 of their prisoners. Out of those that were released by Ukraine, 29 brought to the exchange point refused to go back to separatist-held territory, while 40 who were already previously released did not show up for the exchange. Meanwhile, out of those released by the rebels, 32 were soldiers. This brought the overall number of prisoners released by the rebels to 3,215. Among those still held by the separatists, 74 were soldiers. The number of released prisoners was updated to 3,233 in early March 2019. At the end of December 2019, a new prisoner exchange took place, with Ukraine releasing 124 separatist fighters and their supporters, while 76 prisoners, including 12 soldiers, were returned to Ukraine by the rebels. Another five or six prisoners released by the separatists decided to stay in rebel-controlled territories. The last exchange took place on 16 April 2020, with the separatists releasing 20 people, including 17 civilians, in exchange for 14. while 214 remained in captivity.

=== Foreign fighters ===
Foreign volunteers have been involved in the conflict, fighting on both sides. The NGO Cargo 200 reported that they documented the deaths of 1,479 Russian citizens while fighting as part of the rebel forces. The United States Department of State estimated 400–500 of these were regular Russian soldiers. Five Abkhazians, two Kyrgyz, one Georgian and one South Ossetian have also been killed fighting on the separatist side. Additionally, at least 253 foreign-born Ukrainian citizens or foreigners died on the Ukrainian side. One of those killed was the former Chechen rebel commander Isa Munayev.

In late August 2015, according to a reported leak by a Russian news site, Business Life (Delovaya Zhizn), 2,000 Russian soldiers had been killed in Ukraine by 1 February 2015.

=== Foreign civilians and journalists ===
At least 306 foreign civilians were killed in the war in Donbas prior to the 2022 invasion:

- 298 passengers and crew of Malaysia Airlines Flight 17
- Italian journalist Andrea Rocchelli and his Russian fixer and interpreter, activist Andrei Mironov
- Four other civilian journalists and media workers from Russia: Igor Kornelyuk and Anton Voloshin, a correspondent and sound engineer respectively; Anatoly Klyan, a camera operator; and Andrey Stenin, a photojournalist
- One Russian civilian killed in the shelling of Donetsk, Russia
- One Lithuanian diplomat

=== Landmines and other explosive remnants ===
As a consequence of the conflict, large swaths of the Donbas region have become contaminated with landmines and other explosive remnants of war (ERW). According to the UN Humanitarian Coordinator in Ukraine, in 2020 Ukraine was one of the countries most affected by ERW in the world, and had had nearly 1,200 casualties caused by mines or ERW since the beginning of the conflict in 2014. A report by UNICEF released in December 2019 said that 172 children had been injured or killed due to landmines and other explosives.

== Russo-Ukrainian war (2022–present) ==
=== Total casualties ===
Ukrainian estimates of Russian military losses tended to be high, while Russian estimates of their own losses tended to be low. Combat deaths can be inferred from a variety of sources, including satellite imagery and video image of military actions. According to a researcher at the Department of Peace and Conflict Research at Uppsala University in Sweden, regarding Russian military losses, Ukraine engaged in a misinformation campaign to boost morale and Western media were generally happy to accept its claims, while Russia was "probably" downplaying its own casualties. Ukraine also tended to be quieter about its own military fatalities. According to BBC News, Ukrainian claims of Russian fatalities included the injured as well. Western countries emphasized the Russian military's toll, while Russian news outlets have largely stopped reporting on the Russian death toll. In early June 2022, the Svetlogorsk City Court in the Kaliningrad region ruled that a list of Russian soldiers killed in Ukraine, published by privately owned news websites, constituted "classified information" and its publication could be considered a criminal offence. Le Monde estimated 500,000 total deaths in the war by February 2026.

Information on military casualties is a state secret in both Russia and Ukraine, while the Ukrainian government has been especially secretive, restricting access to demographic data that could be used to estimate its losses. In addition, Western intelligence agencies have been reluctant to disclose their internal calculations of Ukrainian military casualties for fear of undermining an ally. American officials previously said that Ukraine withholds this information from even its closest allies.

The number of civilian and military deaths is impossible to determine with precision. The Office of the United Nations High Commissioner for Human Rights (OHCHR) considers the number of civilian casualties to be considerably higher than the one the United Nations are able to certify.

Breakdown	Casualties	Time period	Source
Civilians in Ukraine	17,257 killed, 53,693 wounded (Note: At least 181 foreign civilians from 25 countries are confirmed to have been killed within Ukraine. See table here for a detailed breakdown of deaths by nationalities. In addition, 12 Russian civilian journalists were killed within Ukraine while covering the conflict.) (confirmed minimum, thought higher)	24 Feb 2022 – 31 Aug 2026	United Nations
Ukrainian civilians	12,000+ killed (confirmed), (Note: See table at § Civilian casualties for a detailed breakdown of civilian deaths by oblast, according to Ukrainian authorities.); 16,000+ captive (Note: Some civilians have been reported to have died in captivity in Russia, like journalist Victoria Roshchyna.)	24 Feb 2022 – 17 Jun 2024; 24 Feb 2022 – 16 Dec 2024	Ukraine
Russian civilians	394 killed (in Western Russia)	24 Feb 2022 – 25 Dec 2024	7x7
Russian civilians	472 killed (in Western Russia)	1 Jan 2025 – 31 Jul 2026	Conflict Intelligence Team
Russian civilians	1,074 killed (including Crimea), 330 missing	24 Feb 2022 – 15 Jan 2026	Russia
Ukrainian forces	200,000 killed	24 Feb 2022 – 19 Feb 2026	BBC News estimate
Ukrainian forces	1,500,000 killed and wounded	24 Feb 2022 – 24 Feb 2026	Russian Ministry of Defense
Ukrainian forces	500,000 killed, wounded and missing	24 Feb 2022 – 21 Apr 2026	MIVD
Ukrainian forces	525,000–625,000 casualties (125,000–150,000 killed)	24 Feb 2022 – 1 Jul 2026	CSIS estimate
Ukrainian forces	106,285 killed (incl. non-combat), 105,786 missing, 12,824 captured (conf. by names)	24 Feb 2022 – 25 Oct 2026	UALosses project
Ukrainian forces (AFU)	55,000 killed, 380,000 wounded, 81,000 missing, 7,000 captured	24 Feb 2022 – 4 Feb 2026; 24 Feb 2022 – 27 Feb 2026; 24 Feb 2022 – 27 May 2026	Ukraine
Russian forces	1,300,000–1,450,000 casualties (500,000 killed)	24 February 2022 – 17 Jun 2026	NATO estimate
Russian forces	1,400,000 casualties (400,000–450,000 killed)	24 Feb 2022 – 1 Jul 2026	CSIS estimate
Russian forces	412,576 killed	24 Feb 2022 – 28 Aug 2026	Leaked Rosstat register
Russian forces	1,500,000 casualties, (500,000) killed	24 Feb 2022 – 11 Sep 2026	United Kingdom estimate
Russian forces	1,559,230 losses (Note: Including killed, captured, missing and wounded. Possibility of double-counting, as some soldiers could have been counted two or three times: as wounded, as captured, and then as killed.)	24 Feb 2022 – 15 Oct 2026	Armed Forces of Ukraine
Russian forces	544,329-663,124 killed	24 Feb 2022 – 13 Nov 2026	BBC News Russian estimate
Russian forces (DPR & LPR militia excluded)	352,000 killed (276,113 dead confirmed by name) (Note: For other Meduza estimations, see § Meduza analysis.)	24 Feb 2022 – 31 Dec 2025	Mediazona & Meduza estimate
Russian forces (DPR & LPR militia excluded)	523,329-639,624 killed (287,831 conf. by names)	24 Feb 2022 – 13 Nov 2026	BBC News Russian & Mediazona estimate
Russian forces (PMC Wagner)	22,000 killed, 40,000 wounded	24 Feb 2022 – 20 May 2023	PMC Wagner
Russian forces (PMC Wagner)	20,000 killed, 40,000 wounded	24 Feb 2022 – 30 Nov 2023	UK estimate
Russian forces (PMCs Wagner, Redut & others)	19,598–20,137 killed (conf. by names)	24 Feb 2022 – 3 Nov 2026	BBC News Russian & Mediazona
Russian forces (Donetsk & Luhansk PR)	21,000–23,500 killed	24 Feb – 31 Dec 2022	BBC News Russian estimate
DPRK forces	6,000+ killed and wounded	14 Dec 2024 – 15 Jun 2025	UK estimate
DPRK forces	6,000 killed and wounded, 2 captured	14 Dec 2024 – 12 Feb 2026	South Korean estimate
DPRK forces	2,304 killed	14 Dec 2024 – 31 Dec 2025	BBC News analysis of DPRK memorial

==== Russian losses ====
In September 2022, Russia's Ministry of Defence confirmed that 5,937 Russian soldiers had been killed in combat. In addition, the DPR confirmed that by 22 December 2022, 4,163 of their servicemen had been killed and 17,329 wounded. (Note: The DPR stated 4,176 of its servicemen had been killed and 17,379 wounded between 1 January and 22 December 2022, of which 13 died and 50 were wounded between 1 January and 25 February 2022, leaving a total of 4,163 killed and 17,329 wounded in the period of the Russian invasion.) Subsequently, leaked US intelligence documents cited the Russian FSB that Russian forces suffered 110,000 casualties by 28 February 2023. Wagner PMC chief Yevgeny Prigozhin confirmed that his organization had over 20,000 troops killed by 25 May 2023. He went on to claim that overall, the Russian military had lost 120,000 dead in Ukraine by late June 2023. He accused the Ministry of Defence of systematically downplaying Russian losses.

According to BBC News Russian and the Mediazona news website, out of 287,831 Russian soldiers and contractors whose deaths they had documented by 13 November 2026, 2.8 percent (7,983) were officers, while 18.3 percent (52,614) were Motorized Rifle Troops and 2.4 percent (6,832) were members of the Russian Airborne Forces (VDV). In addition, 7.3 percent (21,029) of Russian soldiers whose deaths had been confirmed were people who were mobilized, while 9.7 percent (27,947) were convicts. The BBC further stated that

The actual toll is likely much higher than can be determined through open sources. Military experts we interviewed suggest that our analysis of Russian cemeteries, war memorials, and obituaries may account for between 45% and 65% of the real death toll.

Thus, the BBC stated that the actual death toll of Russian forces, counting only Russian servicemen and contractors (i.e. excluding DPR/LPR militia), was 544,329 to 663,124 by 13 November 2026.

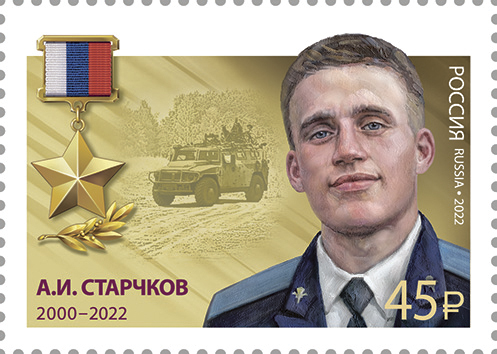
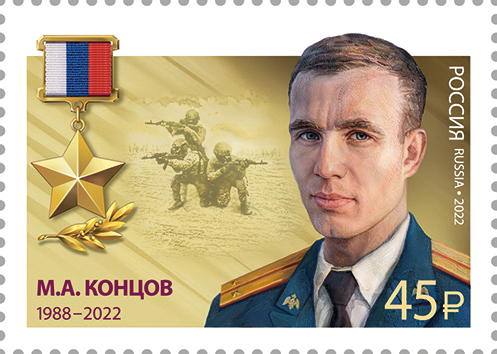
Postage stamps depicting a Russian private (on the left) and an officer (on the right) killed in the Russo-Ukrainian War in 2022

The Center for Strategic and International Studies (CSIS) found that 60,000 to 70,000 Russian soldiers died in the first year of the war in Ukraine, more than in all its other wars since World War II combined, including 13,000 to 25,000 in Chechnya over 15 years and 14,000 to 16,000 in Afghanistan. Thus, the first year of the Ukraine war was 25 times deadlier than Chechnya and 35 times more so than Afghanistan.

In February 2023, Meduza published an article about the portion of Russian military casualties classified as missing, describing systemic problems with Russia's military record-keeping making it difficult for families to obtain their bodies or file for compensation by the government. Sergey Krivenko, head of the human-rights advocacy organization "Citizen. Army. Law.", estimated the amount of missing Russian soldiers at this time to be around 24,000, adding that most of the missing are soldiers who have been killed but have not had their body recovered.

Meduza, analysing data on confirmed soldiers killed and data retrieved from the Russian probate registry, estimated 75,000 Russian soldiers were killed since the start of the invasion of Ukraine and by the end of 2023, a statistical estimate within a wide range of between 66,000 and 88,000 killed. Subsequently, several months later, Meduza gave a new estimate of 64,000 soldiers killed in 2022 and 2023, based on excess deaths reported by Rosstat, including those in Crimea, but not other Ukrainian regions seized by Russia. Using a similar analysis, but in addition using a statistical model of the ratio of total deaths to deaths confirmed by name, stratified by age group, and the Mediazona updated counts of named deaths, Meduza gave an updated estimate of total Russian deaths of 120,000 killed through to 30 June 2024. Several days later, The Economist made its own calculation using the severely-wounded-to-killed ratio from leaked documents by the United States Department of Defense, giving an estimate of between 462,000 and 728,000 Russian soldiers killed or wounded since the start of the conflict. According to their estimate, approximately 2% of all Russian men between the ages of 20 and 50 may have been killed or seriously wounded in Ukraine since February 2022. By the end of 2024, Meduza estimated that over 165,000 Russian soldiers had died during the war.

According to NATO and Western military officials, around 1,200 Russian soldiers were killed or wounded in Ukraine every day on average in May and June 2024. In July 2024, Chief of the General Staff of the British Army Sir Roland Walker said that with the current way of fighting, it would take Russia five years to control the four regions of Donetsk, Luhansk, Kherson and Zaporizhia that Russia claims as its own, and it would cost Russia from 1.5 to 1.8 million casualties. He said there are "no winners" in Russia's invasion of Ukraine, adding that "it is an utter devastation for both sides and lost generations". By August 2024, the daily average of Russian military casualties in the conflict was about 1,000 soldiers, according to a Western official.

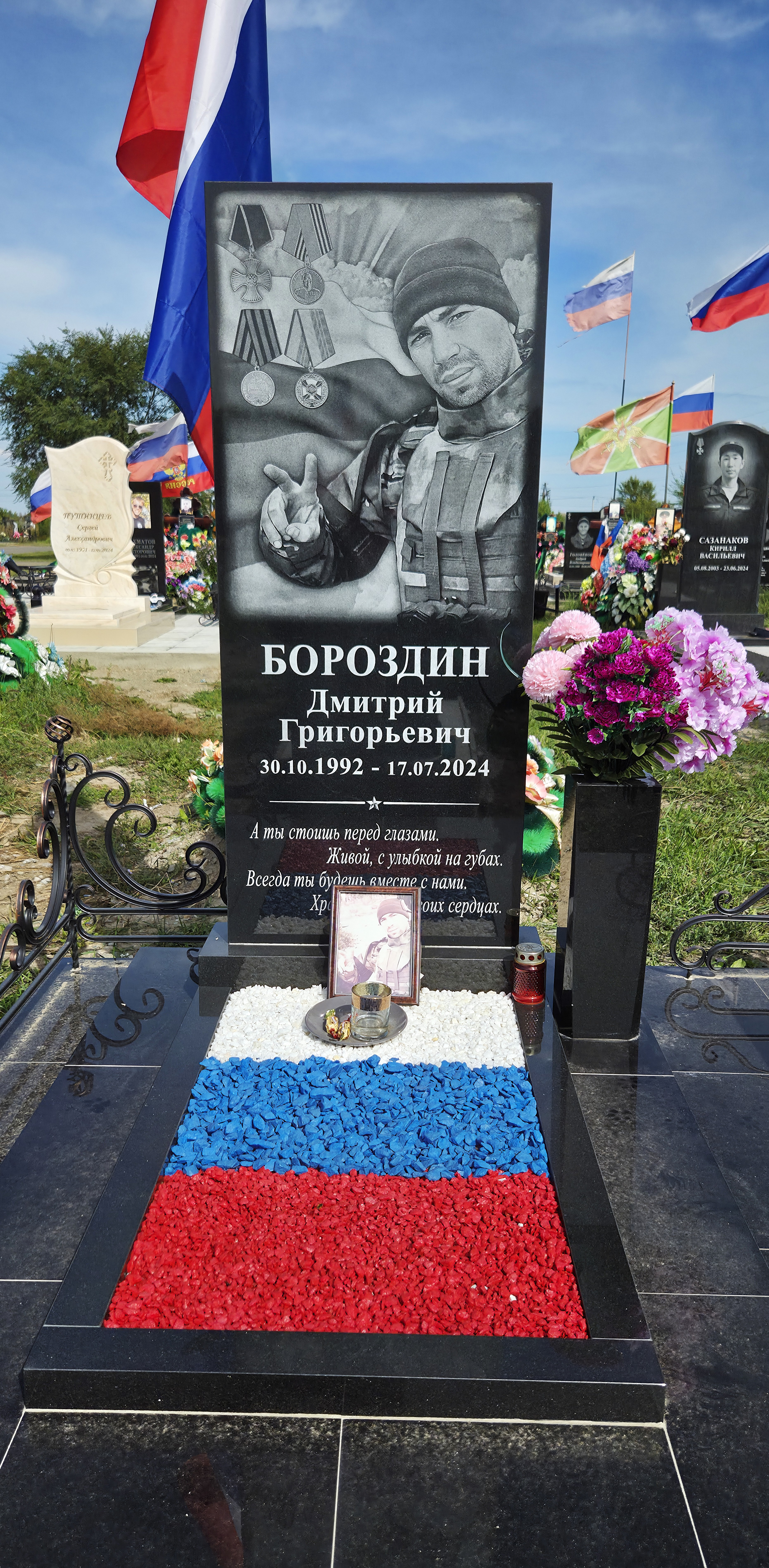
Military graves at Cemetery No. 7 in Abakan, Khakassia, Russia, August 2025

In late January 2025, The New York Times reported that analysts concluded that Russia's losses, including killed and severely injured, were slightly fewer than two soldiers for every Ukrainian soldier killed or severely wounded, after they combined multiple different estimates of Ukrainian losses.

In June 2025, Russia's ambassador to the UK Andrey Kelin denied that Russian casualties in the war in Ukraine had reached one million, but refused to give the actual number of casualties, telling CNN that there were about 600,000 Russian troops in Ukraine, down from 700,000 in June 2024, and that 50–60,000 new troops were being recruited and sent to Ukraine every month. Concurrently, a report by the US-based Centre for Strategic and International Studies (CSIS) put Russian military casualties at over 950,000, including up to 250,000 killed.

In October 2025, Institute for the Study of War (ISW) cited alleged leaked Russian data published by the I Want to Live hotline operated by the Main Directorate of Intelligence of Ukraine, according to which Russia suffered 281,550 total losses between January and August 2025, including: 86,744 killed, 33,996 missing and 158,529 wounded. The Mediazona's data department's analysis of the published list concluded that "significant anomalies" were revealed, stating the figures in the leak appeared "questionable", but also that it "appears plausible, to put it cautiously, albeit at the very highest end of the probable range" and questioned certain figures like losses reported for the Dnepr group or abnormally high killed-to-wounded ratio, though acknowledging that the "grey zone" between front lines means the wounded are often left with very little chance of survival. According to online intelligence group Frontelligence Insight the numbers appeared to be "fairly accurate", and some other groups agreed with this assessment.

According to a UK Defence Intelligence report on 14 October 2025, Russia suffered approximately 1.118 million total casualties since the beginning of the full-scale invasion, including 332,000 casualties since 1 January. According to the report, Russia's casualty rate reached its high in December 2024 with 1,570 losses per day on average. Afterwards it was gradually decreasing and dropped to 930 daily casualties in August. It has been steadily increasing again since then, surpassing 1,000 daily casualties between 5 and 12 October.

An analysis published by The Economist on 17 October 2025, based on data from satellites and "more than 200 credible estimates of casualties from Western governments and independent researchers", stated that Russia's total casualty toll had increased by 60% since the start of the year, with over 100,000 soldiers reportedly killed since the beginning of 2025. According to the report, even if the total number of Ukrainian soldiers killed since the start of 2025 was twice the tally reported by the UALosses project, it would still result in a ratio of "roughly five Russian soldiers killed for one Ukrainian". The report also stated that the number of Russian soldiers killed in the war amount to 0.5%–1.2% of the country's pre-war cohort of men under the age of 60.

In February 2026, The Telegraph reported that for the first time since the invasion, Russia was losing more soldiers than it was able to recruit, with Western officials saying that Russia was losing 40,000 per month since November while recruiting up to 35,000 as total casualties surpassed 1.25 million, more than the total number of American casualties sustained by the US in World War II.

In March 2026, Ukrainian defense minister Mykhailo Fedorov said that an increasing number of Russian soldiers were taking their own lives, adding that there is daily video confirmation from the front of this occurring. According to Fedorov, the increase is due to the Russian military leadership sending in untrained soldiers, denying evacuation and exposing them to ″constant drone attacks″.

According to Ukrainian commander-in-chief Oleksandr Syrskyi, Russian forces suffered over 141,500 total casualties between January and May 2026, including more than 83,000 killed. Ukrainian president Zelenskyy said that Russia had suffered its highest losses in a single month since the start of the invasion in March of that year, with over 35,000 killed or wounded Russian soldiers. Ukraine's general staff reported that Russia had suffered over 1,700 casualties on 17 March, with the Ukrainian unmanned systems force being responsible for 900 of them. On 10 March 2026, president Zelenskyy and the Ukrainian head of military intelligence Lieutenant General Oleh Ivashchenko said that according to Russian documents obtained by Ukrainian intelligence networks, some 1,315,000 Russian soldiers had been killed or wounded in action since the start of the full scale invasion of Ukraine. President Zelenskyy said that these figures were "understated".

On 27 May 2026, the BBC reported that, according to the British intelligence agency GCHQ, nearly 500,000 Russian soldiers had been killed in the war since 2022. The BBC itself was able to confirm the names of 223,539 Russian soldiers killed in Ukraine by that point. Analysis by the BBC and Mediazona estimated that 37% of fatalities were originally civilians who had volunteered after the war broke out, 20% were military contractors, 11% were conscripted prisoners and 9% had been mobilized. In June 2026, Novaya Gazeta reported on a Russian soldier born in 2008 who had been killed in the war, the 18-year old was identified by journalists from Mediazona and the BBC. According to Novaya Gazeta, at least 200 Russian 18-year olds have been killed on the front since the start of the 2022 full-scale invasion. In July 2026, Oxford historian Peter Frankopan cited an estimate by Russian military bloggers that Russian soldiers in some areas of the frontline have a life expectancy of 20–35 minutes amidst evolving Ukrainian drone capabilities.

In August 2026, the Poland-based outlet Vot Tak published an investigation in which it found that at least 50 Russian women have been killed while serving as military personnel in the war.

On 1 October 2026, the Ukrainian General Staff reported that Russian casualties for September 2026 were 46,230 personnel, a forty six percent increase on casualties from January 2026. A “senior NATO military official” told Bloomberg that Russia lost more than 50,000 personnel in September, some 28,000 killed. Ukraine lost some 5,000 casualties during September. On 1 November 2026, the Ukrainian General Staff claimed that Russia lost 54,400 personnel during October 2026, the worst losses in a single month since the beginning of the full-scale war. The losses surpassed previous monthly figures on 29 October, when the Ukrainian General Staff claimed that 49,040 Russian personnel were “lost” during the ongoing month. One week later, the Ukrainian General Staff stated that Russia lost “2,980 personnel killed or severely wounded” on 8 November 2026, the highest daily loss of Russian personnel since the start of the war.

The Financial Times estimated that by the end of 2026, the Russian military's death toll in the conflict would reach 650,000.

===== Compensation scams =====
When a Russian soldier is killed, their next of kin receives a compensation of 5 million rubles ($64,000). There have been several reports of Russian women duping men into marriage to claim this compensation for themselves, cutting out other relatives. Russian officials and state media have dubbed these women ″black widows″. In one widely reported 2025 ″black widow″ case, a nurse working at a military hospital was accused of marrying five soldiers in her care before they died of their injuries to claim their death benefits, which resulted in the nurse being fired.

==== Ukrainian losses ====
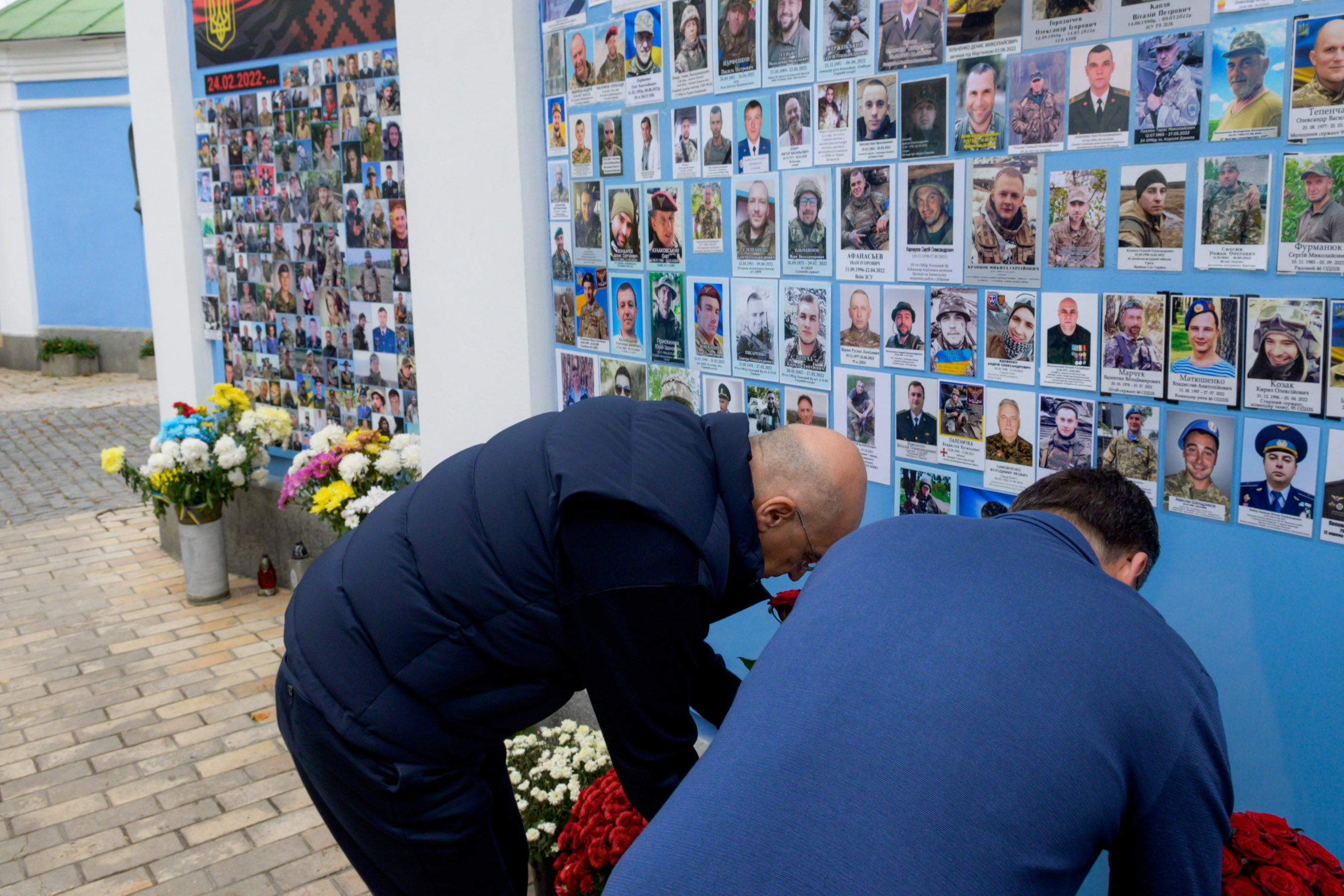
Monument to Ukrainian soldiers killed in the Russo-Ukrainian War in 2022

Ukraine confirmed it had 10,000 killed and 30,000 wounded by the start of June 2022, while 7,200 troops were missing, including 5,600 captured. At the height of the fighting in May and June 2022, according to Ukrainian president Zelenskyy and presidential advisor Mykhailo Podolyak, between 100 and 200 Ukrainian soldiers were being killed in combat daily, while presidential adviser Oleksiy Arestovych said 150 soldiers were being killed and 800 wounded daily. In mid-June, Davyd Arakhamia, Ukraine's chief negotiator with Russia, told Axios that between 200 and 500 Ukrainian soldiers were killed every day. By late July, Ukrainian daily losses fell to around 30 killed and about 250 wounded. In August 2023, The New York Times quoted unnamed U.S. officials as saying that up to 70,000 Ukrainian troops had been killed and 100,000 to 120,000 wounded. However, a new estimate by a U.S. official in October 2024, put the number of Ukrainian casualties at more than 57,500 killed and 250,000 wounded. As of 25 February 2024, Ukraine confirmed 31,000 of its soldiers had been killed in the conflict. In late November 2024, based on all previous estimates of Ukrainian military casualties, The Economist estimated Ukrainian losses at between 60,000 and 100,000 killed and 400,000 wounded. In early December 2024, Ukrainian journalist Yuriy Butusov, citing sources within the headquarters of the Ukrainian military, estimated 70,000 Ukrainian soldiers had been killed and 35,000 were missing. Soon after, on 8 December 2024, US president-elect Donald Trump claimed 400,000 Ukrainian soldiers had been killed and seriously wounded so far during the war. Subsequently, President Zelenskyy announced 43,000 Ukrainian soldiers were killed and 370,000 were wounded, but that "approximately 50%" of these soldiers recovered and had returned to active duty. He updated the Ukrainian military's casualty toll in mid-February 2025, to over 46,000 killed and 380,000 wounded.

Russia's Ministry of Defence claimed 61,207 Ukrainian soldiers had been killed and 49,368 wounded by September 2022, and in mid-December 2024, updated its claim of Ukrainian military casualties to almost 1,000,000 killed and wounded. A new update was given in late February 2026, putting Ukraine's overall military casualties at more than 1,500,000.

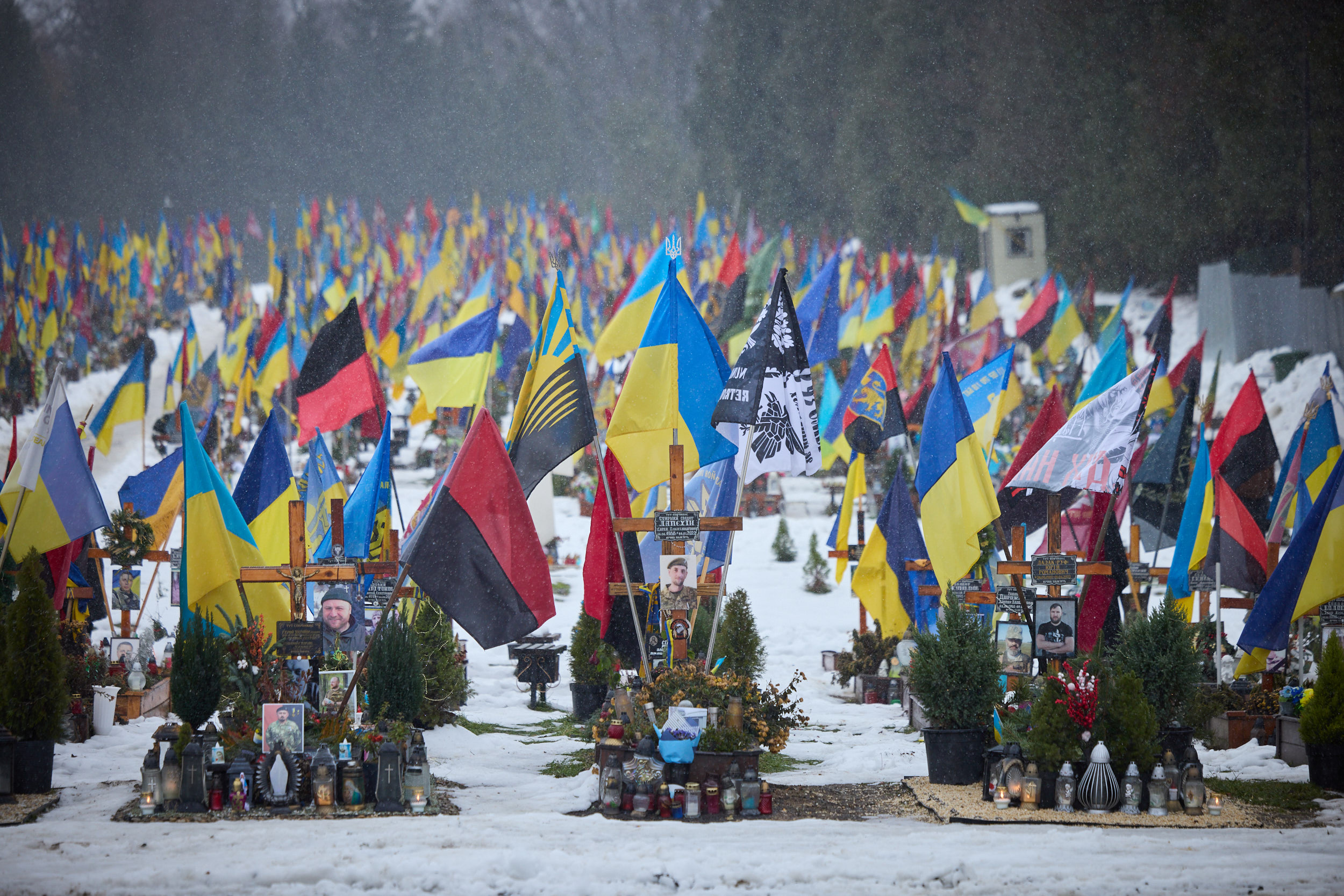
Military graves at the Lychakiv Cemetery in Lviv, Ukraine, December 2023

According to the UALosses project started at the end of 2023, found to be reliable by Mediazona, Meduza, the Book of Memory group, BBC News Russian and The Economist, themselves also running projects tracking military fatalities in the conflict, it had documented by name the deaths of 106,285 killed Ukrainian fighters as of 25 October 2026, as well as 105,786 missing in action, for a total of 212,071 dead or missing since the start of the invasion, including non-combat losses.

As of mid-April 2023, around 7,000 Ukrainian soldiers remained missing, of whom some 60–65 per cent were believed to be prisoners. The number of missing was updated to over 90,000 by the end of February 2026, 90 percent of which were thought to be soldiers.

Yuriy Lutsenko, the former Ukrainian Prosecutor General and member of the opposition party European Solidarity, said on Ukrainian television in January 2024 that around 500,000 Ukrainian soldiers had been killed or wounded, and that there were about 30,000 casualties every month.

==== Regions and officers ====
Men from the poverty-stricken regions of Russia's Far North, Far East and Siberia were overrepresented among Russian war casualties. Buryats, Kalmyks, Tuvans, Chukchi, and Nenets were reported as Russia's ethnic minority groups suffering disproportionately high casualty rates among Russian forces. On the Ukrainian side, per UALosses, as of 25 October 2026, the Dnipropetrovsk Oblast has the highest number of confirmed Ukrainian soldiers dead or missing at 22,066, while the Kirovohrad Oblast has the highest confirmed death and missing count per capita at 9.566 per 1,000.

In February 2024, it was reported that the ongoing war with Russia has led to the depopulation of several ethnic Hungarian villages in Ukraine. The main causes of the depopulation of the ethnic Hungarian villages was reported to be a combination of refugees fleeing to Hungary, Austria, and Germany, and the mobilization of village men.

In terms of confirmed deaths of officers of both belligerents, according to groups collecting that information, 7,983 Russian officers had been killed as of 3 November 2026, and 8,606 Ukrainian officers had been killed as of 25 October 2026.

==== Age ====
According to The Times, the average age of Russian soldiers who had been killed rose to 34 by mid-2024, up from an average age of 21 in 2022.

According to data from UALosses, as of 25 October 2026, the average age of Ukrainian soldiers who have been killed in action since the start of the 2022 Russian invasion is 39. UALosses also reported that the recent average age based on Ukrainian soldiers who had been killed, missing in action, or became prisoners of war is 56.

=== Civilian casualties ===
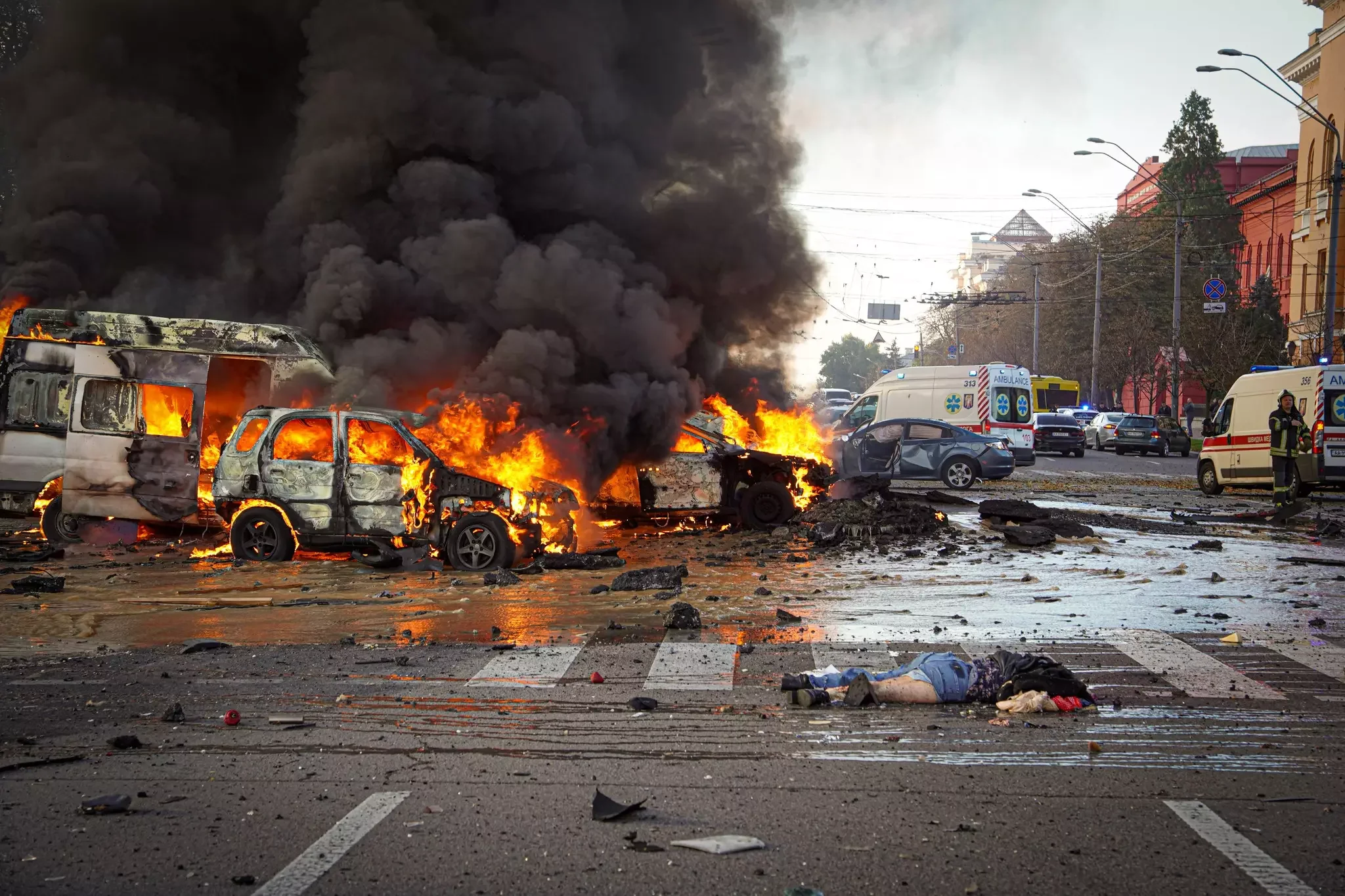
A civilian killed in Kyiv following Russian missile strikes on 10 October 2022

By 31 August 2026, OHCHR had recorded 70,950 civilian casualties in Ukraine since 24 February 2022: 17,257 killed and 53,693 injured, but said they believe the real number is higher. This included, as of 30 June 2026, 57,367 (13,542 killed and 43,825 injured) occurred on territory covered by the government of Ukraine and 7,677 (2,889 killed and 4,788 injured) on territory controlled by Russian armed forces or their affiliates. By 31 December 2025, 13,172 deaths were caused by explosive weapons "with wide area effects", 472 by mines and explosive remnants, 1,355 by small arms, including from crossfire, or road accidents involving military or civilian vehicles.

As of 30 June 2023, OHCHR said it had received information on 287 civilian casualties in Western Russia, with 58 killed and 229 injured, while six more were killed and 16 injured in the Republic of Crimea. Another two civilians were killed and one injured in a Ukrainian drone attack on the Crimean bridge on 17 July 2023, while five civilians were killed and 151 were injured by a Ukrainian missile attack in Sevastopol, in Crimea, on 23 June 2024. Sergey Aksyonov, the Russian-installed head of Crimea, also alleged that a Ukrainian attack on drilling platforms in the Black Sea near Crimea had left seven Chernomorneftegaz workers missing. The 7x7 Russian opposition media outlet confirmed the deaths of 394 civilians in Russia by 25 December 2024, not including those in Crimea, while the CIT Russian opposition NGO confirmed 472 civilian deaths in Russia in 2025 and the first seven months of 2026. In addition, missiles struck the Polish border village of Przewodów in Lublin Voivodeship on 15 November 2022, and killed two Polish civilians. Elsewhere, Azerbaijan Airlines Flight 8243 was mistakenly shot down and crashed at Aktau, Kazakhstan, on 25 December 2024, killing 38 people, including 25 Azerbaijanis, seven Russians and six Kazakhs.

In April 2022, the civilian death toll included more than 200 children. In March 2022, 55 of the war-related child deaths were from the Kyiv area and another 34 were from Kharkiv. On 17 February 2023, the Ukrainian prosecutor general announced that at least 461 children had been killed since the start of the invasion, with a further 923 wounded. Most of these child victims were from the Donetsk region.

By February 2023, Ukrainian chief prosecutor for war crimes Yuriy Belousov claimed that "there could be 100,000 civilians killed across Ukraine, whose bodies will have to be found and identified once occupied territory is liberated". A Project on Defense Alternatives study calculated a "modest" figure of 40,000 Ukrainian civilian dead by April 2023. In May 2023, US officials claimed Ukrainian civilian deaths were at 42,000, twice the then-estimated figure for Ukrainian military losses. According to the Kyiv Independent, Russia does not allow monitoring in territories it controls, where civilian deaths are thought to be highest.

Ukrainian humanitarian NGOs estimate that 7,000–30,000 Ukrainian civilians have been abducted by Russian forces from territories under their control. One group estimated 70,000 civilians were abducted. Many of them are reported to be held in Russian prisons and penal colonies, and some reportedly died (e.g. Victoria Roshchyna).

Civilian deaths by area (Ukrainian-controlled and formerly Ukrainian-controlled)
Area	Fatalities	Time period	Source	Ref.
Cherkasy Oblast	26	24 Feb 2022 – 31 Dec 2023	Ukrainian authorities	(Note: Total of 26 reported killed: 1 killed (24 February 2022); 1 killed (26 June 2022); 23 killed (28 April 2023); 1 killed (29 December 2023))
Chernihiv Oblast	725+	24 Feb 2022 – 19 Aug 2023	Ukrainian authorities	(Note: At least 725 reported killed: 700+ as of 23 April 2022; 7 killed (19 August 2023); 18 killed (17 April 2024))
Dnipropetrovsk Oblast	171	24 Apr 2022 – 15 May 2024	Ukrainian authorities	(Note: Total of 171 reported killed: 1 killed (24 April 2022); 10 killed (27 May 2022); 7 killed (28 June 2022); 4 killed (15 July 2022); 2 killed (16 July 2022); 2 killed (19 July 2022); 11 killed (10 August 2022); 25 killed (25 August 2022); 1 killed (28 August 2022); 4 killed (18–22 September 2022); 3 killed (29 September 2022); 4 killed (10 October 2022); 2 killed (25 October 2022); 4 killed (16 December 2022); 45 killed (14 January 2023); 2 killed (28 April 2023); 4 killed (26 May 2023); 1 killed (4 June 2023); 11 killed (13 June 2023); 1 killed (25 June 2023); 1 killed (9 August 2023); 1 killed (17 August 2023); 1 killed (25 August 2023); 7 killed (29 December 2023); 2 killed (23 February 2024); 3 killed (12 March 2024); 8 killed (19 April 2024); 2 killed (15 May 2024))
Donetsk Oblast	28,673+	24 Feb 2022 – 12 Feb 2025	Ukrainian authorities	(Note: 28,673+ killed: 3,673 killed, excluding Mariupol and Volnovakha; 25,000+ killed in Mariupol)
Kharkiv Oblast	1,699	24 Feb – 31 Dec 2022	Ukrainian authorities	
Kherson Oblast	566	24 Feb 2022 – 30 May 2024	Ukrainian authorities	(Note: Total of 566 reported killed: 439 killed in formerly Russian-controlled areas; 1 killed (1 December 2022); 2 killed (12 December 2022); 3 killed (14 December 2022); 1 killed (21 December 2022); 13 killed (24 December 2022); 2 killed (4 January 2023); 4 killed (5 January 2023); 3 killed (15 January 2023); 3 killed (11 March 2023); 1 killed (27 April 2023); 31 killed by Russia's destruction of the Kakhovka Dam; 1 killed (13 July 2023); 4 killed (31 July 2023); 1 killed (7 August 2023); 7 killed (13 August 2023); 2 killed (20 August 2023); 3 killed (29 August 2023); 1 killed (2 September 2023); 2 killed (30 October 2023); 1 killed (1 November 2023); 2 killed (2 November 2023); 1 killed (9 November 2023); 3 killed (13 November 2023); 9 killed (16-17 November 2023); 4 killed (23 November 2023); 1 killed (9 December 2023); 4 killed (24 December 2023); 3 killed (26 December 2023); 4 killed (5 February 2024); 1 killed (6 February 2024); 1 killed (9 March 2024); 1 killed (30 March 2024); 1 killed (19 April 2024); 1 killed (23 April 2024); 1 killed (29 April 2024); 2 killed (18 May 2024); 1 killed (20 May 2024); 1 killed (30 May 2024))
Khmelnytskyi Oblast	4	24 Feb 2022 – 27 Feb 2023	Ukrainian authorities	(Note: Total of 4 reported killed: 1 killed (31 December 2022); 1 killed (23 February 2023); 2 killed (27 February 2023))
Kirovohrad Oblast	9	24 Feb 2022 – 4 Jan 2024	Ukrainian authorities	(Note: Total of 9 reported killed: 3 killed (23 July 2022); 5 killed (28 July 2022); 1 killed (4 January 2024))
Kyiv	200	24 Feb 2022 – 24 Feb 2024	Ukrainian authorities	
Kyiv Oblast	1,569	24 Feb – 2 Apr 2022	Ukrainian authorities	
Luhansk Oblast	815	24 Feb – 31 Dec 2022	Ukrainian authorities	
Lviv Oblast	22	18 Apr 2022 – 6 Jul 2023	Ukrainian authorities	(Note: Total of 22 reported killed: 7 killed (18 April 2022); 5 killed (9 March 2023); 10 killed (6 July 2023))
Mykolaiv Oblast	413	24 Feb 2022 – 17 Jan 2023	Ukrainian authorities	(Note: Total of 413 reported killed: 403 killed as of 2 August 2022; 9 killed (11 November 2022); 1 killed (17 January 2023))
Odesa Oblast	51	24 Feb 2022 – 2 Mar 2024	Ukrainian authorities	(Note: Total of 51 reported killed: 1 killed (3 March 2022); 8 killed (24 April 2022); 1 killed (11 May 2022); 22 killed (1 July 2022); 1 killed (23 September 2022); 1 killed (18 May 2023); 1 killed (23 July 2023); 4 killed (29 December 2023); 12 killed (2 March 2024))
Poltava Oblast	22	27 Jun 2022	Ukrainian authorities	
Rivne Oblast	25	24 Feb – 23 Jun 2022	Ukrainian authorities	(Note: Total of 25 reported killed: 21 killed (15 March 2022); 4 killed (23 June 2022))
Sumy Oblast	341	24 Feb – 31 Dec 2022	Ukrainian authorities	
Vinnytsia Oblast	30	24 Feb 2022 – 14 Mar 2024	Ukrainian authorities	(Note: Total of 30 reported killed: 6 killed (6 March 2022); 23 killed (14 July 2022); 1 killed (14 March 2024))
Volyn Oblast	8	24 Feb 2022 – 15 Aug 2023	Ukrainian authorities	(Note: Total of 8 reported killed: 4 killed (11 March 2022); 1 killed (25 July 2022); 3 killed (15 August 2023))
Zaporizhzhia Oblast	88	24 Feb 2022 – 18 Oct 2023	Ukrainian authorities	(Note: Total of 88 reported killed: 66 killed in 2022; 4 killed (1–9 January 2023); 13 killed (2 March 2023); 5 killed (18 October 2023))
Zhytomyr Oblast	283	24 Feb – 31 Dec 2022	Ukrainian authorities	

Civilian deaths by area (Russian-controlled areas and Russia)
Area	Fatalities	Time period	Source	Ref.
Donetsk People's Republic	1,791–5,090	26 February 2022 – 22 December 2024	Donetsk PR	(Note: The DPR stated 1,799 of its civilians were killed in its territories between 1 January 2022 and 22 December 2024, of which 8 died between 1 January and 25 February 2022, leaving a total of 1,791 killed in the period of the Russian invasion.) (Note: The JCCC stated that 5,090 civilians had been killed since the start of the invasion by 7 October 2024: 831 within the original borders of the DPR, and 3,831 killed in the areas since occupied by the DPR as of 29 August 2023.)
Luhansk People's Republic	972+	17 February 2022 – 28 December 2023	Luhansk PR	(Note: The LPR stated that more than 900 civilians had been killed since the start of the invasion by 31 December 2022, both in the original borders of the LPR, and the areas since occupied by the LPR, and including 169 deaths in Ukrainian artillery strikes on LPR territory. In addition, according to the LPR, 72 more civilians were killed in artillery strikes in 2023, leaving a total of more than 972 civilians deaths in LPR-controlled territories since the start of the invasion.)
Russian-annexed Kherson Oblast	68	6 June 2023, 1 January 2026	Russia	
Republic of Crimea	8	24 Feb 2022 – 17 Jul 2023	Russia	
Sevastopol	5	23 June 2024	Russia	
Western Russia	866	24 Feb 2022 – 31 Jul 2026	7x7 & CIT	

Civilian deaths by area (outside of Russia and Ukraine)
Area	Fatalities	Time period	Source	Ref.
Lublin Voivodeship, Poland	2	15 November 2022	Polish government	
Aktau, Kazakhstan	38	25 December 2024	Kazakhstan government	(Note: The 38 people killed included: 25 Azerbaijanis, seven Russians and six Kazakhs.)

=== Foreign civilians ===
At least 216 foreign civilians from 26 countries have been confirmed to have been killed during the war, most within Ukraine. Over 70 missing civilians from Azerbaijan have also been reported.

Country	Deaths and missing	Ref.
Azerbaijan	127 killed, 70 missing	
Armenia	18	
Greece	12	
France	6	
Kazakhstan	6	
United States	6	
Poland	5	
United Kingdom	5 (Note: Aid worker Paul Urey was captured by Russian forces on 29 April 2022 and died in detention on 15 July 2022. Aid workers Chris Parry and Andrew Bagshaw were killed in Bakhmut, the latter held dual UK and New Zealand citizenship.)	
Syria	4	
Turkey	4	
Belarus	3	
India	3 (Note: One was killed by drone strike in Russia's Moscow Oblast)	
Israel	2	
Moldova	2 (Note: Killed by a quadcopter that dropped an explosive device on a vehicle at the Troebortnoye border checkpoint, in Russia's Bryansk Oblast)	
Canada	2	
Afghanistan	1	
Algeria	1	
Bangladesh	1	
Croatia	1	
Czech Republic	1	
Egypt	1	
Iraq	1	
Ireland	1	
Lithuania	1	
Spain	1	
Uganda	1	

Paul Urey and Dylan Healy, two British aid workers, were captured by Russian forces. Healy was charged with 'forcible seizure of power' and undergoing 'terrorist' training, but later released on 21 September 2022, while Urey died in captivity. An American citizen was also detained by pro-Russian separatists forces and accused of 'participation in pro-Ukrainian protests'. He was released on 28 October 2022, and reached Ukrainian-controlled territory by 14 December.

=== Foreign fighters ===
Excluding the Russian, North Korean, and Ukrainian military casualties, at least 4,120–5,530 combatants, foreign citizens or foreign-born, were killed during the war. By January 2023, another 1,000 had been wounded while fighting on the Ukrainian side. Below is a list of the nationalities of foreign combatant casualties.

Dead foreign fighters of the Russian invasion of Ukraine
Country	Deaths	Allegiance	Ref.
Ukrainian Armed Forces (1,630–1,860)
Afghanistan	1	Ukrainian Foreign Legion	
Albania	2	Ukrainian Armed Forces	
Argentina	6	Ukrainian Armed Forces	
Armenia	2	Ukrainian Foreign Legion	
Australia	15	Ukrainian Foreign Legion	
Austria	2	Ukrainian Armed Forces	
Azerbaijan	26	Ukrainian Armed Forces; Georgian Legion	
Belarus	90–100	Ukrainian Armed Forces; Kastuś Kalinoŭski Battalion; Pahonia Regiment	
Belgium	1	Ukrainian Foreign Legion	
Brazil	38–136	Ukrainian Foreign Legion	
Bulgaria	4	Ukrainian Foreign Legion	
Canada	27	Ukrainian Armed Forces; Ukrainian Foreign Legion	
Chile	4	Ukrainian Armed Forces	
China	4	Ukrainian Foreign Legion	
Colombia	800	Ukrainian Foreign Legion; Sich Battalion	
Costa Rica	1	Ukrainian Armed Forces	
Croatia	2	Ukrainian Armed Forces	
Czech Republic	10	Ukrainian Foreign Legion	
Denmark	4–6	Ukrainian Foreign Legion	
Estonia	6	Ukrainian Foreign Legion	
Finland	10–13	Ukrainian Foreign Legion	
France	16 (Note: One was of Bosnian Croat origin, while another was of Russian origin.)	Ukrainian Foreign Legion; Sich Battalion	
Georgia	109	Ukrainian Armed Forces; Georgian Legion; Sich Battalion	
Germany	9	Ukrainian Foreign Legion; 49th Infantry Battalion	
Greece	2	Ukrainian Armed Forces	
Hungary	1	Ukrainian Armed Forces	
Iceland	1	Ukrainian Foreign Legion	
Ireland	6 (Note: One was a dual Irish-American citizen and is also possibly included in the death toll of American volunteers.)	Ukrainian Foreign Legion	
Israel	3 (Note: Includes confirmed by Israel.)	Ukrainian Armed Forces	
Italy	12 (Note: A killed Italian citizen was initially reported as Dutch because he had lived for several years in the Netherlands.)	Ukrainian Foreign Legion	
Japan	1	Ukrainian Armed Forces	
Kazakhstan	3	Ukrainian Armed Forces; Ukrainian Foreign Legion	
Latvia	5	Ukrainian Foreign Legion	
Lebanon	2	Ukrainian Armed Forces	
Lithuania	5	Ukrainian Armed Forces	
Mexico	7	Ukrainian Foreign Legion	
Moldova	3	Ukrainian Armed Forces	
Netherlands	4	Ukrainian Foreign Legion	
New Zealand	7	Ukrainian Foreign Legion	
Norway	1	Ukrainian Foreign Legion	
Panama	1	Ukrainian Armed Forces	
Paraguay	4	Ukrainian Armed Forces	
Peru	6	Ukrainian Armed Forces	
Poland	17	Ukrainian Foreign Legion	
Portugal	4	Ukrainian Foreign Legion	
Romania	6	Ukrainian Foreign Legion	
Russia	56	Ukrainian Armed Forces; Ukrainian Foreign Legion; Freedom of Russia Legion; Sheikh Mansur Battalion	
Serbia	1	Ukrainian Foreign Legion	
Slovakia	2	Ukrainian Foreign Legion	
South Korea	7	Ukrainian Foreign Legion	
Spain	20	Ukrainian Foreign Legion	
Sri Lanka	4	Ukrainian Armed Forces	
Sweden	9	Ukrainian Foreign Legion	
Switzerland	1	Ukrainian Armed Forces	
Taiwan	2	Ukrainian Armed Forces; Sich Battalion	
Tajikistan	1	Ukrainian Armed Forces	
Turkey	3	Ukrainian Armed Forces	
United Kingdom	47 (Note: One was a dual Portuguese-British national, while another was a dual South African-British national.)	Ukrainian Foreign Legion	
United States	118	Ukrainian Foreign Legion	
Uruguay	1	Ukrainian Armed Forces	
Uzbekistan	1	Ukrainian Armed Forces	
Venezuela	1	Ukrainian Armed Forces	

Dead foreign fighters of the Russian invasion of Ukraine
Country	Deaths	Allegiance	Ref.
Russian Armed Forces (2,469–3,649)
Afghanistan	2	Russian Army	
Africa	2 (Note: Two fighters of African origin have been reported killed. One of them has been variously reported to be from Ethiopia, Gabon or Guinea.)	Russian Army	
Algeria	11	Russian Army	
Argentina	1	Russian Army	
Armenia	43	Russian Army; Private military company	
Azerbaijan	108	Russian Army; Private military company	
Bangladesh	54	Russian Army	
Belarus	99	Russian Army; Private military company; Pyatnashka Brigade	
Benin	3	Russian Army	
Botswana	1	Russian Army	
Bosnia	2	Russian Army	
Brazil	2–12	Russian Army	
Bulgaria	1	Russian Army; DPR volunteer	
Burkina Faso	50	Russian Army	
Burundi	6	Russian Army	
Cameroon	104–150	Russian Army	
(Central African Republic) CAR	3	Private military company; Russian Army	
China	5	Russian Army	
Congo	3	Russian Army	
Colombia	19	Russian Army	
Cuba	20–93	Russian Army	
Ecuador	1	Russian Army	
Egypt	81	Russian Army	
Estonia	2	Russian Army	
Ethiopia	3	Russian Army	
Gabon	1	Russian Army	
Gambia	23	Russian Army	
Georgia	189 (Note: Including at least 56 from Abkhazia and at least 99 from South Ossetia, both generally recognised as part of the sovereign territory of Georgia.)	Russian Army; Private military company	
Ghana	85	Russian Army	
Guinea	3	Russian Army	
Hungary	1	Russian Army	
India	51	Russian Army	
Indonesia	1	Russian Army	
Iran	1	Russian Army	
Iraq	2–32	Russian Army Private military company	
Italy	2	Russian Army	
Ivory Coast	4	Russian Army; Private military company	
Japan	1	Russian Army	
Jordan	2	Russian Army	
Kazakhstan	67–270	Russian Army; Private military company	
Kenya	37–59	Russian Army	(Note: According to the Kenyan government, 69 Kenyans have been killed or were missing in the conflict, 32 of which were previously confirmed to be missing, leaving at least 37 confirmed killed.)
Kyrgyzstan	89–143	Russian Army; Private military company	
Latvia	1	Russian Army	
Libya	1	Russian Army	
Lithuania	1	Russian Army	
Mali	15	Russian Army	
Mauritius	1	Russian Army	
Moldova	70	Russian Army; Private military company	
Morocco	2	Russian Army	
Nepal	118	Russian Army	
Niger	1	Russian Army	
Nigeria	11	Russian Army	
Palestine	1	Russian Army	
Panama	1	Russian Army	
Paraguay	1	Russian Army	
Peru	20	Russian Army	
Philippines	2	Russian Army	
Poland	1	Russian Army	
Serbia	15	Russian Army; Private military company	
Senegal	6	Russian Army	
Sierra Leone	3	Russian Army	
South Africa	2	Russian Army	
Sri Lanka	59–275	Russian Army	
Sudan	5	Russian Army	
Syria	11	Russian Army; Private military company	
Tajikistan	199–444	Russian Army; Private military company	
Tanzania	3	Private military company	
Togo	3	Russian Army	
Tunisia	1	Russian Army	
Turkmenistan	26–61	Russian Army	
Uganda	11	Russian Army	
Ukraine	398	Russian Army; Private military company	
United Kingdom	1	Russian Army	
United States	3	Russian Army; Vostok Battalion	
Uzbekistan	229–481	Russian Army; Private military company	
Vietnam	1	Russian Army	
Yemen	19–35	Russian Army	
Zambia	2	Private military company; Russian Army	
Zimbabwe	18	Russian Army	
Donetsk PR forces (17)
Abkhazia (Note: Both Abkhazia and South Ossetia are generally recognised as part of the sovereign territory of Georgia.)	14	Pyatnashka Brigade	
Colombia	1	Pyatnashka Brigade	
Italy	1	Pyatnashka Brigade	
South Ossetia	1	Pyatnashka Brigade	
Luhansk PR forces (4)
Italy	1	Prizrak Brigade	
Finland	1	Prizrak Brigade	
Serbia	1	Prizrak Brigade	
Slovakia	1	Prizrak Brigade	

Captured foreign fighters of the Russian invasion of Ukraine
Country	Captured	Allegiance	Status	Ref.
Ukrainian Armed forces (35)
Australia	1	Ukrainian Armed Forces	Prisoner	
Azerbaijan	1	Ukrainian Armed Forces	Released	
Belarus	2	Kastuś Kalinoŭski Battalion	Prisoners	
Brazil	1	Ukrainian Armed Forces	Prisoner	
Colombia	12	Ukrainian Armed Forces	Prisoners	
Croatia	1	Ukrainian Foreign Legion	Released	
Czech Republic	1 (Note: Reported as a dual Czech-Vietnamese national.)	Ukrainian Armed Forces	Prisoner	
Georgia	3	Ukrainian Foreign Legion	Prisoners	
Israel	1	Ukrainian Foreign Legion	Released	
Ivory Coast	1	Ukrainian Armed Forces	Prisoner	
Morocco	1	Ukrainian Foreign Legion	Released	
Serbia	1	Azov Battalion	Prisoner	
Sweden	1	Ukrainian Foreign Legion	Released	
United Kingdom	6	Armed Forces of Ukraine; Ukrainian Foreign Legion	4 released; 2 prisoners	
United States	2	Ukrainian Foreign Legion	Released	

Captured foreign fighters of the Russian invasion of Ukraine
Country	Captured	Allegiance	Status	Ref.
Russian Armed forces (106)
Abkhazia	1	Russian Army	Prisoner	
Argentina	1	Russian Army	Prisoner	
Azerbaijan	2	Russian Army	Prisoners	
Bangladesh	1	Russian Army	Prisoner	
Belarus	8	Russian Army; Private military company	Prisoners	
Bosnia	1	Russian Army	Prisoner	
Brazil	1	Russian Army	Prisoner	
Burundi	2	Russian Army	Prisoners	
Cameroon	2	Russian Army	Prisoners	
China	3	Russian Army	Prisoners	
Colombia	9	Russian Army	Prisoners	
Congo Republic	1	Russian Army	Prisoner	
Cuba	4	Russian Army	Prisoners	
Egypt	1	Russian Army	Prisoner	
Ghana	2	Russian Army; Private military company	Prisoner	
Greece	1	Russian Army	Prisoner	
Honduras	1	Russian Army	Prisoner	
India	1	Russian Army	Prisoner	
Indonesia	1	Russian Army	Prisoner	
Iran	1	Russian Army	Prisoner	
Iraq	2	Russian Army	Prisoners	
Italy	1	Russian Army	Prisoner	
Kazakhstan	6	Russian Army; Private military company	Prisoners	
Kenya	2	Russian Army	Prisoners	
Kyrgyzstan	2	Russian Army	Released	
Mali	1	Russian Army	Prisoner	
Nepal	11	Russian Army	Prisoners	
Nigeria	3	Russian Army	Prisoners	
Panama	1	Russian Army	Prisoner	
Paraguay	1	Russian Army	Prisoner	
Peru	4	Russian Army	Prisoners	
Philippines	1	Russian Army	Prisoner	
Senegal	1	Russian Army	Prisoner	
Sierra Leone	1	Russian Army	Prisoner	
Slovakia	1	Russian Army	Prisoner	
Somalia	1	Russian Army	Prisoner	
Sri Lanka	6	Russian Army	Prisoners	
Syria	1	Russian Army	Prisoner	
Tajikistan	1	Russian Army	Prisoner	
Togo	2	Russian Army	Prisoners	
Turkey	1	Russian Army	Prisoner	
Uganda	1	Russian Army	Prisoner	
Uzbekistan	4	Russian Army; Private military company	1 released; 3 prisoners	
Vietnam	1	Russian Army	Prisoner	
Yemen	3	Russian Army	Prisoners	

Two Peruvians, an Azerbaijani, a Colombian, a Czech, an Estonian, a French and a Paraguayan foreign fighter were also reported missing while fighting alongside the Ukrainian military, and 132 Nepalese, 32 Kenyans, 16 Ugandans, five Indians, three Argentinians, three Belarusians, one Australian and one Briton went missing while fighting for Russia.

Two British Army servicemen officially deployed in Ukraine died in non-combat incidents as of September 2026. On 10 December 2025, the Ministry of Defence of the United Kingdom (MoD) announced that a member of the Parachute Regiment, Lance Corporal George Hooley, was killed in a "tragic accident" while observing Ukrainian forces testing a "new defensive capability" away from the combat zone. On 12 September, the MoD announced the death of a second British soldier, this time in a road traffic incident behind the frontlines. The soldier was identified as Major Paul Wilks, a member of the Intelligence Corps.

=== Identification, repatriation and exchanges ===
Sergiy Kyslytsya, the Ukrainian Ambassador to the United Nations, announced on 27 February 2022, that the country had reached out to the International Committee of the Red Cross for help in the repatriation effort of the bodies of killed Russian soldiers. Due to concerns that Russia was not reporting the number or any casualties of soldiers in Ukraine, the Ukrainian Interior Ministry began issuing appeals that same day for relatives of Russian soldiers to help identify wounded, captured, or killed soldiers. The initiative, called Ishchi Svoikh (Russian: Ищи Своих, lit. 'Look for Your Own'), appeared aimed in part at undermining morale and support for the war in Russia and was quickly blocked by the Russian government's media regulator the day the initiative began at the request of Russia's Prosecutor-General's Office.

Ukrainian authorities began using facial recognition technology supplied to them by Clearview AI on 12 March 2022, to help identify the deceased, along with potentially using it to uncover Russian spies, vet people at checkpoints and potentially combat misinformation. The Chief Executive of Clearview claimed that the technology could be more effective than matching fingerprints or other identifiable aspects of the individual, although a study by US Department of Energy raised concerns about decomposition reducing its effectiveness. Kyiv authorities have also reached out to the International Commission on Missing Persons, which was formed to help after the 1990s Balkan conflicts and the 1995 Srebrenica massacre, and identifies individuals by collecting DNA samples from the deceased and families to cross match. The organization will also document the location of the body and how the individual died.

As Russian soldiers began to retreat the identification of the dead civilians who had been unreported due to communication issues and constant fighting began to be reported. Documentation and identification of the bodies began with many hastily dug graves and rubble being cleared away to photograph and identify the bodies as well as count the number involved. Handwritten tags and passports have been attached to the bodies after identification before they are taken by coroners and officials. In some locations villagers kept track of the deceased, such as in Yahidne, a village north of Kyiv, where they used a school basement wall to write the names of the deceased while under Russian control.

As of late May 2022, Ukrainian authorities had stored at least 137 bodies of Russian soldiers that were collected near Kyiv, as well as 62 in the Kharkiv region. In December 2024, Russia's Deputy Minister of Defence Anna Tsivilyova mentioned 48,000 soldiers missing in action for whom relatives have contributed DNA samples as part of search applications.

In March 2026, TVP World reported on intercepted Russian messages which according to the HUR depicted a repeated practice in some Russian units where Russian soldiers are instructed by officers to behead killed Russian soldiers and bring the head along with documents for identification. According to the HUR, this is done so that the heads can be used to identify the bodies without the need to evacuate corpses out of combat zones.

Remains of soldiers
Dates of remains exchanges	Russian	Ukrainian	Ref.
June 2022	374	365	
29 March 2024	29	121	
12 April 2024	23	99	
2 August 2024	38	250	
18 October 2024	89	501	
8 November 2024	37	563	
20 December 2024	42	503	
24 January 2025	49	757	
14 February 2025	45	757	
28 March 2025	43	909	
18 April 2025	41	909	
16 May 2025	34	909	
10-16 June 2025	78	6,060 (Note: Ukraine claimed 20 of the bodies it received belonged to Russian soldiers.)	
16 July 2025	19	1,000	
19 August 2025	19	1,000	
19 September 2025	24	1,000	
20 November 2025	30	1,000	
26 February 2026	35	1,000	

=== Amputations ===
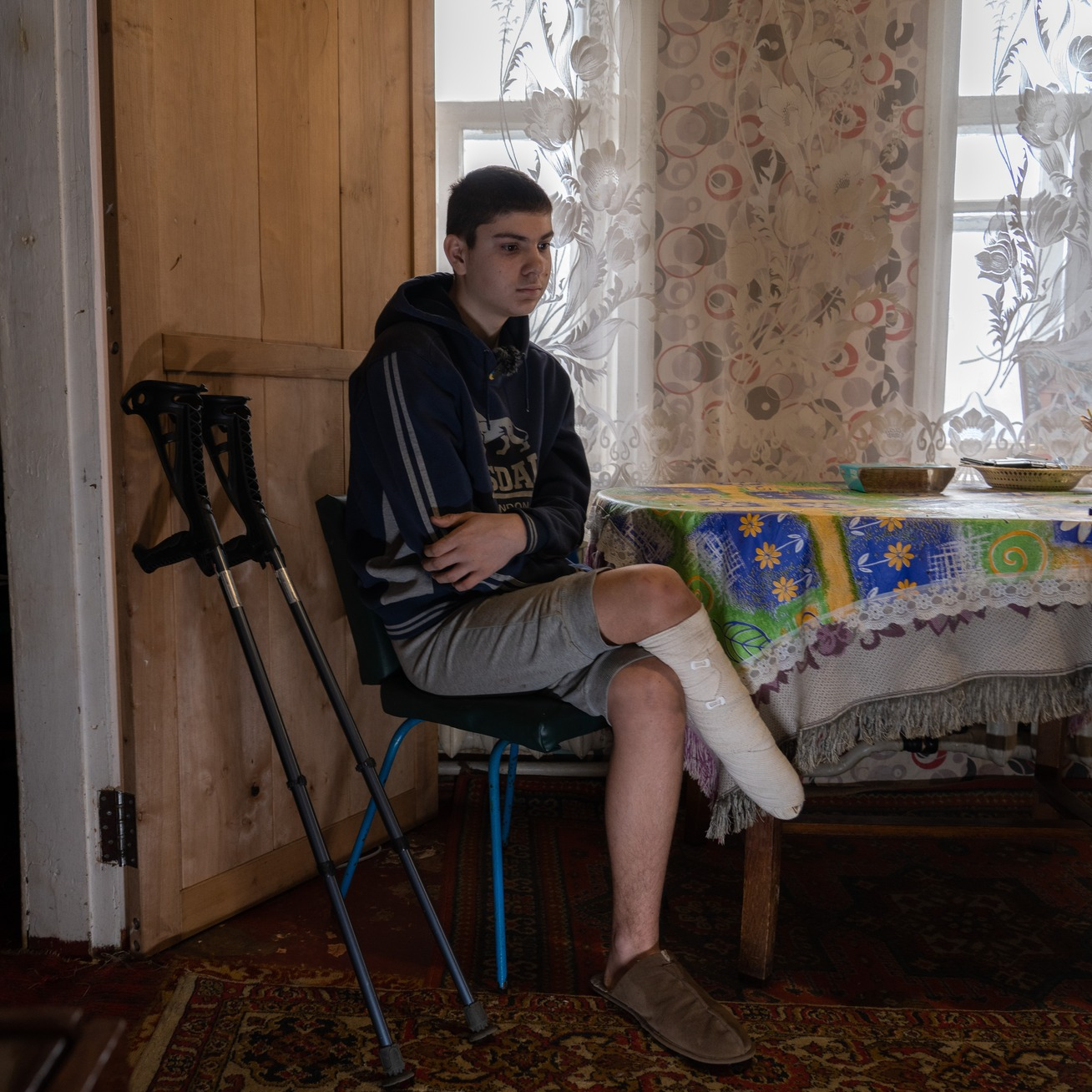
16-year-old victim of a land mine in Kharkiv region

On 2 August 2023, an investigation by The Wall Street Journal found that Ukrainian medical amputations in the war came to between 20,000 and 50,000 including both military and civilians. In August 2025, the National Institute of Strategic Studies reported that officially, the National Health Service of Ukraine recorded 95,000 amputations carried out in Ukraine on military personnel and civilians. Including amputations carried outside Ukraine the number was as high as 120,000. In comparison, during World War I, 41,000 British and 67,000 Germans needed amputations.

=== Prisoners of war ===
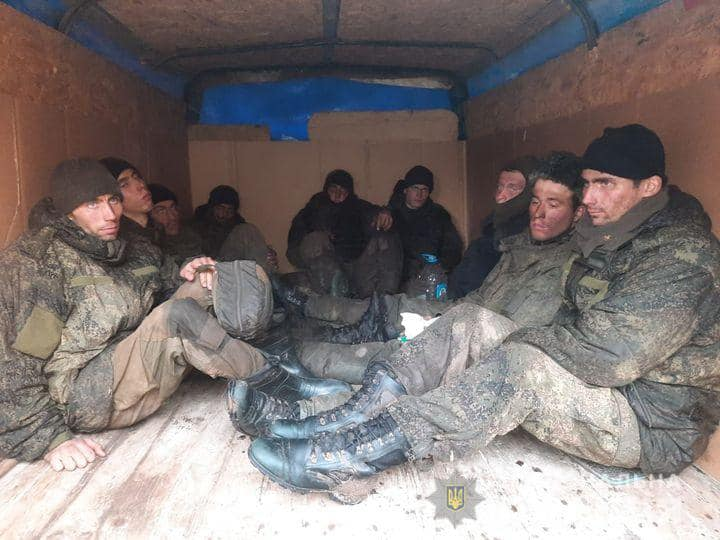
Captured Russian soldiers during the battle of Sumy

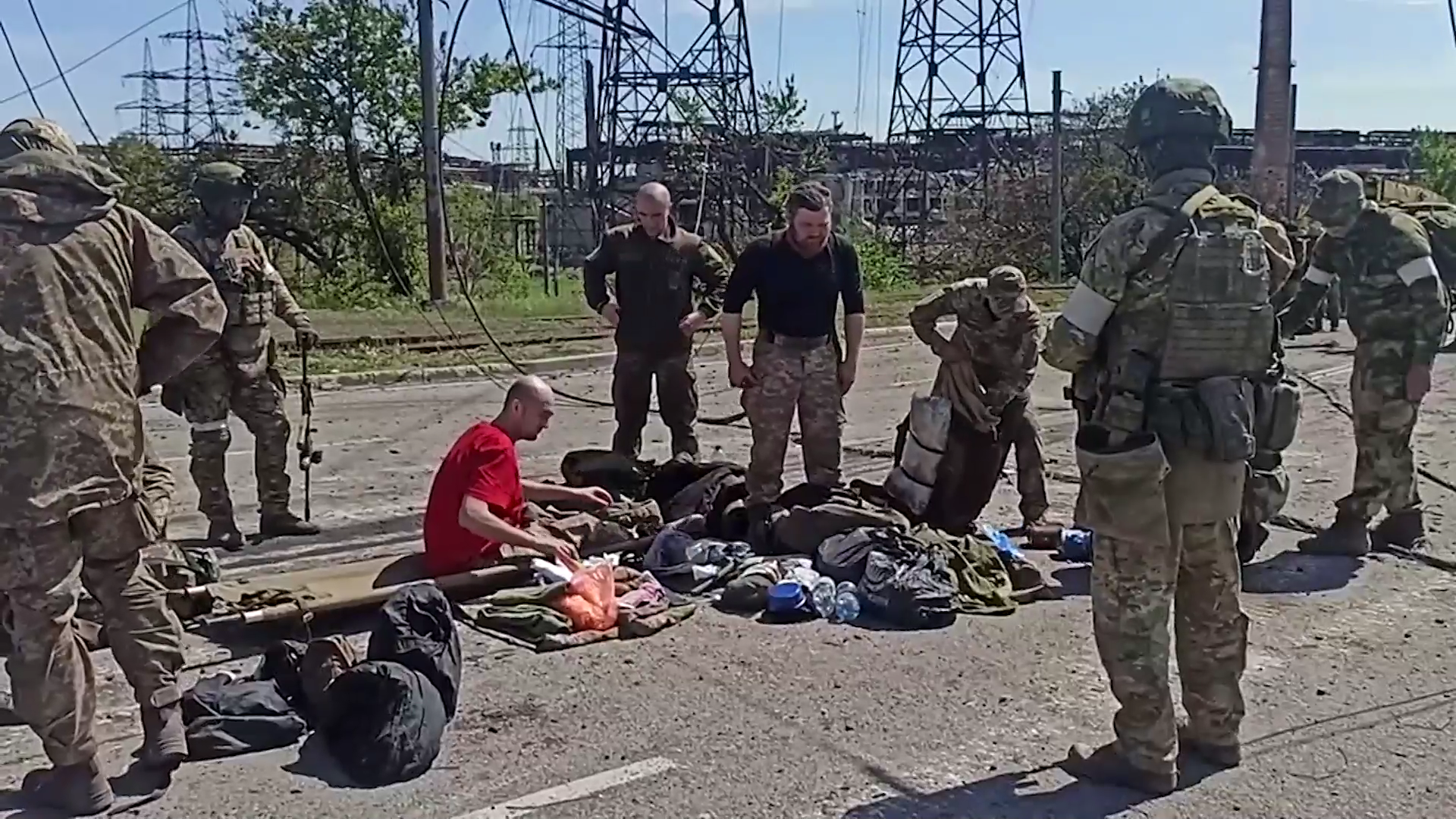
Ukrainian soldiers surrender at the end of the siege of Mariupol

Russia reported it had captured 572 Ukrainian soldiers by 2 March 2022, while Ukraine stated 562 Russian soldiers were being held as prisoners as of 19 March, with 10 previously reported released in prisoner exchanges for five Ukrainian soldiers and the mayor of Melitopol, Ivan Fedorov. Subsequently, the first large prisoner exchange took place on 24 March, when 10 Russian and 10 Ukrainian soldiers, as well as 11 Russian and 19 Ukrainian civilian sailors, were exchanged. Among the released Ukrainian soldiers was one of 13 Ukrainian border-guard members captured during the Russian attack on Snake Island. Later, on 1 April 86 Ukrainian servicemen were exchanged for an unknown number of Russian troops.

Ukraine's ambassador to the U.S., Oksana Markarova, reported that a platoon of the 74th Guards Motor Rifle Brigade from Kemerovo Oblast surrendered to Ukraine, saying they "didn't know that they were brought to Ukraine to kill Ukrainians". Ukraine held a series of press conferences with about a dozen POWs, where the POWs made comments against the invasion, how they had been manipulated and for the conflict to end. According to The Guardian, while it was likely that Ukraine was using the discomfort of captured soldiers for propaganda purposes, the videos ultimately succeeded in showing the Russian servicemen's "authentic sense" of regret for having come to Ukraine. Amnesty International said that Article 13 of the Third Geneva Convention prohibits videos of captured soldiers. Captured Ukrainian soldiers with British citizenship were recorded calling for Boris Johnson to arrange for them to be freed in exchange for pro-Kremlin Ukrainian politician Viktor Medvedchuk. MP Robert Jenrick called the videos, broadcast separately on Russia-24, a "flagrant breach" of the Geneva Convention. A Russian spokeswoman claimed that she told Johnson in a phone call about the men's treatment that the UK should "show mercy" to Ukrainian citizens by stopping military aid to the Ukrainian government when asked to show the men mercy.

The head of the Ukrainian Coordination Headquarters for POW Treatment, Iryna Vereshchuk, raised concerns that Russia had not released information to Ukrainian authorities on the location of any Ukrainian POWs and the International Red Cross had not been allowed to see them, as of 16 March.

By 21 April, Russia claimed that 1,478 Ukrainian troops had been captured during the course of the siege of Mariupol. On 22 April, Yuri Sirovatko, Minister of Justice of the Donetsk People's Republic, claimed that some 3,000 Ukrainian prisoners of war were held in the territory of the DPR. On 20 May, the Russian Ministry of Defense claimed that 2,439 Ukrainian soldiers had been taken prisoner over the previous five days as a result of the surrender of the last defenders of Mariupol, entrenched inside the Azovstal Iron and Steel Works. On 26 May, Rodion Miroshnik, ambassador of the Luhansk People's Republic to Russia, claimed that around 8,000 Ukrainian POWs were held within the territory of the DPR and LPR. According to a statement by Sergei Shoigu, Russia's Minister of Defence, in early June 2022, 6,489 Ukrainian soldiers had surrendered since the start of the Russian invasion of Ukraine.

In a report by The Independent on 9 June, it cited an intelligence report that more than 5,600 Ukrainian soldiers had been captured, while the number of Russian servicemen being held as prisoners had fallen to 550, from 900 in April, following several prisoner exchanges. In contrast, the Ukrainska Pravda newspaper claimed 1,000 Russian soldiers were being held as prisoners as of 20 June.

According to Ukraine, as of mid-November 2023, 4,337 Ukrainians were being held by Russia as prisoners of war, including 3,574 soldiers and 763 civilians, while by this point 2,598 Ukrainians had been released, including 133 civilians. As of early June 2024, according to Russia, 6,465 Ukrainian soldiers were still being held prisoner in Russia and 1,348 Russian soldiers were prisoners in Ukraine, while by this point 3,210 Ukrainians had been confirmed released, including 143 civilians. By 6 June 2026, the number of prisoners released by Russia rose to between 8,669 and 9,441, including 457 civilians. Thousands were released during prisoner exchanges and hundreds were released by Russia outside of the exchanges. At least 800 Russian soldiers had also been confirmed to have been released by late February 2023. Between August 2024 and March 2025, 971 Russian soldiers had been captured during fighting in Kursk Oblast, according to Ukraine. As of the beginning of February 2025, 1,382 Russian servicemen that were previously thought missing were confirmed to be in Ukrainian captivity, while the overall number of Russian prisoners of war was thought to be much higher.

According to the UALosses project, as of 25 October 2026, 12,833 Ukrainian soldiers were documented to have been taken prisoners during the war, of which 7,205 had been released.

A study of Russian prisoners of war captured by Ukraine found that 55% of the soldiers had been motivated to fight to "improve their livelihoods", while 36% were ideologically motivated.

Official prisoner exchanges (per Russia and Ukraine)
Number of exchange	Date	Russian POWs	Ukrainian POWs	Ref.
1.	24 March 2022	10 soldiers, 11 civilians	10 soldiers, 19 civilians	
2.	1 April 2022	Unknown	86 soldiers	
3.	9 April 2022	Unk. soldiers, 18 civilians	12 soldiers, 14 civilians	
4.	14 April 2022	Unknown	22 soldiers, 8 civilians	
5.	19 April 2022	Unknown	60 soldiers, 16 civilians	
6.	21 April 2022	Unknown	10 soldiers, 9 civilians	
7.	28 April 2022	Unknown	33 soldiers, 12 civilians	
8.	30 April 2022	Unknown	7 soldiers, 7 civilians	
9.	6 May 2022	Unk. soldiers, 11 civilians	28 soldiers, 13 civilians	
11.	10 June 2022	4 soldiers	4 soldiers, 1 civilian	
N/A	17 June 2022	Unknown	Unknown (at least 1 civ.)	
N/A	18 June 2022	5 N/A	5 civilians	
N/A	28 June 2022	15 N/A	16 soldiers, 1 civilian	
N/A	29 June 2022	144 soldiers	144 soldiers	
N/A	2 September 2022	Unknown	14 soldiers	
23.	21 September 2022	55 soldiers, 1 civilian (Note: Pro-Russian politician Viktor Medvedchuk)	213 soldiers, (Note: Includes soldiers, border guards, police officers and 9 foreign fighters from the International Legion of Territorial Defense of Ukraine) 2 civilians (Note: Includes a British aid worker.)	
24.	30 September 2022	Unknown	4 soldiers, 2 civilians	
25.	11 October 2022	Unknown	32 soldiers	
26.	13 October 2022	20 soldiers	20 soldiers	
27.	17 October 2022	30 soldiers, 80 civilians	96 soldiers, 12 civilians	
28.	26 October 2022	Unknown	10 soldiers	
29.	29 October 2022	50 soldiers	50 soldiers, 2 civilians	
N/A	3 November 2022	107 soldiers	107 soldiers	
N/A	11 November 2022	45 soldiers	45 soldiers	
N/A	23-24 November 2022	85 soldiers	85 soldiers, 1 civilian	
N/A	26 November 2022	9 soldiers	9 soldiers, 3 civilians	
N/A	1 December 2022	50 soldiers	50 soldiers	
N/A	6 December 2022	60 soldiers	60 soldiers	
N/A	14 December 2022	Unknown	64 soldiers, 1 civilian	
35.	31 December 2022	82 soldiers	140 soldiers	
36.-48.	2023	592+ soldiers	995 soldiers, 7 civilians	(Note: More than 592 Russian prisoners were confirmed exchanged in 2023. The number of released prisoners in four exchanges was not made known.) (Note: A total of 1,002 Ukrainian prisoners were exchanged in 2023, including seven civilians.)
49.-59.	2024	1,310 soldiers	1,329 soldiers, 29 civilians	(Note: A total of 1,310 Russian prisoners were exchanged in 2024.) (Note: A total of 1,358 Ukrainian prisoners were exchanged in 2024, including 29 civilians.)
60.	15 January 2025	25 soldiers	24 soldiers, 1 civilian	
61.	5 February 2025	150 soldiers	150 soldiers	
62.	19 March 2025	175 soldiers	197 soldiers	
63.	19 April 2025	261 soldiers	277 soldiers	
64.	6 May 2025	205 soldiers	205 soldiers	
65.	23-25 May 2025	880 soldiers, 120 civilians	880 soldiers, 120 civilians	
66.	9 June – 23 July 2025	1,200 soldiers, 2 civilians	1,100 soldiers and civilians	
67.	14 August 2025	84 soldiers	33 soldiers, 51 civilians	
68.	24 August 2025	146 soldiers, 8 civilians	146 soldiers, 8 civilians	
69.	2 October 2025	185 soldiers, 20 civilians	185 soldiers, 20 civilians	
70.	5 February 2026	157 soldiers, 3 civilians	150 soldiers, 7 civilians	
71.	5-6 March 2026	500 soldiers	500 soldiers, 2 civilians	
72.	11 April 2026	175 soldiers, 7 civilians	175 soldiers, 7 civilians	
73.	24 April 2026	193 soldiers	193 soldiers	
74.	15 May 2026	205 soldiers	205 soldiers	
75.	5 June 2026	185 soldiers	185 soldiers, 1 civilian	
76.	26 June 2026	160 soldiers	160 soldiers	
77.	19 August 2026	103 soldiers	103 soldiers	
78.	24 August 2026	10 soldiers	10 soldiers	
79.	23 October 2026	270 soldiers	261 soldiers, 9 civilians	

Unofficial prisoner releases
Date	Russian POWs	Ukrainian POWs	Ref.
1 March 2022	1 soldier	5 soldiers	
16 March 2022	9 soldiers	1 civilian	
15 April 2022	4 soldiers	5 soldiers	
12 July 2022	None	2 soldiers, 3 civilians	
24 March 2023	5 soldiers	None	
8 June 2023	None	11 soldiers	
4 March 2026	None	2 soldiers	

== See also ==
- Outline of the Russo-Ukrainian War
- The Wall of Remembrance of the Fallen for Ukraine
- Casualties during the 2013–2014 Ukraine crisis
- Military history of the Russian Federation
- Russian military recruitment crisis
- Ukrainian conscription crisis
