= Casualties during the 2013–2014 Ukraine crisis =

2013–2014 deaths from street unrest

The number of deaths during the 2013–2014 Ukraine crisis climbed to just over 200 during the Euromaidan protests and the ensuing pro-Russian unrest.

== Euromaidan ==
During the events of the Euromaidan protests in Kyiv from 21 November 2013 through 23 February 2014, a total of 110–123 protesters and 18 police officers were killed in street clashes in the Ukrainian capital.

== Russian annexation of Crimea ==
During the Russian annexation of Crimea from 23 February through 19 March 2014, six people were killed. The dead included: three protesters (two pro-Russian and one pro-Ukrainian), two soldiers and one Crimean SDF trooper. The two Ukrainian soldiers who were killed are regularly included in the military death toll from the war in Donbass. On 10 August 2016, Russia accused the Special Forces of Ukraine of conducting a raid near the Crimean town of Armyansk which killed two Russian servicemen. The government of Ukraine dismissed the report as a provocation.

== Odesa clashes and Kharkiv bombing ==
Between 26 January and 27 December 2014, sporadic clashes occurred in the city of Odesa. The deadliest of these were the 2 May 2014 Odesa clashes when 48 protesters were killed (46 pro-Russian and 2 pro-Ukrainian). In addition, one person was killed in a bomb explosion in Odesa on 27 December 2014. The same day, another man was killed in a bombing in the city of Kherson. Both men were identified as the bombers in both explosions. Later, in 2015, on 22 February, a bomb exploded during a rally in Kharkiv leaving four people dead, including a policeman.

== See also ==
- Casualties of the Russo-Ukrainian War
