= List of Russians killed fighting for the Ukrainian side during the Russian invasion of Ukraine =

At least 56 Russian citizens have been confirmed to have been killed during the Russo-Ukrainian war while fighting for the Ukrainian side. Many have had their names and ages undisclosed for safety reasons for the deceased's family.

On 19 March 2024, Russian President Vladimir Putin ordered the FSB to hunt down and “punish” Russians serving in the Ukrainian military and compared them to the Russian Liberation Army which had collaborated with Nazi Germany during World War II. Putin also ordered that Russians killed serving in the Ukrainian military be identified by name stating: "When I spoke about these traitors, I ask, since this has always been in our history, not to forget who they are, to identify them by name. We will punish them without a statute of limitations, wherever they are."

== List of fatalities ==
The following list contains 56 servicemen listed as killed among the Armed Forces of Ukraine, and Russian separatist formations embedded with Ukraine:

Date of death or announcement	Name	Group	Age	Location of death
March 9, 2022	Leonid Butusin	Ukrainian Armed Forces	20	Chernihiv region
March 9, 2022	Roman Butusin	Ukrainian Armed Forces	24	Chernihiv region
September 6, 2022	Sergei Petrovichev	Ukrainian Armed Forces	35	Izium, Kharkiv Oblast
September 14, 2022	Olga Simonova	Ukrainian Armed Forces	34	Kherson Oblast
December 30, 2022	Mykhailo "Altai"	Russian Volunteer Corps	N/A	Undisclosed
January 9, 2023	Ivan Dansky	Ukrainian Armed Forces	N/A	Donetsk Oblast
January 21, 2023	Serhii Gerasimyuk	Ukrainian Armed Forces	N/A	Undisclosed
April 27, 2023	Dmitry Petrov	Armed Forces of Ukraine	33	Bakhmut, Donetsk Oblast
April 27, 2023	Dmitry "Strem"	Russian Volunteer Corps	N/A	Undisclosed
May 24, 2023	Name undisclosed	Freedom of Russia Legion	N/A	Belgorod Oblast
May 24, 2023	Name undisclosed	Freedom of Russia Legion	N/A	Belgorod Oblast
June 3, 2023	Daniil Maznik	Russian Volunteer Corps	29	Novaya Tavolzhanka, Belgorod Oblast
July 7, 2023	“Baltika”	Russian Volunteer Corps	N/A	Zaporizhzhia Oblast
September 22, 2023	"Ayyub"	Dzhokhar Dudayev Battalion	N/A	Undisclosed
September 22, 2023	"Salman"	Dzhokhar Dudayev Battalion	N/A	Undisclosed
September 28, 2023	Magomed Bey Ganiev	Sheikh Mansur Battalion	N/A	near Zaporizhzhia, Zaporizhzhia Oblast
October 21, 2023	"Ansar"	Sheikh Mansur Battalion	N/A	Bakhmut
October 21, 2023	"Makhno"	Sheikh Mansur Battalion	N/A	Undisclosed
October 31, 2023	"Razor"	Russian Volunteer Corps	N/A	Avdiivka, Donetsk Oblast
November 21, 2023	Dmytro Hrytsenenko	Ukrainian Armed Forces	N/A	Undisclosed
December 29, 2023	"Skif"	Freedom of Russia Legion	N/A	Bakhmut
January 4, 2024	"Dad"	Freedom of Russia Legion	N/A	N/A
January 20, 2024	"Sotnik"	Freedom of Russia Legion	N/A	Kharkiv
February 15, 2024	"Hans"	Russian Volunteer Corps	N/A	Avdiivka direction
March 27, 2024	Dani Tammam Akel	Freedom of Russia Legion	25	Belgorod Oblast
April 5, 2024	Chich	Freedom of Russia Legion	N/A	Ukraine
April 7, 2024	Sergeiy Popov	Russian Volunteer Corps	N/A	Avdiivka direction
April 7, 2024	"Wolf"	Russian Volunteer Corps	N/A	Avdiivka direction
April 7, 2024	"Bashmak"	Russian Volunteer Corps	N/A	Avdiivka direction
April 7, 2024	"Tolyan"	Russian Volunteer Corps	N/A	Avdiivka direction
May 29, 2024	"Evzh"	Russian Volunteer Corps	N/A	Volchansk
August 9, 2024	Vladislav Yurchenko	Ukrainian Armed Forces	22	Kiburn Spit
September 19, 2024	Andrei Sergeevich Tarasov	Russian Volunteer Corps	N/A	Volchansk, Kharkiv Oblast
October 5, 2024	Ildar Dadin	Freedom of Russia Legion	42	Kharkiv Oblast
October 25, 2024	"Fartovy"	Freedom of Russia Legion	N/A	Kharkiv
October 26, 2024	"Leshy"	Freedom of Russia Legion	N/A	Kharkiv
November 6, 2024	Daniil Kruger Devyatkin	Russian Volunteer Corps	N/A	Volchansk, Kharkiv Oblast
November 6, 2024	Andrei Kos	Russian Volunteer Corps	N/A	Volchansk, Kharkiv Oblast
November 6, 2024	Andrei Crest	Russian Volunteer Corps	21	Volchansk, Kharkiv Oblast
December 18, 2024	"Sandro"	Freedom of Russia Legion	N/A	Ukraine
February 28, 2025	Anton Zyryanov Tourist	Russian Volunteer Corps	NA	NA
March 23, 2025	"Tritsak"	Russian Volunteer Corps	NA	NA
May 9, 2025	Alexander Sergeevich Kudashev Shadow	Russian Volunteer Corps	NA	NA
June 5, 2025	"Khabara"	Russian Volunteer Corps	NA	NA
June 5, 2025	"Persian"	Russian Volunteer Corps	NA	NA
June 5, 2025	"Yamal"	Russian Volunteer Corps	NA	NA
June 5, 2025	"Gosling"	Russian Volunteer Corps	NA	NA
June 5, 2025	"Milosh"	Russian Volunteer Corps	NA	NA
June 5, 2025	"Shov"	Russian Volunteer Corps	NA	NA
June 30, 2025	"Nafta"	Freedom of Russia Legion	NA	Zaporithzya
July 14, 2025	Pavlov Mikhail Viktorovich Pers	Russian Volunteer Corps	NA	Kupyansk
September 13, 2025	Andrey Kirillovich Murashkin	Russian Volunteer Corps	NA	Kupyansk
January 31, 2026	Alexander Alekseyevich Agafonov	Russian Volunteer Corps	NA	N/A
January 31, 2026	Sergey Alexandrovich Klimenko	Russian Volunteer Corps	NA	N/A
January 31, 2026	Timofei Sergeevich Anufriev	Russian Volunteer Corps	NA	N/A
April 14, 2026	Musa Khautiev	Ukrainian Armed Forces	NA	N/A

== See also ==
- Casualties of the Russo-Ukrainian War
- International Legion (Ukraine)
