= Russian military recruitment crisis =

Russo-Ukrainian war manpower struggle

Russia has faced increasing challenges in recruiting personnel for its military to replace combat losses in the Russo-Ukrainian war it started in 2022. The Institute for the Study of War reported that casualties began surpassing the number of personnel Russia was managing to recruit in January 2026.

To continue replenishing its ranks, Russia declared a "partial mobilization" in 2022, has recruited foreign nationals into its military, including by coercion, increased the recruitment of women, and pressured conscripts and civilians into signing military contracts.

== Background and measures ==
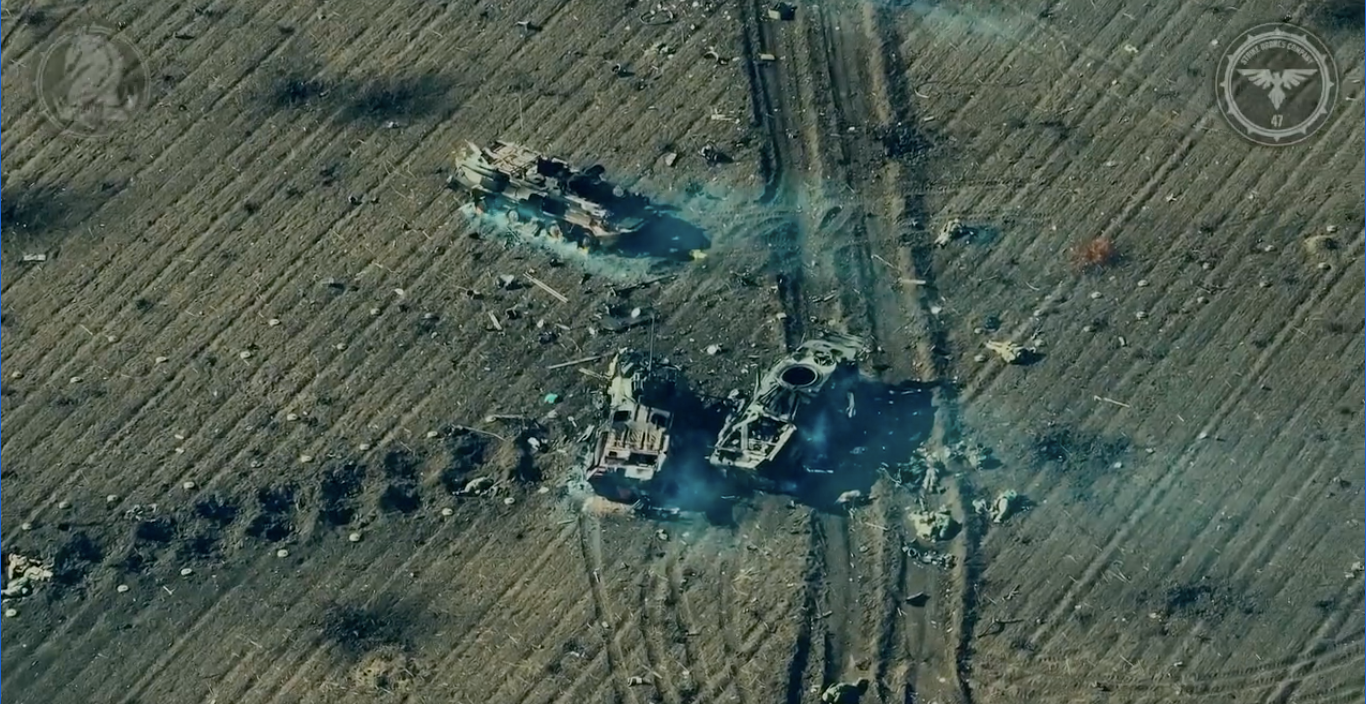
Russian casualties killed during the battle of Avdiivka (2023–2024)

On 21 September 2022, Russia declared that it was initiating a "partial mobilization" of military reservists to bolster the country's war effort against Ukraine. The mobilization is widely believed to have been introduced to address the Russian military's heavy casualties and lack of manpower, particularly in the face of major Ukrainian counter-offensives in Kherson and Kharkiv. According to Putin, about 300,000 Russians were mobilized.

Russia started recruting foreigners as early as 2022, with the Syrian Observatory for Human Rights reporting in January 2023 that just under 2,000 soldiers of the Syrian Arab Army, specifically the 25th Special Mission Forces Division, had been deployed to fight on behalf of Russia in Ukraine. The SOHR had obtained a document allegedly from the Syrian Government, explaining the Syrian Army's budget and salaries affecting Syrian soldiers in Ukraine.

In November 2024, Novaya Gazeta said that a number of Russian conscripts had been pressured to sign military contracts. After the beginning of the Kursk campaign, relatives of Russian conscripts said they were forced to sign contracts under threat of being sent to the Kursk region.

In January 2025, the Center for European Policy Analysis said that Russian losses had reached 700,000 killed, wounded, or missing by October 2024, with military recruitment barely covering these losses. To make up for the losses, Russia have used draftees, increased salaries and signing bonuses to new contract soldiers, imported troops from North Korea, extended its use of convicts and people under criminal investigation, and recruited foreign nationals. After consistently meeting its replacement rate targets for years, the Institute for the Study of War said that Russia's losses surpassed its recruitment rate in January 2026.

In July 2025, a report from El Pais estimated that as many as 20,000 Cubans had been recruited into the Russian Army since 2022, with some saying they had been told they were being hired for construction work, with around 200–300 killed. According to Verkhovna Rada member Maryan Zablotskyy, up to 40% of volunteers were part of the Cuban Armed Forces.

In April 2026, Russian human right groups said there was an increase in reports of intoxicated men being allegedly tricked or pressurized into signing contracts with the military, as using monetary tools for recruitment was becoming more difficult, causing recruiters to struggle with meeting quotas.

In May 2026, the Africa Center for Strategic Studies reported that Russia had developed a recruiting network targeting Africans, promising opportunities like jobs or training only to press the arrivals into military service and force them to the front or drone factories with dangerous conditions.

In July 2026, The Moscow Times said that according to independent media reports and analysts, Russia is finding it increasingly difficult to recruit new soldiers, as fewer men are willing to risk being sent to and potentially killed on the front, with further discouragement to sign up stemming from the military contracts not being easily broken by law despite advertisements often promising only one year of service. Moscow Times also said that another sign of the recruitment struggle was an intensified campaign to pressure university students to sign contracts, with students being encouraged to join drone forces, and some students who failed their winter exams being offered contracts as an ″alternative to expulsion″. The Defense Ministry also appears to have set up recruitment quotas for universities in order to recruit as many students as possible.

According to human rights activist Sergei Krivenko, other groups of people targeted in similar recruitment campaigns have included migrants, people in difficult financial situations, and homeless people. Krivenko said that in June 2026, military enlistment officers and security forces detained local men during coordinated street raids in Penza Oblast, adding that such cases are difficult to measure across the nation, but indicate that recruitment efforts have become more aggressive.

In August 2026, The Wall Street Journal said that more fighting-age men were being ″strong-armed″ into military service amidst stalling voluntary recruitment, with some recruiters resorting to detaining men on the street, outside their workplace, or under the pretext of document checks according to lawyers, rights activists and eyewitnesses. Once taken to a recruitment office, they may be threatened or beaten until they sign a contract. The same month, the Poland based outlet Vot Tak released an investigation indicating that Russia was recruiting more women for the war due to the shrinking number of potential male recruits, with the women being used for a wider range of combat duties as opposed to civilian and support roles that have been more traditional in the Russian military. By this time, western officials estimated that Russia was losing about 6,000 more soldiers than it was recruiting monthly.

In October 2026, The Economist reported an exodus of thousands of Russian men as they feared a new mobilization following elections in Russia.

In November 2026, Russian police carried out mass detentions near the Kitay-gorod metro station in central Moscow, with some detainees saying they were issued draft notices and pressured to sign military contracts.
